= Culture of Israel =

The culture of Israel is closely associated with Jewish culture and rooted in the Jewish history of the diaspora and Zionist movement. It has also been influenced by Arab culture and the history and traditions of the Arab Israeli population and other ethnic minorities that live in Israel, among them Druze, Circassians, Armenians and others.

Tel Aviv and Jerusalem are considered the main cultural hubs of Israel. The New York Times has described Tel Aviv as the "capital of Mediterranean cool", Lonely Planet ranked it as a top ten city for nightlife, and National Geographic named it one of the top ten beach cities. Similarly, Jerusalem has earned international acclaim; Time magazine included it in its list of the "World’s Greatest Places", and Travel+Leisure ranked it as the third favorite city in the Middle East and Africa among its readers.

Israel's museums, numbering over 200, draw millions of visitors annually. Israeli art's development, heavily influenced by 20th century European trends was heavily centered in Tel Aviv and Jerusalem. Major art museums operate in Tel Aviv, Jerusalem, Haifa and Herzliya, as well as in many towns and Kibbutzim. The Israel Philharmonic Orchestra plays at venues throughout the country and abroad, and almost every city has its own orchestra, many of the musicians hailing from the former Soviet Union. Folk dancing is popular in Israel, and Israeli modern dance companies, among them the Batsheva Dance Company, are highly acclaimed in the dance world. The Habima Theatre, which is considered the national theatre of Israel, was established in 1917. Israeli filmmakers and actors have won awards at international film festivals in recent years. Since the 1980s, Israeli literature has been widely translated, and several Israeli writers have achieved international recognition.

There has been minimal cultural exchange between Israel’s Jewish and Arab populations. Jews from Arab-Muslim Middle East communities brought with them elements from the majority cultures in which they lived. The mixing of Ashkenazi, Sephardi, and Middle Eastern traditions have advanced modern Israeli culture, along with traditions brought by Russian, former Soviet republican, Central European and American immigrants. The Hebrew language revival has also developed Israel’s modern culture. Israel’s culture is based on its cultural diversity, shared language, and common religious and historical Jewish tradition.

== History ==
With a diverse population of immigrants from five continents and more than 100 countries, and significant subcultures like the Mizrahim, Arabs, Russian Jews, Ethiopian Jews, Secular Jews and the Ultra Orthodox, each with its own cultural networks, Israeli culture is extremely varied. It follows cultural trends, and changes across the globe, as well as expressing a unique spirit of its own. In addition, Israel is a family-oriented society with a strong sense of community.

=== Influences and impact ===
==== Ancient Near East civilizations ====
Ancient Israel, as a civilization of the ancient Near East, was influenced to some degree by other regional cultures. The Paleo-Hebrew alphabet was adapted from the Phoenician alphabet and the square script is a derivative of the Aramaic alphabet. Zoroastrianism of Ancient Iran is believed to have had an influence on Jewish eschatology. Jewish mythology contains similarities to Mesopotamian mythologies, such as the Enūma Eliš of Babylon, the Genesis creation narrative, the Epic of Gilgamesh, and the Genesis flood narrative.

==== Judaism, Christianity and Western civilization ====
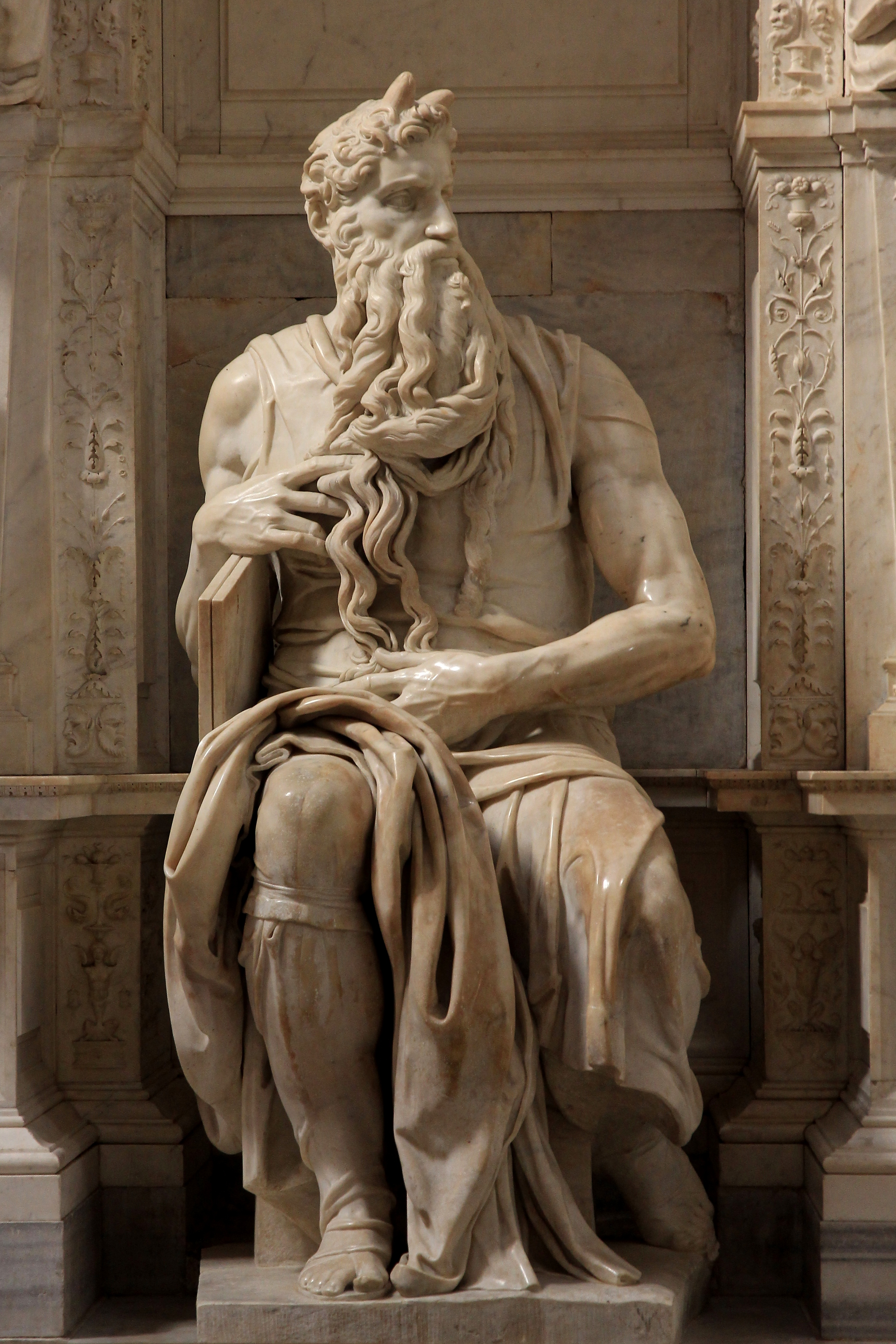
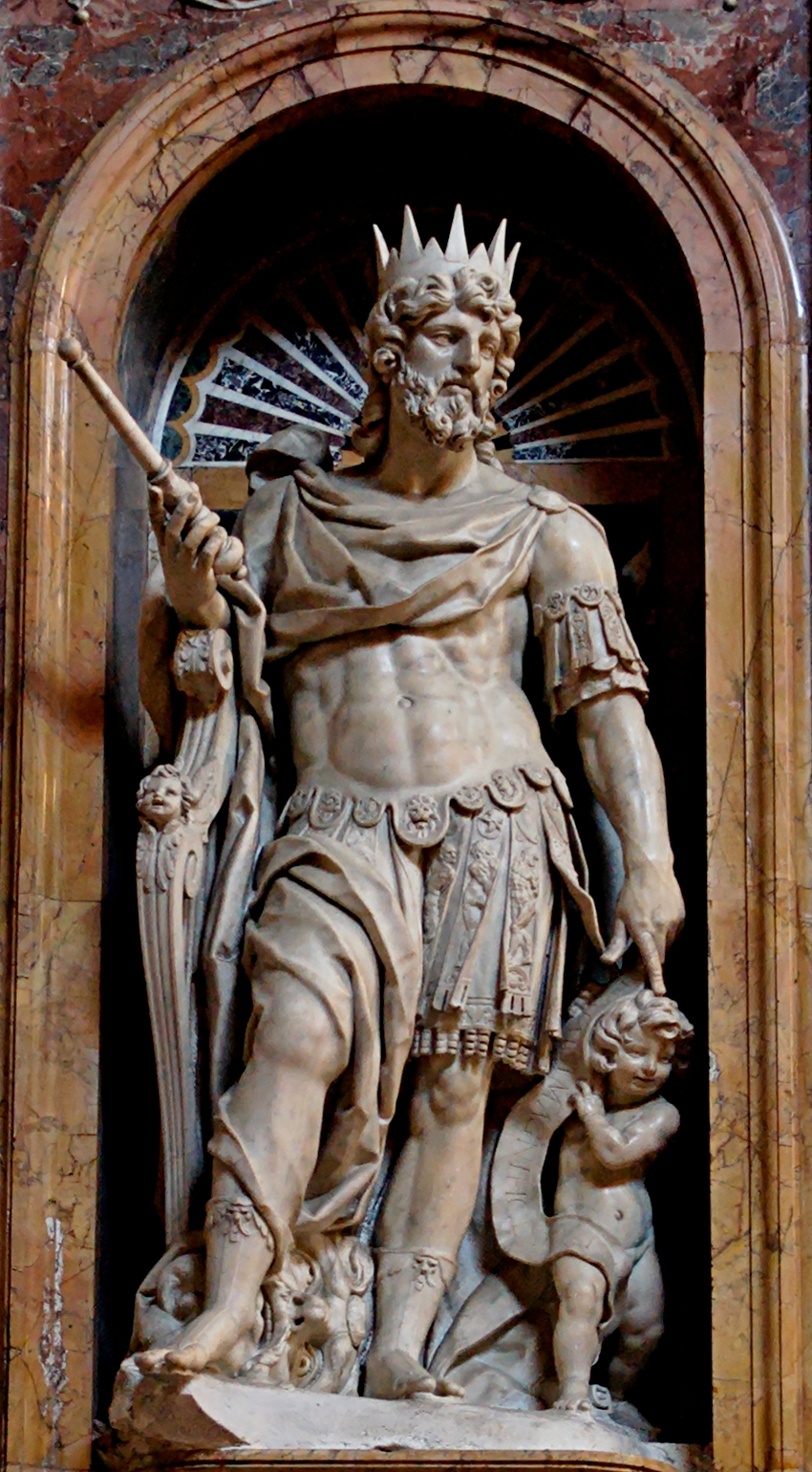
The statues of Moses by Michelangelo (left) and David by Nicolas Cordier are examples of Western art, influenced by the Hebrew Bible. The Bible is one of the cornerstones of Western culture.

Judaism, which originated in Ancient Israel, represents the foundation of much of Western civilization's traits, thanks to its relation to Christianity. It impacted the West in a multitude of ways, from its ethics, to its practices to monotheism; all of its benefits largely impacted the world through Christianity. The Hebrew Bible, authored by Jews in the Land of Israel from the 8th to the 2nd century BCE, is a cornerstone of Western civilization. Around 63 BCE, Judea became part of the Roman Empire; around 6 BCE, Jesus was born to a Jewish family in the town of Nazareth, and decades later, was crucified under Pontius Pilate. His followers later believed that he was resurrected, inspiring them to spread the new Christian religion throughout the world. Christianity took hold in the Hellenistic Greco-Roman world, which eventually grew into the entirety of Europe, thanks to Roman expansion. These nations later became the very foundation of today's 'Western world'.

Christianity, the religion of the West and essential religion of the Western World, grew from Judaism, and began as a Second Temple Judaic sect in the mid-1st century. The New Testament, authored by first-century Jews, is one of the bedrock texts of Western civilization as well.

==== Islamic civilization ====
Islam was strongly influenced by Judaism in its fundamental religious outlook, structure, jurisprudence and practice. Islam derives its ideas of holy text, the Qur'an, ultimately from Judaism, and contains references to more than fifty people and events also found in the Bible including the creation narrative, Adam and Eve, Cain and Abel, the Genesis flood narrative, Abraham, Sodom and Gomorrah, Moses and the Exodus, King David and the Jewish prophets. The New Testament, authored by Jews in Roman Judea, also influenced Islam. Additionally, the Qur'an mentions figures such as Jesus, Mary and John the Baptist. The dietary and legal codes of Islam, the basic design of the mosque, and the communal prayer services of Islam, including their devotional routines, are derived from Judaism.

=== 'Melting pot' approach ===
Cultural map of the world according to the World Values Survey, describing Israel as a whole at parity in "Rational-Secular Values" and also at parity in "Self-expression values".

With the waves of Jewish aliyah in the 19th and 20th centuries, the existing culture was supplemented by the culture and traditions of the immigrant population. Zionism links the Jewish people to the Land of Israel, the homeland of the Jews between around 1200 BCE and 70 CE (end of the Second Temple era). However, modern Zionism evolved both politically and religiously. Though Zionist groups were first competing with other Jewish political movements, Zionism became an equivalent to political Judaism during and after The Holocaust.

The first Israeli prime minister, David Ben-Gurion, led a trend to blend the many immigrants who, in the first years of the state, had arrived from Europe, North Africa, and Asia, into one 'melting pot' that would not differentiate between the older residents of the country, and the new immigrants. The original purpose was to unify the newer immigrants with the veteran Israelis, for the creation of a common Hebrew culture, and to build a new nation in the country.

Two central tools employed for this purpose were the Israel Defense Forces, and the education system. The Israel Defense Forces, by means of its transformation to a national army, would constitute a common ground among all civilians of the country, wherever they are. The education system, having been unified under Israeli law, enabled different students from different sectors to study together at the same schools. Gradually, Israeli society became more pluralistic, and the 'melting pot' declined over the years.

Some critics of the 'melting pot' consider it to have been a necessity in the first years of the state, in order to build a mutual society, but now claim that there is no longer a need for it. They instead see a need for Israeli society to enable people to express the differences, and the exclusivity, of every stream and sector. Others, mainly Mizrahi Jews who are more Shomer Masoret and the Holocaust survivors, have criticized the early 'melting pot' process. According to them, they were forced to give up or conceal their Jewish Masoret, and their diaspora heritage and culture, which they brought from their diaspora countries, and to adopt the new secular "Sabra" culture.

Today, cultural diversity is celebrated; many speak several languages, continue to eat the food of their cultural origins, and have mixed outlooks.

== Language ==
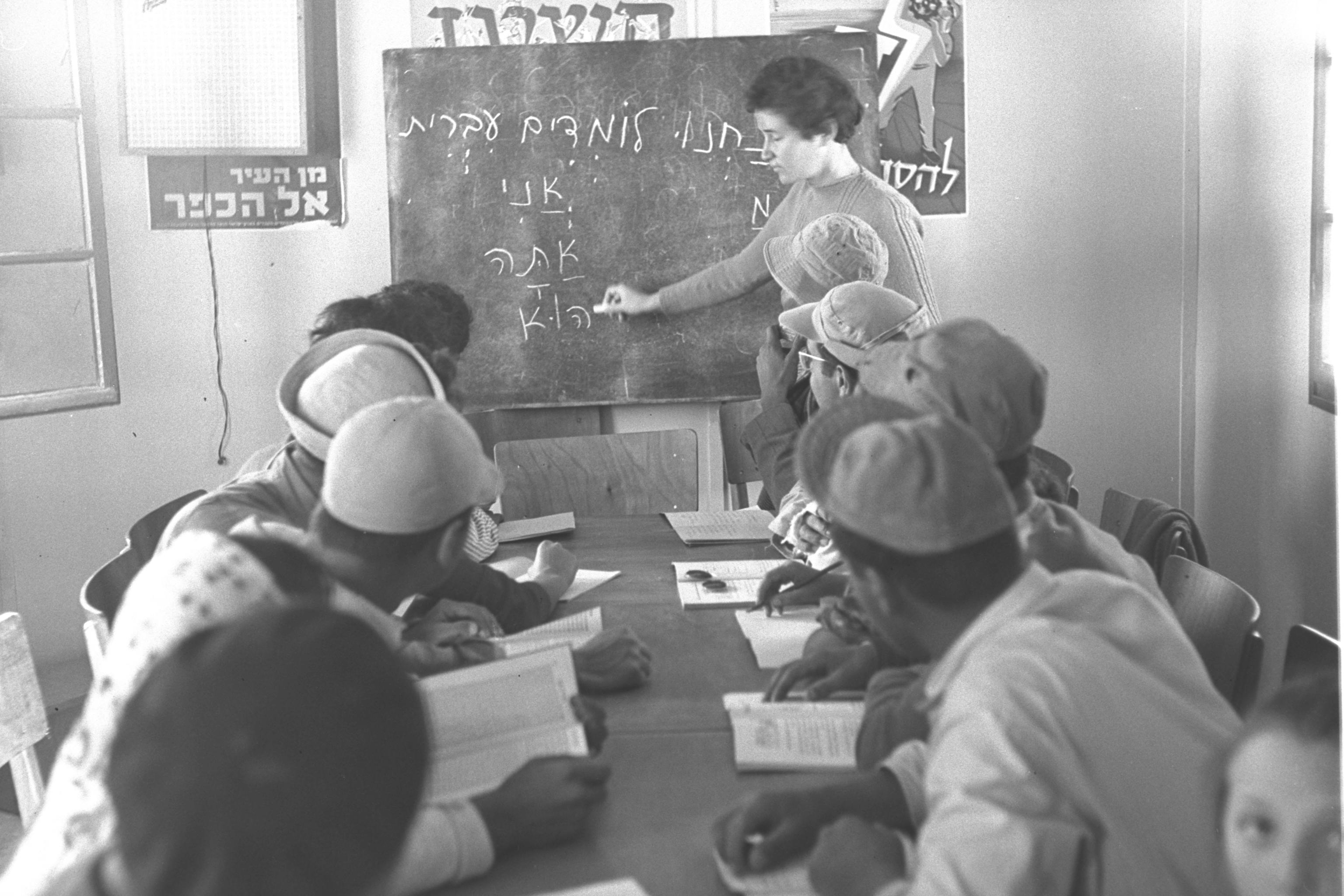
Hebrew ulpan in Dimona, 1955

While Hebrew is the official language of the State of Israel, over 83 languages are spoken in the country.

As new immigrants arrived, Hebrew language instruction was important. Eliezer Ben-Yehuda, who founded the Hebrew Language Committee, coined thousands of new words and concepts based on Biblical, Talmudic and other sources, to cope with the needs and demands of life in the 20th century. Learning Hebrew became a national goal, employing the slogan "Yehudi, daber Ivrit" ("Jew—speak Hebrew"). Special schools for Hebrew language learning, ulpanim, were set up all over the country.

The Hebraizing of family names was common in the pre-state period, and became more widespread in the 1950s. In the early years of the state, a pamphlet was published on how to choose a Hebrew name. The prime minister, David Ben-Gurion, urged anyone who represented the state in a formal capacity to adopt a Hebrew surname.

== Education ==
In 2012, Israel was named the second most educated country in the world, according to the Organization for Economic Cooperation and Development (OECD)'s Education at a Glance report, released in 2012. The report found that 78% of the money invested in education is from public funds, and 45% of the population has a university or college diploma.

== Philosophy ==
=== Ancient Israel ===
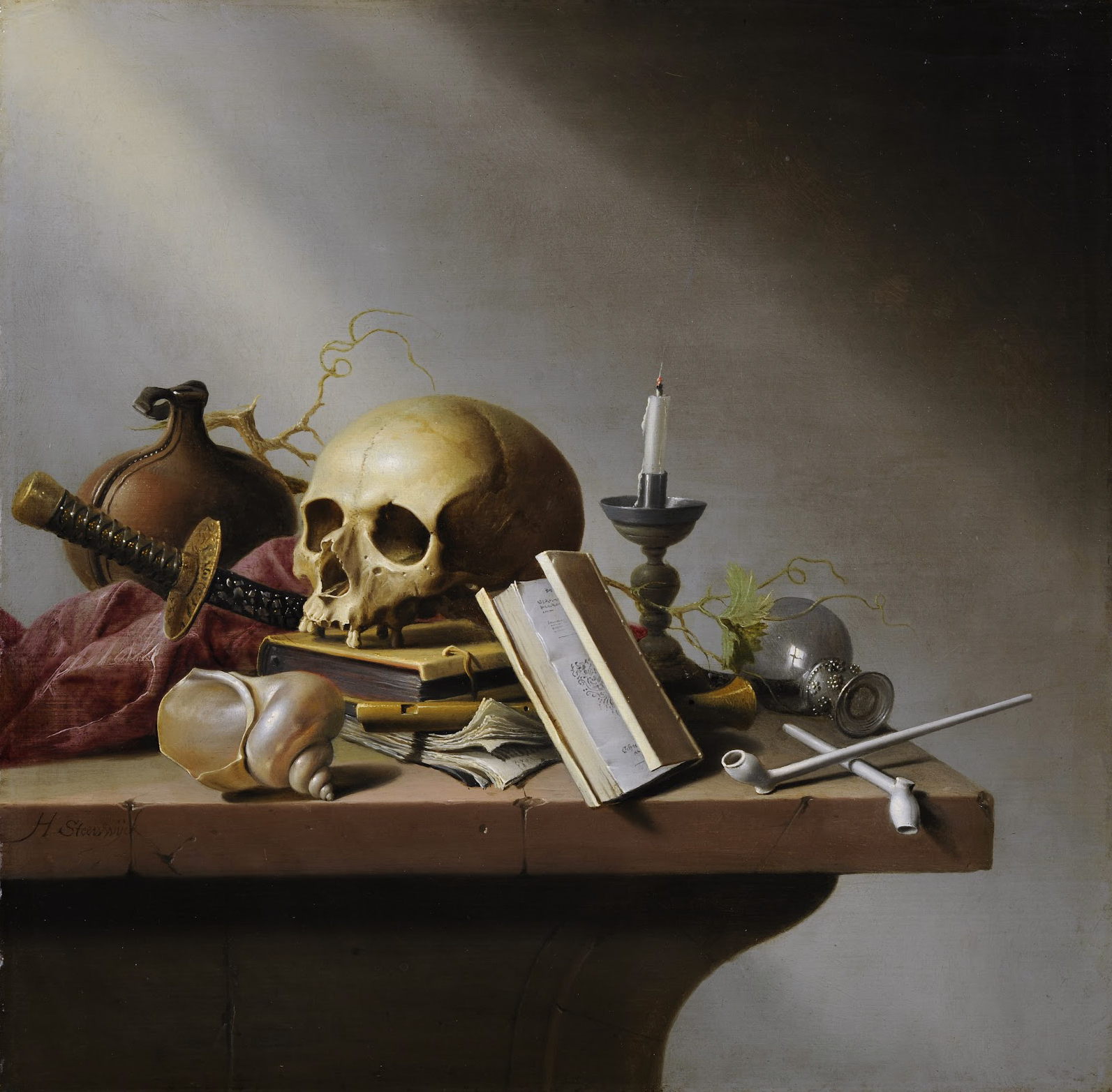
Ecclesiastes is known for its incipit vanity of vanities; all is vanity and concepts of Vanitas

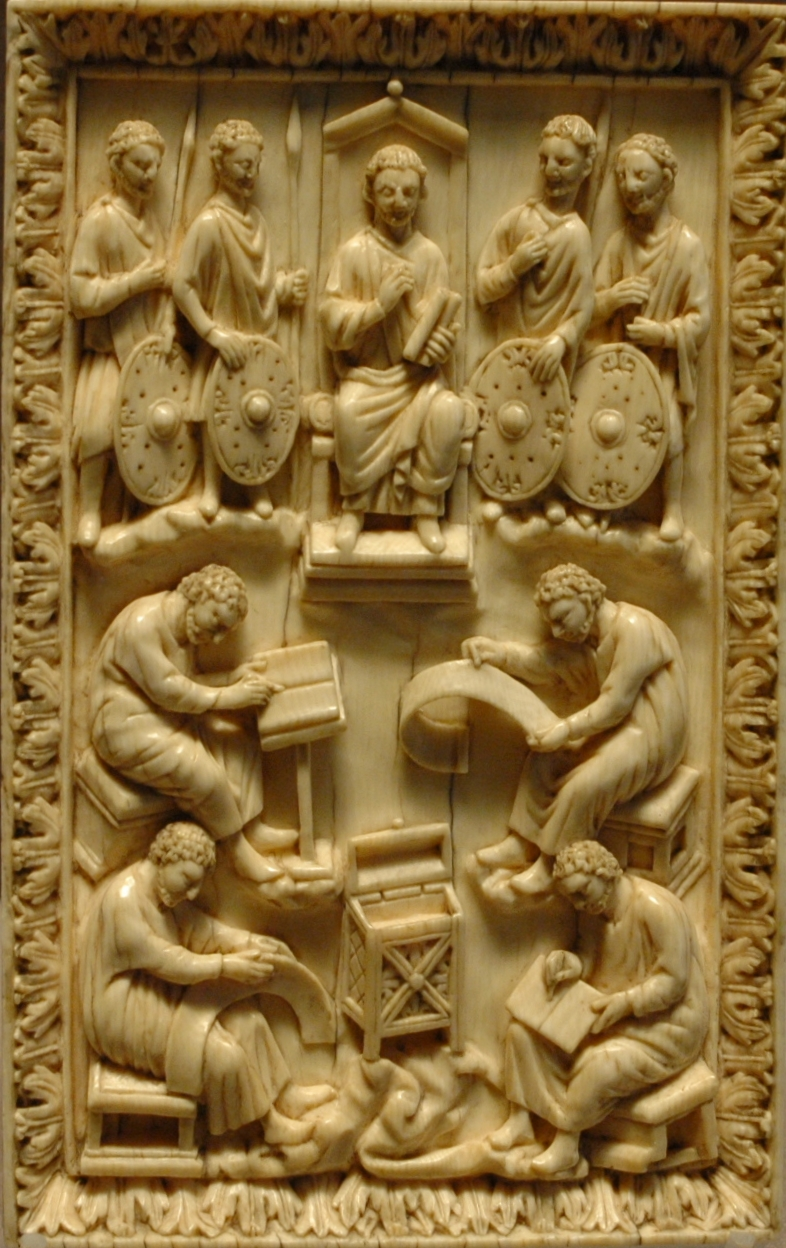
David dictating the Psalms. The practice of psalms is referred to as a philosophical and theological problem

Ancient Israeli philosophical ideas and approach can be found in the Bible. Psalms contains invitations to admire the wisdom of God through his works; from this, some scholars suggest, Judaism harbors a Philosophical under-current. The exegetical work of Psalm 132 stands as language-based philosophy as both a subject and method.

Ecclesiastes is often considered to be the only genuine philosophical work in the Hebrew Bible; its author seeks to understand the place of human beings in the world, and life's meaning. Ecclesiastes and the Book of Job were favorite works of medieval philosophers, who took them as philosophical discussions not dependent on historical revelation. Ecclesiastes has had a deep influence on Western literature. It contains several phrases that have resonated in British and American culture, such as "eat, drink and be merry," "nothing new under the sun," "a time to be born and a time to die," and "vanity of vanities; all is vanity."

In other books such as Proverbs or Sirach and Book of Wisdom of the Jewish apocrypha, there are references and praise to the concept of wisdom, which was to have a primordial significance for Jewish thought.

=== Roman Judea ===
Philosophical speculation was not a central part of Rabbinic Judaism, although some have seen the Mishnah as a philosophical work. Rabbi Akiva has also been viewed as a philosophical figure: his statements include 1.) "How favored is man, for he was created after an image "for in an image, Elohim made man" (Gen. ix. 6); 2.) "Everything is foreseen; but freedom [of will] is given to every man"; 3.) "The world is governed by mercy... but the divine decision is made by the preponderance of the good or bad in one's actions". Like Philo, who saw in the Hebrew construction of the infinitive with the finite form of the same verb and in certain particles (adverbs, prepositions, etc.) some deep reference to philosophical and ethical doctrines, Akiva perceived in them indications of many important ceremonial laws, legal statutes, and ethical teachings.

A tannaitic tradition mentions that of the four who entered paradise, Akiva was the only one that returned unscathed. This serves at least to show how strong in later ages was the recollection of Akiva's philosophical speculation Akiva's anthropology is based upon the principle that man was created בצלם, that is, not in the image of God—which would be בצלם אלהים—but after an image, after a primordial type; or, philosophically speaking, after an Idea—what Philo calls in agreement with Judean theology, "the first heavenly man" (see Adam ḳadmon).

=== Modern Israel ===
Modern Israeli philosophy has been influenced by both secular and religious Jewish thought.

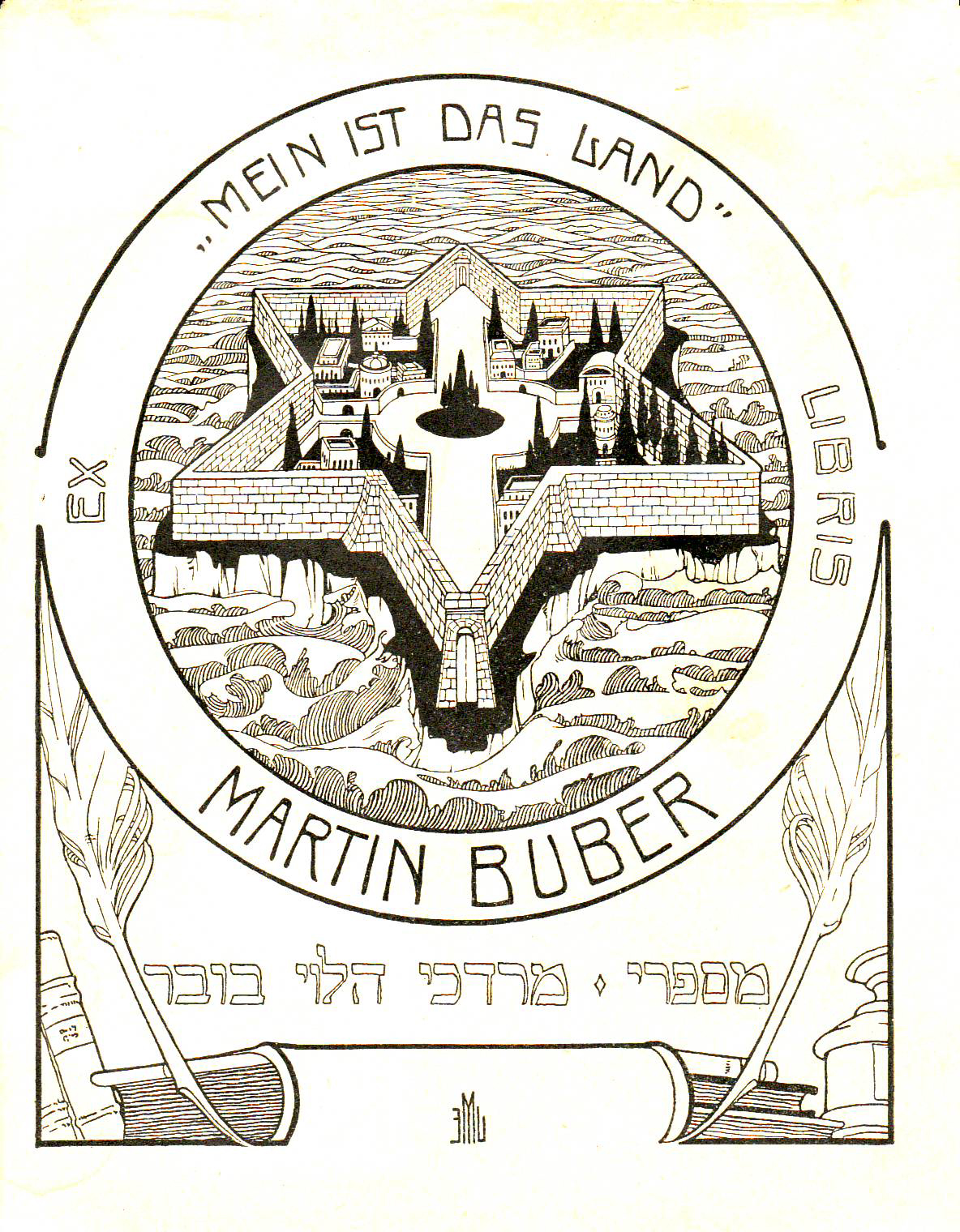
A Bookplate done for Martin Buber; The plate is adorned with the walls of Jerusalem in the shape of a Shield of David, viewed from above

Martin Buber best known for his philosophy of dialogue, a form of existentialism centered on the distinction between the I–Thou relationship and the I–It relationship. In I and Thou, Buber introduced his thesis on human existence; Ich‑Du is a relationship that stresses the mutual, holistic existence of two beings. It is a concrete encounter, because these beings meet one another in their authentic existence, without any qualification or objectification of one another. Even imagination and ideas do not play a role in this relation. In an I–Thou encounter, infinity and universality are made actual (rather than being merely concepts). The Ich-Es ("I‑It") relationship is nearly the opposite of Ich‑Du. Whereas in Ich‑Du the two beings encounter one another, in an Ich‑Es relationship the beings do not actually meet. Instead, the "I" confronts and qualifies an idea, or conceptualization, of the being in its presence and treats that being as an object. All such objects are considered merely mental representations, created and sustained by the individual mind.

Yeshayahu Leibowitz was an Orthodox Jew who held controversial views on the subject of halakha, or Jewish rabbinical law. He wrote that the sole purpose of religious commandments was to obey God, and not to receive any kind of reward in this world, or the world to come. He maintained that the reasons for religious commandments were beyond man's understanding, as well as irrelevant, and any attempt to attribute emotional significance to the performance of mitzvot was misguided, and akin to idolatry. The essence of Leibowitz's religious outlook is that a person's faith is his commitment to obey God, meaning God's commandments, and this has nothing to do with a person's image of God. This is a possibility, because Leibowitz thought that God cannot be described, that God's understanding is not man's understanding, and thus all the questions asked of God are out of place. One result of this approach is that faith, which is a personal commitment to obey God, cannot be challenged by the usual philosophical problem of evil, or by historical events that seemingly contradict a divine presence. If a person stops believing after an awful event, it shows that he only obeyed God because he thought he understood God's plan, or because he expected to see a reward. But “for Leibowitz, religious belief is not an explanation of life, nature or history, or a promise of a future in this world or another, but a demand.”

Joseph Raz is a legal, moral, and political philosopher. Raz's first book, The Concept of a Legal System, was based on his doctoral thesis. A later book, The Morality of Freedom, develops a conception of perfectionist liberalism. Raz has argued for a distinctive understanding of legal commands as exclusionary reasons for action and for the "service conception" of authority, according to which those subject to an authority, "can benefit by its decisions only if they can establish their existence and content in ways which do not depend on raising the very same issues which the authority is there to settle." This, in turn, supports Raz's argument for legal positivism, in particular "the sources thesis," "the idea that an adequate test for the existence and content of law must be based only on social facts, and not on moral arguments.". Raz is acknowledged by his contemporaries as being one of the most important living legal philosophers. He has authored and edited eleven books to date, namely The Concept of a Legal System, Practical Reason and Norms, The Authority of Law, The Morality of Freedom, Authority, Ethics in the Public Domain, Engaging Reason, Value, Respect and Attachment, The Practice of Value, Between Authority and Interpretation, and From Normativity to Responsibility. In moral theory, Raz defends value pluralism and the idea that various values are incommensurable.

Other notable Israeli philosophers include Avishai Margalit, Hugo Bergmann, Yehoshua Bar-Hillel, Pinchas Lapide, Israel Eldad and Judea Pearl.

Hillel the Elder (c. 110 BCE – 10 CE)	Akiva ben Joseph (c. 50–135)	A. D. Gordon (1856–1922)	Martin Buber (1878–1965)	Hugo Bergmann (1883–1975)	Yeshayahu Leibowitz (1903–1994)	Joseph Raz (1939–2022)

== Literature and poetry ==
=== Ancient Israel ===
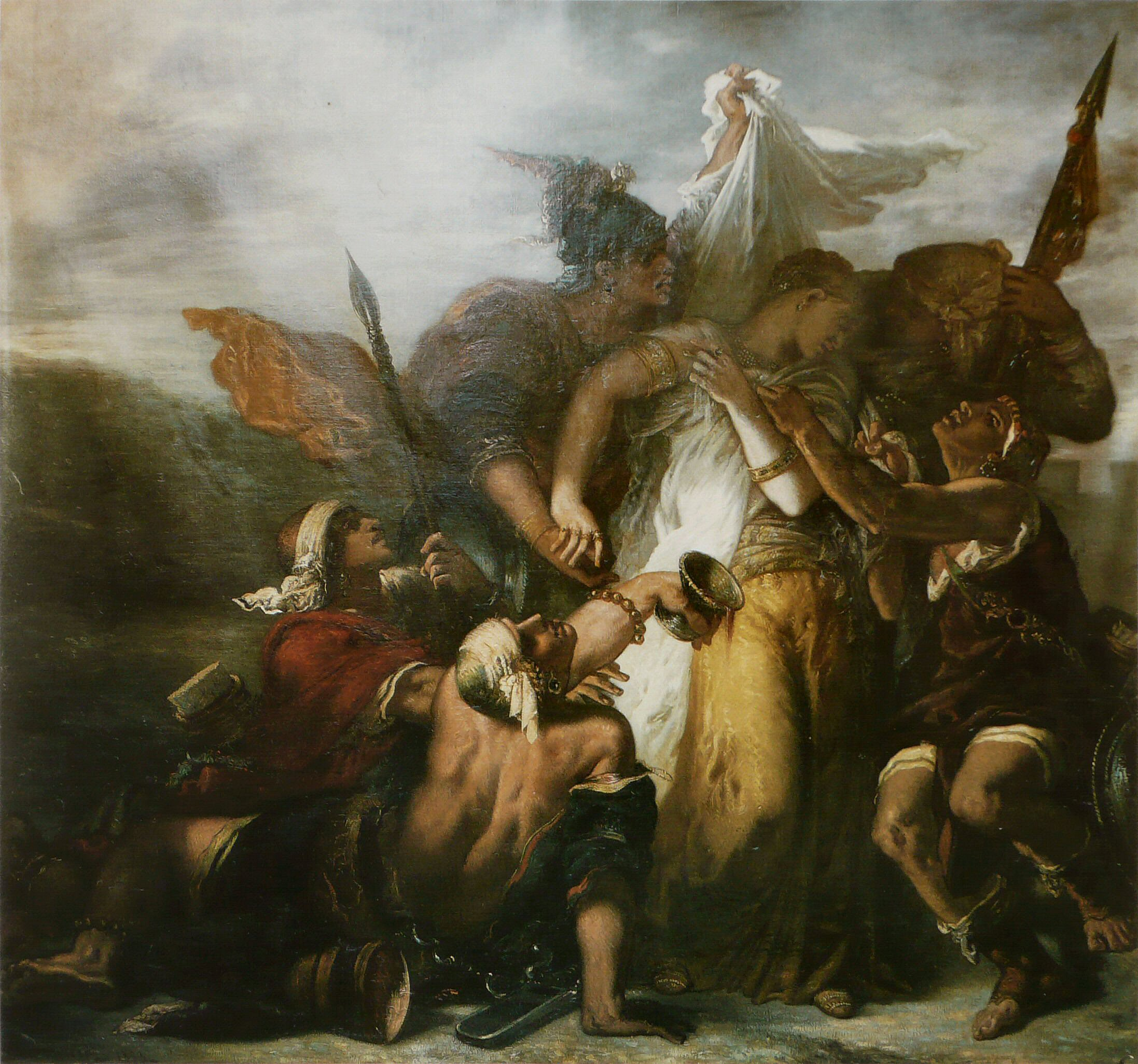
Illustration for the Song of Songs. Along with the Book of Esther, the ancient poem is an example of an ancient Israeli literature with no mention of God, and is traditionally read as an allegory of the relationship between God and Israel

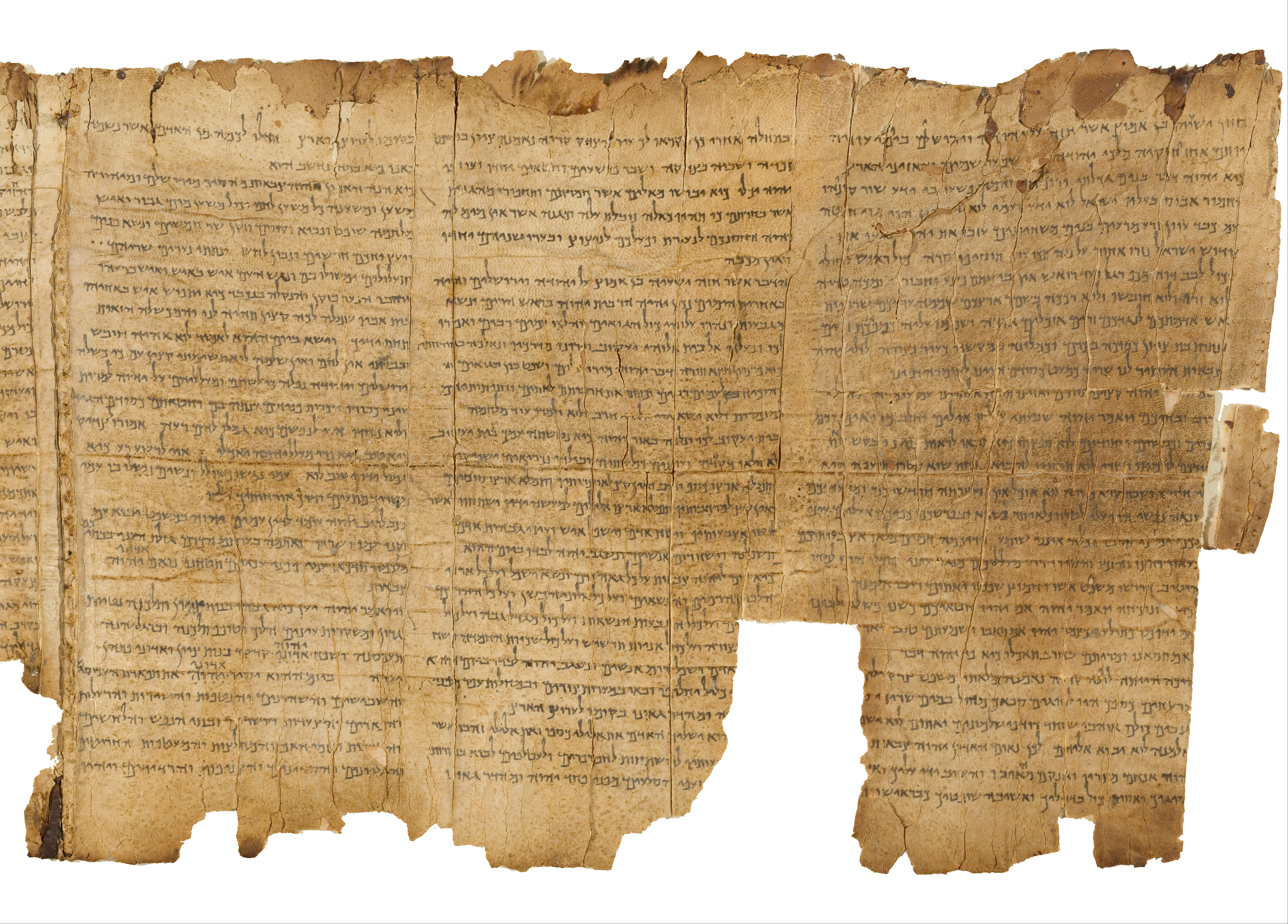
A portion of the Isaiah Scroll. One of the earliest known manuscripts of biblical literature

The earliest known inscription in Hebrew is the Khirbet Qeiyafa Inscription (11th — 10th century BCE), if it can indeed be considered Hebrew at that early a stage. This inscription is by far the most varied, extensive, and historically significant body of literature written in the old Classical Hebrew, and is the canon of the Hebrew Bible. The Bible is not a single, monolithic piece of literature, because each of these three sections, in turn, contains books written at different times by different authors, written from the 8th to the 2nd century BCE. It is the primary source of ancient Israelite mythology, literature, philosophy and poetry. All books of the Bible are not strictly religious in nature; for example, The Song of Songs is a love poem, and, along with The Book of Esther, does not explicitly mention God.

The Ketuvim sector of the Hebrew Bible is a collection of philosophical and artistic literature believed to have been written under the influence of Ruach ha-Kodesh (the Holy Spirit). The Book of Job, for instance, addressing the problem of theodicy – the vindication of the justice of God in the light of humanity's suffering – it is a rich theological work setting out a variety of perspectives. It has been widely and often extravagantly praised for its literary qualities, with Alfred, Lord Tennyson calling it "the greatest poem of ancient and modern times".

Some content reflects historical events in ancient Israel such as the Kingdoms of Israel and Judah, the siege of Jerusalem, the Babylonian captivity and the Maccabean Revolt.

The Dead Sea Scrolls are thousands of Jewish, predominantly Hebrew manuscripts, dated from the last three centuries BCE and from the first century CE. The texts have great historical, religious, and linguistic significance, because they include the second-oldest known surviving manuscripts of works later included in the Hebrew Bible canon, along with deuterocanonical and extra-biblical manuscripts, which preserve evidence of the diversity of religious and philosophical thought in late Second Temple Judaism. Archaeologists have long associated the scrolls with the ancient Jewish sect called the Essenes, although some recent interpretations have challenged this connection, and argue that priests in Jerusalem, or Zadokites, or other unknown Jewish groups wrote the scrolls.

=== Roman Judea ===
Post-Biblical Hebrew writings include early rabbinic works of Midrash and Mishnah. The Mishnah is the first major written redaction of the Jewish oral traditions known as the "Oral Torah". It is also the first major work of Rabbinic literature, written in religious centers such as Yavneh, Lod and Bnei Brak, under the Roman occupation of Judea. It contains the oral traditions of the Pharisees from the Second Temple period particularly the period of the Tannaim. Most of the Mishnah is written in Mishnaic Hebrew, while some parts are in Jewish Aramaic.

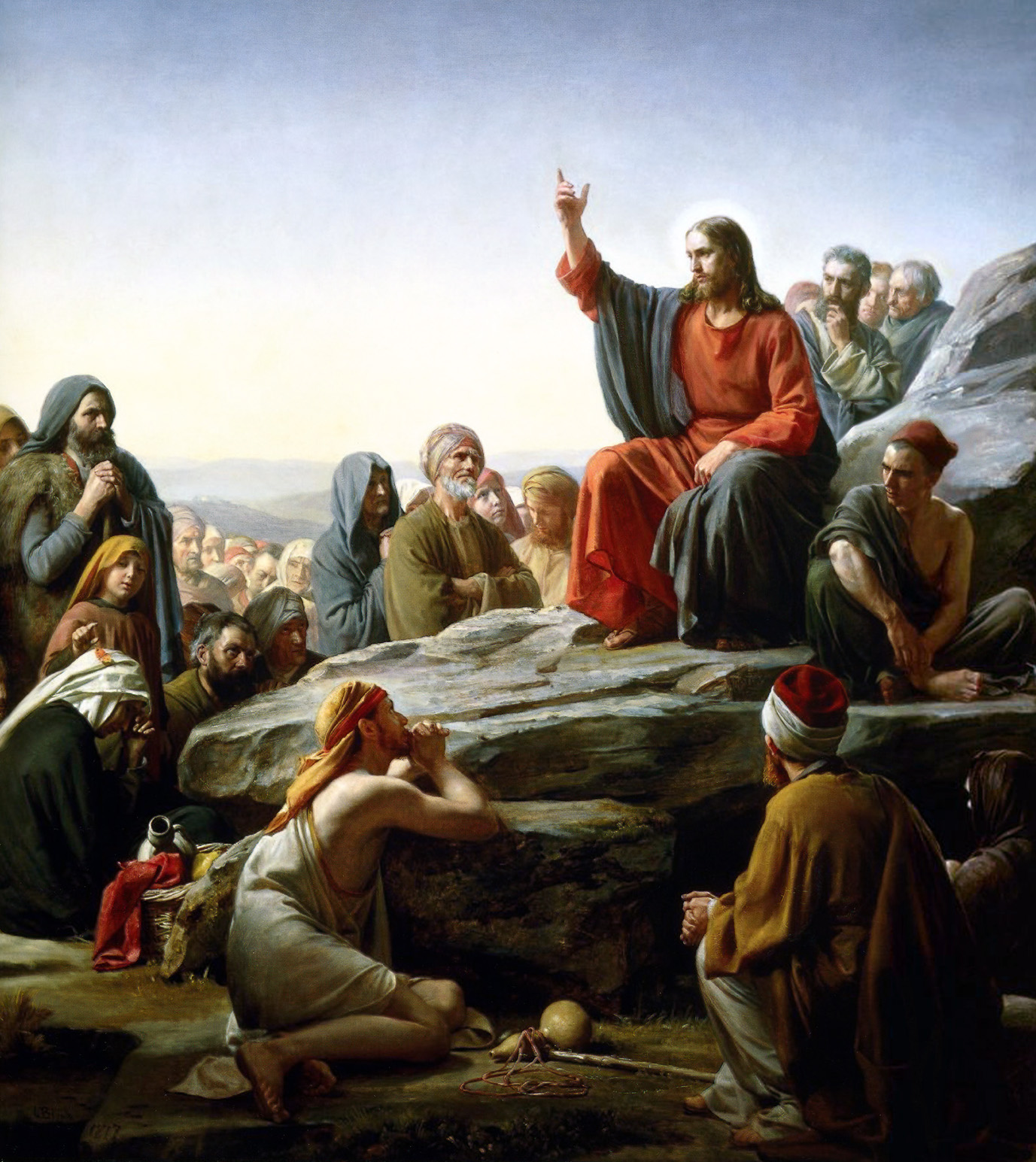
Sermon on the Mount. The New Testament was authored by Christian Jews during Roman-ruled Judea

The Jewish-Christian movement was formed in Judea of the early first-century. The books of the New Testament were all or nearly all written by Jewish Christians—that is, Jewish disciples of Jesus, during the first and early second centuries Luke, who wrote the Gospel of Luke and the Book of Acts, is frequently thought of as an exception; scholars are divided as to whether Luke was a Gentile or a Hellenistic Jew. The Gospels were written between 68 and 110 CE, Acts between 95 and 110, Epistles between 51 and 110 CE and Revelation in c. 95 CE.

Josephus was a scholar, historian and hagiographer who was born in 37 CE in Jerusalem, Judea. He recorded Jewish history, with special emphasis on the first century CE and the First Jewish–Roman War, including the Siege of Masada. His most important works were The Jewish War (c. 75), Antiquities of the Jews (c. 94) and Against Apion. The Jewish War recounts the Jewish revolt against Roman occupation (66–70). Antiquities of the Jews recounts the history of the world from a Jewish perspective for an ostensibly Roman audience. These works provide valuable insight into first century Judaism and the background of Early Christianity.

=== Old Yishuv ===
Following the expulsion from Spain and Portugal many Jews settled in the Ottoman Empire including Palestine, contributing greatly to the culture of the Jewish community, especially in literature, poetry, philosophy and mysticism. The city of Safed was a center of a widespread spiritual and mystical activity. Joseph Karo, an author and kabbalist, settled in Safed in 1563. In safed he authored Shulchan Aruch, the most widely consulted of the various legal codes in Judaism. Shlomo Halevi Alkabetz, a kabbalist and poet, settled in 1535 where he composed the Jewish poem Lecha Dodi. Isaac Luria (1534-1572), born in Jerusalem, was a foremost rabbi and Jewish mystic in the community of Safed. He is considered the father of contemporary Kabbalah, his teachings being referred to as Lurianic Kabbalah. The works of his disciples compiled his oral teachings into writing. Every custom of his was scrutinized, and many were accepted, even against previous practice.

Around 1550, Moses ben Jacob Cordovero founded a Kabbalah academy in Safed. Among his disciples were many of the luminaries of Safed, including Rabbi Eliyahu de Vidas, author of Reshit Chochmah ("Beginning of Wisdom"), and Rabbi Chaim Vital, who later became the official recorder and disseminator of the teachings of Rabbi Isaac Luria. Other kabbalists in the Land of Israel at that time were Isaiah Horowitz, Moshe Chaim Luzzatto, Abraham Azulai, Chaim ibn Attar, Shalom Sharabi, Chaim Yosef David Azulai and Abraham Gershon of Kitov.

=== Modern Israel ===
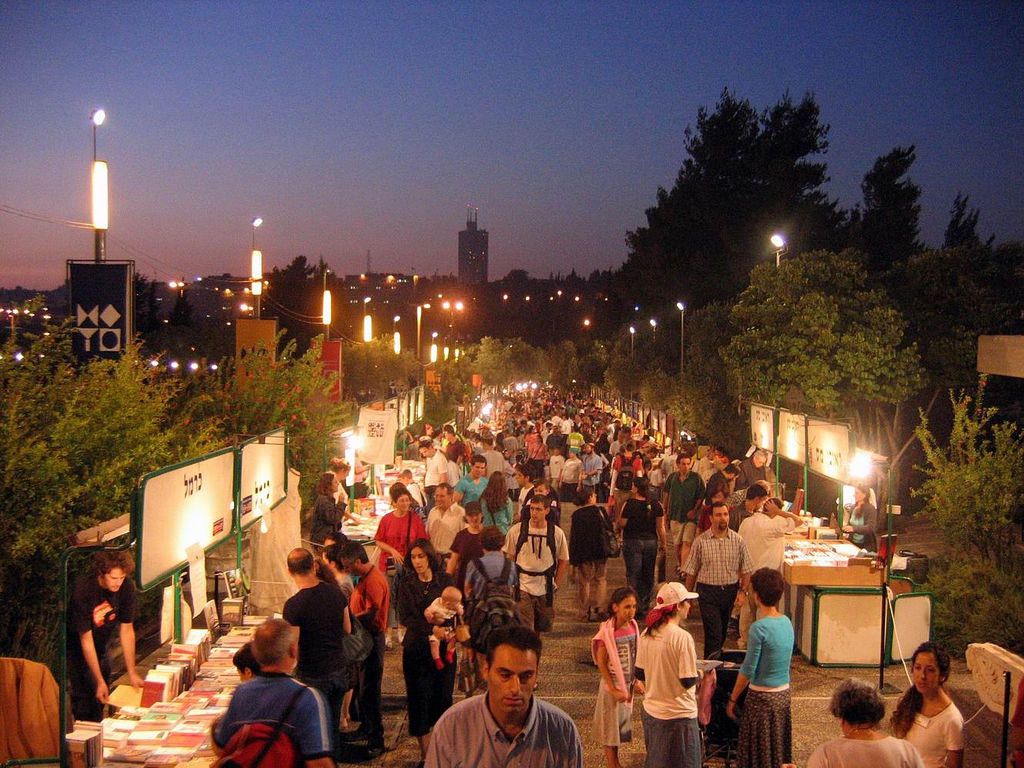
Hebrew Book Week 2005, Israel Museum, Jerusalem

The first works of Hebrew literature in Israel were written by immigrant authors rooted in the world and traditions of European Jewry. Yosef Haim Brenner (1881–1921) and Shmuel Yosef Agnon (1888–1970), are considered by many to be the fathers of modern Hebrew literature. Brenner, torn between hope and despair, struggled with the reality of the Zionist enterprise in the Land of Israel. Agnon, Brenner's contemporary, fused his knowledge of Jewish heritage with the influence of 19th and early 20th century European literature. He produced fiction dealing with the disintegration of traditional ways of life, loss of faith, and the subsequent loss of identity. In 1966, Agnon was co-recipient of the Nobel Prize for Literature.

Native-born writers who published their work in the 1940s and 1950s, often called the "War of Independence generation," brought a sabra mentality and culture to their writing. S. Yizhar, Moshe Shamir, Hanoch Bartov and Benjamin Tammuz vacillated between individualism and commitment to society and state. In the early 1960s, A.B. Yehoshua, Amos Oz, and Yaakov Shabtai broke away from ideologies to focus on the world of the individual, experimenting with narrative forms and writing styles such as psychological realism, allegory, and symbolism.

Since the 1980s and early 1990s, Israeli literature has been widely translated, and several Israeli writers have achieved international recognition.

Josephus (37 – c. 100)	Joseph Karo (1488–1575)	Hayim Nahman Bialik (1873–1934)	Shaul Tchernichovsky (1875–1943)	Shmuel Yosef Agnon (1888–1970)	Rachel Bluwstein (1890–1931)	Leah Goldberg (1911–1970)	Amos Oz (1939–2018)

== Science and technology ==
=== Ancient Israel ===
The early activity in science in ancient Israel can be found in the Hebrew Bible, where some of the books contain descriptions of the physical world. Biblical cosmology provides sporadic glimpses that may be stitched together to form a Biblical impression of the physical universe. There have been comparisons between the Bible, with passages such as from the Genesis creation narrative, and the astronomy of classical antiquity more generally. The Old Testament also contains various cleansing rituals. One suggested ritual, for example, deals with the proper procedure for cleansing a leper (Leviticus 14:1–32). It is a fairly elaborate process, which is to be performed after a leper was already healed of leprosy (Leviticus 14:3), involving spiritual purity (the concepts of tumah and taharah), extensive physical cleansing, and personal hygiene, but also includes sacrificing a bird and lambs, with the addition of using their blood to symbolize that the afflicted has been cleansed. As with other purification ceremonies described in the Torah, cedar wood and the hyssop herb are also burnt during the ritual.

The Torah proscribes Intercropping (Lev. 19:19, Deut 22:9), a practice often associated with sustainable agriculture and organic farming in modern agricultural science. The Mosaic code has provisions concerning the conservation of natural resources, such as trees (Deuteronomy 20:19–20) and birds (Deuteronomy 22:6–7).

=== Modern Israel ===
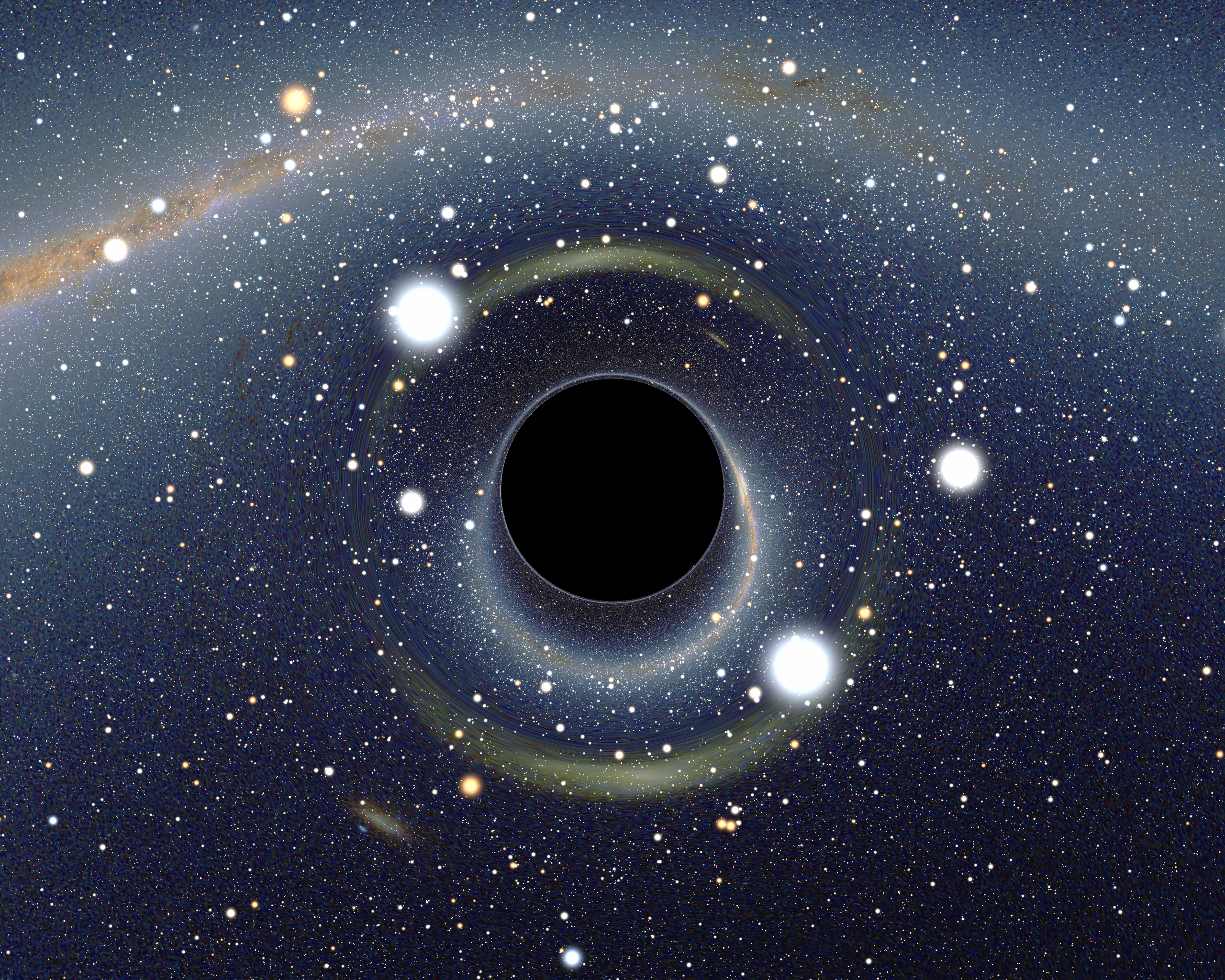
Simulated view of a black hole. Jacob Bekenstein predicted and co-discovered black hole entropy

Israel is a developed and highly advanced country and ranks fifth among the most innovative countries in the Bloomberg Innovation Index. Israel counts 140 scientists and technicians per 10,000 employees, one of the highest ratios in the world, and 8,337 full-time equivalent researchers per million inhabitants. It also has one of the highest per capita rates of filed patents. Israel's high technology industry has benefited from both the country's highly educated and technologically skilled workforce coupled with the strong presence of foreign high-tech firms and sophisticated research centres.

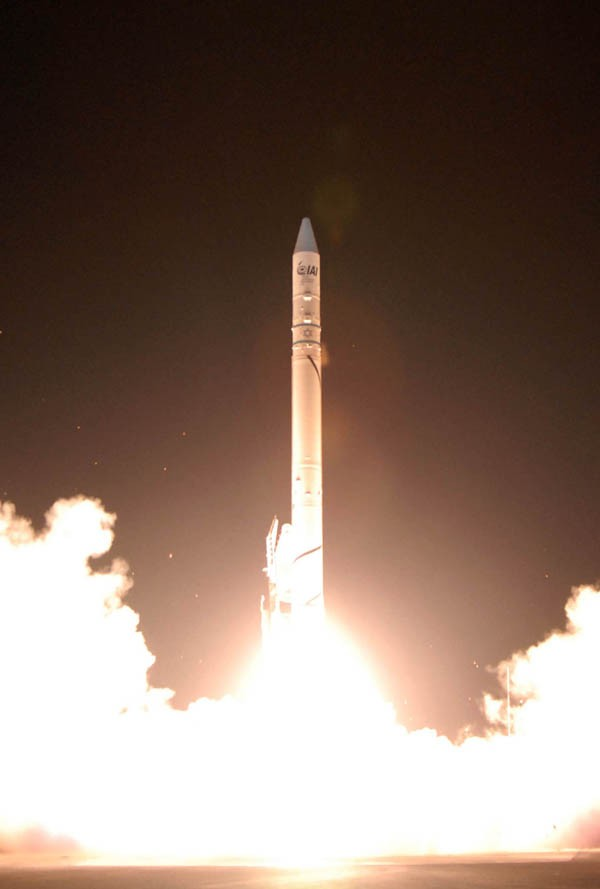
Ofek-7 satellite launch through Shavit vehicle

During the 1970s and 1980s Israel began developing the infrastructure needed for research and development in space exploration and related sciences. Israel launched its first satellite, Ofeq-1, from the locally built Shavit launch vehicle on September 19, 1988, and has made important contributions in a number of areas in space research, including laser communication, research into embryo development and osteoporosis in space, pollution monitoring, and mapping geology, soil and vegetation in semi-arid environments. Israel is among the few countries capable of launching satellites into orbit and locally designed and manufactured satellites have been produced and launched by Israel Aerospace Industries(IAI), Israel's largest military engineering company, in cooperation with the Israel Space Agency. The AMOS-1 geostationary satellite began operations in 1996 as Israel's first commercial communications satellite. It was built primarily for direct-to-home television broadcasting, TV distribution and VSAT services. Further series of AMOS communications satellites (AMOS 2 – 5i) are operated or in development by the Spacecom Satellite Communications company, which provides satellite telecommunications services to countries in Europe, the Middle East and Africa. Israel also develops, manufactures, and exports a large number of related aerospace products, including rockets and satellites, display systems, aeronautical computers, instrumentation systems, drones and flight simulators. Israel's second largest defense company is Elbit Systems, which makes electro-optical systems for air, sea and ground forces; drones; control and monitoring systems; communications systems and more.

The growth in agricultural production is based on close cooperation of scientists, farmers and agriculture-related industries and has resulted in the development of advanced agricultural technology, water-conserving irrigation methods, anaerobic digestion, greenhouse technology, desert agriculture and salinity research. Israeli companies also supply irrigation, water conservation and greenhouse technologies and know-how to other countries. The modern technology of drip irrigation was invented in Israel by Simcha Blass and his son Yeshayahu. Their first experimental system was established in 1959 when company called Netafim was established. They developed and patented the first practical surface drip irrigation emitter. This method was very successful and had spread to Australia, North America and South America by the late 1960s.

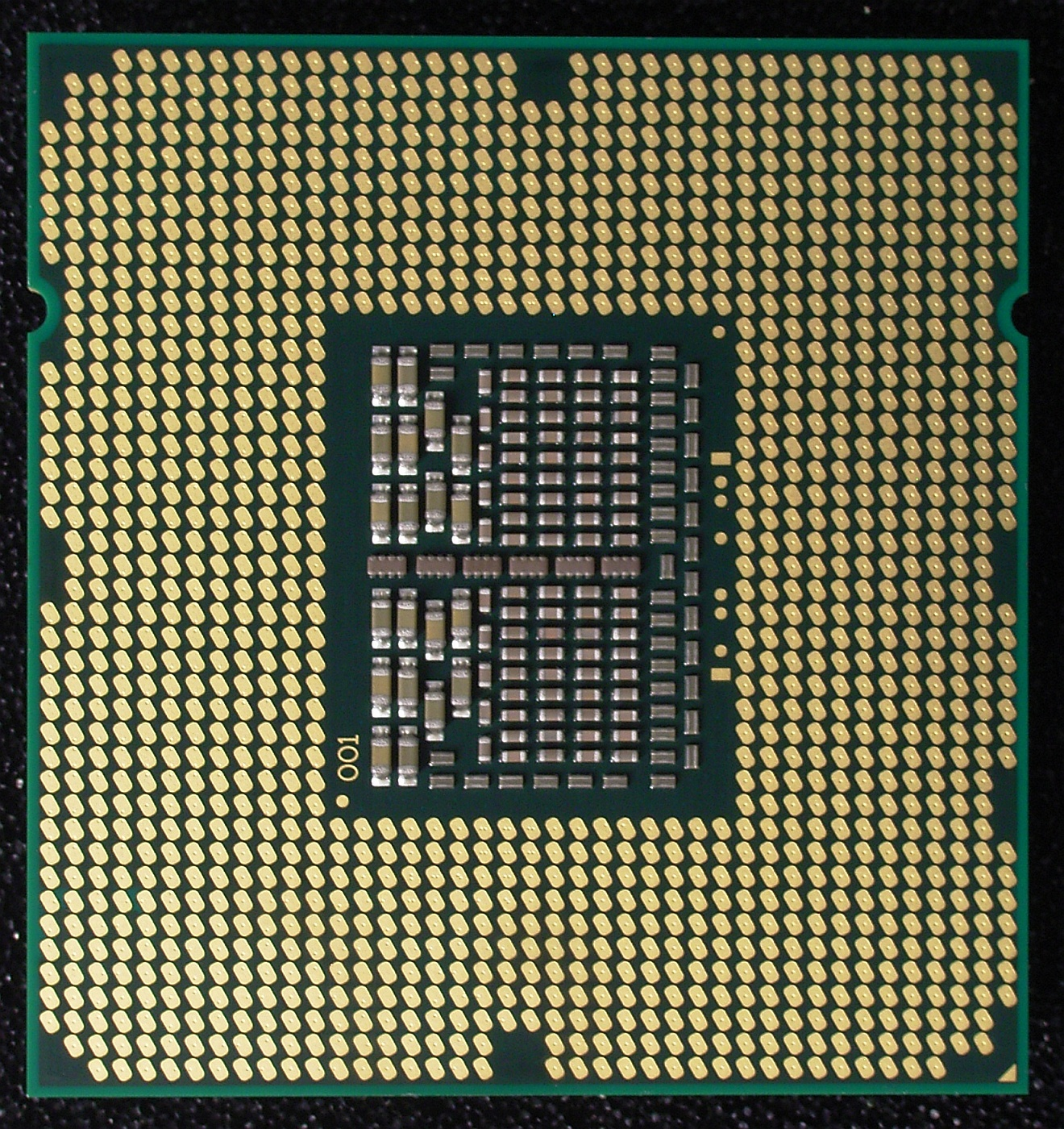
Intel core i7-940. Intel developed its dual-core Core Duo processor at its Israel Development Center in Haifa.

Israeli companies excel in computer software and hardware development, particularly computer security technologies, semiconductors and communications. Israeli firms include Check Point, a leading firewall firm; Amdocs, which makes business and operations support systems for telecoms; Comverse, a voice-mail company; and Mercury Interactive, which measures software performance. A high concentration of high-tech industries in the coastal plain of Israel has led to the nickname Silicon Wadi (lit: "Silicon Valley"). More than 3,850 start-ups have been established in Israel, making it second only to the US in this sector and has the largest number of NASDAQ-listed companies outside North America. Optics, electro-optics, and lasers are significant fields and Israel produces fiber-optics, electro-optic inspection systems for printed circuit boards, thermal imaging night-vision systems, and electro-optics-based robotic manufacturing systems. Research into robotics first began in the late 1970s, has resulted in the production of robots designed to perform a wide variety of computer aided manufacturing tasks, including diamond polishing, welding, packing, and building. Research is also conducted in the application of artificial intelligence to robots.

Israeli scientists contributed many inventions and discoveries in a variety of fields including Joram Lindenstrauss (Johnson–Lindenstrauss lemma); Abraham Fraenkel (Zermelo–Fraenkel set theory); Shimshon Amitsur(Amitsur–Levitzki theorem); Saharon Shelah (Sauer–Shelah lemma); Elon Lindenstrauss (Ergodic theory); Nathan Rosen (Wormhole); Yuval Ne'eman (prediction of Quarks); Yakir Aharonov and David Bohm (Aharonov–Bohm effect); Jacob Bekenstein (formulation of Black holes Entropy); Dan Shechtman (discovery of quasicrystals); Avram Hershko and Aaron Ciechanover (discovery of the role of protein Ubiquitin); Arieh Warshel and Michael Levitt (development of multiscale models for complex chemical systems); Ariel Rubinstein (Rubinstein bargaining model); Moussa B.H. Youdim (Rasagiline); Robert Aumann (Game theory); Michael O. Rabin (Nondeterministic finite automaton); Amir Pnueli (Temporal logic); Judea Pearl (artificial intelligence); Shafi Goldwasser (Interactive proof system); Asher Peres (Quantum information); Adi Shamir (RSA, Differential cryptanalysis, Shamir's Secret Sharing); Yaakov Ziv and Abraham Lempel (Lempel–Ziv–Welch); Notable inventions include ReWalk, Given Imaging, Eshkol-Wachman movement notation, Taliglucerase alfa, USB flash drive, Intel 8088, Projection keyboard, TDMoIP, Mobileye, Waze, Wix.com, Gett, Viber, Uzi, Iron Dome, Arrow missile, Super-iron battery, Epilator.

Abraham Fraenkel	Michael O. Rabin	Robert Aumann	Daniel Kahneman	Dan Shechtman	Ada Yonath

== Visual arts ==
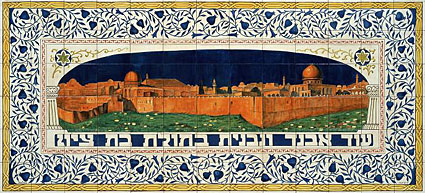
Tiles in the Bezalel style, 1920s

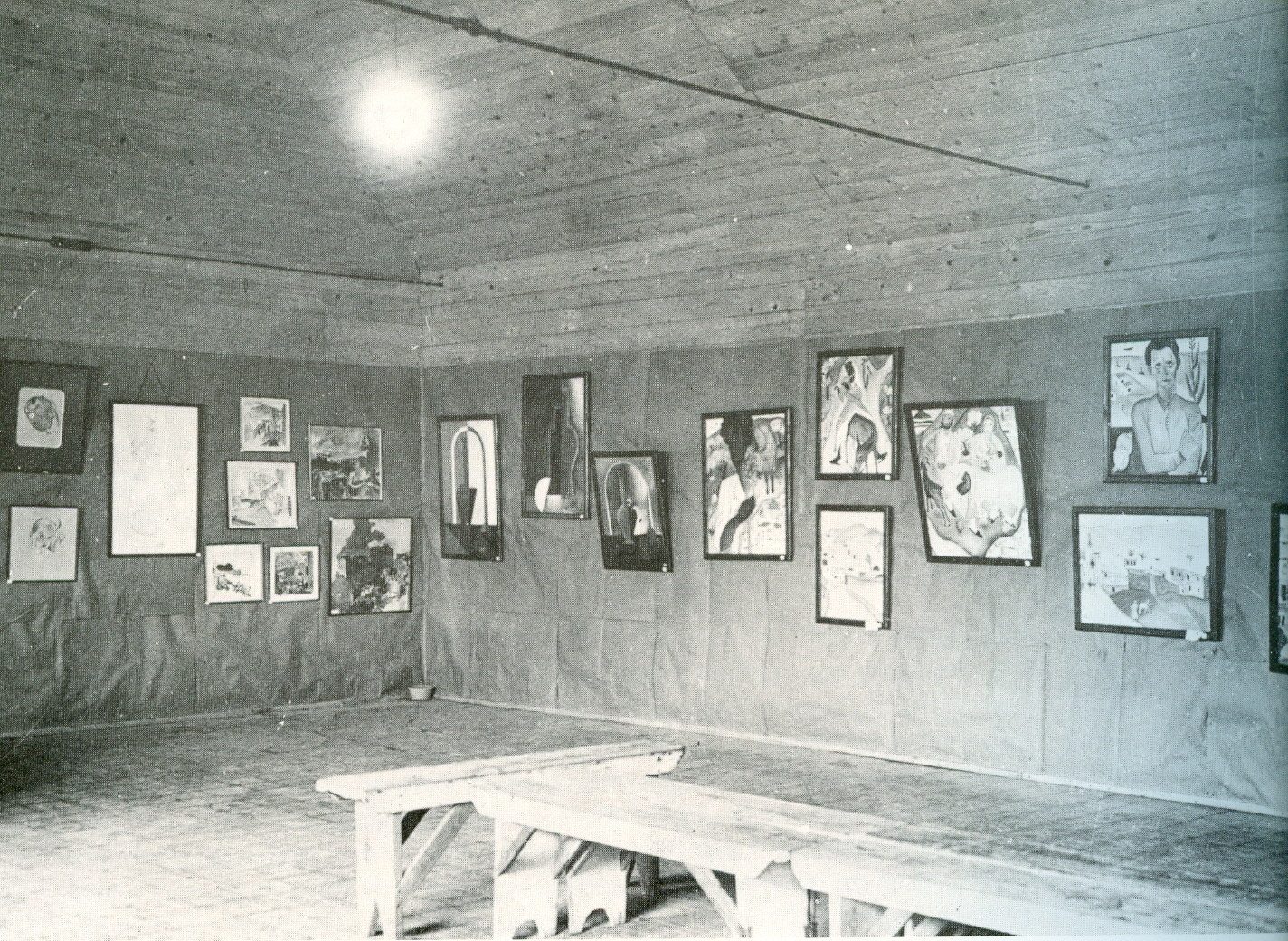
First modern art exhibition in Israel at the Ohel Theatre 1926, organized primarily by the Histadrut art studio

From the beginning of the 20th century, visual arts in Israel have shown a creative orientation, influenced both by the West and East, as well as by the land itself, its development, the character of the cities, and stylistic trends emanating from art centers abroad. In painting, sculpture, photography, and other art forms, the country's varied landscape is the protagonist: the hill terraces and ridges produce special dynamics of line and shape; the foothills of the Negev, the prevailing grayish-green vegetation, and the clear luminous light result in distinctive color effects; and the sea and sand affect surfaces. On the whole, local landscapes, concerns, and politics lie at the center of Israeli art, and ensure its uniqueness.

The earliest Israeli art movement was the Bezalel school of the Ottoman and early Mandate period, when artists portrayed both Biblical and Zionist subjects in a style influenced by the European Art Nouveau movement, symbolism, and traditional Persian, Jewish, and Syrian artistry.

During the 1920s, the art scene saw a drastic shift with the growing influence of modern European art, chief among them the influence of the French Ecole de Paris on the Yishuv. Yitzhak Frenkel Frenel was the heralder of this movement and the first to teach in a modern style akin to the manner in France. The first abstract painter in Israel, he opened the Histadrut Art Studio in Tel Aviv (1926-1929). Artists that learned under Frenkel such as Moshe Castel, Shimshon Holzman and others would venture to Paris themselves and return, increasing the influence of Paris on the early Israeli art scene. At the same time, the Israeli art scene shifted from Jerusalem to Tel Aviv. The latter, which became the center of Hebrew literature and theatre, was also the new center of modern art in the country (this expressed itself in the opening of Frenkel's art studio in Tel Aviv, as well as modern art exhibitions such as the Ohel's Modern Artists Exhibition).

The city of Safed had a vibrant artists' quarter due to Safed's artistic appeal, drawing painters from all art movements to Safed during the summer up until the late 70s. Today Israeli artists have ventured into Optical Art, digital art, AI art and more. Israel also has a vibrant street art scene; southern Tel Aviv is a hotspot of street Art culture.

== Symbols ==
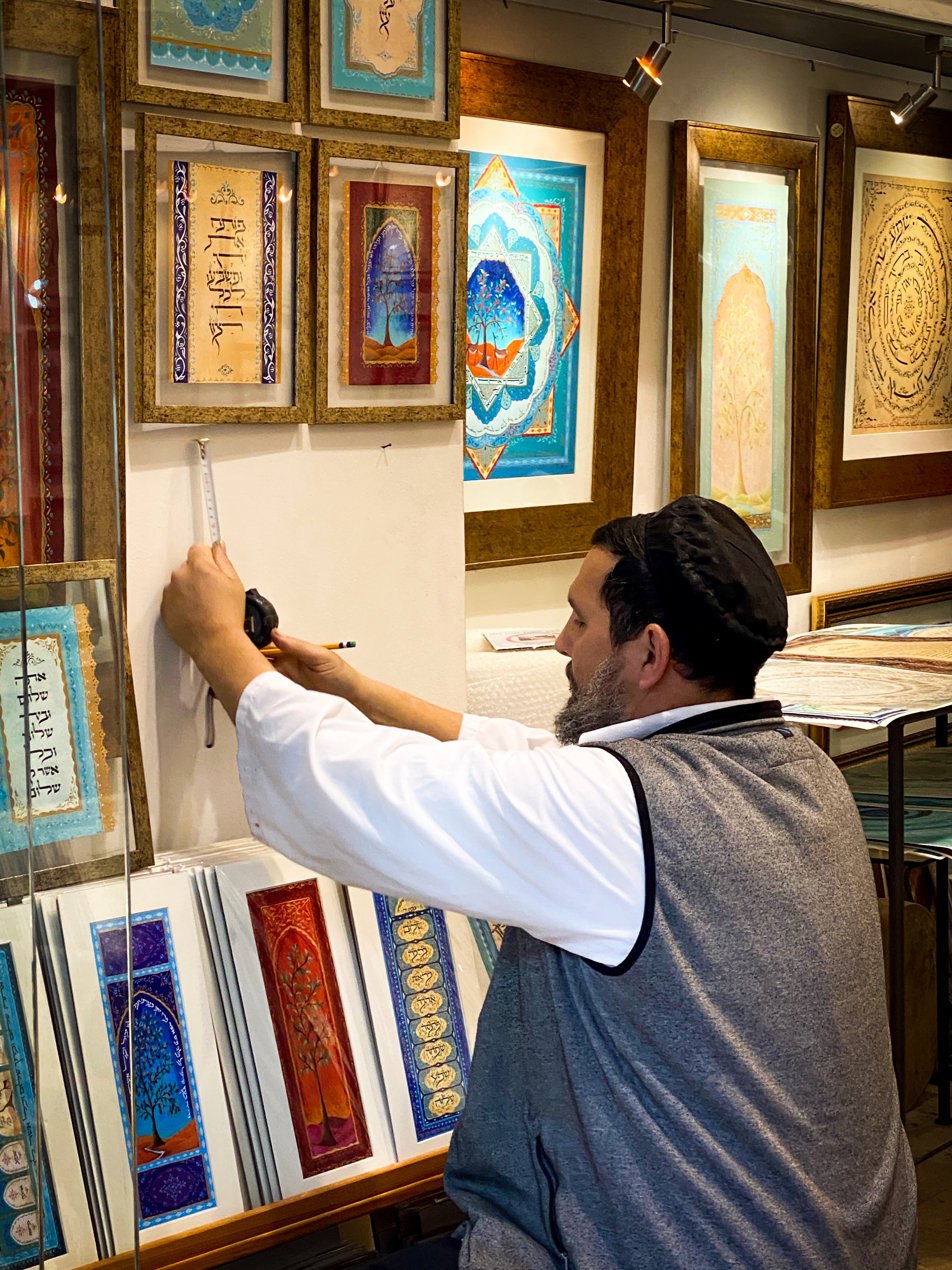
Jewish symbols in Israeli artworks

Jewish various symbols are omnipresent in the culture of Israel. The Jewish diversity of Israel enrich the culture with a variety of traditions, symbols and handicrafts.

The national symbols of Israel are influenced by Jewish symbols and Jewish history to represent the country and its people.

== Performance art ==
=== Music ===
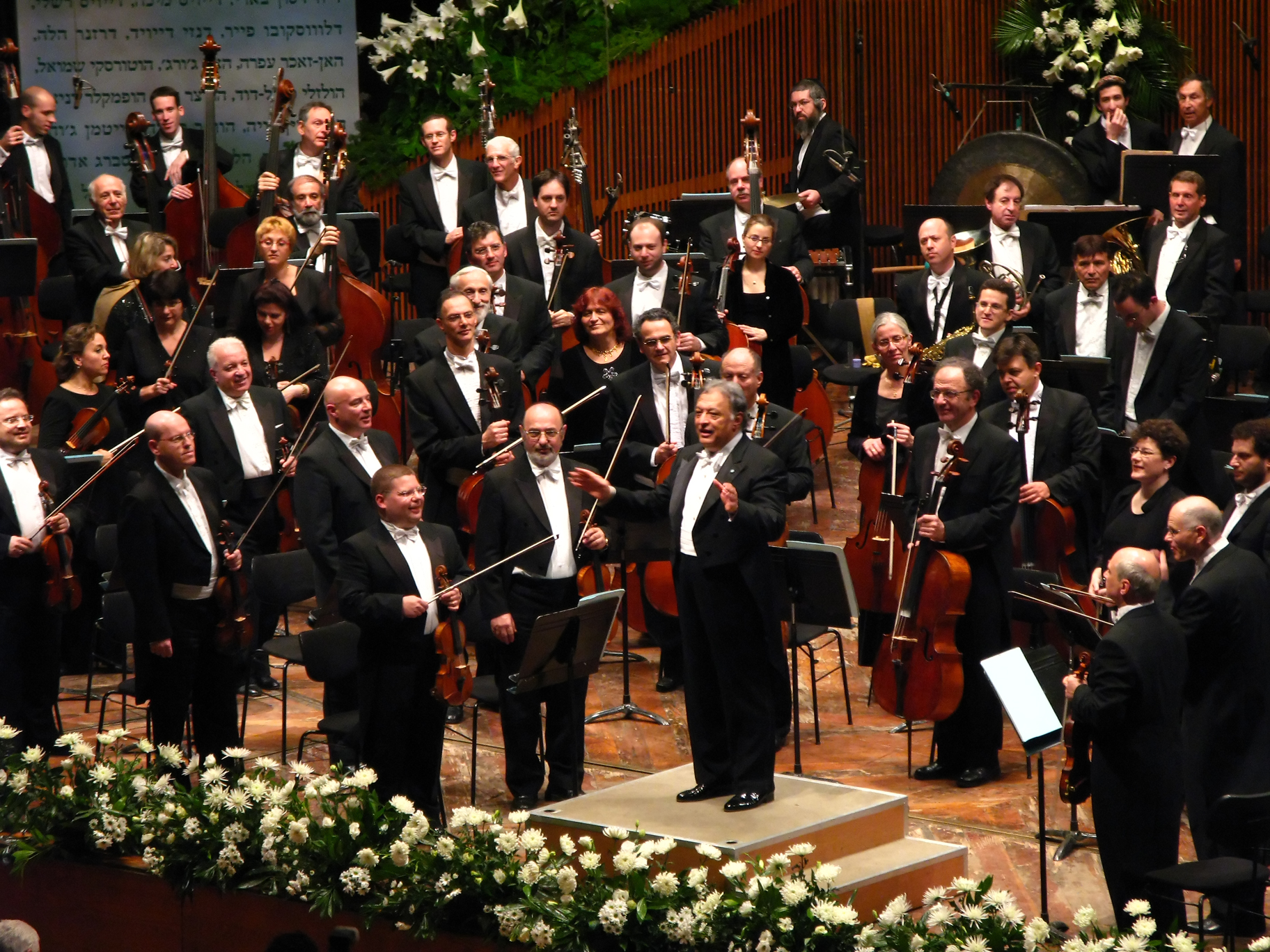
Israel Philharmonic Orchestra, 2006

Classical music in Israel has been vibrant since the 1930s, when hundreds of music teachers and students, composers, instrumentalists and singers, as well as thousands of music lovers, streamed into the country, driven by the threat of Nazism in Europe. Israel is also home to several world-class classical music ensembles, such as the Israel Philharmonic and the New Israeli Opera. The founding of The Palestine Philharmonic Orchestra (today the Israel Philharmonic Orchestra) in 1936 marked the beginning of Israel's classical music scene. In the early 1980s, the New Israeli Opera began staging productions, reviving public enthusiasm for operatic works. Russian immigration in the 1990s boosted the classical music arena with new talents, and music lovers.

The modern music scene in Israel spans the spectrum of musical genres, and often fuses many musical influences, ranging from Ethiopian, Middle-Eastern soul, rock, jazz, hip-hop, electronic, Arabic, pop and mainstream. Israeli music is versatile, and combines elements of both western and eastern music. It tends to be very eclectic, and contains a wide variety of influences from the Diaspora, as well as more modern cultural importations: Hassidic songs, Asian pop, Arab folk (especially by Yemenite singers), and Israeli hip-hop or heavy metal. Also popular are various forms of electronic music, including trance, Hard trance, and Goa trance. Notable artists from Israel in this field are few, but include the psychedelic trance duo Infected Mushroom.

=== Dance ===
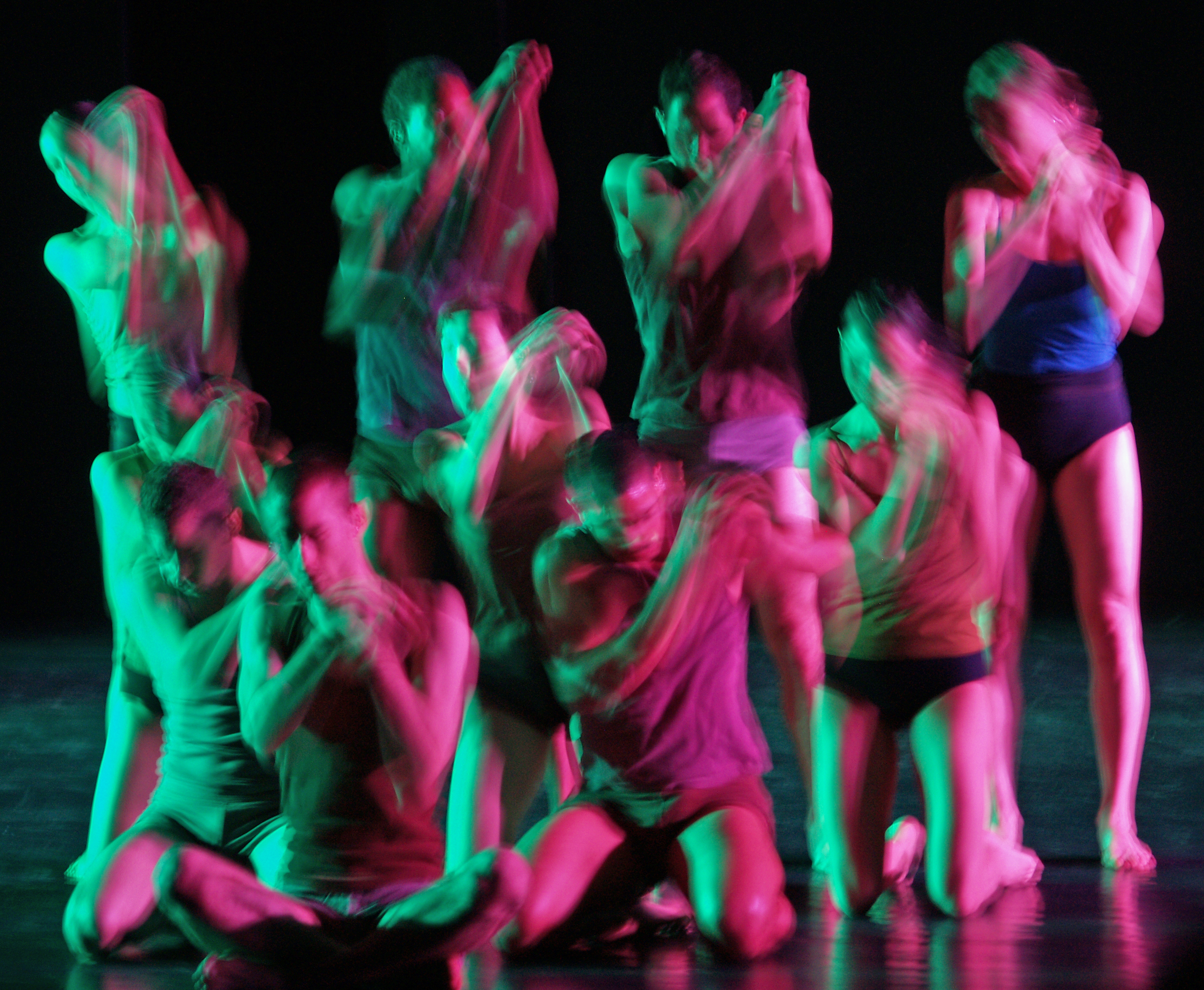
Batsheva Dance Company co-founded by Martha Graham and Baroness Batsheva De Rothschild in 1964

Traditional folk dances of Israel include the Horah and dances incorporating the Tza’ad Temani. Israeli folk dancing today is choreographed for recreational and performance dance groups.

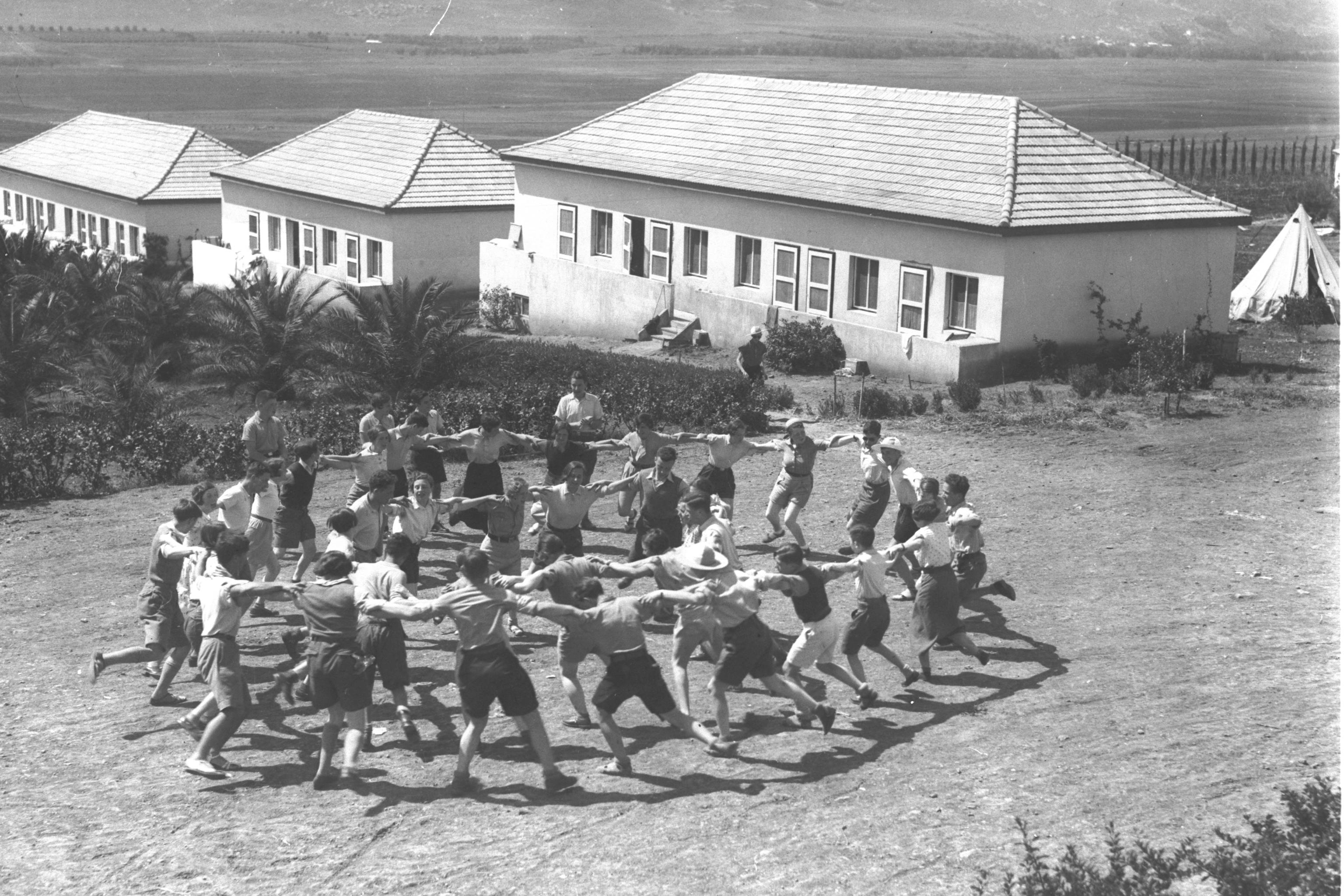
Jewish youth dancing the Horah in the kibboutz Ein Harod in 1936

Modern dance in Israel has won international acclaim. Israeli choreographers, among them Ohad Naharin and Barak Marshall, are considered among the most versatile and original international creators working today. Notable Israeli dance companies include the Batsheva Dance Company, the Kibbutz Contemporary Dance Company, the Inbal Pinto & Avshalom Pollak Dance Company and the Kamea Dance Company. People come from all over Israel and many other nations for the annual dance festival in Karmiel, held in July. First held in 1988, the Karmiel Dance Festival is the largest celebration of dance in Israel, featuring three or four days and nights of dancing, with 5,000 or more dancers and a quarter of a million spectators in the capital of Galilee. Begun as an Israeli folk dance event, the festivities now include performances, workshops, and open dance sessions for a variety of dance forms and nationalities. Choreographer Yonatan Karmon created the Karmiel Dance Festival to continue the tradition of Gurit Kadman's Dalia Festival of Israeli dance, which ended in the 1960s.

Famous companies and choreographers from all over the world have come to Israel to perform and give master classes. In July 2010, Mikhail Baryshnikov came to perform in Israel.

=== Theatre ===
==== Roman Judea ====
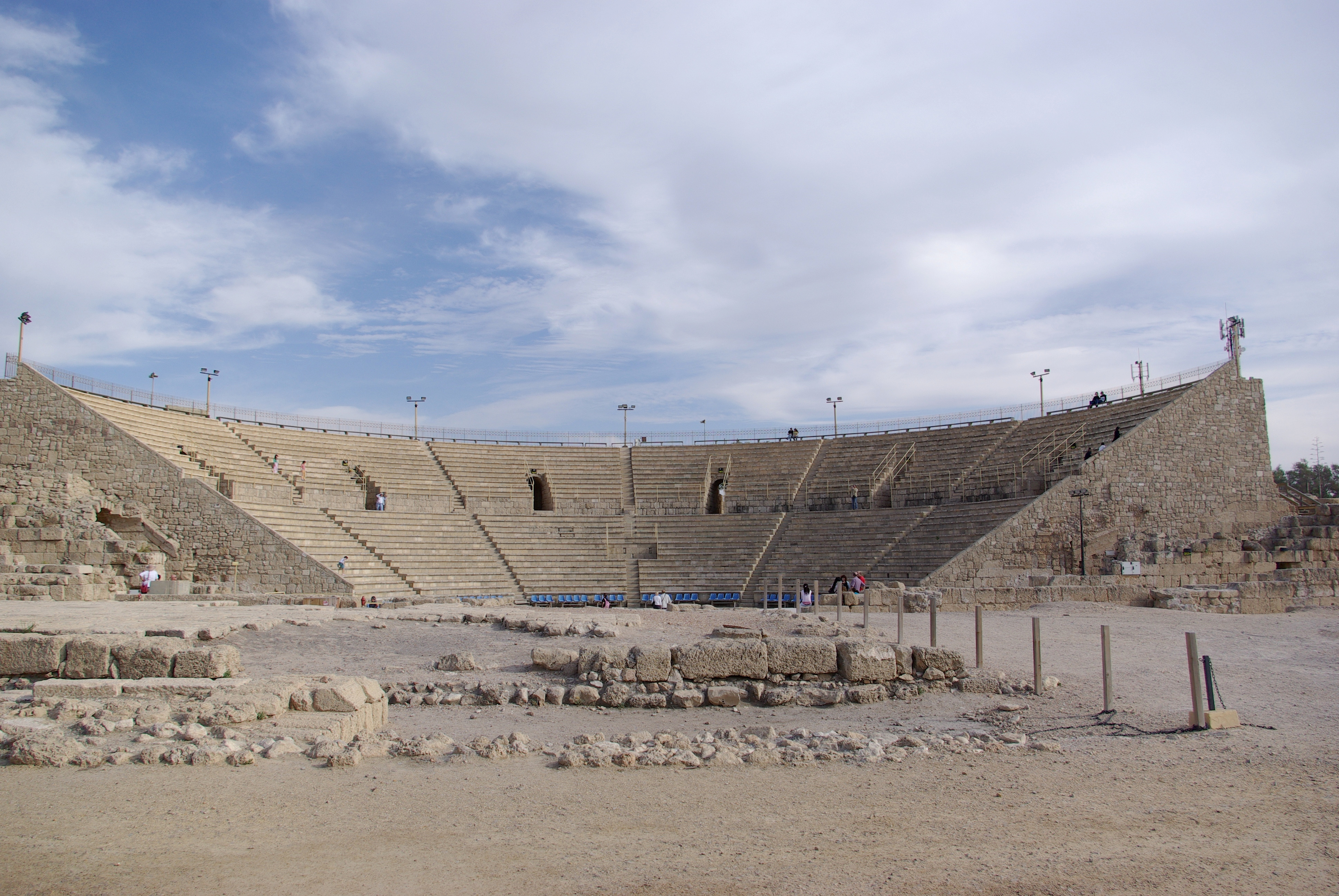
Remains of the Roman theatre in Caesarea Maritima

During the Roman rule, some theatres were built in Judea, located in places such as Caesarea, Beth Shean and Jerusalem. The theatre in Caesarea Maritima was built by Herod the Great and had a seating capacity of about 4000 seats in its final stage. Another theatre, in Bet Shean, was built in the end of the 2nd century CE with a capacity of 7000 seats.

==== Modern Israel ====
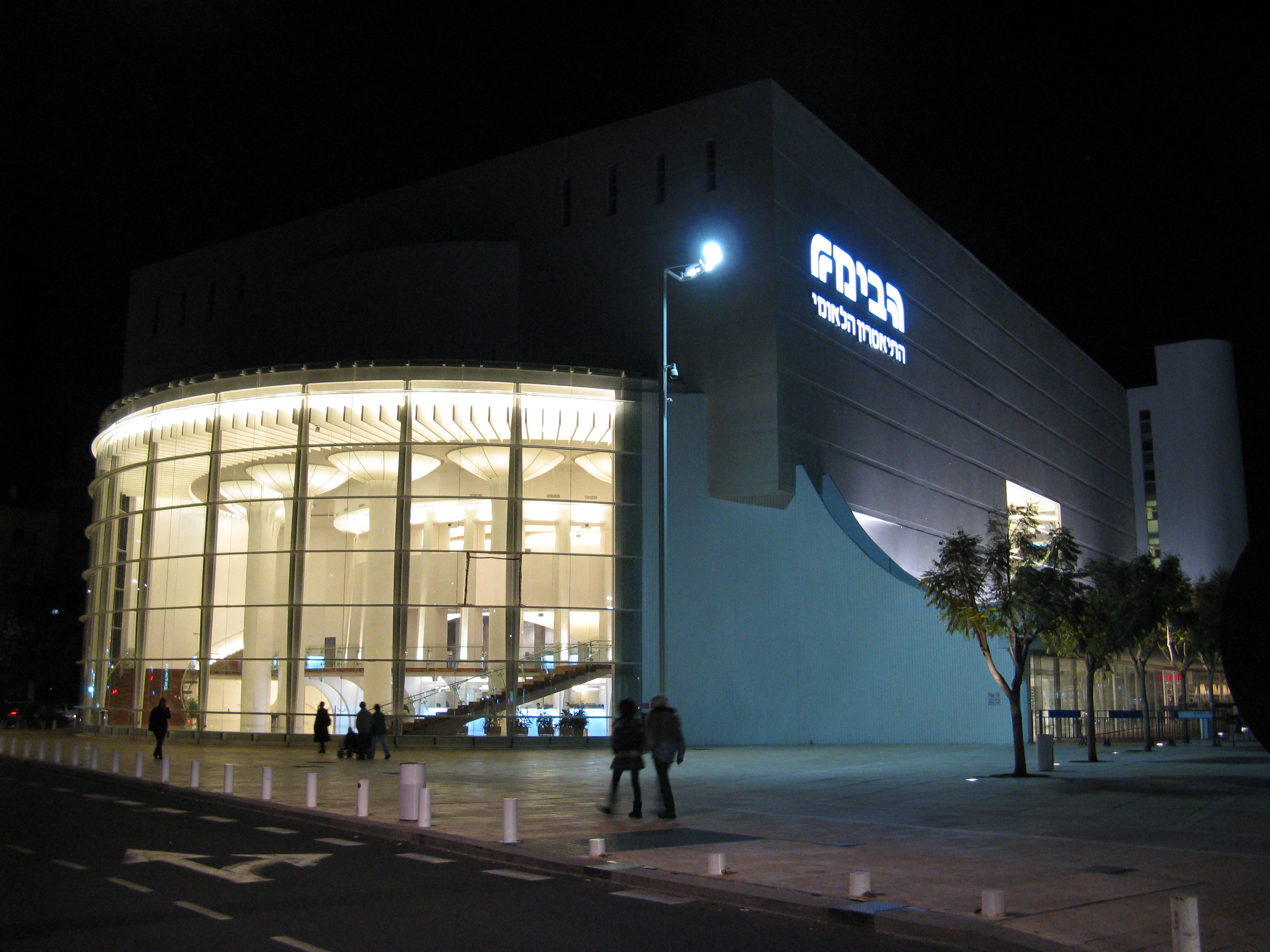
Habimah Theatre in Tel Aviv

The emergence of Hebrew theatre predated the state by nearly 50 years. The first amateur Hebrew theatre group was active in Ottoman Palestine from 1904 to 1914. The first professional Hebrew theatre, Habimah, was founded in Moscow in 1917, and moved to British Mandatory Palestine in 1931, where it became the country's national theatre. The Ohel Theatre was founded in 1925 as a workers' theatre that explored socialist and biblical themes. The first Hebrew plays revolved around pioneering.

After 1948, two major motifs were the Holocaust and the Arab-Israeli conflict. Moshe Shamir's He Walked in the Fields in 1949 was the first produced by a sabra writing about sabras in idiomatic and contemporary Hebrew. In the 1950s, dramatists portrayed the gap between pre-state dreams and disillusionment. Other plays pitted native Israelis against Holocaust survivors. Beginning in the 1960s, Hanoch Levin wrote 56 plays and political satires. During the 1970s, Israeli theatre became more critical, contrasting extreme images of Israeli identity, such as the muscleman and the spiritual Jew. In the 1980s, Joshua Sobol explored Israeli-Jewish identity issues. Today, Israeli theatre is extremely diverse in content and style, and half of all plays are local productions.

Other major theatre companies include the Cameri Theatre, Bet Lessin Theatre, Gesher Theatre (which performs in Hebrew and Russian), Haifa Theatre and Beersheba Theatre.

Founded in 1980, The Acco Festival of Alternative Israeli Theatre is a four-day performing arts festival held annually in early autumn at the city of Acre. the festival became a symbol of coexistence between the city's Jewish and Arab inhabitants.

=== Cinema ===
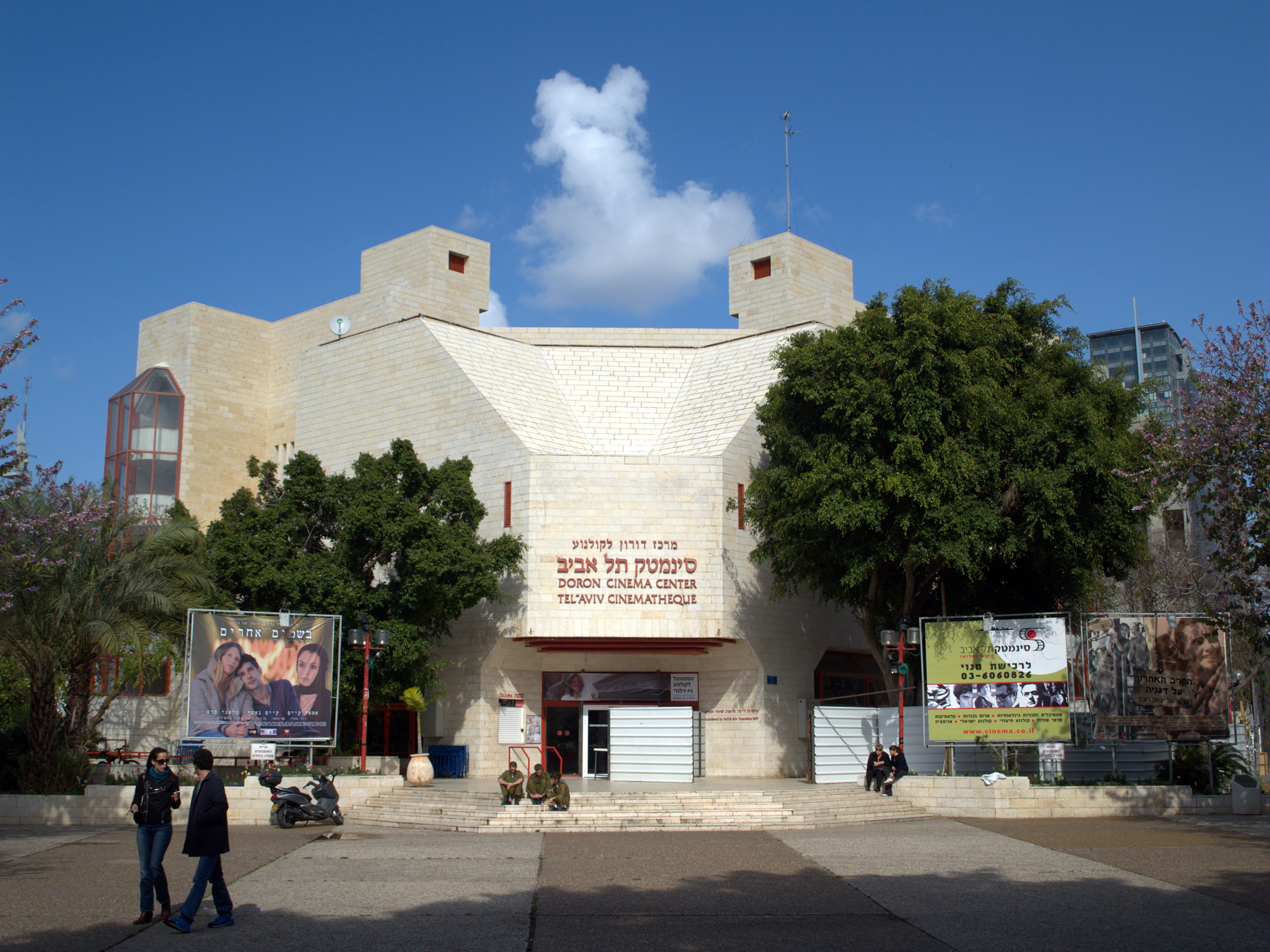
Tel Aviv Cinematheque

Filmmaking in Israel has undergone major developments since its inception in the 1950s. The first features produced and directed by Israelis, such as "Hill 24 Doesn't Answer" and "They Were Ten", tended, like Israeli literature of the period, to be cast in the heroic mold. Some recent films remain deeply rooted in the Israeli experience, dealing with such subjects as Holocaust survivors and their children (Gila Almagor's "The Summer of Aviya" and its sequel, "Under the Domim Tree") and the travails of new immigrants ("Sh'hur", directed by Hannah Azoulai and Shmuel Hasfari, "Late Marriage" directed by Dover Koshashvili).

Others deal with issues of modern-day Israeli life, such as the Israeli-Arab conflict (Eran Riklis's "The Lemon Tree", Scandar Copti and Yaron Shani's "Ajami") and military service (Joseph Cedar's "Beaufort", Samuel Maoz's "Lebanon", Eytan Fox's "Yossi and Jagger"). Some are set in the context of a universalist, alienated, and hedonistic society (Eytan Fox's "A Siren's Song" and "The Bubble", Ayelet Menahemi and Nirit Yaron's "Tel Aviv Stories").

The Israeli film industry continues to gain worldwide recognition through International awards nominations. For three years consecutively, Israeli films (Beaufort (2008), Waltz with Bashir (2009) and Ajami (2010)) were nominated for Academy Awards. The Spielberg Film Archive at the Hebrew University of Jerusalem is the world's largest repository of film material on Jewish themes as well as on Jewish and Israeli life.

The main international film festivals in Israel are the Jerusalem Film Festival and Haifa Film Festival.

== Museums ==
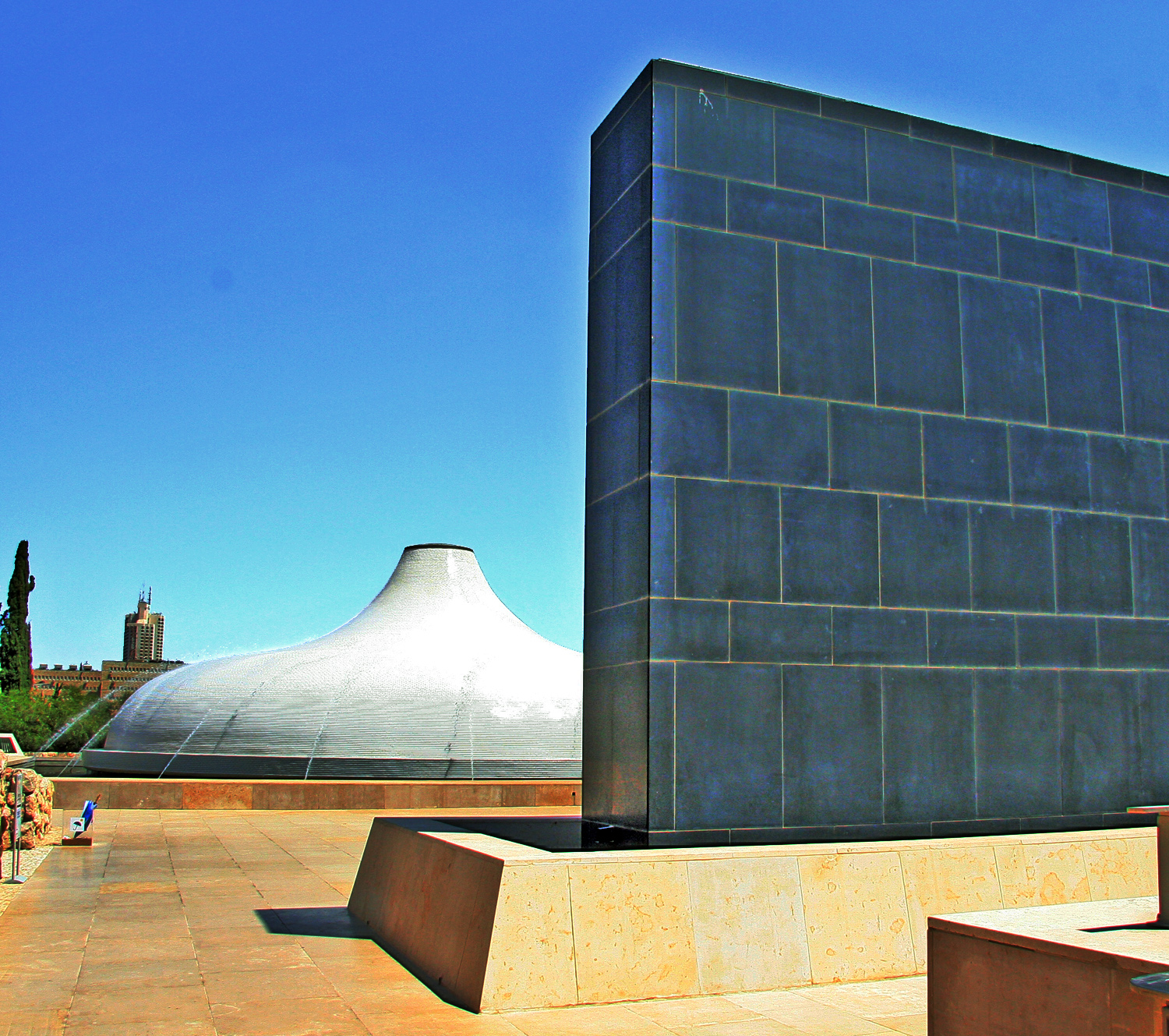
Shrine of the Book, Israel Museum, Jerusalem

Israel's museums, numbering over 200, draw millions of visitors annually.

Jerusalem's Israel Museum has a special pavilion showcasing the Dead Sea Scrolls and a large collection of Jewish religious art, Israeli art, sculptures and Old Masters paintings. Newspapers appear in dozens of languages, and every city and town publishes a local newsletter.

== Architecture ==
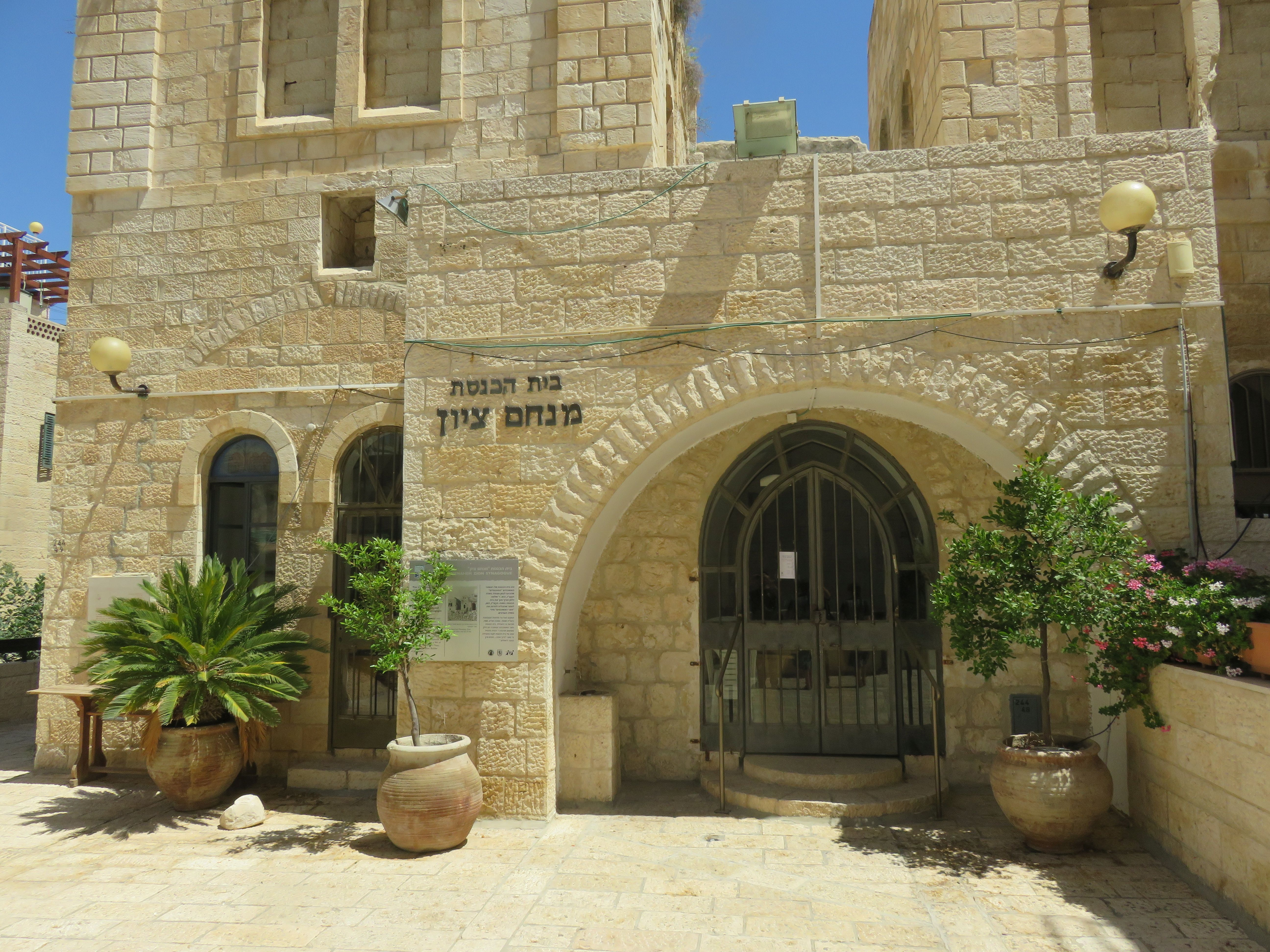
Menahem Zion synagoge, Jewish Quarter of Jerusalem

The old town of cities in Israel are composed of a variety of architectural styles, which is reflected in the synagogue architecture of Jewish quarters.

After 1850, the Jewish architecture began to open up to European influences, and tried to restore an ancient Biblical architecture. Notably, Mishkenot Sha'ananim was built, with inspiration from Mediterranean architecture. Until the 1920s, most structures are built in eclectic style and later, Modern architecture is further developed, notably in the "White City", known for its International Style.

The rural architecture of communities of kibbutzim and moshavim consist of small, white-walled houses with red roofs, and are a symbol of Israel.

== Cuisine ==
The heterogeneous nature of culture in Israel is also manifested in Israeli cuisine, a diverse combination of local ingredients and dishes, with diasporic dishes from around the world. An Israeli fusion cuisine has developed, with the adoption and continued adaption of elements of various Jewish styles of cuisine including Mizrahi, Sephardic, Yemenite Jewish and Ashkenazi, and many foods traditionally eaten in the Middle East. Israeli cuisine is also influenced by geography, giving prominence to foods common in the Mediterranean region such as olives, chickpeas, dairy products, fish, and fresh fruits and vegetables. The main meal is usually lunch rather than dinner. Jewish holidays influence the cuisine, with many traditional foods served at holiday times. Shabbat dinner, eaten on Friday night, is a significant meal in a large proportion of Israeli homes. While not all Jews in Israel keep kosher, the observance of kashrut influences the menu in homes, public institutions and many restaurants.

In 2013, an Israeli cookbook, Seafoodpedia, won "Best in World" in its category at the Gourmand World Cookbook Award in Paris, and Jerusalem: A Cookbook, published by the Israeli-Palestinian team of Yotam Ottolenghi and Sami Tamimi, won "Best in the World" for Mediterranean Cuisine.

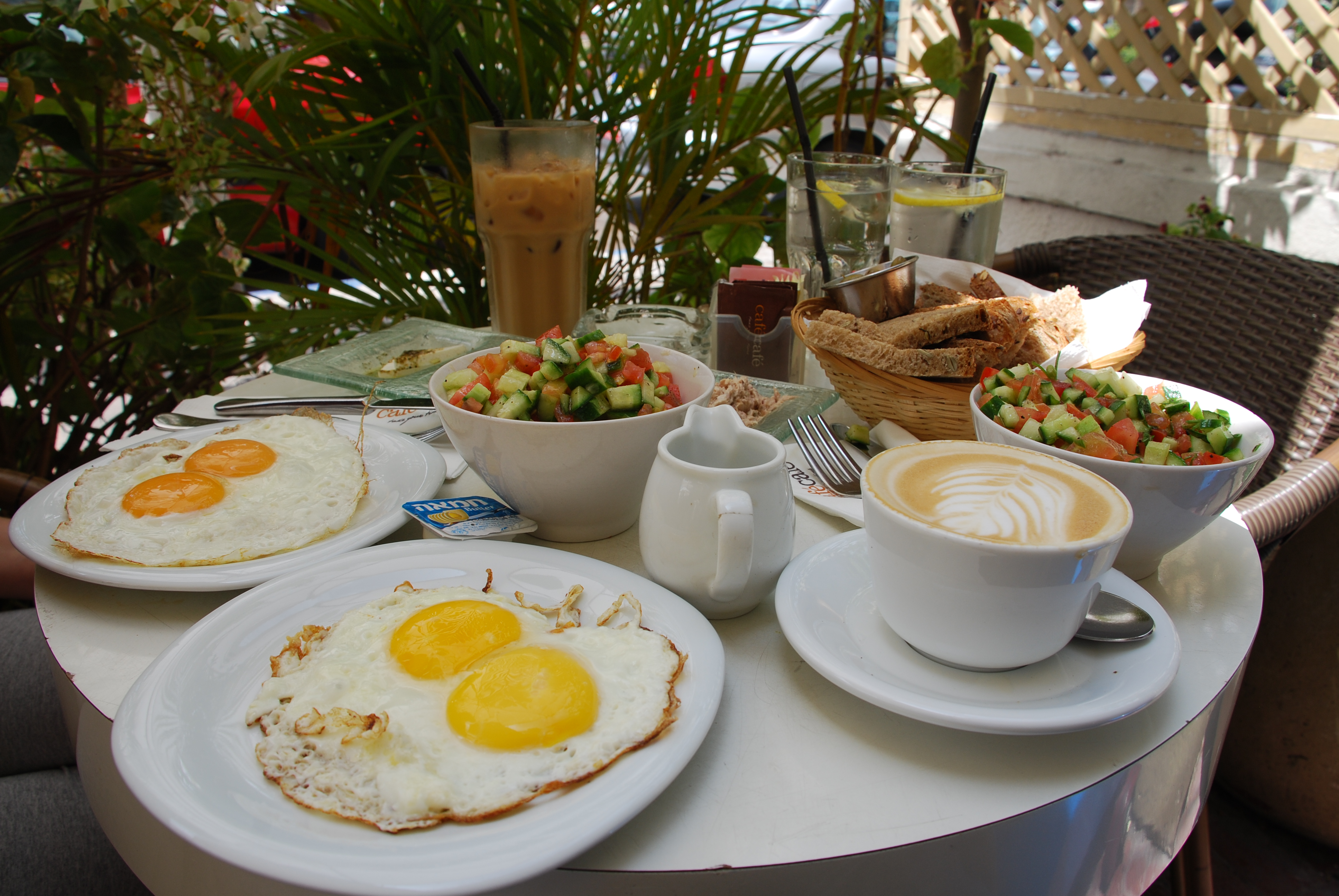
Israeli breakfast

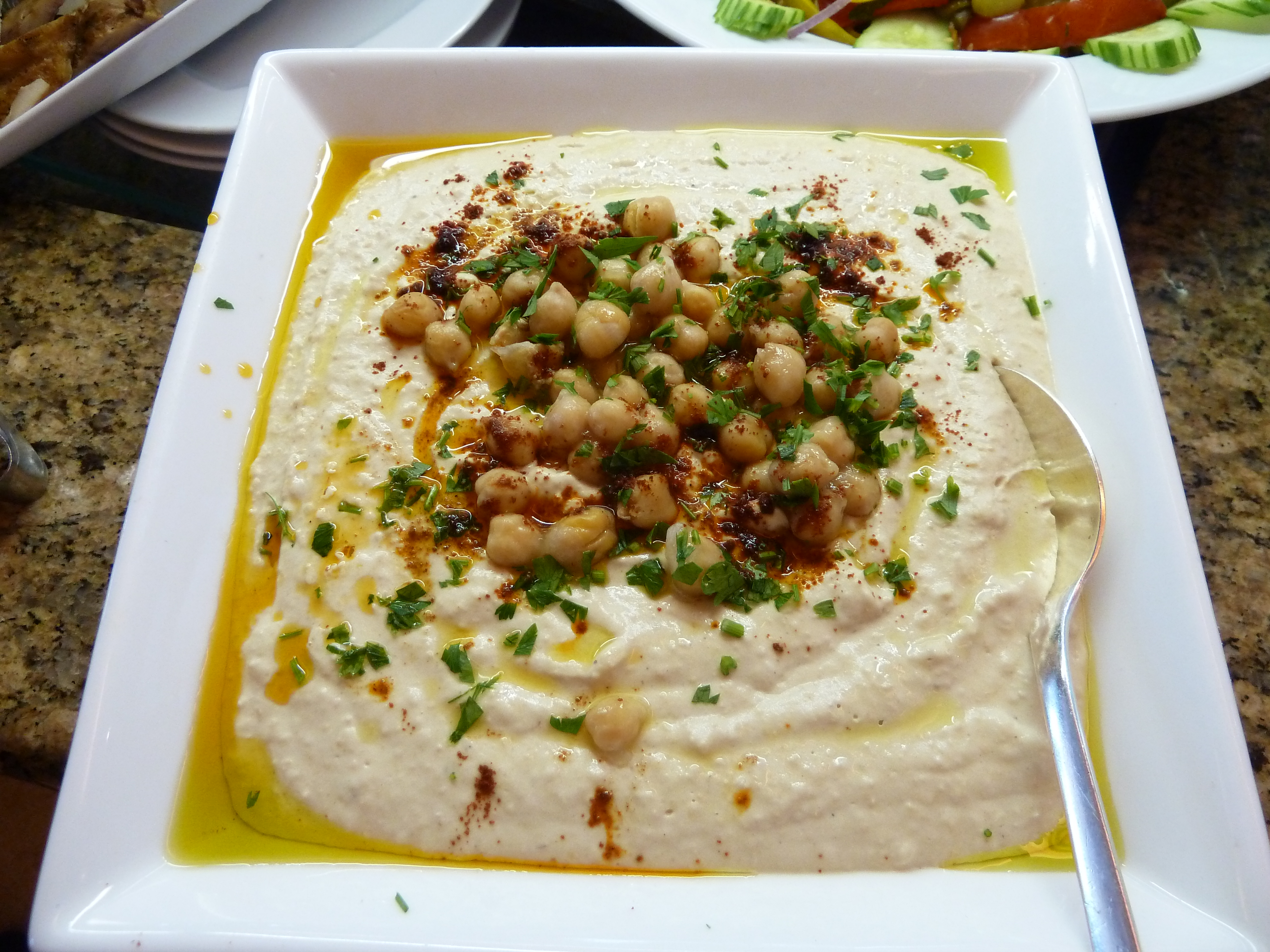
Hummus

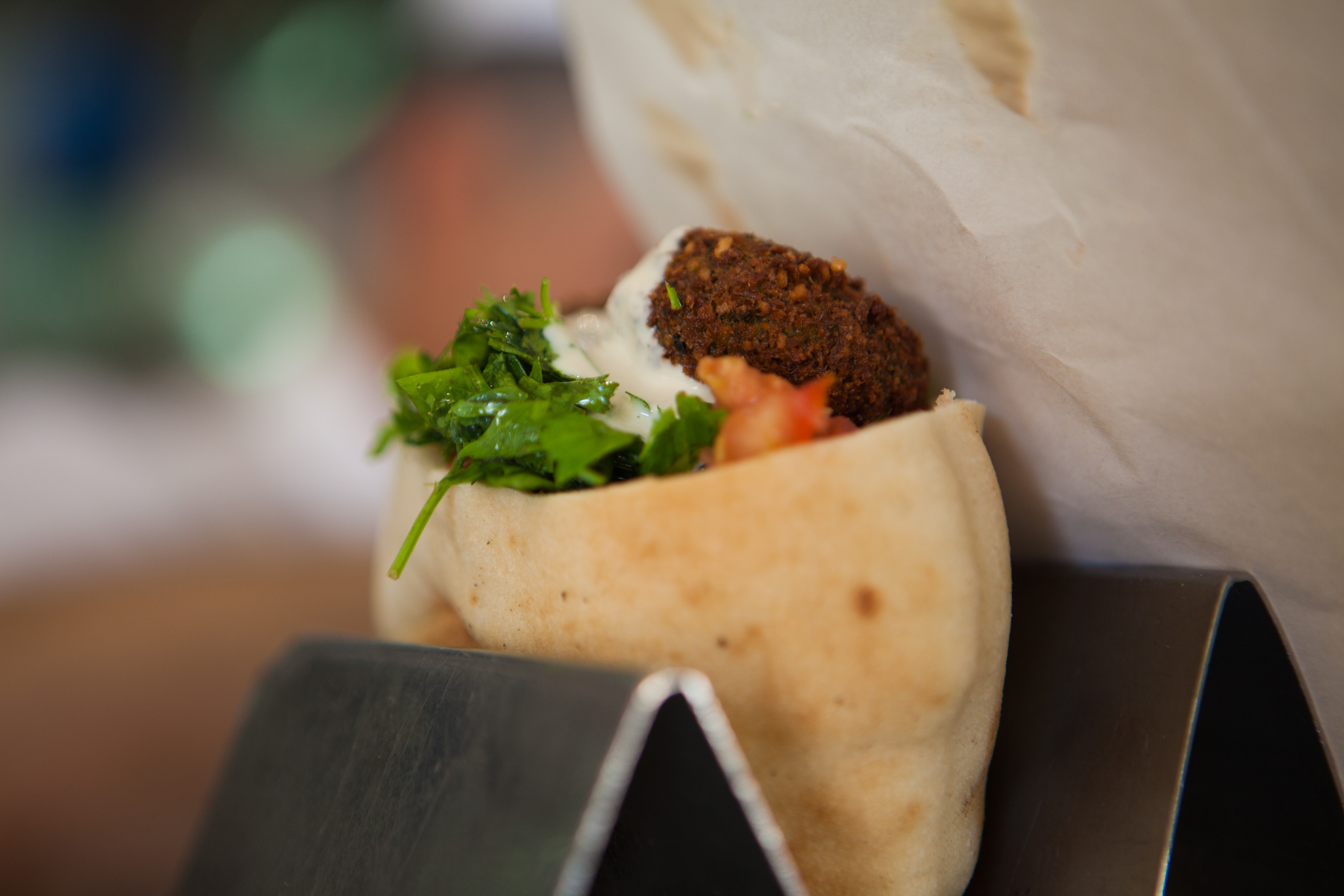
Falafel stuffed in pita with Israeli salad

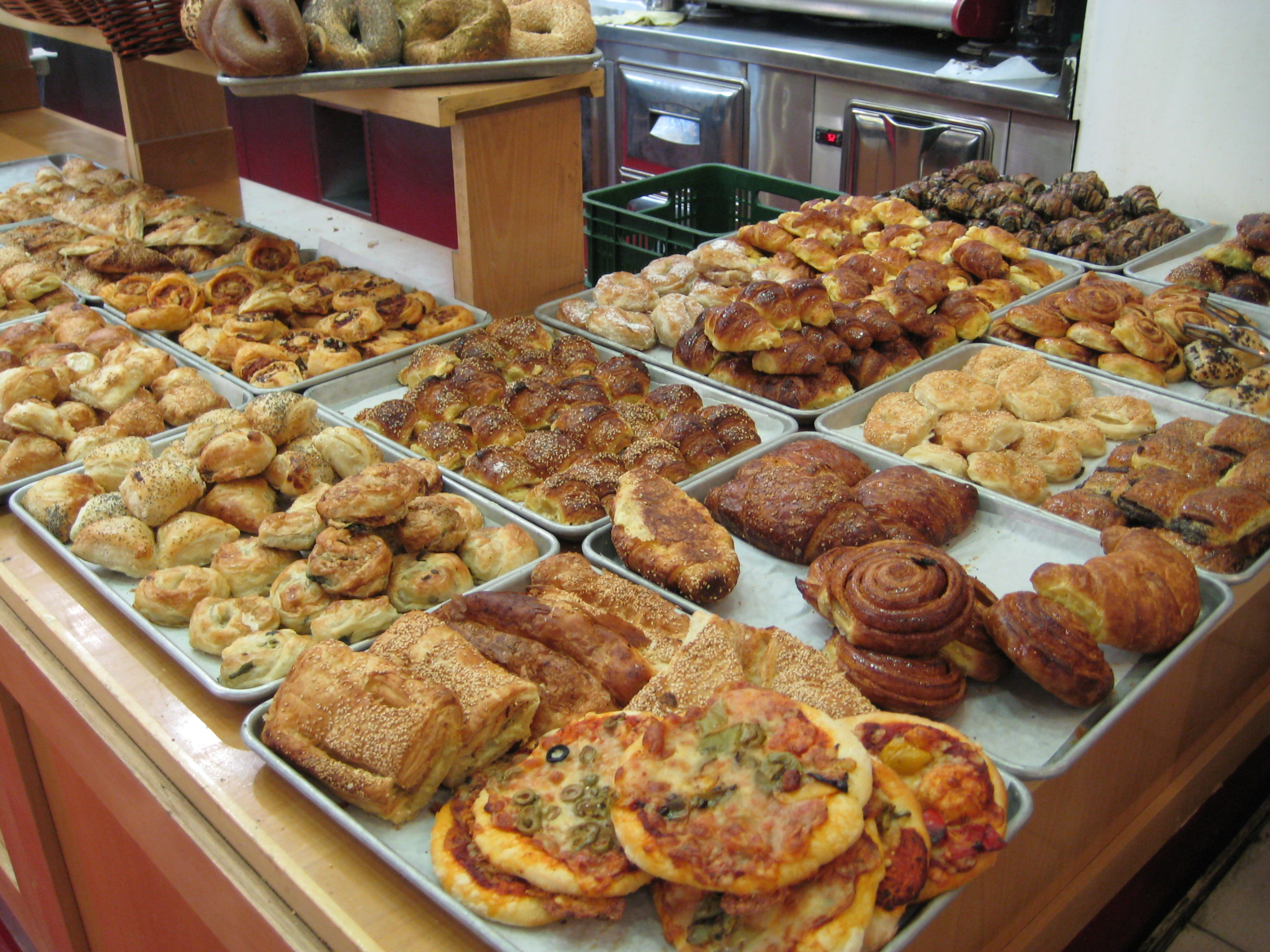
Pastries in Jerusalem

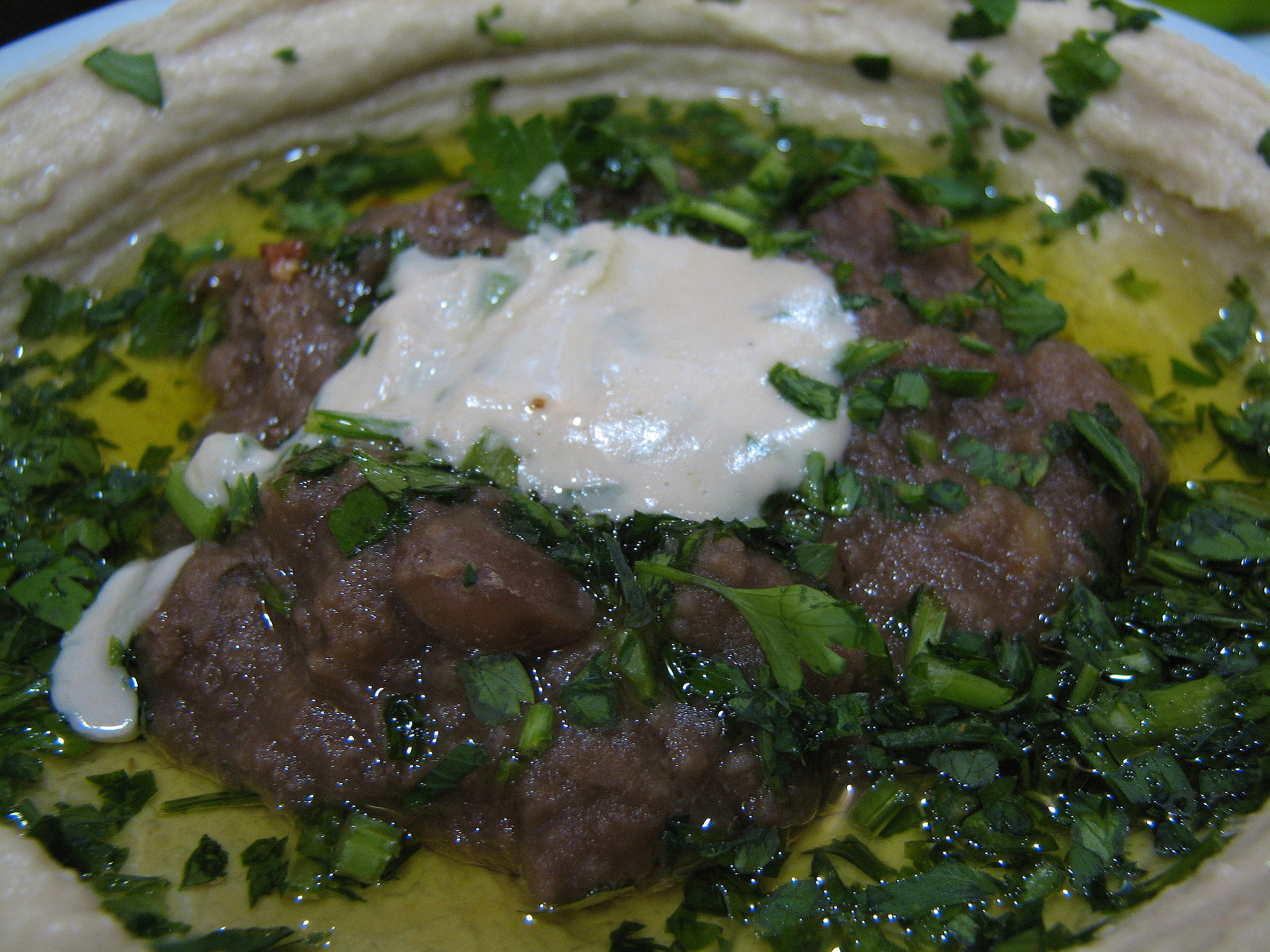
Hummus, Fava beans and Tahini

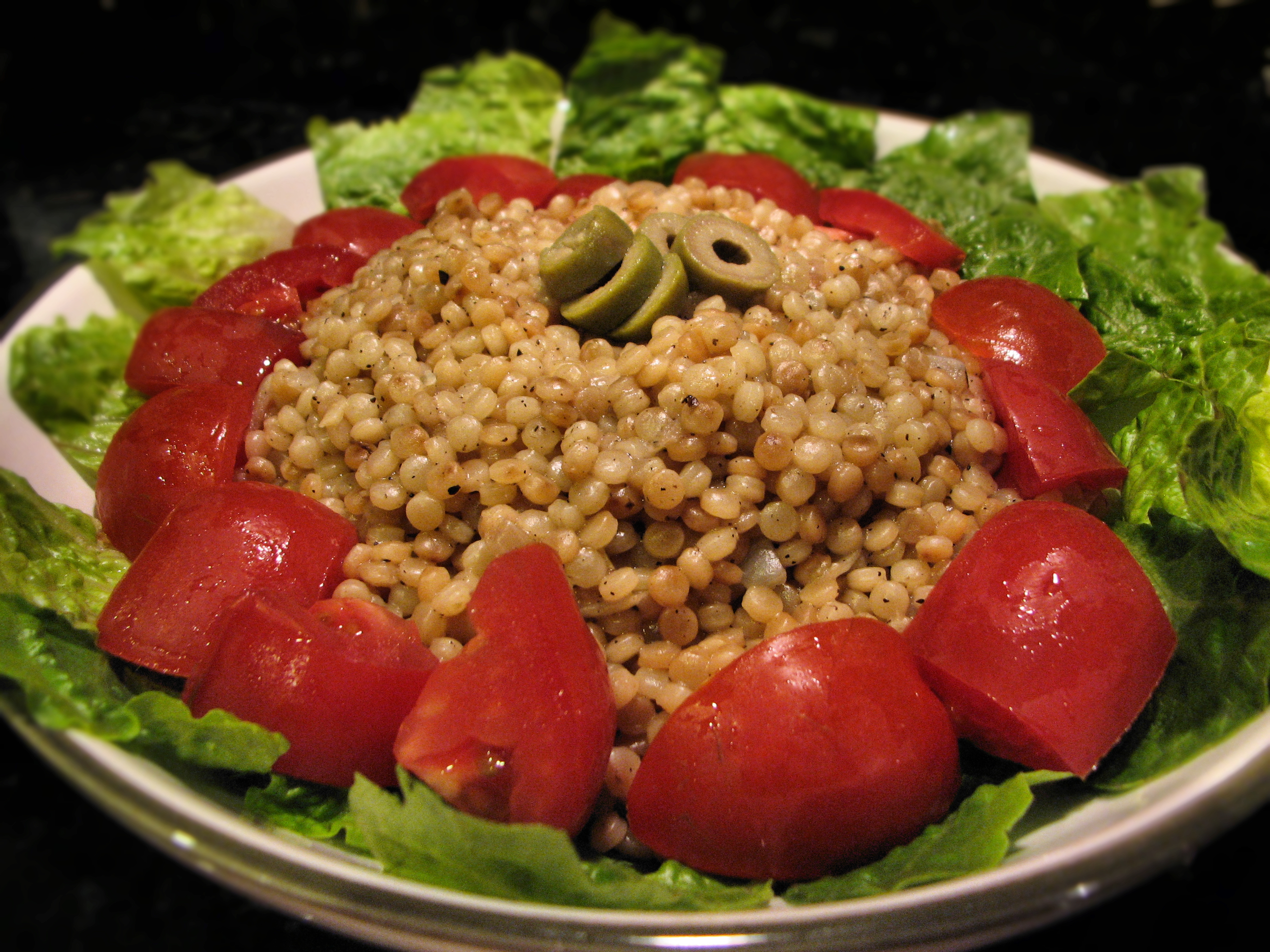
Ptitim

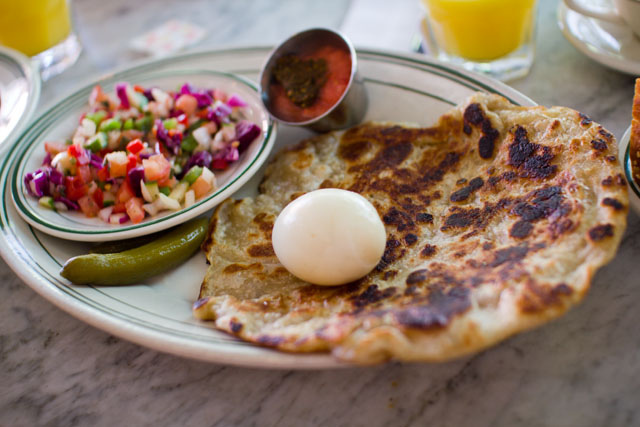
Malawach

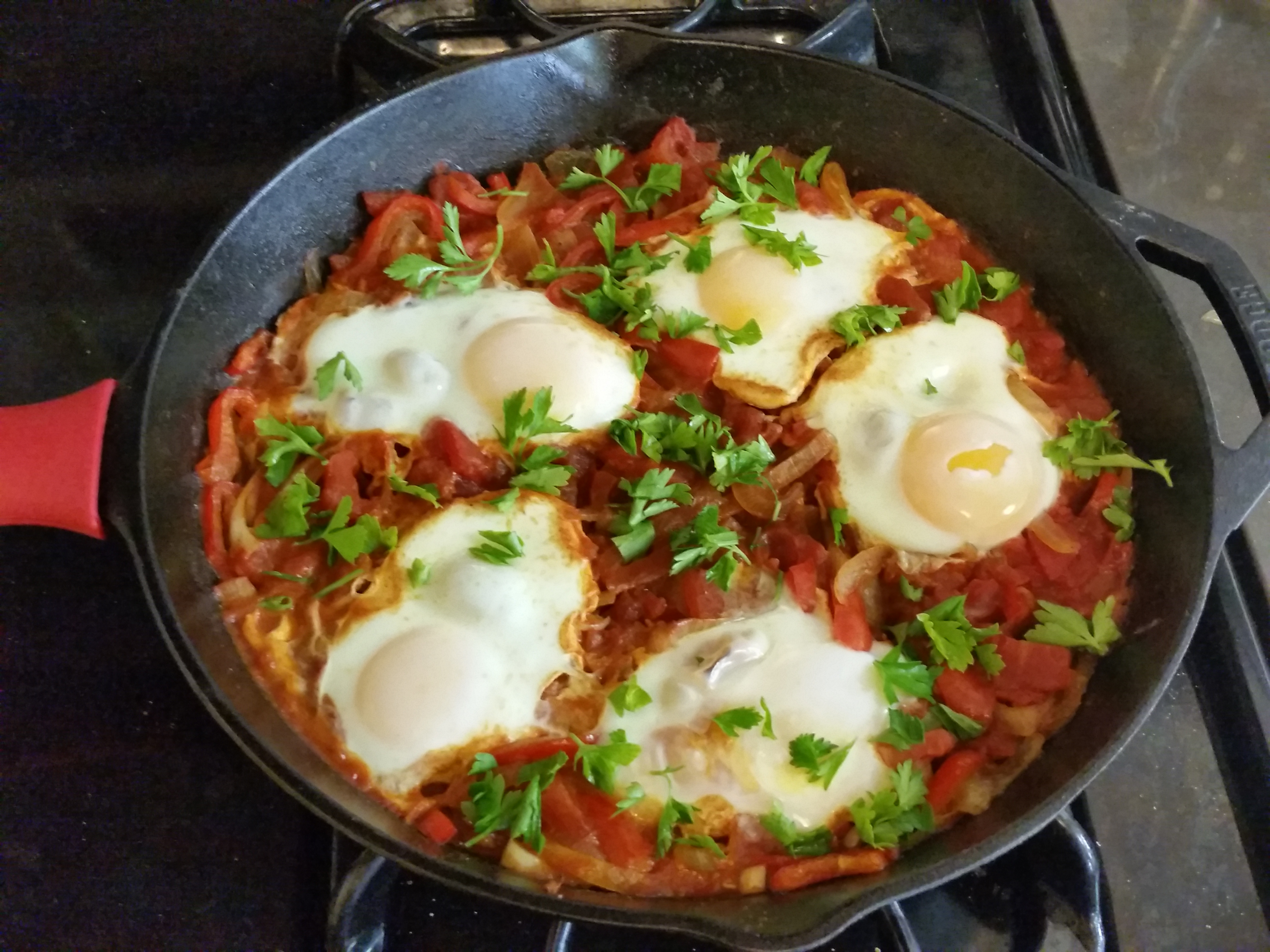
Shakshouka

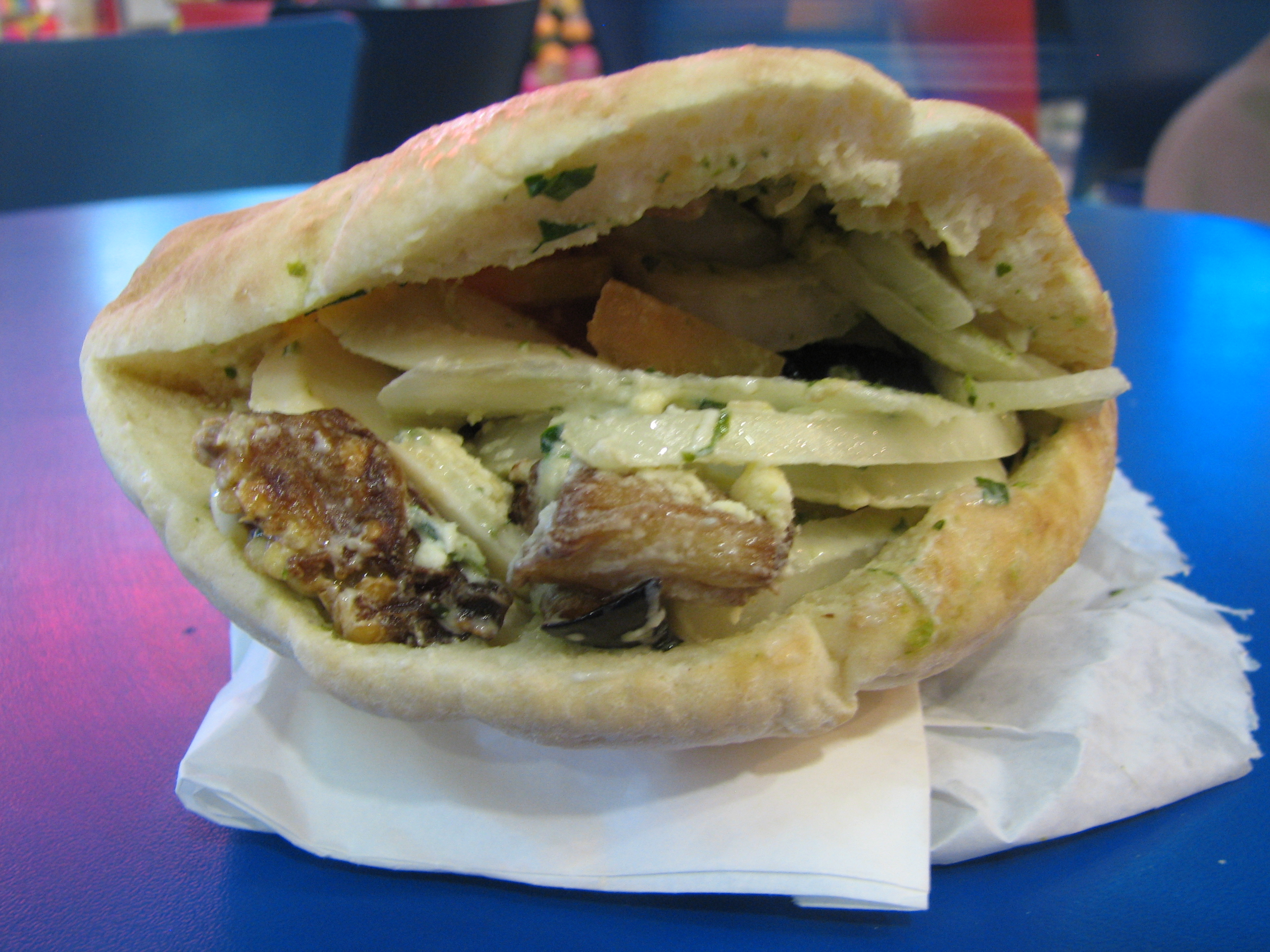
Sabich

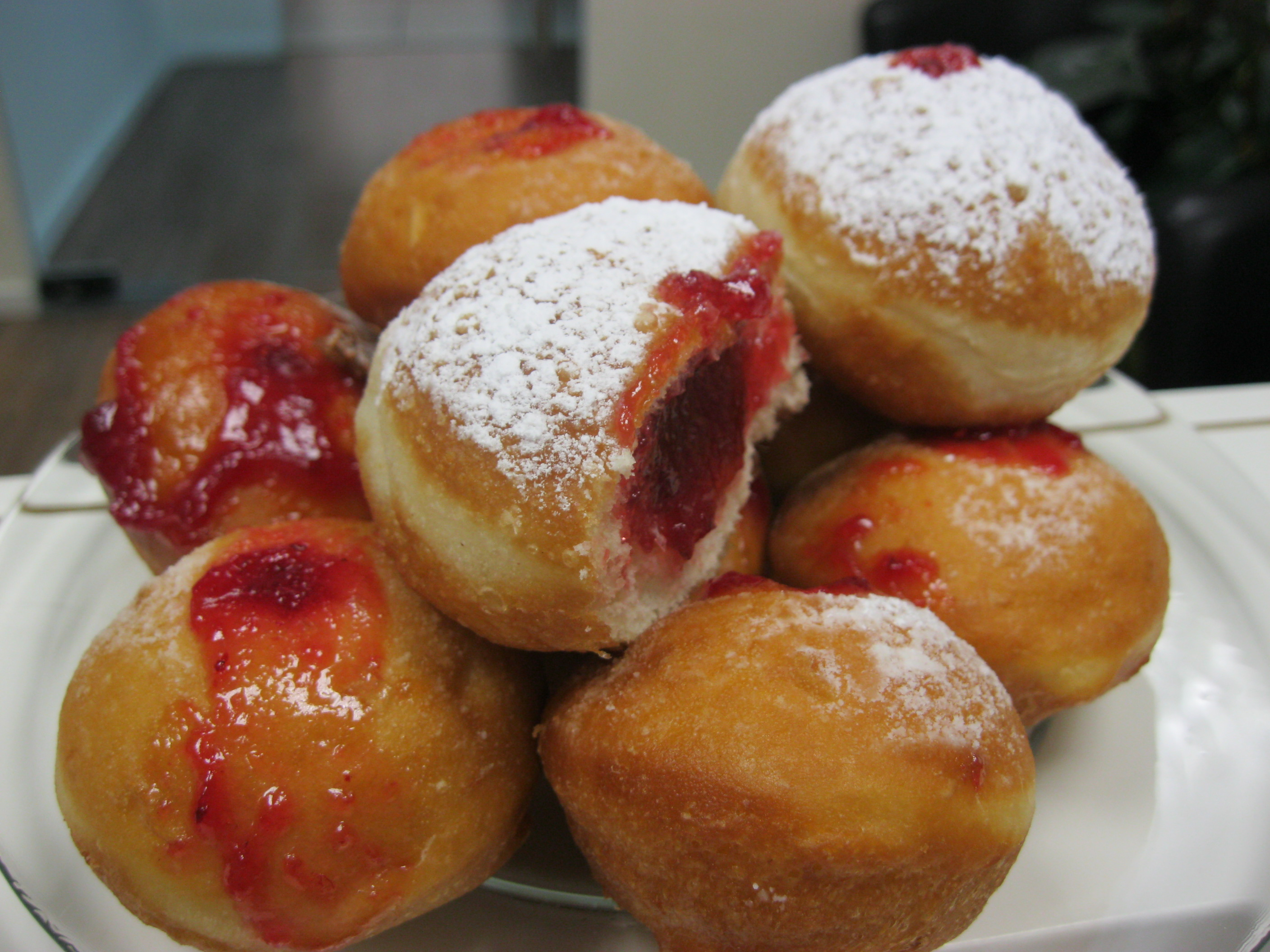
Sufganiyot

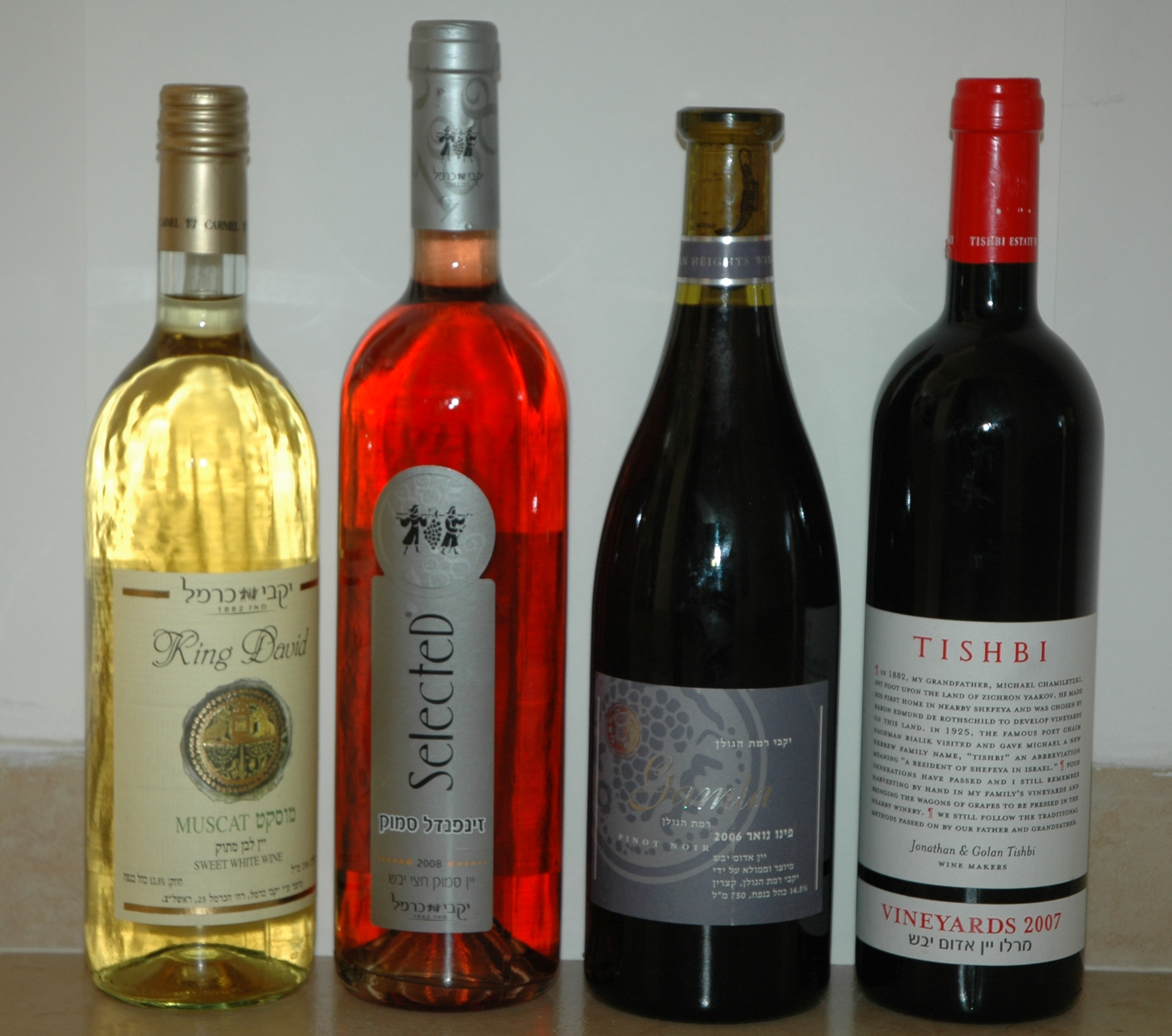
Israeli wine brands

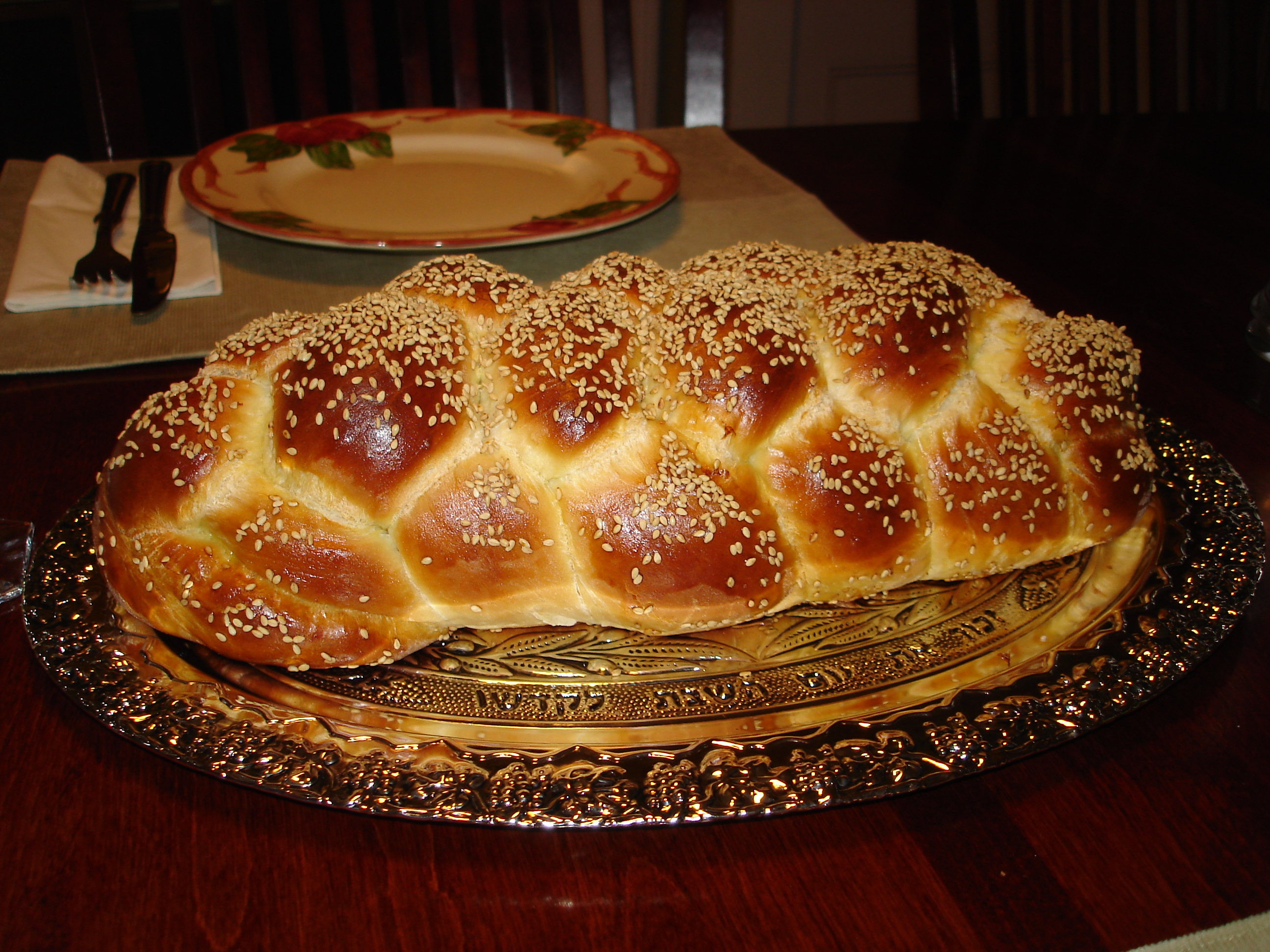
Challah

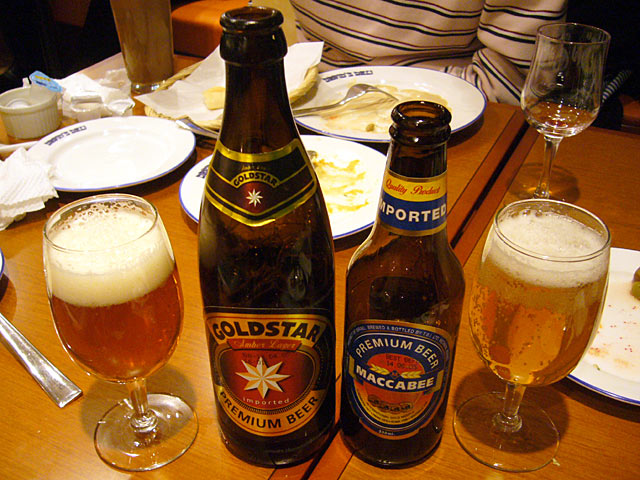
Israeli beer (Goldstar and Maccabee)

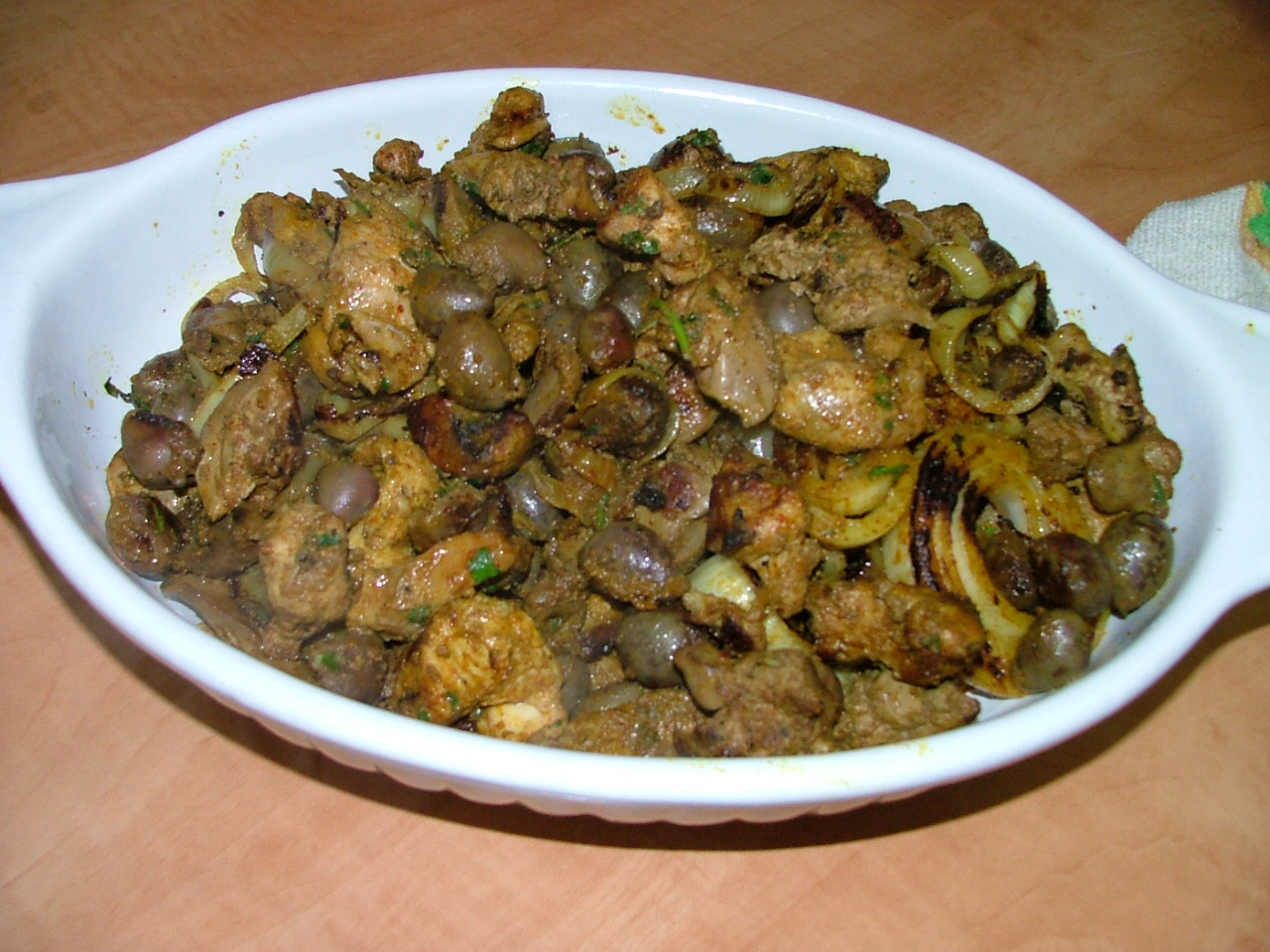
Meurav Yerushalmi

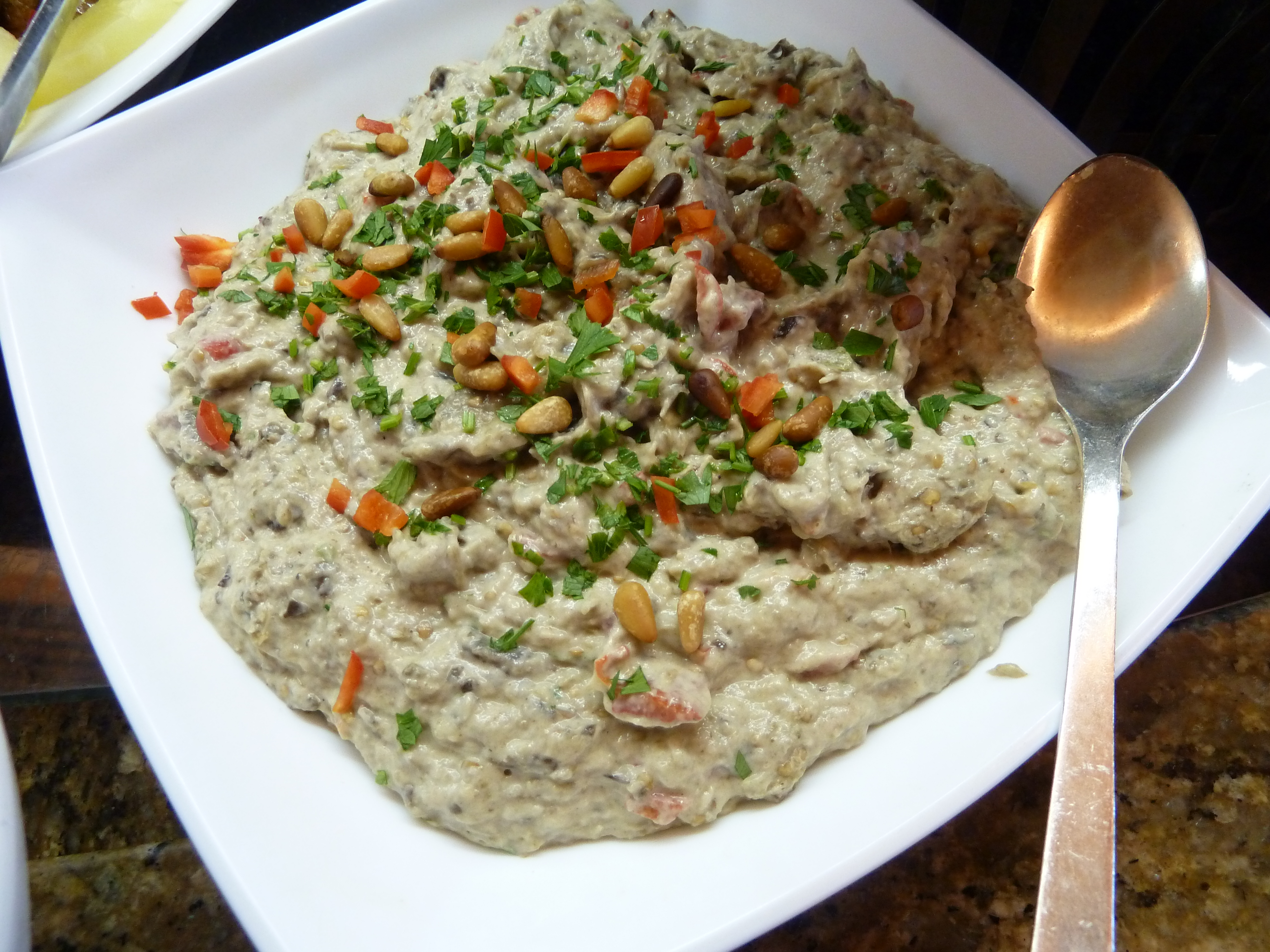
Israeli eggplant salad

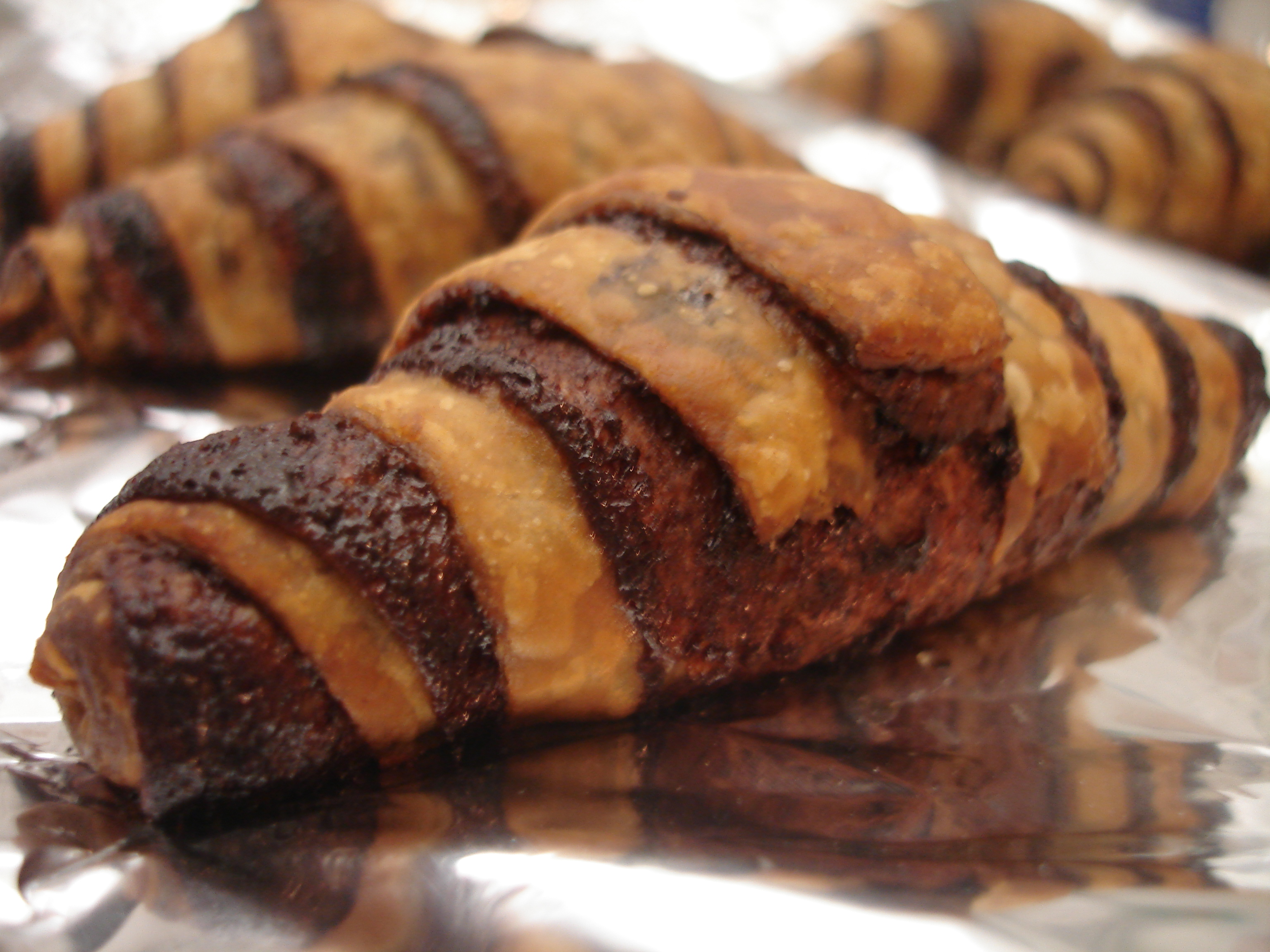
Rugelach

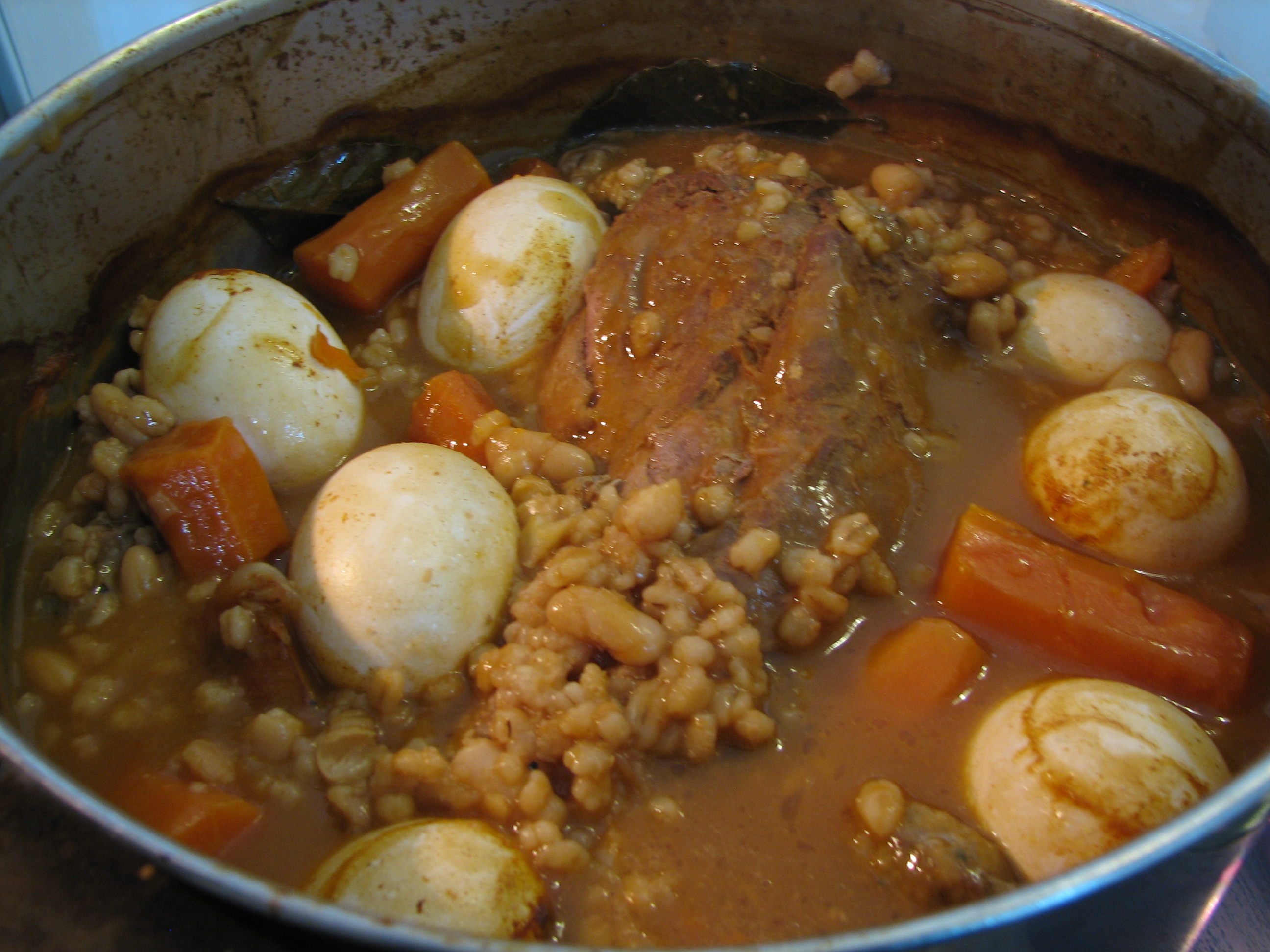
Hamin

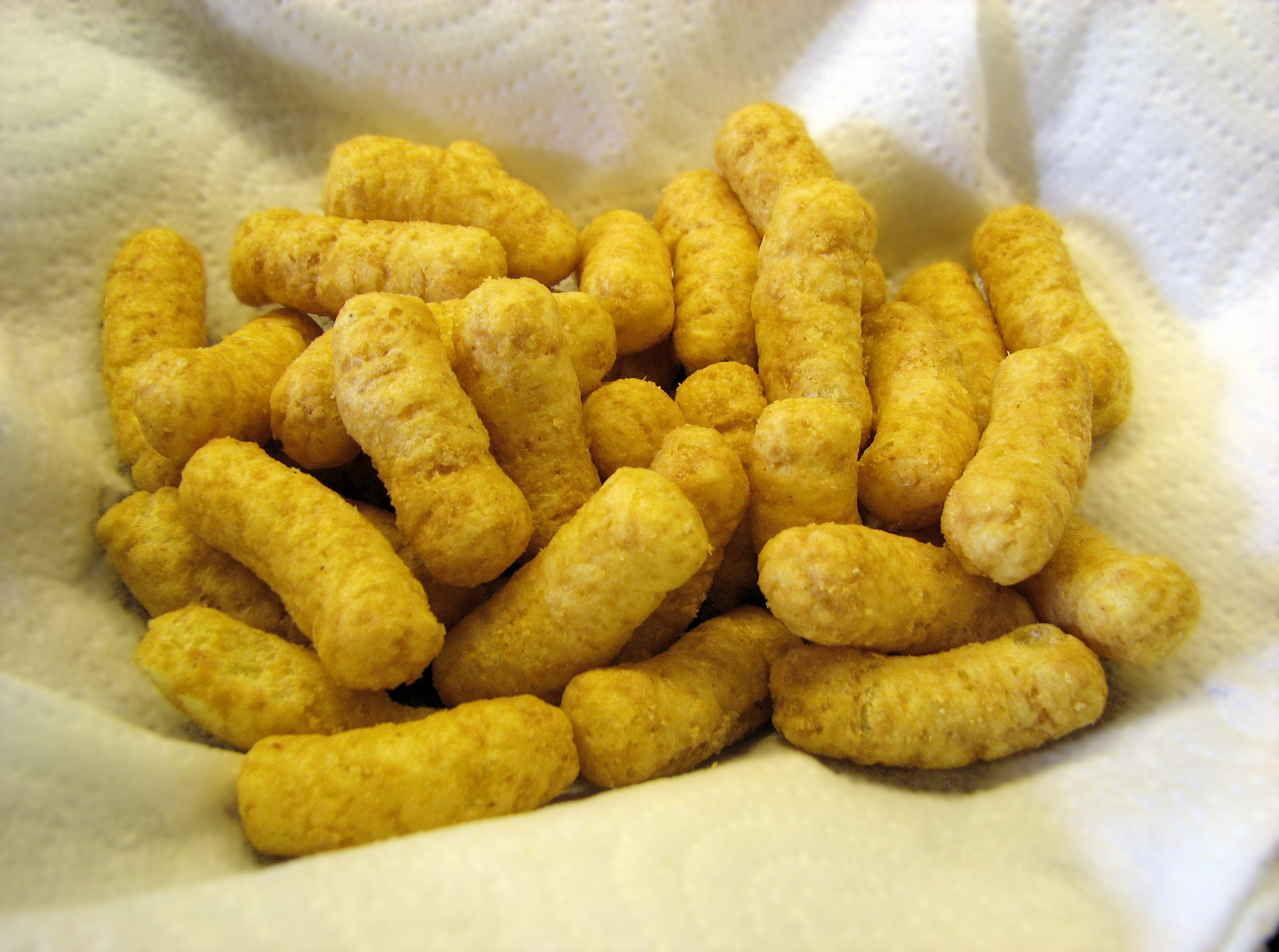
Bamba

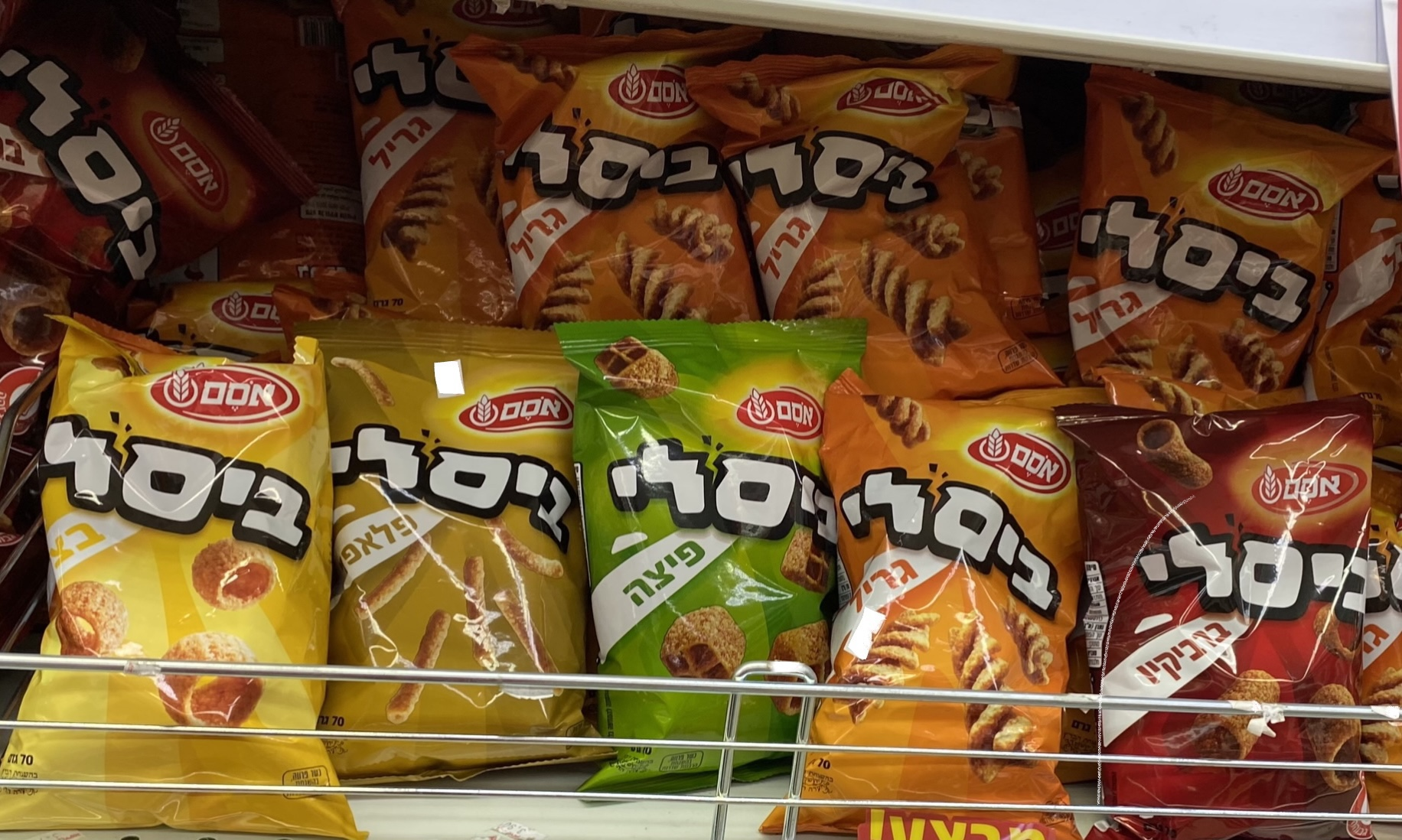
Bissli

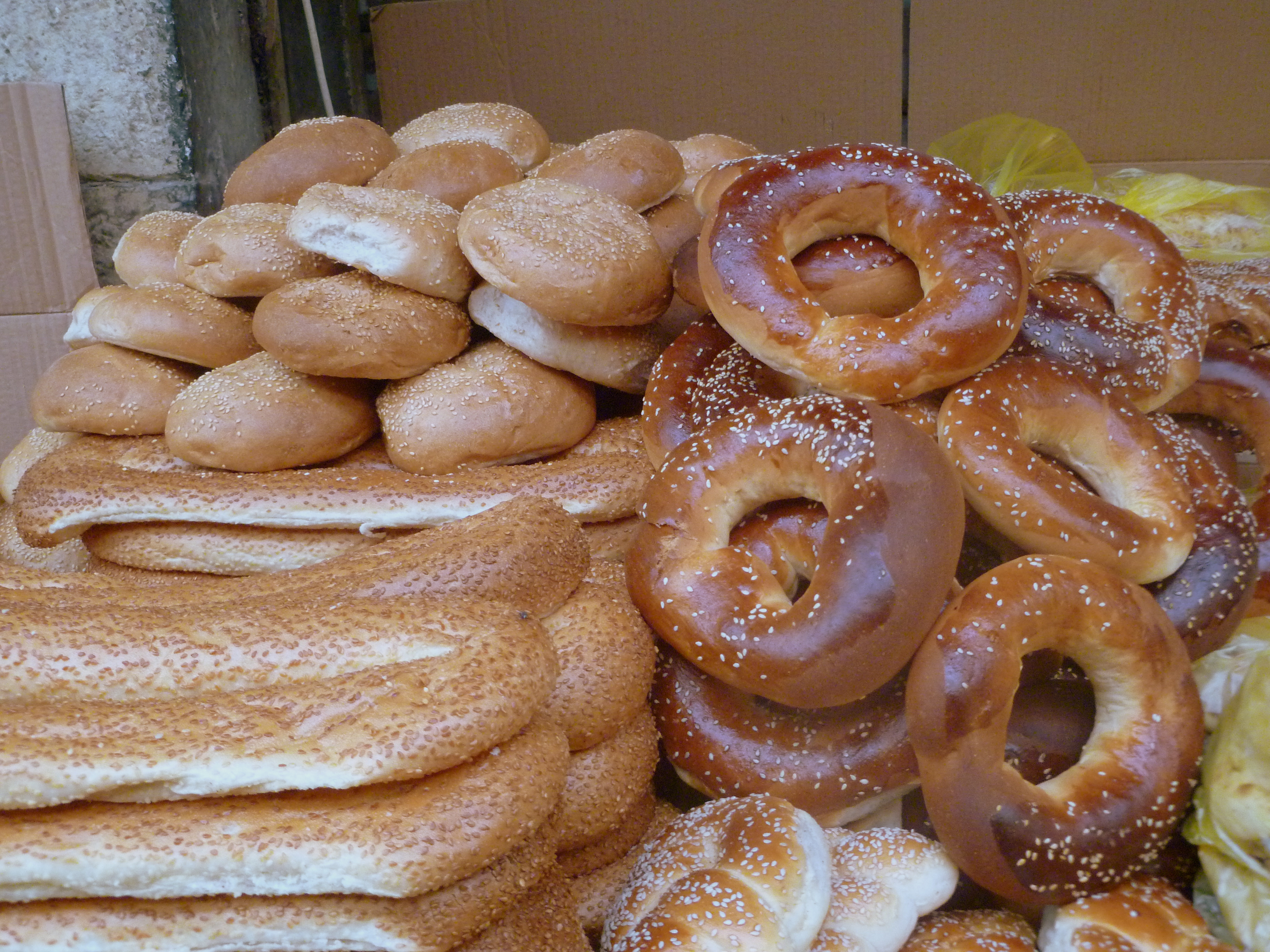
Breads in Mahane Yehuda market

== Fashion ==
Israel has become an international center of fashion and design. Tel Aviv has been called the “next hot destination” for fashion. Israeli designers, such as swimwear company Gottex, show their collections at leading fashion shows, including New York's Bryant Park fashion show. In 2011, Tel Aviv hosted its first Fashion Week since the 1980s, with Italian designer Roberto Cavalli as a guest of honor.

== Sports ==
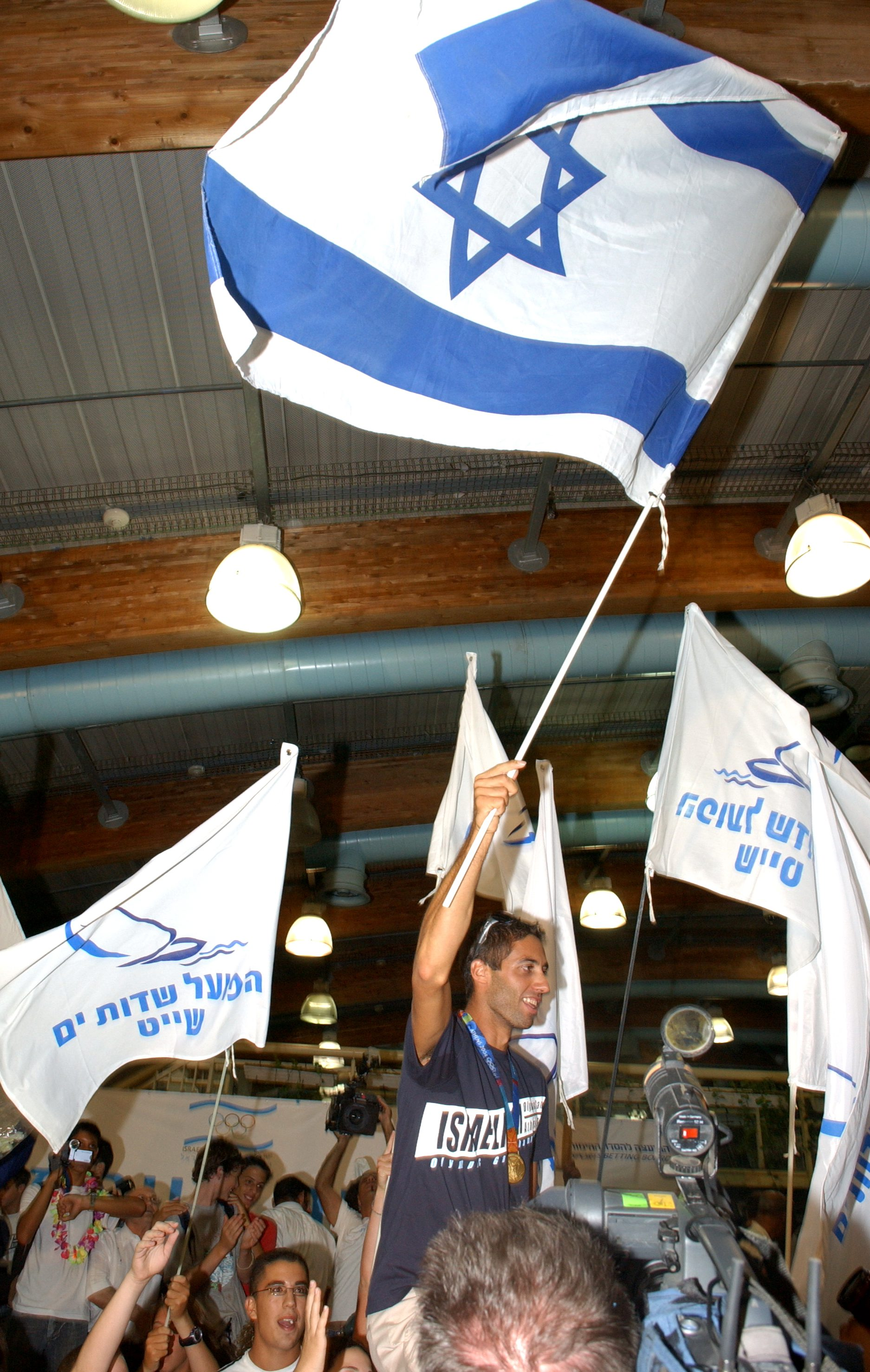
Gal Fridman, winner of Israel's first Olympic gold medal

Physical fitness received a boost in the 19th century from the physical culture campaign of Max Nordau. The Maccabiah Games, an Olympic-style event for Jewish athletes, was inaugurated in the 1930s, and has been held in Israel every four years since then.

In 1964, Israel hosted and won the AFC Asian Cup; in 1970, the Israel national football team managed to qualify to the FIFA World Cup, which is still considered the biggest achievement in Israeli football. Israel was excluded from the 1978 Asian Games due to Arab pressure, and since 1994 all Israeli sporting organizations now compete in Europe.

Football (soccer) and basketball are the most popular sports in Israel. The Israeli Premier League is the country's premier soccer league, and Ligat ha'Al is the premier basketball league. Maccabi Haifa, Maccabi Tel Aviv, Hapoel Tel Aviv and Beitar Jerusalem are the largest sports clubs. Maccabi Tel Aviv, Maccabi Haifa, and Hapoel Tel Aviv have competed in the UEFA Champions League, and Hapoel Tel Aviv reached the Quarterfinal in the UEFA Cup. Maccabi Tel Aviv B.C. has won the European Championship in basketball six times. Israeli tennis champion Shahar Pe'er peaked at 11th on the WTA rank list, a national record. Beersheba has become a national chess center; as a result of Soviet immigration, it is home to the largest number of chess grandmasters of any city in the world. The city hosted the World Team Chess Championship in 2005. Israeli chess teams won the silver medal at the 2008 Chess Olympiad and the bronze medal at the 2010 Chess Olympiad. Israeli Grandmaster Boris Gelfand won the Chess World Cup 2009, and played for the World Champion title in the World Chess Championship 2012.

To date, Israel has won seven Olympic medals since its first win in 1992, including a gold medal in windsurfing at the 2004 Summer Olympics. Israel has won over 100 gold medals in the Paralympic Games, and is ranked about 15th in the All-time Paralympic Games medal table. The 1968 Summer Paralympics were hosted by Israel.

== Youth movements ==
Youth movements were an important feature of Israel from its earliest days. In the 1950s, these movements were categorized in three groups: Zionist youth groups promoting social ideals and the importance of agricultural and communal settlement; working youth promoting educational goals and occupational advancement; and recreational groups with a strong emphasis on sports and leisure-time activities.

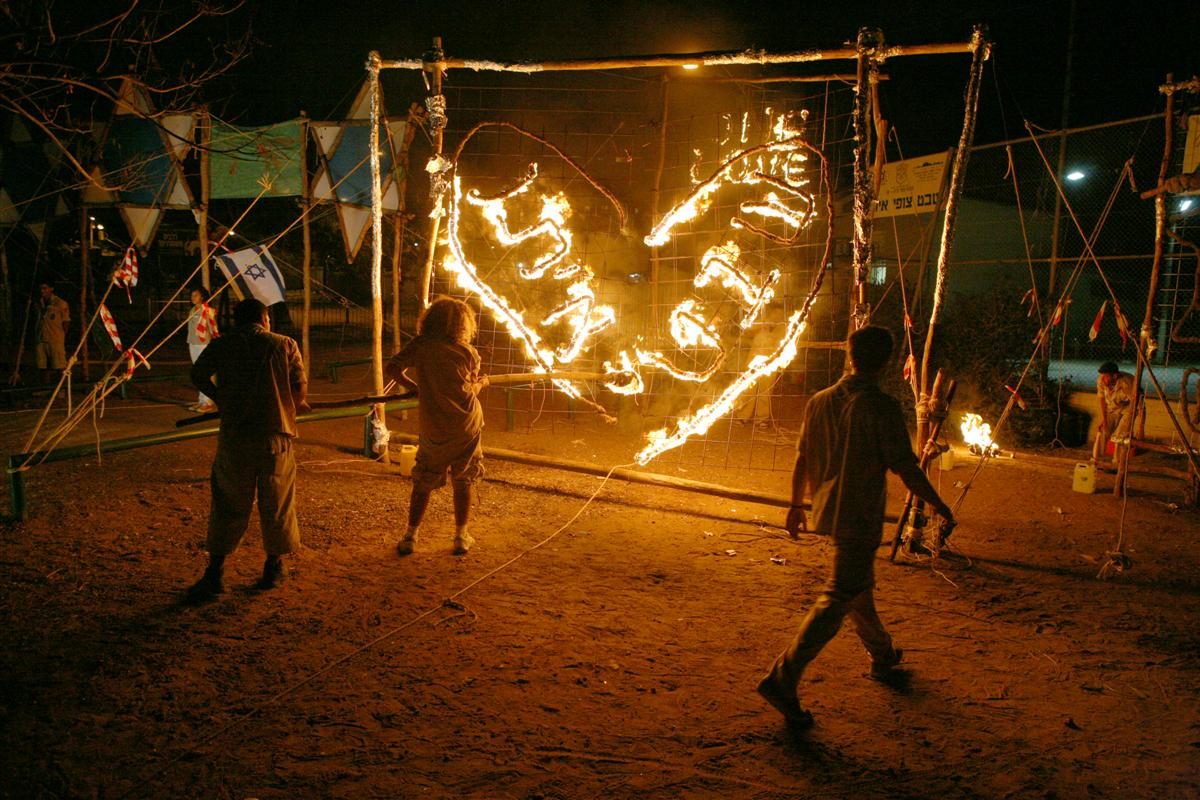
Tzofim Israeli scout movement fire ceremony in Tel Aviv

== Outdoor and vacation culture ==
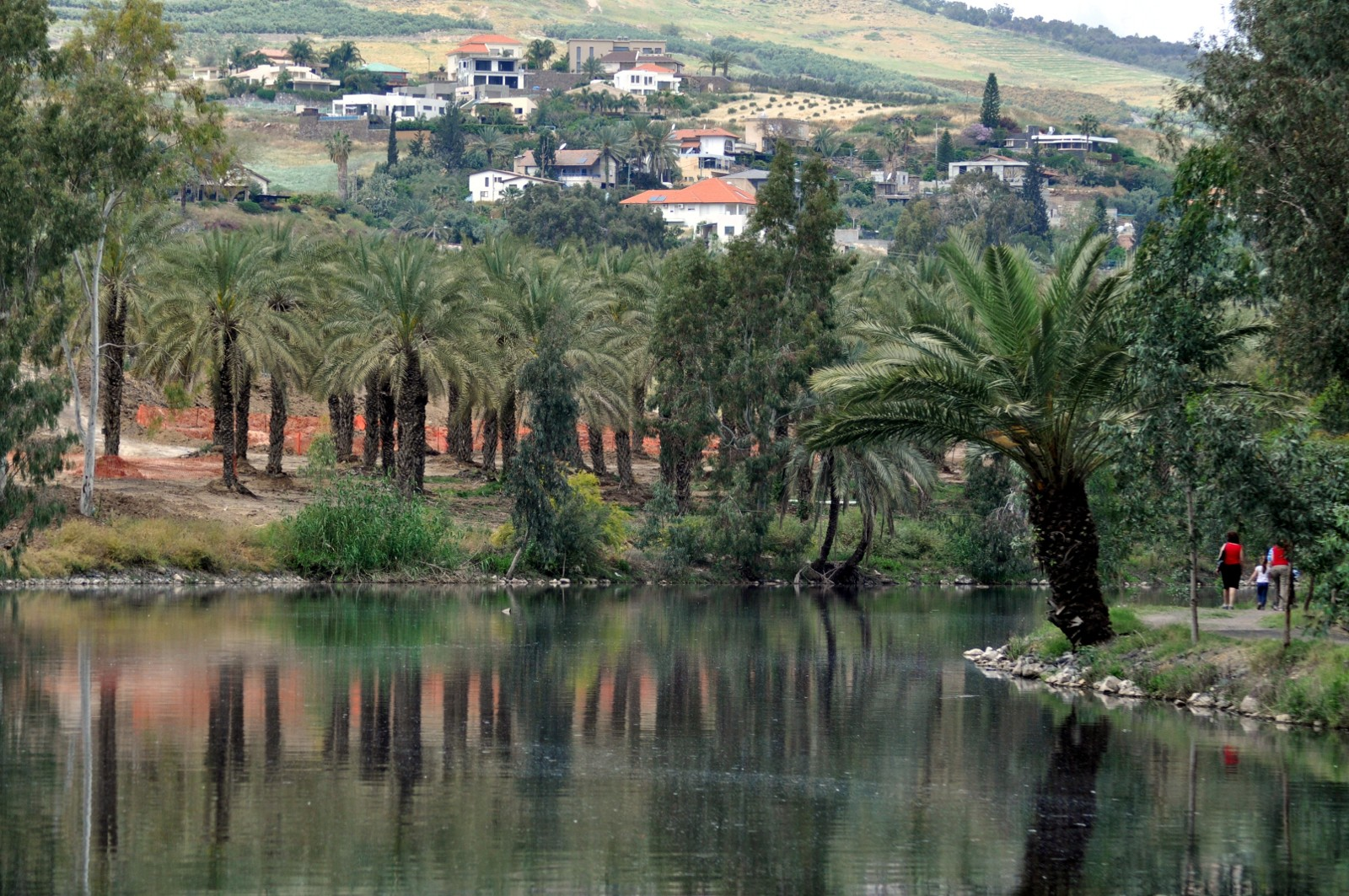
Hiking near Lake Kinneret

Hiking in Israel, named tiyul, has been an integral part of Israeli culture, representing the Sabra ethos. First practiced by Zionist pioneers as a way to bond to the Land of Israel, it had become charged with much cultural significance. Activities such as hiking during Jewish holidays (particularly Tu Bishvat) or backpacking on the Israel National trail, are part of israeli nationhood, culture, and history. National parks and nature reserves across Israel register some 6.5 million visits a year. Schools and youth groups are taken on annual hiking trips throughout the country, raising children with an affinity for hiking and other outdoor activities. Consequently, many young Israelis take several months to a year off to travel the world, primarily to hike and experience the outdoors in remote, mountainous areas, such as Nepal, India, China, Chile, and Peru.

Along the 190 kilometres (120 mi) of the Israeli Mediterranean coast, two thirds are accessible to bathing activities. Israel has 100 surf bathing beaches, guarded by professional lifeguards. Matkot is a popular paddle ball game similar to beach tennis, often referred to as the country's national sport.

== Wedding customs ==
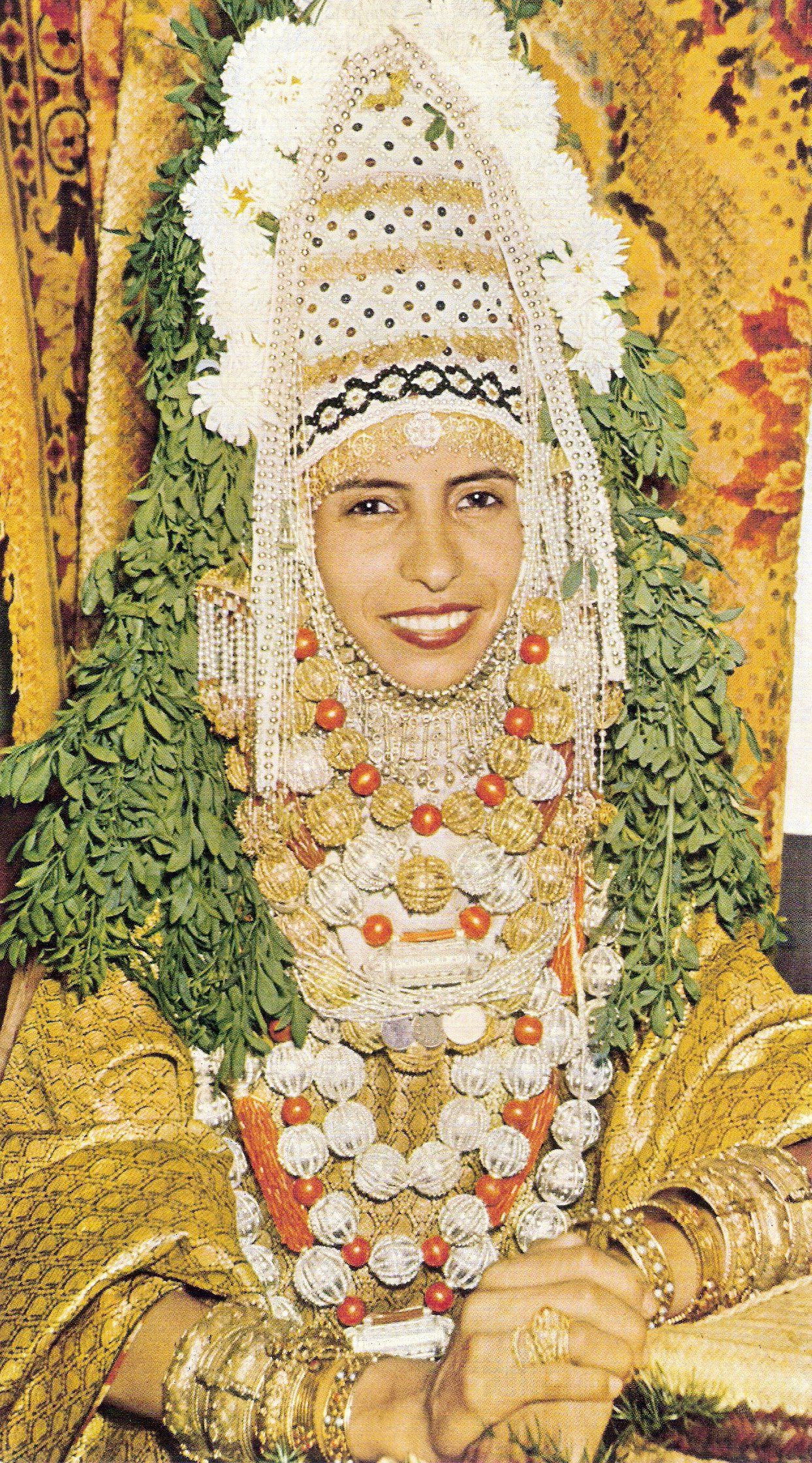
Jewish Yemenite bride in traditional bridal vestment, adorned with a henna wreath, 1958

All marriages between Jews in Israel are registered with the Chief Rabbinate, and the ceremony follows traditional Jewish practice. Civil ceremonies are not performed in Israel, although a growing number of secular couples circumvent this by traveling to nearby locations, such as Cyprus. While some Jews in Israel have adopted Western styles of dress, traditional clothing and jewelry are sometimes brought out for pre-wedding rituals, including the Night of the Henna, which is a customary practice among Mizrahi Jews.

== See also ==
- Birthright Israel
- Heritage tourism
- Israel Radio International
- Jerusalem March
- Jewish customs of etiquette
- Kol Yisrael
- List of Hebrew language authors
- List of Hebrew language playwrights
- List of Hebrew language poets
- List of Israeli actors
- List of Israeli musical artists
- List of Israeli visual artists
- Media of Israel
- Public holidays in Israel
- Religion in Israel
- Science and technology in Israel
- Start-up Nation
