= Mortal Love (novel) =

Mortal Love is a Novel by Rivka Keren, written in Hebrew (אהבה אנושה Ahava Anusha, Am Oved, HaSifria La'am Series, 1992) translated to English by Yael Politis, “Mortal Love” YWO, 2008, and to German by Helene Seidler, "Liebe wie der Tot", forthcoming. In “Mortal Love”, Rivka Keren raises some basic, universal questions: to what extent do we shape our lives? What happens when we ignore our fundamental nature? Is there predestination?

== Plot and characters ==
“Mortal Love” traces the story of five central figures, the devastating impact of love on them and the ways in which their lives are intertwined. The plot is not linear, leaping back and forth in space and time between anticipation and memory, set in Jerusalem, Hungary and Greece. There are several perspectives and the characters are connected not by unbreakable cables but by translucent, easily frayed willowy threads. The chapters written in first and third person and connected by short "fragments" representing sessions of psychotherapy that illuminate the plot from different angles, in the style of "Rashomon".

Beno (Benjamin) Gottzeit, a self-righteous and domineering Holocaust survivor, is obsessed with rectifying past injustices, those that he suffered as well as those that he caused. His compulsive need to set things right wreaks havoc on his relationships with two women, his lover Margit Cimbalom and his daughter Edna. Margit, a talented but disturbed artist, is tormented by Beno’s inability to match the intensity of her devotion to him. Edna, unable to extricate herself from the powerful influence of her father, perches on the brink of self-destruction as she tries to reconcile her own yearnings with the expectations of those around her. The unexpected details of their lives unfold through streams of memory and confession, revealing a history as intricate and fragile as an origami bird. The struggle between intent and reality, hope and disappointment, expands to include more characters. Zohar, Edna’s husband is a history teacher-turned-land surveyor, orphaned at a young age and desperately searching for the love and security that he did not get as a child. Ilias, a Greek Orthodox monk, was raised in Greece, like Edna in Hungary, by a father with rigid and unreasonable expectations: it is his arrival in Jerusalem that unexpectedly shapes the destiny of all the others and brings the novel to its conclusion.

== Additional Sources ==
- Ruth Seif: Review of the novel "Mortal Love" by Rivka Keren. Jewish Book World, Winter Issue 2009, Page 33.
- “Beno”, a chapter from Rivka Keren’s novel “Mortal Love” (Ahava Anusha), Translated by Yael Politis, Jerusalem Post, 4.2.1993
- Jeff Green, “Lost Hungarian Soul”, Jerusalem Post Magazine, 4.2.1993
- Ronit Lentin, Israel and the daughters of the Shoah – Reoccupying the Territories of Silence, Berghahn Books, 2000
- Efraim Sicher, The Holocaust Novel (Genres in Context), Routledge, 2005
