= Orgad =

Orgad (Hebrew: אורגד) is a Hebrew-language surname.

- Aryeh Orgad (born 1939), Israeli television personality
- Ben-Zion Orgad (1926–2006), Israeli composer
- Dorit Orgad (born 1936), Israeli writer
- Liav Orgad, Israeli professor of law and government
- Yigal Cohen-Orgad (1937–2019), Israeli politician
