= Rivka Keren =

Israeli writer

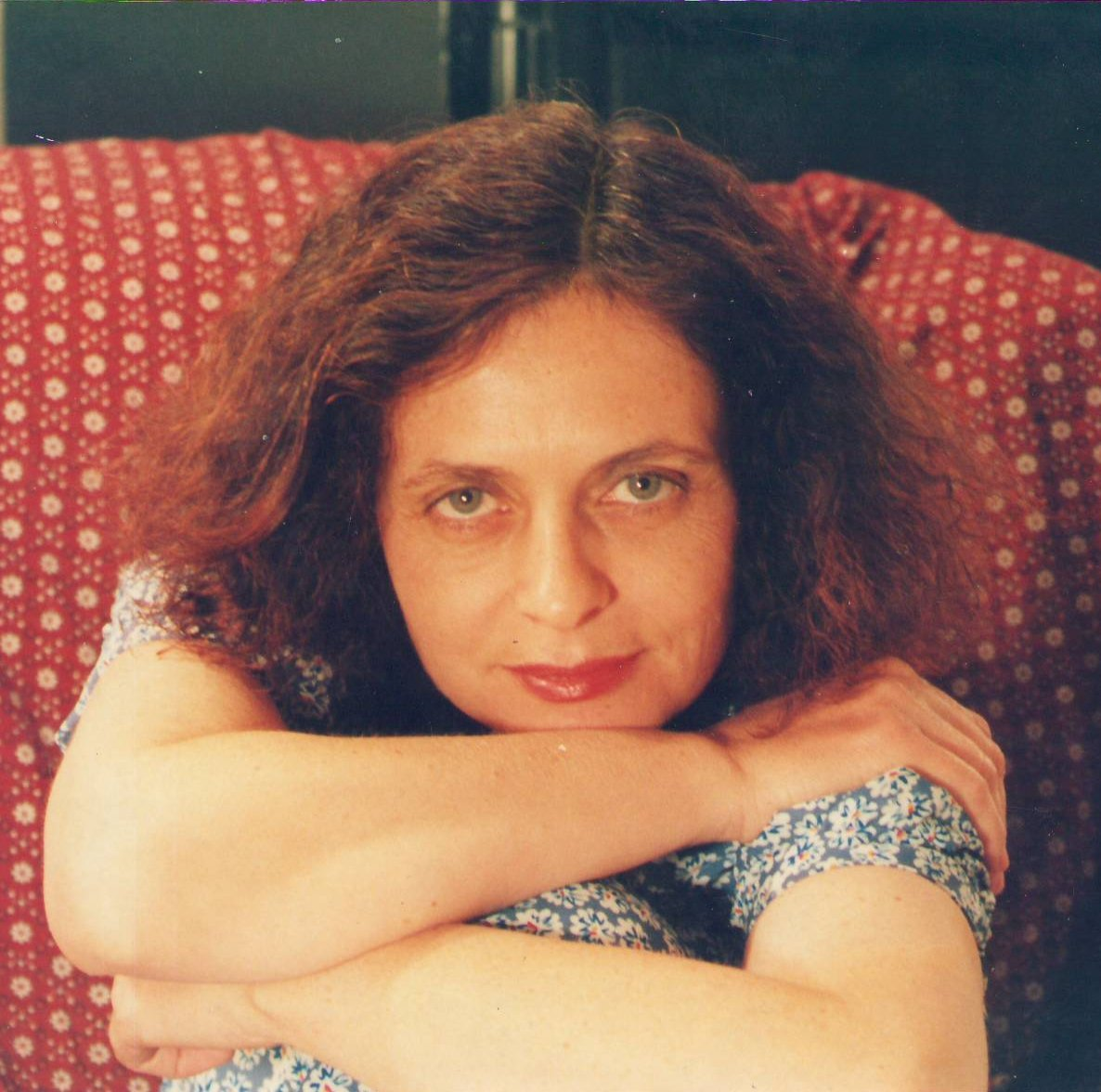
Keren in 2008

Rivka Keren (Hebrew: רבקה קרן; born 1946) is an Israeli writer.

== Biography ==
Rivka Keren was born as Katalin Friedländer in Debrecen, Hungary. She immigrated with her parents and small brother to Israel in 1957. She has been writing since childhood, first in Hungarian, later in Hebrew. Studied painting in Jerusalem and New York City, philosophy, literature and psychology in Bar Ilan University, graduated in Tel Aviv University (MA, clinical psychology).

Keren has worked as a librarian, art therapist and clinical psychologist. Exhibited her paintings in various countries. During these years, she had published books for children, adolescents, novels, short stories, translations and was included in numerous anthologies. Some of her books and short stories had been translated to German, English, Spanish, Russian, Hungarian, Braille (for the blind) and recorded on disks.

Keren is a member of PEN, ACUM, and IPA.

She is married with two children.

== Literary work ==
Rivka Keren published so far fourteen books and four additional books are due to be published soon. Her work is dealing mostly with subject matters such as destiny, memory, identity, the mystery of love and evil and the dualism of immigrants. Keren's writing is multi-layered and non-linear. The characters wander in a limbo between good and bad, love and hate, sanity and madness, while their state of mind meticulously analyzed. Their quests for belonging, roots and most of all truth and purpose, carry them to their goals through suffering and harsh experiences. Those of the novels that examine the characters against the black hole of the Holocaust were bestsellers and subject to much controversy among critics. In her writings, Rivka Keren, as second generation to Holocaust survivors, is representing the ongoing turmoil and conflict in the existence of immigrants, their pain and alienation but also their absorption and success. Her novels are a study of the human nature, the destructiveness of evil and revenge and the power of hope and love.

== List of books ==
- Outrage, novel, Agam Publishing House, Hanamal series, 2010. (in Hebrew)
- Mortal Love, 2008 (in English)
- Tita and the Satan (Tita ve ha Satan) – novel, Hakibutz Hameuchad, Hasifria Hachadasha Series, Tel Aviv, 1995
- Anatomy of a Revenge (Anatomia shel Nekama) – novel, Am Oved, Sifria Laam Series, Tel Aviv, 1993
- Mortal Love (Ahava Anusha) – novel, Am Oved, Sifria Laam Series, Tel Aviv, 1992
- The Taste of Honey (Ta'am ha Dvash) – novel, Am Oved, Sifria Laam Series, Tel Aviv, 1990
- Sad Summer, Happy Summer (Kaitz Atzuv, Kaitz Meushar) – novel for adolescents, Shoken, Tel Aviv, 1986
- The Story of the Patriarchs (Sipurey ha Avot) – 4 books and audio cassettes for young children, Masada, Tel Aviv, 1982
- Nufar, the Story of a Seagull (Nufar, Sipura shel Schafit Yam) –children's book, Masada, 1981
- The Journey of the Dwarfs Tik and Tak (Hamasa shel Tik ve Tak) – small children's book, Masada, 1980
- Wild Lili (Lili Ha Prua) – diary in letters for adolescents, illustrated by the author, Sifriat Poalim, Tel Aviv, 1978
- Kati, a Young Girl's Diary (Kati, Yomana shel Neara) – biographical novel for adolescents, Am Oved, Tel Aviv, 1973
- Ruthi Shmuti (Ruti Shmuti) – novel + short stories for adolescents, Masada, Tel Aviv, 1970

== Translated books ==
- Katalin – Ungarisches Tagebuch, Deutsch von Mirjam Pressler, Verlag St. Gabriel, Mödling-Wien, 1996 (Hardcover)
- Katalin, Beltz Verlag, Gulliver Taschenbuch 391, Weinheim und Basel, 1999 (Paperback)
- Bittersüßer Sommer, aus dem Hebräischen von Mirjam Pressler, Gabriel Verlag GmbH, Wien, 1999 (Hardcover)
- Bittersüßer Sommer, Beltz Verlag, Gulliver Taschenbuch 859, Weinheim und Basel, 2001 (Paperback)
- Anatomie einer Rache, aus dem Hebräischen von Helene Seidler, Bleicher Verlag GmbH, Gerlingen, 2001 (Hardcover)
- Der Geschmack von Honig, aus dem Hebräischen von Helene Seidler, Haland&Wirth im Psychosozial-Verlag, Gießen, 2004 (Hardcover)
- Liebe wie der Tod, aus dem Hebräischen von Helene Seidler (Planned to be published)
- Mortal Love, translated from Hebrew by Yael Politis, YWO, UK, 2009

== Some of the translated stories ==
- Rivka Keren, "Aisha", translated from the Hebrew by Maayan Keren, Anthology "Pain and Memory", Editions Bibliotekos Inc., November 2009
- Rivka Keren, "Kiribiri", translated from the Hebrew by Maayan Keren, Anthology "Pain and Memory", Editions Bibliotekos Inc., November 2009
- Rivka Keren, "Islamorada", translated from the Hebrew by Dalit Shmueli, Anthology "Common Boundary", Editions Bibliotekos Inc., June 2010
- Rivka Keren, They Set Sail in the Springtime", excerpt from the novel "Mortal Love", translated from the Hebrew by Yael Politis, Anthology "Common Boundary", Editions Bibliotekos Inc., June 2010
- Rivka Keren "1939", poem translated from the Hebrew by Yael Politis & "Farewell", painting by Rivka Keren, Autumnskypoetry, October 2009, Issue 15.
- Rivka Keren, "Zipora", excerpt from the novel "Mortal Love", translated from the Hebrew by Yael Politis, Anthology "Puzzles of Faith and Patterns of Doubt", Editions Bibliotekos Inc., January 2013

== Literary awards ==
- 2000 – The Austrian Government Honorable Award for Youth & Children Literature, Austria
- 1995 – Kugel Prize for literature awarded by the Municipality of Holon, Israel
- 1986 – Zeev Award for Children Literature, Israel
- 1976 – Ramat-Gan Award for Literature, Israel
- 1975 – Lamdan Prize for Children and Youth Literature, Israel
- 1974 – Nordau Award for Literature, Israel
- 1972 – Keren Hayesod Award for Literature, Israel
- 1970 – Honorable Mention of the jury of the Yatziv Literary Award, Israel

== Additional sources ==
- Ruth Seif: Review of the novel "Mortal Love" by Rivka Keren. Jewish Book World, Winter Issue 2009, Page 33.
- Helene Conrady, Bilder von Rebecca Keren, "Feine Damen im Olivenhain", NRZ, Zeitung für Düsseldorf, 21 März, 1985
- Jeff Green, "Lost Hungarian Soul", Jerusalem Post Magazine, 4.2.1993
- Jeff Green, "Anatomy of a Revenge", Jerusalem Post, 29.10.1994
- Jeff Green "Tita and the Satan", Jerusalem Post, 22.12.1995
- Hillel Halkin, "The Taste of Honey", The Jerusalem Report Weekly, 6.12.1990
- Philip Harrigan/Jean Etsinger, "Book beat", about St Thomas author and artist from Israel, Rivka Keren, The Daily News, St * Thomas, USVI, November 18, 1987
- Phillip Harrigan, "Sense of Mystery and wistfulness lie in Pictures from Jerusalem", about the art exhibition of Israeli artist Rivka Keren, The Daily News, November 22, 1986
- Ronit Lentin, Israel and the daughters of the Shoah – Reoccupying the Territories of Silence, Berghahn Books, 2000
- Efraim Sicher, The Holocaust Novel (Genres in Context), Routledge, 2005
- "Childhood memories behind Rivka's novel", Jewish Telegraph, Arts and entertainment, Friday, March 13, 2009, page 32

== See also ==
- Mortal Love (novel)
