= Pinchas Sadeh =

Polish-born Israeli novelist and poet

- פנחס שדה
- Born: Pinchas Feldman; 1929; Lemberg, Poland
- Died: 29 January 1994 (64 years old); Jerusalem, Israel
- Occupations: Novelist and poet
- Writing career
- Notable awards: The 1990 Bialik Prize for Literature

Pinchas Sadeh, also Pinhas Sadeh, (Hebrew: פנחס שדה; born in Lemberg, Poland 1929; died 29 January 1994 in Jerusalem, Israel) was a Polish-born Israeli novelist and poet.

== Biography ==
Pinhas Feldman (later Sadeh) was born in Galicia (then part of Poland). His family immigrated to Mandatory Palestine in 1934, settling in Tel Aviv. He lived and studied in Kibbutz Sarid. In 1947 he moved to Jerusalem and published poems and essays in various periodicals. With the outbreak of the War of Independence, he was drafted into the IDF and served as a sergeant commanding a combat unit. His first poetry collection, A Burden Resembling, was published in 1951 by Sifriat Poalim. For about two years (1952–1954), he lived and worked in the kibbutzim Kinneret and Yifat (in the latter, he worked as a teacher). He returned to Jerusalem, got married, later divorced (1955), and then wrote the autobiographical-philosophical novel Life as a Parable (1958)

Later, he studied in England. Sadeh worked as a shepherd at Kvutzat Kinneret. There he met Yael Sacks, whom he married in 1956 but the marriage lasted only three months. In 1962–1969, he was married to Yehudit. He began publishing his work in 1945.

Sadeh died in Jerusalem at the age of 64.

== Literary career ==
Sadeh's literary output consisted of six collections of verse, two novels, a novella, four books of essays, a children's book and a collection of Hassidic folktales. Sadeh's work addressed elementary existential issues. He spoke of his writing as "theological" and a "moral act." His first poem translated into English, "Proverbs of the Virgins," appeared in Commentary magazine in August 1950. His collections of poetry included Burden of Dumah. His novels included One Man's Condition and Death of Avimelech. He also wrote an autobiographical account of his early life (up to age 27), Life as a Parable. Life as a Parable became his most celebrated work. According to one literary critic, it "expressed a 'yearning for religiosity' in a country that sanctified secularism."

The drive to exist 'differently'—which was both the impetus and the goal of his creative work—served as a formative force that shaped a correspondence between its formal and thematic values. This impulse consistently propelled him forward, and with it, his expression remained faithful to the same tonalities and messages, consciously disregarding contemporary trends—except for minor formal refinements. Indeed, both 'otherness' and 'irrationality' were the preferred expressions of that same formative force, which rendered his body of work a unified whole, with its parts maintaining a kind of internal coherence despite their profound contradictions.

Sadeh's poetic logic, there never was—nor could there ever be—any true purpose to life within the civil, simplistic, material reality, which inevitably leads to the nullification of existence—to death. A person of spirit, however, must, in an act of courageous protest, find a true meaning for life and a true love for life. Only the search for 'the other reality'—alluded to in sleep and in the vision of a noble, symbolic death—might offer an alternative morality, and even a new way of self-perception, religious at its core: a perception of 'the human condition' before the absolute Other—God.

Sade also wrote comic books, which he signed with a pseudonym. He was the author of most of the comics published in Haaretz Shelanu, a children's magazine, using the name "Yariv Amazya." Many of his comics were science-fiction based.

== Awards and recognition ==
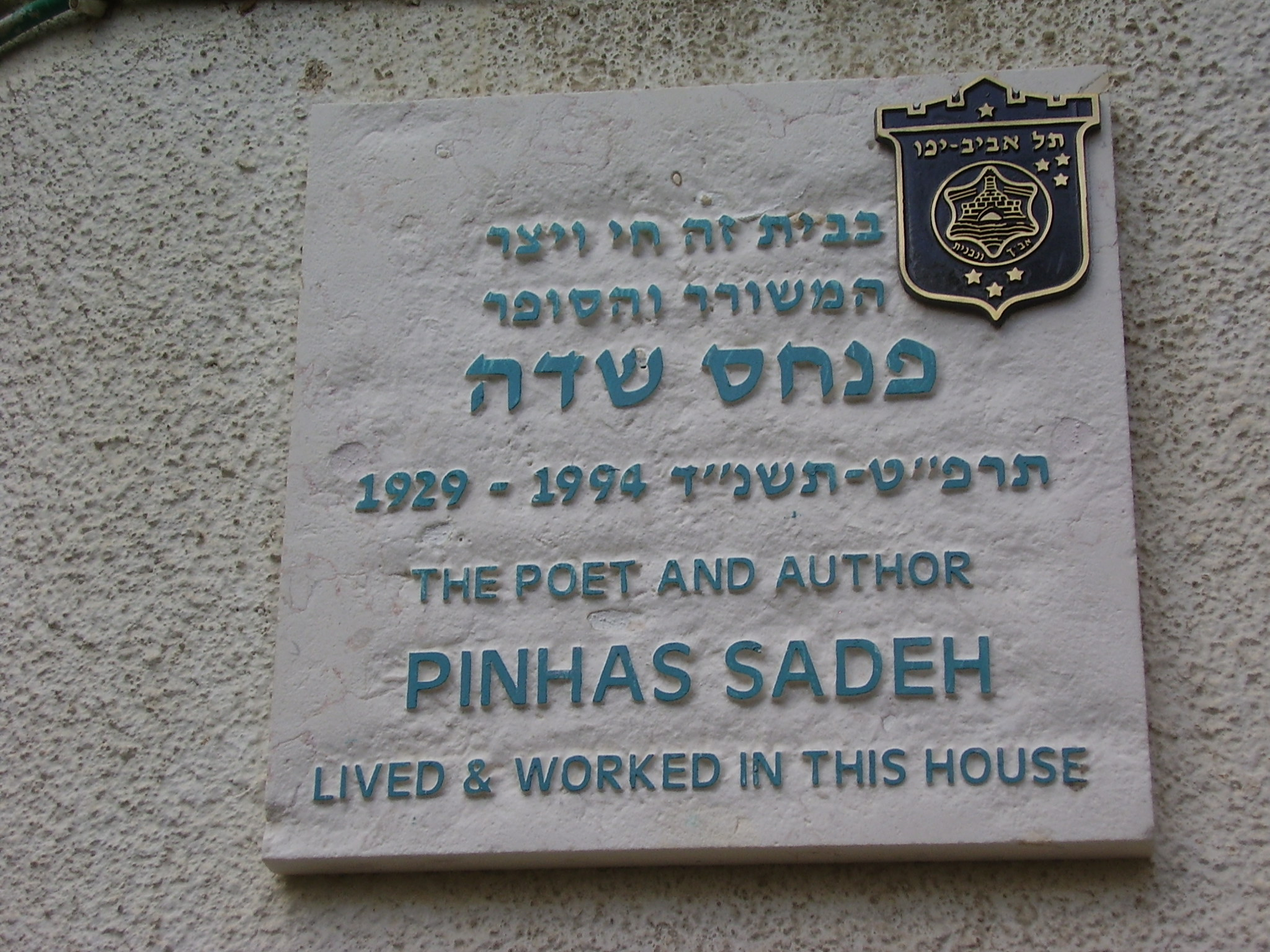
Memorial plaque for Pinchas Sadeh

Sadeh won the 1990 Bialik Prize for Literature, jointly with T. Carmi and Natan Yonatan. He was a 1973 recipient of the Prime Minister's Prize for Hebrew Literary Works.

== See also ==
- Hebrew literature
- Israeli literature
