= Dorit Orgad =

Israeli writer

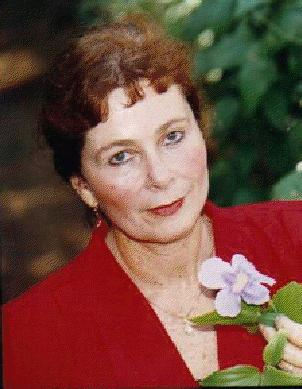
Dorit Orgad (2013)

Dorit Orgad (Hebrew: דורית אורגד; born October 5, 1936) is an Israeli writer. She writes children's and young adult fiction, as well as books for adults. She also taught at academic institutions.

== Biography ==
When she was 3, her family immigrated to Eretz Israel and settled in Netanya.

She graduated from the departments of economics and sociology at the Hebrew University of Jerusalem and of Jewish philosophy at Bar-Ilan University (Ph.D.).

== Books ==
Orgad published 3 books for adults and 70 children's and young adult books.

- 1979, 1993: Testing Time (בשעת מבחן) (for ages 12–16)
  Hamid, a medical student at Tel Aviv University, an Arab, rents a room from an old lady Miriam Rosen, who insists on calling him Haim. It turns out that she takes him for her son. Miriam's daughters accuse him of deception...
  Translations: German, Spanish, Japanese, Korean
- 1984 (original Hebrew: הנער מסיביליה), 2006 (English): The Boy from Seville (translated by Sondra Silverston, for ages 10–13)
  Set in the early 17th century Spain, it is a novel about 12-year-old boy Manuel Nunez and his Sephardic Jewish family of Marranos, Jews who were converted to Christianity, but continued to practice Judaism and for what they were persecuted by the Inquisition in Spain and Portugal.
  The book was also translated into Russian, German, Spanish, French, Italian, and Serbian
- 2006: Kalkidan (Note: Kalkidan (Amharic: ቃልኪዳን) is an Amharic language name) (for ages 9–14)
  - The story of a 14-year-old boy from a family who came to Petah Tikva from Ethiopia The boy manages to deal with his life despite the racism he meets due to his black skin. For the unflattering portrayal of the Israeli society the novel was met with both criticism and praise.
- 2017: השתיקה של יורי (Yuri Breaks His Silence, for ages 10–17)
  A 12-year-old boy Ilyusha (Ilish) while living in Moscow meets a strange silent boy Yuri. When Yuri is injured by a fall from a tree, Ilish's grandmother takes case of Yuri, and Ilish and Yuri become friends, but Yuri remains silent. After Ilish and family move to Israel, Ilish meets a boy named Uri who looks remarkably similar to Yuri...

== Awards ==
Her awards include:

- Lamdan Prize (1981)
- Ashman Prize for Short Children's Stories (1982)
- Haifa University's Adrian Tomas Prize (1984)
- Ze'ev Prize for children's and young adult literature (1987)
- Bernstein Prize from Haifa University's Education Department (1987)
- Hadassah & Haifa Foundation Prize (2000)
- Honor Citation from the WZO for lifetime achievement and for her books about children from Ethiopia (2004)
- Yad Vashem Award (2005 ?)
- Verghereto Award (Italy, 2006) for the best children's book of the year for the English edition of The Boy from Seville
- Ministry of Culture Award (2007) for Kalkidan, which was also selected Most Popular young adult Novel by Israel's Ministry of Education
- Public Libraries Award (2012) for Kalkidan
- Dvora Omer Award for book Yuri Breaks his Silence (2017)
- Lifetime Achievement Award (2018)
