= Uriel Ofek =

Israeli children's writer, editor, and lyricist

Uriel Ofek (Hebrew: אוריאל אופק; 30 June 1926 in Tel Aviv – 23 January 1987) was an Israeli children's writer, editor, lyricist, poet, translator and literary scholar.

== Biography ==
Ofek was born in Tel Aviv to the Yiddish poet Arie Popik, grew up in Giv'atayim and studied in Herzliya Hebrew Gymnasium. He served as a medic in the Palmach Brigades, 1944–1949, 1947–1949 Palestine war and served in Gush Etzion and was in Jordanian captivity, where he spent about nine months.

He edited the children's newspaper Davar L'iladim (children's supplement of Davar) for many years and laid the foundation for the Bibliography of Jewish children's literature, Hebrew and Yiddish, the global children's literature, both knees of children's literature.

He had a doctorate degree in children's literature from the University of Toronto.

Many of his books are based on experiences in childhood and youth in neighborhood Borochov in Giv'atayim, where he grew up. He describes landscapes, events and characters from the period preceding the establishment of Israel – the Slick of Aldema, Battles in Wadi Musrara, and the Seven Mills along the Yarkon river.

His widow, Bina Ofek, and two daughters, Atara Ofek and Amira Hachamowitz, are writers and editors for children as well.

Ofek died from leukemia in 1987 at the age of 61.

== Awards ==
- In 1965, Ofek was awarded the Lamdan Prize for children's literature and youth for his book "Robinson to Lubengulu".
- In 1976, he won the Zeev Prize for literature for children and youth for his book "No secrets in the neighborhood".

== Books (partial list) ==
=== Books for children and youth ===
- "The Show Must Go On" (translated to English, German, Danish and Dutch)
- "Smoke Over Golan" (translated to English, German, Danish, Dutch and Afrikaans)
- "Five minutes of fear"
- "Stars on the border"
- "Story Time"
- "No secrets in the neighborhood"
- "Seven mills and a station"
- "Steps in the sand"
- "Deer Hill"
- "My Great Raid"

=== Classic Jewish Legends ===
- "Chelm the City of Wise Men"
- "King Solomon's bee" (originally by Haim Nahman Bialik)
- "Emperor's New Clothes"
- "Fishing the Goldfish"

==== reference books ====
- "Lexicon Ofek to Children's Literature"
- "A hundred years of Zionism"
- "Robinson to Lubengulu"
- "Snow white to Emil"
- "Tarzan and Hasamba"
- "Give them books"

=== Translations ===
- Tom Sawyer by Mark Twain (1969)
- Tree stars by Leib Morgntoi (1977)
- Mister God, This Is Anna by Fynn (1979)
- Translation of poems in The Lord of the Rings by J. R. R. Tolkien (1979)
- Max and Moritz by Wilhelm Busch (1983)
- The Wind in the Willows by Kenneth Grahame (1984)
- Wild Shua, a third translation of Struwwelpeter by Heinrich Hoffmann (1985)
- Wizard of Oz by Frank Baum (published after Ofek's death in 1988)
- Huckleberry Finn by Mark Twain
- Alice in Wonderland and Alice Through the Looking-Glass by Lewis Carroll
- Tales from Moominvalley and The Memoirs of Moominpappa by Tove Jansson
- Charlie and the Chocolate Factory by Roald Dahl
- James and the Giant Peach by Roald Dahl

=== Discography ===
Netanela and Dudu Zakai- Blue Bird – The Songs of Uriel Ofek −1977
