= Kfar Ma'as =

Moshav in central Israel

Kfar Ma'as: כְּפַר מַעַשׂ (Hebrew)
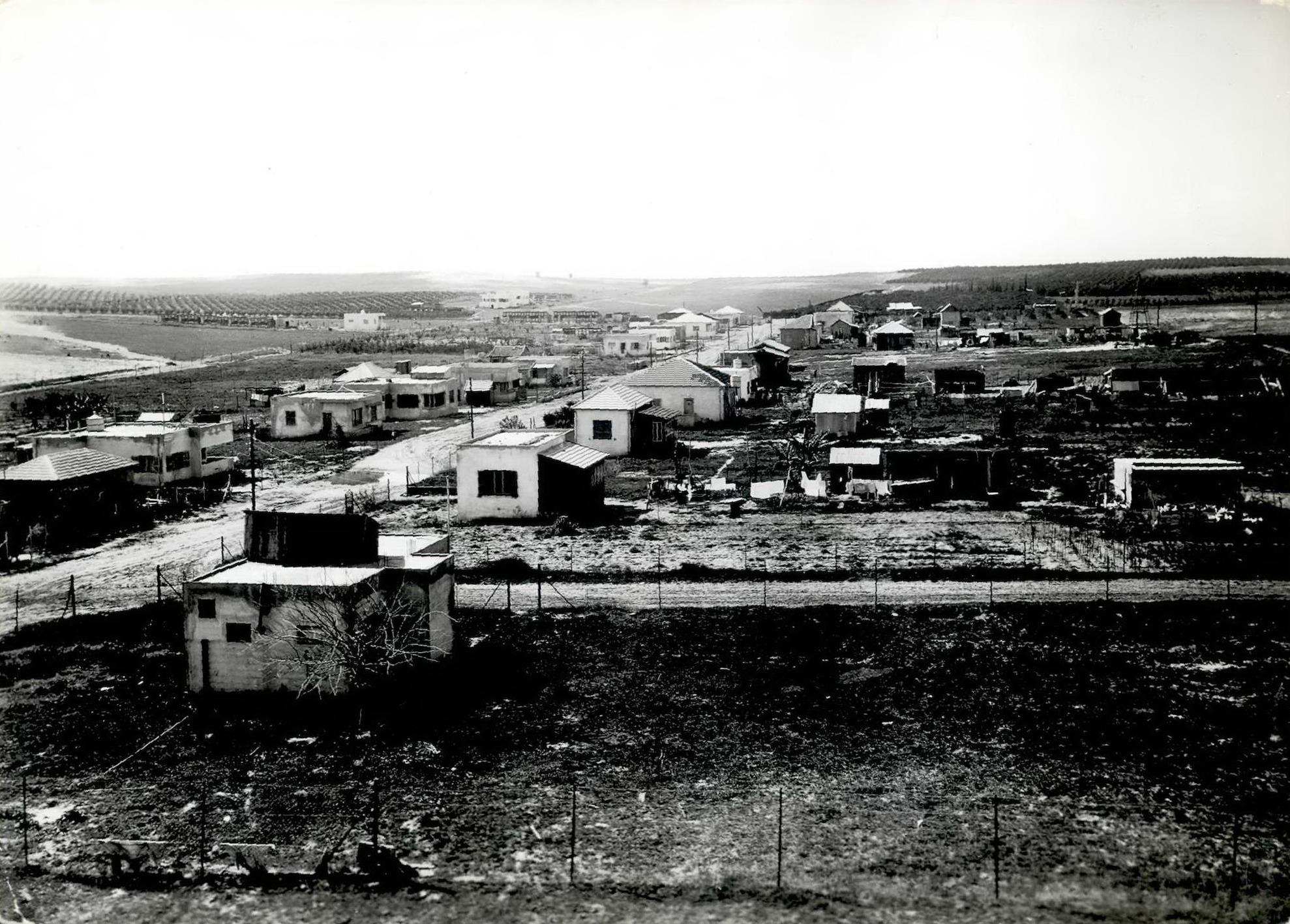
- Kfar Ma'as in 1938

- Location within Central Israel
- Coordinates: 32°3′49″N 34°53′25″E
- Country: Israel
- District: Central
- Subdistrict: Petah Tikva
- Council: Drom HaSharon
- Affiliation: Moshavim Movement
- Founded: 1934
- Population (2024): 875
- Website: www.kfar-maas.co.il

Kfar Ma'as (Hebrew: כְּפַר מַעַשׂ, lit. 'Deed Village') is a moshav in central Israel. Located to the south of Petah Tikva on the edge of the Ono Valley, it falls under the jurisdiction of Drom HaSharon Regional Council. In 2024 it had a population of 875.

== History ==
The moshav was formed in 1934 by the uniting of two villages, Behadraga and HaYovel.

== Notable people ==
- Natan Yonatan
- Dvora Omer

== Gallery ==
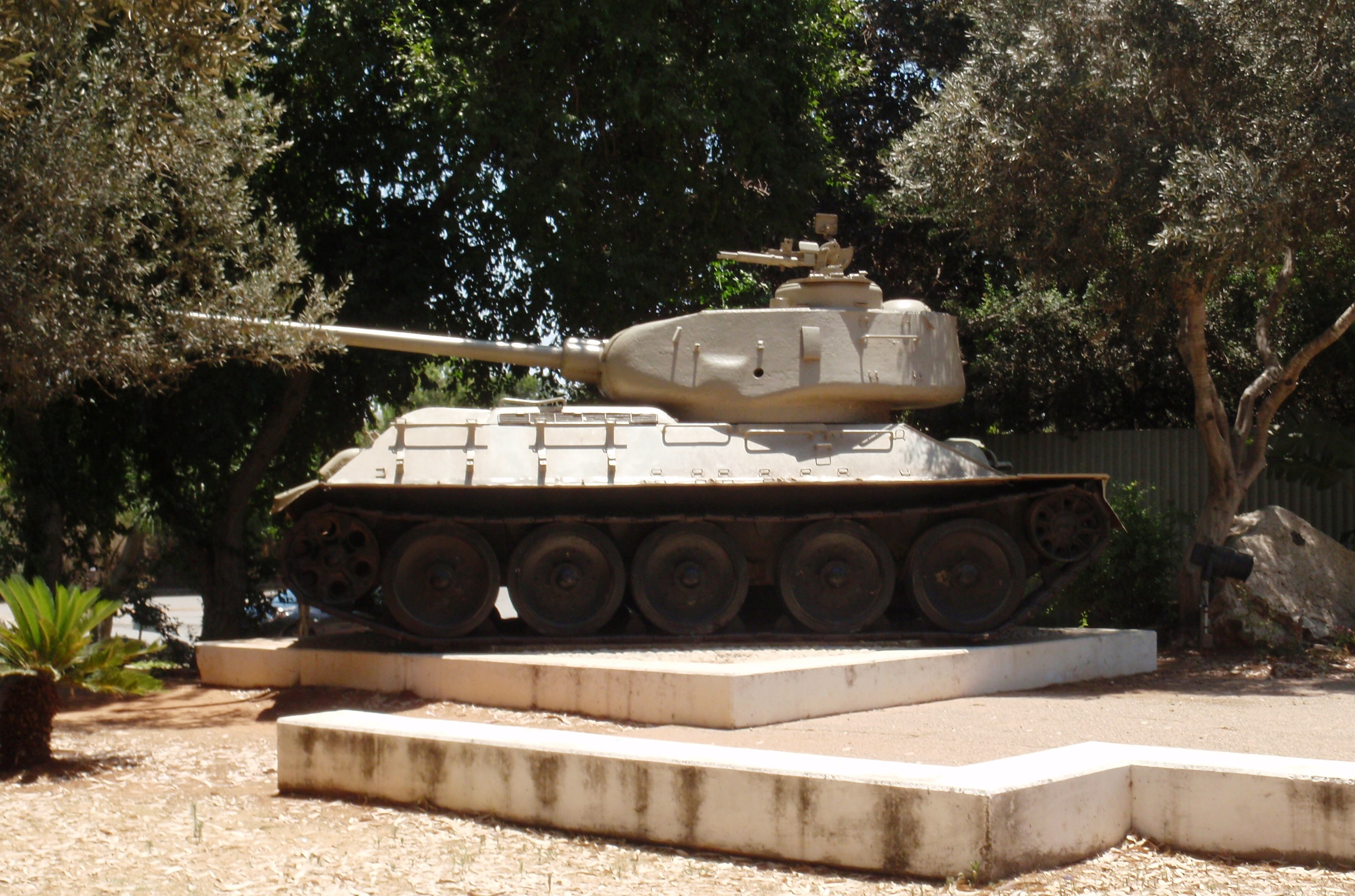

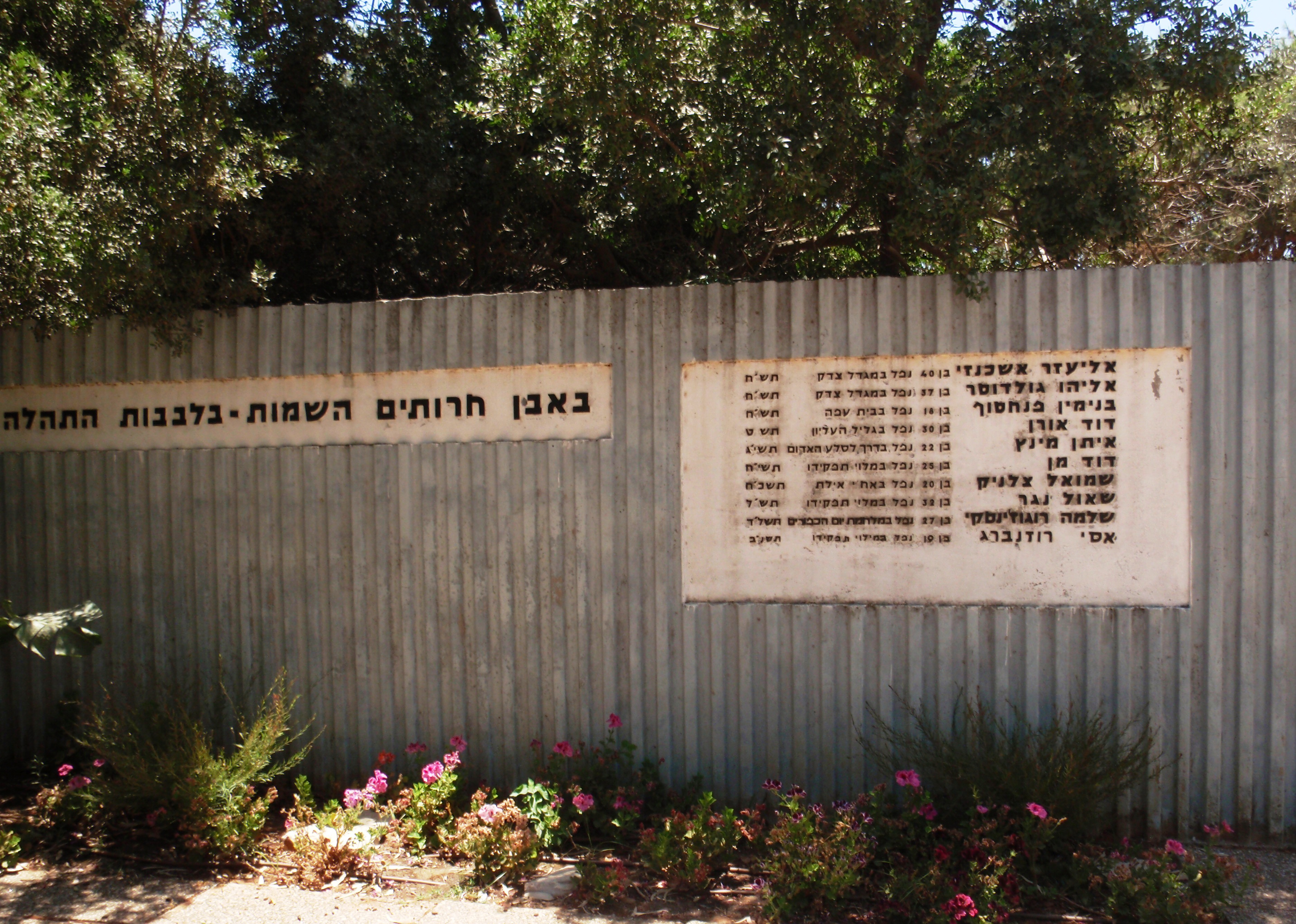

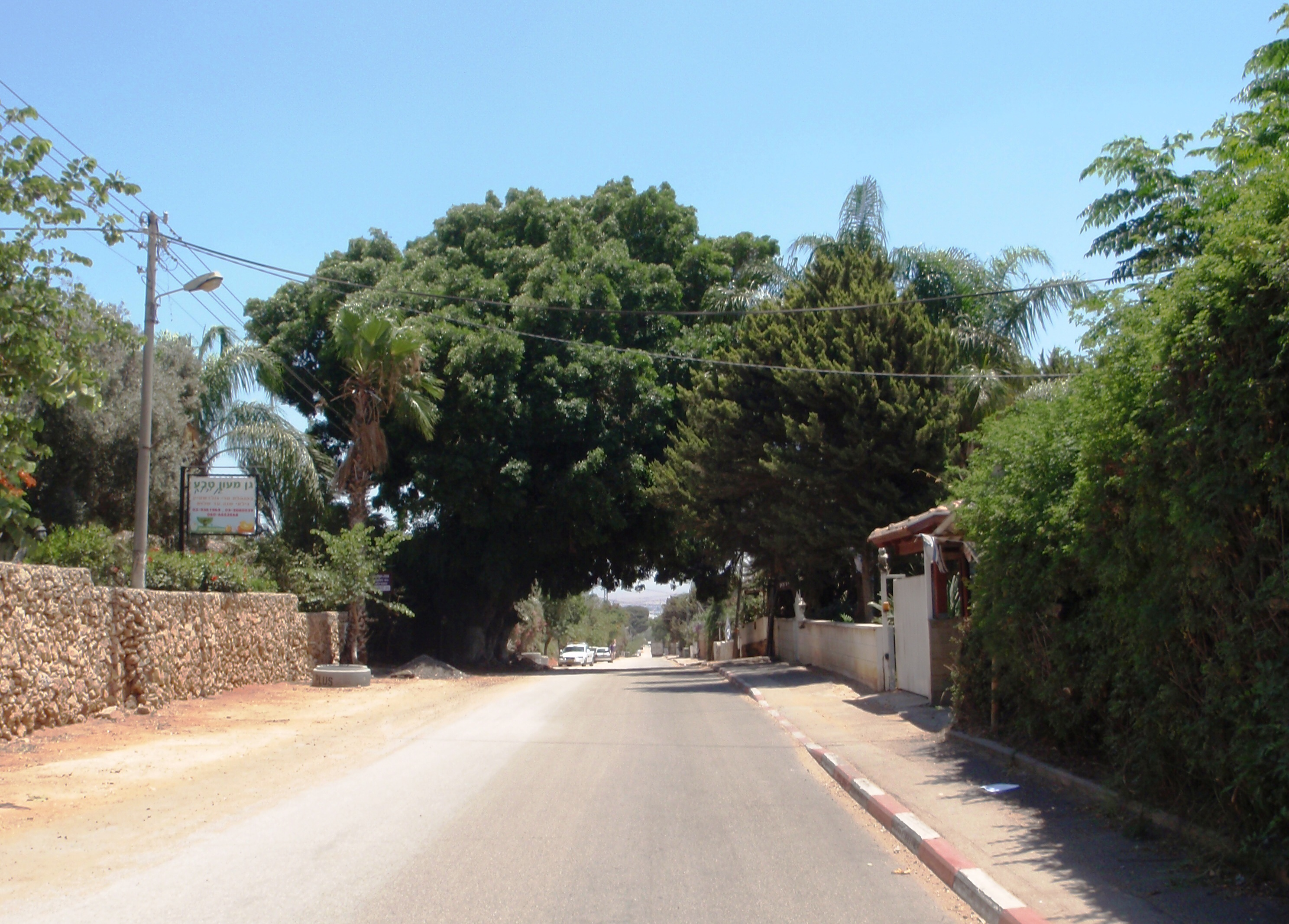

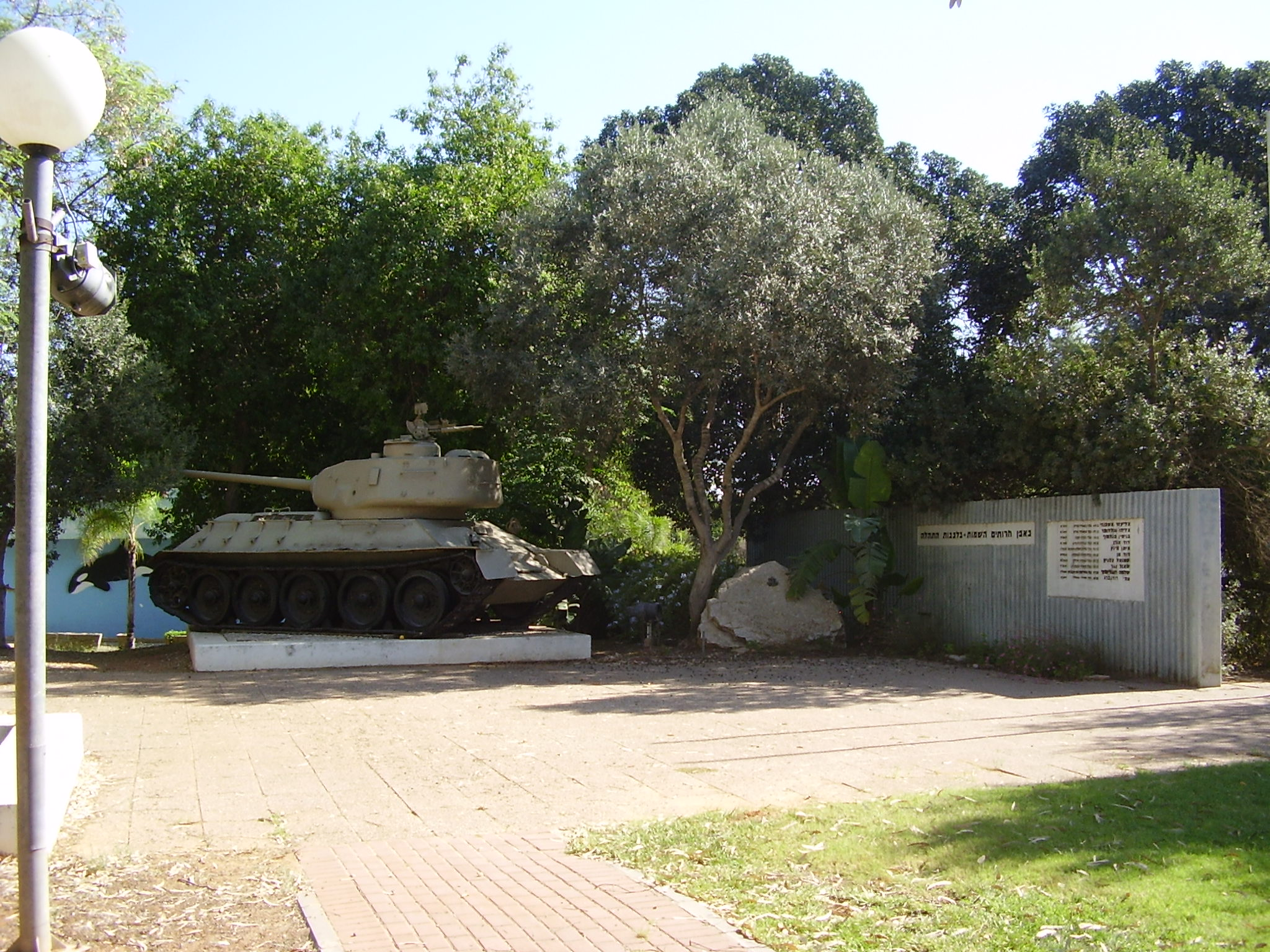
