= Sarid =

Kibbutz in northern Israel

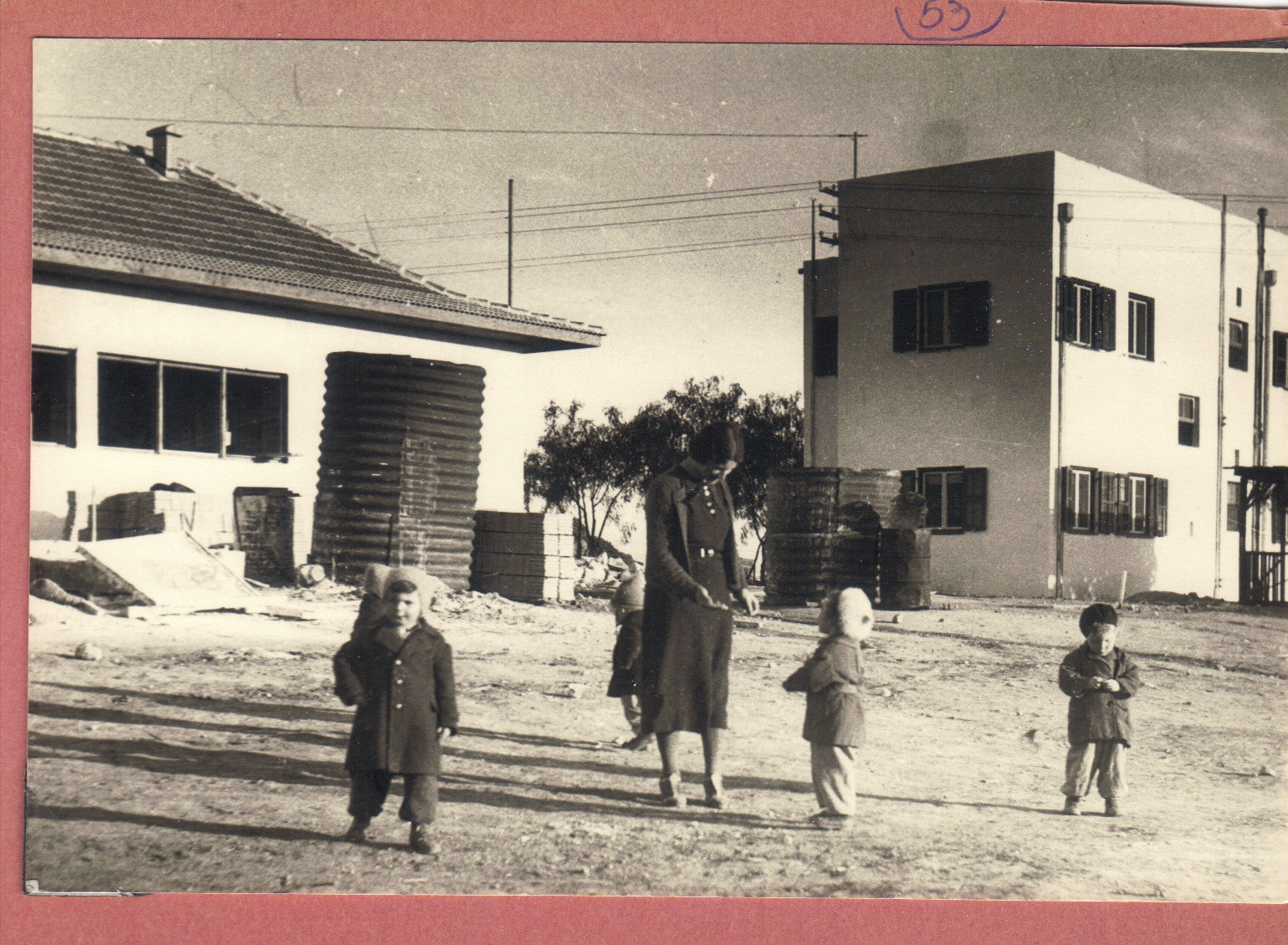

- Location within Jezreel Valley region of Israel
- Coordinates: 32°39′47″N 35°13′33″E
- Country: Israel
- District: Northern
- Subdistrict: Jezreel
- Council: Jezreel Valley
- Affiliation: Kibbutz Movement
- Founded: 1926
- Founder: Polish, Czechoslovak and Soviet Jews
- Population (2024): 1,008
- Website: www.sarid.org.il

Sarid (Hebrew: שָׂרִיד) is a kibbutz in northern Israel. Located near Migdal HaEmek, it falls under the jurisdiction of Jezreel Valley Regional Council. In 2024 it had a population of 1,008.

== History ==
=== Ottoman-era village of Khanâfis ===
During the Ottoman era a Muslim village called Ikhneifis (also Khanâfis and other versions), meaning "beetles", stood at the site of present Sarid. Kneffis, and the neighbouring towns and villages of Nazareth, Mejdal, Yafa, Jebatha and Ma'alul, paid taxes to the monks of Nazareth, who bought the right to collect these taxes from the Ottoman authorities in 1777 for two hundred dollars. Thirty years later, they again purchased this right, though this time for two thousands five hundred dollars, owing to the rise in the price of cereals and ground rents. A map from Napoleon's invasion of 1799 by Pierre Jacotin showed the place, named as Karm Ennefiiceh.

In 1838, Ukhneifis or Khuneifis was noted as a village in the Nazareth District.

In 1882, the PEF's Survey of Western Palestine (SWP) found at Ikhneifis the "ruin of a tower built by Daher el-Omar about a century ago (1162 A.H.)." A population list from about 1887 showed that Ikhneifis had about 40 Muslim inhabitants. Gottlieb Schumacher, as part of surveying for the construction of the Jezreel Valley railway, noted in 1900 that Ikhneifis was a “flourishing village”, consisting of 52 huts and 230 inhabitants, and that the place was the property of the Sursocks, of Beirut.

Moshe Dayan mentioned it as an example of "there is not one place built in this country which did not have a former Arab population".

=== British Mandate era ===
==== The Arab village ====
At the time of the 1922 census of Palestine "Ikhnaifes" had a population of 39, 38 Muslims and 1 Orthodox Christian.

==== The Jewish kibbutz ====
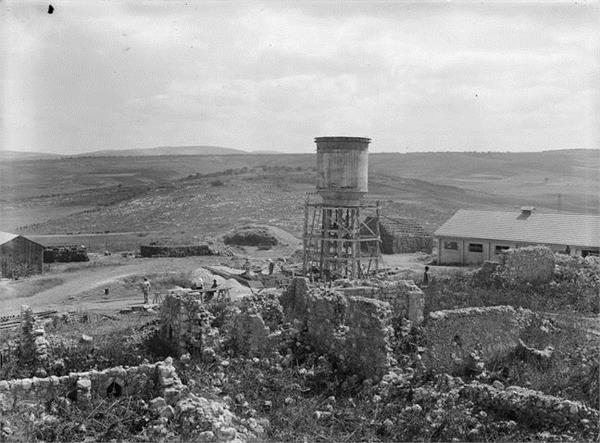
Sarid 1931

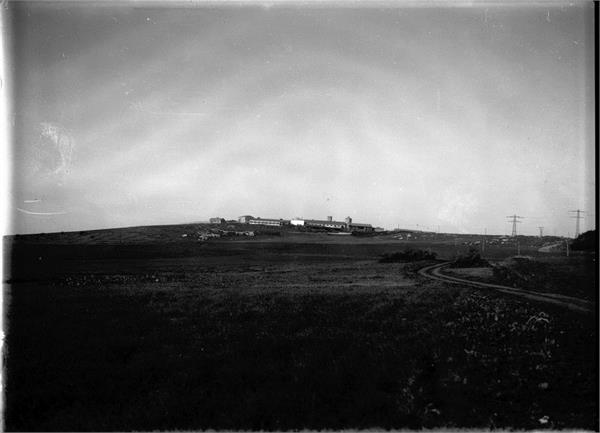
Sarid 1936

The area was acquired by the Jewish community as part of the Sursock Purchase. The kibbutz was established by Jewish immigrants from Czechoslovakia, Poland and Soviet Union in 1926, on lands purchased from the village of Khuneifis. The land was sold by the Sursock family, its absentee landlords. The name was taken from the biblical city of Sarid, situated in the southern part of the tribe of Zebulun (Joshua 19:10). The ancient city is thought to be located in nearby Tel Shadud. By the 1931 census, Sarid had a population of 69, 3 Muslims and 65 Jews, in 9 houses.

== Economy ==
In the 1950s the kibbutz established Camel Grinding Wheels (CGW), which now has three plants for the manufacture of cutting discs, grinding wheels and coated abrasives. One of the more profitable branches was the kibbutz dairy.

== Notable people ==
The poets Natan Yonatan and Pinchas Sadeh and the politicians Natan Peled and Shlomo Rosen were members of the kibbutz. The later Austrian president Heinz Fischer spent a voluntary year (1963) in the kibbutz. The Irish political strategist Morgan McSweeny lived in the Kibutz for several months in the late 1990s.

== Bibliography ==
- Barron, J. B., ed. (1923). Palestine: Report and General Abstracts of the Census of 1922. Government of Palestine.
- Conder, C.R.; Kitchener, H.H. (1882). The Survey of Western Palestine: Memoirs of the Topography, Orography, Hydrography, and Archaeology. Vol. 2. London: Committee of the Palestine Exploration Fund.
- De Haas, J. (1934). History of Palestine - The Last Two Thousand Years. Macmillan.
- Grootkerk, Salomon E. (2000). Ancient sites in Galilee: a toponymic gazetteer (Illustrated ed.). BRILL. ISBN 978-90-04-11535-4.
- Karmon, Y. (1960). "An Analysis of Jacotin's Map of Palestine" (PDF). Israel Exploration Journal. 10 (3, 4): 155–173, 244–253. Archived from the original (PDF) on 2019-12-22.
- Mills, E., ed. (1932). Census of Palestine 1931. Population of Villages, Towns and Administrative Areas. Jerusalem: Government of Palestine.
- Palmer, E.H. (1881). The Survey of Western Palestine: Arabic and English Name Lists Collected During the Survey by Lieutenants Conder and Kitchener, R. E. Transliterated and Explained by E.H. Palmer. Committee of the Palestine Exploration Fund.
- Robinson, E.; Smith, E. (1841). Biblical Researches in Palestine, Mount Sinai and Arabia Petraea: A Journal of Travels in the year 1838. Vol. 3. Boston: Crocker & Brewster.
- Rogan, E.; Shlaim, Avi (2001). The War for Palestine: Rewriting the History of 1948. Cambridge University Press. ISBN 0-521-79476-5.
- Schumacher, G. (1888). "Population list of the Liwa of Akka". Quarterly Statement - Palestine Exploration Fund. 20: 169–191.
- Schumacher, G. (1900). "Reports from Galilee". Quarterly Statement - Palestine Exploration Fund. 32 (4): 355–360. doi:10.1179/peq.1900.32.4.355.
- Stein, K.W. (1987). The Land Question in Palestine, 1917-1939 (Illustrated ed.). UNC Press Books. ISBN 0-807-84178-1.
