= Shanah Tova (song) =

Hebrew children's song

Song
- Language: Hebrew
- English title: A Good Year
- Published: 1923
- Genre: Children's music
- Composer: Nahum Nardi
- Lyricist: Levin Kipnis

Shanah Tova (Hebrew: שנה טובה) is a Hebrew children's song written by Levin Kipnis and composed by Nahum Nardi. It was first published in 1923 in Berlin in a collection of songs to Kindergarten teachers called "Hamachrozet" (the string).

The song is formed as a series of greetings by a child to different people including his parents and main role models in the Jewish Yishuv at the time of the British mandate on Palestine. It is considered one of the most popular children songs for Rosh Hashanah.

== Lyrics ==
Original Hebrew

שנה הלכה, שנה באה
אני כפי ארימה
,שנה טובה לך, אבא
שנה טובה לך, אמא
!שנה טובה, שנה טובה

שנה טובה לדוד גיבור
אשר על המשמרת
,ולכל נוטר, בעיר, בכפר
.ברכת "חזק" נמסרת
!שנה טובה, שנה טובה

,שנה טובה, טייס אמיץ
,רוכב במרום שמיים
,ורוב שלום מלח עברי
.עושה דרכו במים
!שנה טובה, שנה טובה

שנה טובה לכל עמל
,בניר וגם במלט
שנה טובה ומתוקה
!לכל ילדה וילד
!שנה טובה, שנה טובה

Translation:
English translation

A year has gone, A year has come
I will raise my palms
A good year to you, papa.
A good year to you, mamma.
A good year, A good year.

A good year to a hero uncle
Who stands on guard,
And to every Noter, in the city and the village
A "be strong" greeting is forward
A good year, A good year.

A good year, brave pilot
Riding the high heavens
And much peace Hebrew sailor
who makes his way in water
A good year, A good year

A good year to every worker
In the field and in the mortar
A good and sweet year
To every girl and boy!
A good year, A good year!
