= Henya Pekelman =

- הֶניָה מ' פֶּקֶלמן
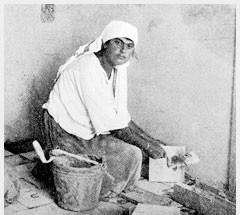
- Born: 1903; Mărculești, Bessarabia, Russian Empire
- Died: 19 January 1940 (aged 36–37); Tel Aviv, Mandatory Palestine
- Occupations: Zionist pioneer, Manual labourer

Henya M. Pekelman (Hebrew: הֶניָה מ' פֶּקֶלמן; 1903 – August 20, 1940) was a Zionist pioneer and manual laborer of the Yishuv who immigrated to Mandatory Palestine in 1922. Her self-published book The Life of a Woman Worker in the Homeland (Hebrew: חיי פועלת בארץ) is recognized as one of the most authentic sources on the life of women laborers in Palestine in the 1920s. She died by suicide in 1940.

== Biography ==
Pekelman was born in Mărculești in Bessarabia Governorate, Russian Empire (in present-day Moldova), to a religious Jewish family of merchants that placed great emphasis on education and diligence. After completing her primary education, she joined the effort of providing for the family. In 1922, after her father's death, she immigrated to Mandatory Palestine with her mother.

In Palestine, Pekelman worked in various manual labor jobs, including concrete casting and flooring. It was Ada Maimon, a fellow Mărculești native ten years her senior, who took her under her wing and suggested that she take on flooring as a profession.

In 1925, Pekelman was raped by Yeruham Mirkin, her acquaintance and neighbor. According to her autobiography, Mirkin blamed Pekelman for speaking ill of him to his boss. The rape resulted in the birth of her first daughter, Tikva, who died one month later, allegedly from poisoning.

Pekelman married Moshe Ba'al Taxa in 1927 and gave to her second daughter, Tzipora, the following year.

In 1935 she self-published her autobiography, The Life of a Woman Laborer in The Homeland, in which she described her childhood, adolescence, and first three years in Mandatory Palestine. At the top of her book she wrote:

"This is the life of a woman laborer
whose homeland dominated her musings"

On January 19, 1940, Pekelman threw herself to her death from the third-floor balcony of the Esther Cinema on Dizengoff Square. The press of the time quoted her financial and family situation as the reason for the suicide.

== The rape affair ==
As told in her book, in 1925 Pekelman travelled to Tel Aviv for a farewell party held by a friend toward his leaving the country. She describes meeting, after the party, a fellow pioneer named Yeruham Mirkin, who insistently invited her to join him in his cousin's room, where she reported he beat her up and raped her.

She returned to Petah Tikva depressed and dispirited, but told no one about the incident. After some time she went back to a flooring job in Tel Aviv, but did not feel well, and a doctor she visited told her she was pregnant. When she confronted Mirkin with that, he denied any involvement with it, and when he learnt about the birth of the baby girl, he ran off.

The baby died about a month later under strange circumstances, and Pekelman was arrested for murder. She told the investigators about the rape, but had no evidence but her word against Mirkin. A representative of the Histadrut bailed her out, but she described her freedom being "worse than hell": she was stared at by everybody, with no friends left to support her, as being a rape victim was considered by the conservative society of those days as a violation of modesty rules, and they suspected her of poisoning her daughter.

== Her struggle for equality in employment ==
Pekelman's struggle for equal opportunity in employment culminated with her return to Tel Aviv. While looking for work on construction sites, she recognized one of the workers she knew. When asked why she didn't work, she insisted that "the men take up all the jobs, and the girls only have household work left for them, and I am not accustomed to that yet." The next day, when she got to work, the men scoffed at her saying she would break until noon. However, she chose to work in the most difficult place, in the middle of the ladder. On pages 153-154 of her book, she described a gathering of workers in her room, where the women workers demanded to work with the men:

The main job in Hadera at that time was the drying up of the marshes. Most women felt that they were as qualified as men for this job and demanded their share in drying the marshes, not to show that they were strong, but to provide with bread to eat; I also attended such a meeting. We proved undisputedly what work we were doing in Tel Aviv: building houses ourselves, poured concrete roofs ourselves, with help from no men. We asked them in what way marsh drying is more difficult than house construction. If there is a fear of malaria – in any case the woman is in the place of the disease, and when she does not have good food she is in danger of catching it anyway, and if because of bodily weakness – then there are also weak men who are not allowed physical work.

== The book: The Life of a Woman Worker in Her Homeland ==
Pekelman's publishing of her autobiographical book was self-financed. The book tells her story in first person style, from her childhood, adolescence and immigration to Mandatory Palestine. It describes her attempts to integrate into the work and social life in the country, and the crisis following the violent events she went through.

The book allows for a historical examination of the gaps that emerge between the idealization of the historical narrative and reality, as experienced by the author.

In 2007 the book was re-published with annotations, including an epilogue of two essays, one by David De Vries and Talia Pfefferman, and the second by Tamar Hess, all three of them from the Tel Aviv University. The re-publication was part of the "Critical Essays" series of the Heksherim Research Institute for Jewish & Israeli Literature & Culture, inin collaboration with the Ben-Gurion University. Following a reference to Pekelman's book in the book A Woman in Eretz-Yisra'el by Deborah S. Bernstein (Tel Aviv, Hakibbutz Hameuchad, 1987), Hess had found a copy of the book at the National Library of Israel, and was probably the first to request this copy.

=== The book's importance as a historical source ===
In Henya Pekelman's stories, the pattern of her voice being silenced can be taken as a symbol for the general frequent silencing of women's voices in those times. Her book is regarded as one of the most authentic sources on laborer's life in Mandatory Palestine in the 1920s. its uniqueness lies in the fact that in it history speaks to us through the mouth of an ordinary person, contrary to most narratives covering political leaders and elite groups.

Another importance of the book is found in the social and political contexts in which it was written: Although at the beginning women were considered equal to men in various sectors of the economy, by the time the British mandate had begun, there was an expectation that they return to their traditional roles: childbirth, childcare, education and home care.

In her insistence on continuing to perform duties outside the home, such as fruit picking, dairy farming or tobacco field work, Pekelman sounds the voices of women who were excluded by a society that was essentially run by men.

== Her daughter and granddaughter ==
Tzipora, Pekelman's second daughter, moved to the Tel Aviv "Pioneers' House" and later on to Kibbutz Yagur. She married Shalom Bornstein and in 1945 gave birth to Pekelman's granddaughter, Ein-Yah Tamir, and divorced Bornstein. She then moved to Kibbutz Manara and married David Tamir.

Tzipora is reported to have hidden Pekelman's book from her daughter, an act that combined with the general disregard of the book by the press at the time.
