= Levin Kipnis =

Israeli author and poet

- לֶוִין קִיפְּנִיס
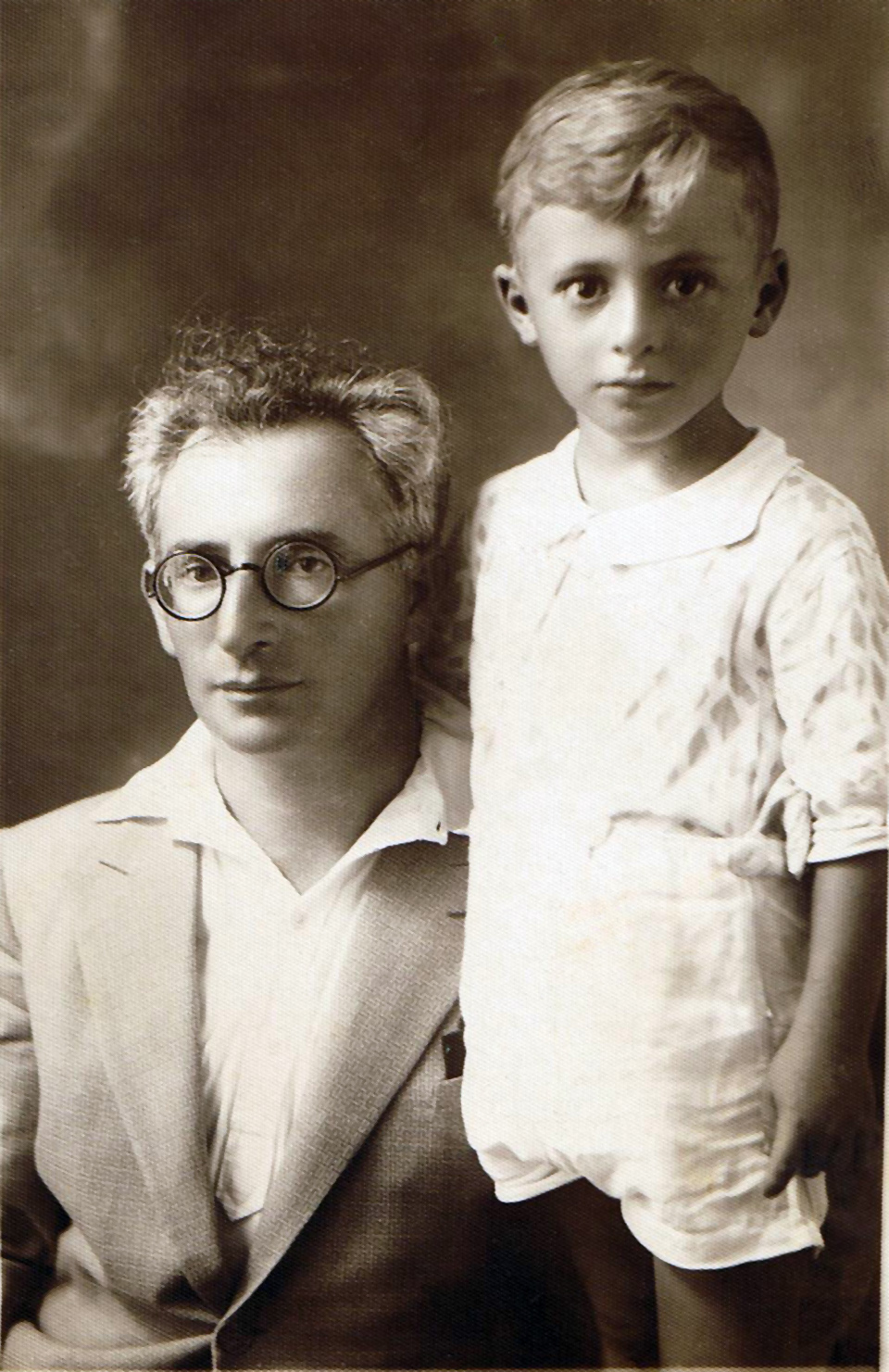
- Levin Kipnis and his firstborn son, Shai (1930-1935)
- Born: Levin Kipnis; 1 August 1894; Ushomyr, Volhynian Governorate, Russian Empire
- Died: 20 June 1990 (aged 95); Tel Aviv, Israel
- Occupations: Children's author, poet
- Writing career
- Language: Hebrew, Yiddish
- Notable work: Shanah Tova
- Notable awards: Yatsiv Prize for Children's Literature (1962); Lamdan Prize for Children's Literature (1976); Israel Prize for children's literature (1978)

Levin Kipnis (Hebrew: לֶוִין קִיפְּנִיס; 1 August 1894 – 20 June 1990), or was born 1890, was an Israeli children's author and poet who wrote mainly in Hebrew and Yiddish. He won the Israel Prize in 1978.

== Biography ==
Kipnis was born in the shtetl of Ushomir, Volhynian Governorate which was part of the Pale of Settlement of the Russian Empire, in the Russian Partition of Poland (now Ushomyr in Korosten Raion of Zhytomyr Oblast, Ukraine), into a family of 12. His father, Pessach, who was a shaliach tzibbur (Jewsih public prayer leader), sent him to study in a cheder, which he didn't like because of the strict discipline. He showed a passion for the arts from a young age, painting and woodcarving. His father, who saw his potential, encouraged him to become a sofer stam (Jewish religious scribe). He wrote mezuzot to provide additional income for the family.

He decided to become a writer at the age of 13, after seeing the Hebrew children's magazine "Haprachim" ("the flowers"). In his attic, he wrote, illustrated and produced his own magazine, later submitting one of his stories, "the sick child" to the children's magazine. The story was published in 1910. Kipnis completed his education in Zhytomyr and Warsaw, then went back to his hometown, where he founded a cheder metukan ("improved cheder"), established a Hebrew library and wrote and directed plays. In 1913, he emigrated to Ottoman Palestine and continued his arts education at the Bezalel Academy of Art and Design. The lack of content for children of kindergarten age convinced him to write songs suited for preschoolers.

With the outbreak of World War I, Kipnis established the "Little Library for Children" publisher in Jaffa, while concurrently doing agricultural forced labor for the Ottoman military. After the war he returned to Jerusalem at the invitation of Bezalel to write and edit content for preschoolers and published story and song collections for children as well as the first magazine for preschool teachers "Ganenu" ("our garden" or "our kindergarten").

In 1921, he managed an orphanage in Safed. In 1922, he traveled to Berlin, Germany for advanced studies in art and craftsmanship. There he published three books in German. He returned in 1923 and began teaching at the Levinsky Teacher's College in Tel Aviv (now part of the Levinsky-Wingate Academic Center).

In 1928, Kipnis wrote plays and participated actively in the foundation of a children's theater, later known as "Teatron Hagananot" ("the preschool-teacher theater"), where some well known Hebrew performers such as Bracha Zefira and Sara Levi-Tanai participated.

In 1956, he retired from his job as an educator and dedicated his time to writing.

Kipnis's writing is characterized by a light and happy style, devoid of pathos, yet rich and aesthetic. His collections in Hebrew encompass about 800 stories and 600 poems. Kipnis also wrote songs in Hebrew, including Shanah Tova. He also wrote children's books in Yiddish, publishing a collection in 1961. His work was translated into English, French, German, Russian, Arabic and Yiddish. He was active as a writer for 80 years, from 1910 to 1990.

Kipnis died in 1990 in Tel Aviv.

The archive of his work is at the Levin Kipnis Center for Children's Literature, Levinsky Teachers' College. The center awards a bi-annual prize named after Kipnis for a research project about children's literature. In 2020 a poem, written by Kipnis as a boy in 1905, was found in the Boris Schatz Archives at the Information Center for Israeli Art.

== Awards and honors ==
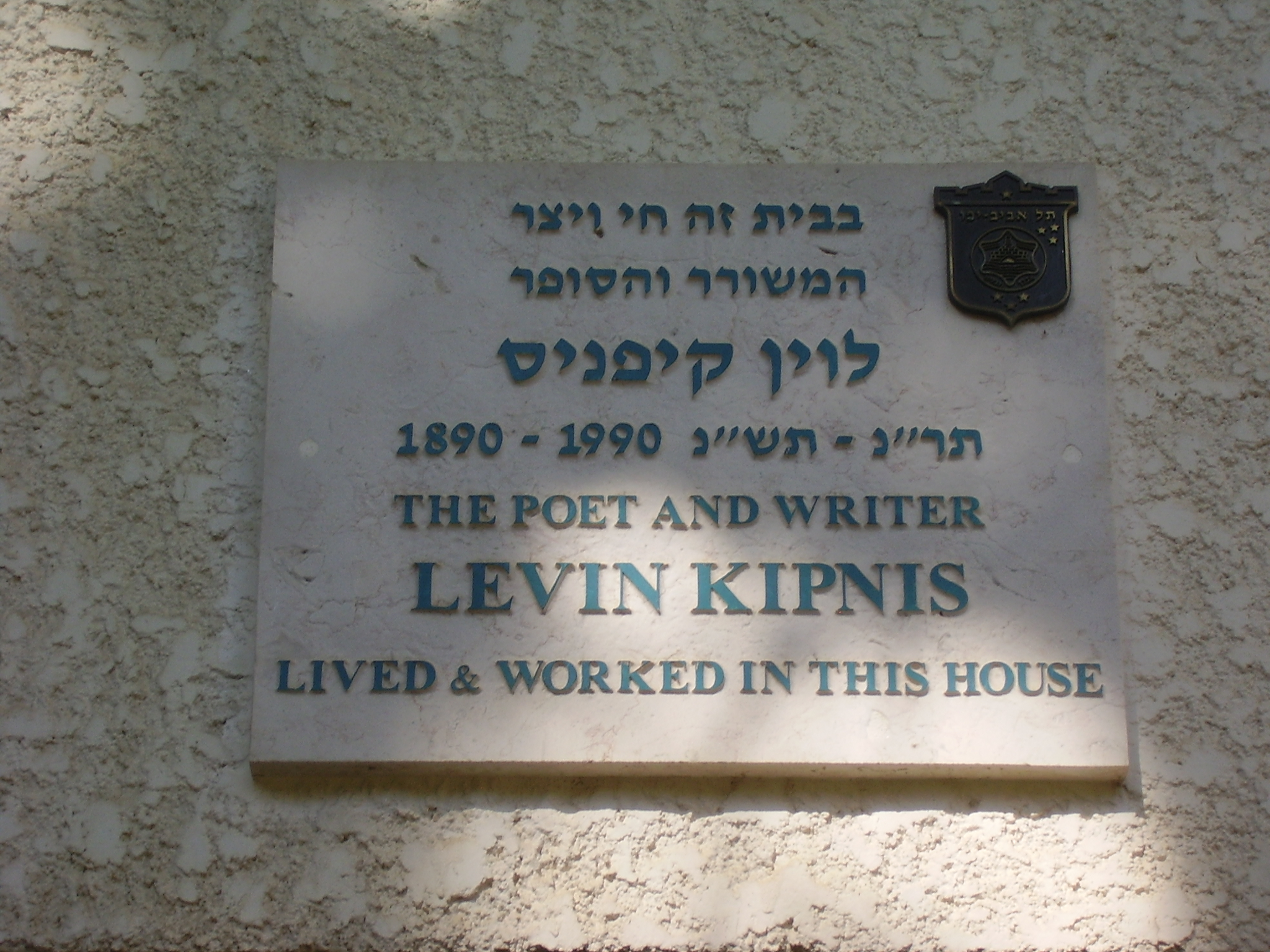
Memorial plaque to Levin Kipnis in Tel Aviv

- In 1962, Kipnis was awarded the Yatsiv Prize for Children's Literature.
- In 1976, he received the Lamdan Prize for Children's Literature.
- In 1978, he was awarded the Israel Prize, for children's literature.

Street are named after him in Be'er Sheva and Tel Aviv

Two awards were established in his honor:

- ACUM Levin Kipnis award for extraordinary children's creative works
- Levin Kipnis Prize for the Study of Hebrew Children's Literature from the Levinsky-Wingate Academic Center and the Levin Kipnis Center

== Bibliography ==
=== Books published in Hebrew ===
==== Children ====
- By the Ancestor's Grave, Berlin-Hasefer, 1923 [Le-Kever Avot]
- Aleph-Beit, Berlin-Hasefer, 1923 [Aleph-Beit]
- A String, Omanut, 1923 [Mahrozet]
- The Story of the Chick Who Wanted a New Mother, Omanut, 1923 [Ma'aseh Be-Efroah She Halach Levakesh Em Aheret]
- Shele-Pele, Dvir, 1925 [Shele-Pele]
- Shulamita, Dvir, 1925 [Shulamita]
- Velvet and Her Puppies, Dvir, 1925 [Ketifah Ve-Gureha]
- Listen and I Will Tell You, Dvir, 1925 [Shim'u Va-Asapera]
- Hasty Goat, Dvir, 1926 [Iza Peziza]
- The Compassionate Donkey, Dvir, 1926 [He-Hamor He-Rahum]
- The Exiled Palm Branch, Dvir, 1926 [Ha-Lulav Ha-Goleh]
- The Queen of Geese, Dvir, 1926 [Malkat Ha-Avazim]
- The Scarecrow, Dvir, 1927 [Ha-Dahlil]
- Country Children, Dvir, 1927 [Yaldei Sadeh]
- The Story of the Wandering Apple, Dvir, 1927 [Ma'ase Be-Tpuah She-Halach Lasuah]
- Four and a Bulb, Dvir, 1928 [Arba Benei Peka'at]
- The Story of a Paper Rose, Dvir, 1928 [Ma'ase Be-Vered Shel Nyar]
- Zamzuma, Dvir, 1928 [Zamzuma]
- The Tiger Who Almost Changed Its Spots, Dvir, 1928 [Ha-Namer She-Halach Lahafoch Havarburotav]
- Counting, Dvir, 1929 [Sefirah]
- Purim Spiel, Stybel, 1929 [Mishak Purim]
- The Sea's Gift, Stybel, 1930 [Matnat Ha-Yam]
- The Story of the Harbor, Stybel, 1930 [Ma'ase Be-Namal]
- The Oil Jar, Stybel, 1930 [Kad Ha-Shemen]
- Butterflies, Dvir, 1930 [Parparim]
- Who Is That? Dvir, 1930 [Mi Zeh?]
- What Is That? Dvir, 1930 [Ma Zeh?]
- Chanukah for Toddlers, L. Kipnis, 1932 [Hanukah Le-Tinokot]
- First Fruits, Kupat Hasefer, 1932 [Bikurim]
- The Blue Collection, I. Shimoni, 1939 [Ha-sifriah Ha-Kehulah L'Yeladim]
- The Western Wall, Sion, 194- [Ha-Kotel Ha-Ma'aravi]
- Lit up Candles, Dfus Arieli, 1940 [Nerot Dolkim]
- Dew, I. Shimoni, 1941 [Tal]
- David and Goliath, Fisher, 1941 [David Ve-Goliat]
- What Do Animals Say? Fisher, 1942 [Ha-Hayot Ma Omrot]
- Folks, Massada, 1942 [Hevraya]
- 310 Riddles, Ever, 1943 [Shai Hidot]
- Good Morning, Massada, 1943 [Boker Tov]
- The Festival of Light, Rudin, 1946 [Hag Ha-Or]
- Clandestine Children, Dvir, 1946 [Yeladim Be-Mahteret]
- My Kindergarten, Twersky, 1949 [Gan-Gani]
- My Holidays, Twersky, 1949 [Hagai]
- Thus Spoke Grandpa, Stybel, 1950 [Ko Amar Saba]
- Lion the Hero, 1950 [Ha-Arieh Ha-Gibor]
- First Kindergarten, Twersky, 1954 [Gan-Ganon]
- The Extraordinary Path, Dvir, 1954 [Bi'Ntiv Ha-Pele]
- Light, Dekel, 1957 [Or]
- 150 Riddles, Karni, 1958 [Ken Hidot]
- Quiz for Children, Karni, 1958 [Hidon Le-Yeladim]
- Playground, S. Zak, 1958 [Pinah Ginah]
- Phanty the Elephant, S. Zak, 1959 [Pil Palil]
- March!, S. Zak, 1959 [Kadima Tz'ad!]
- About Two and Four, Dvir, 1960 [Al Shtayim Ve-Al Arba]
- The State of Israel, Karni, 1960 [Medinat Israel]
- Mr. Coxcomb Went to the Army, Sh. Zimenson, 1964 [Mar Karbol Hitgayess]
- Eliezer and the Carrot, Sh. Zimenson, 1964 [Eliezer Ve-Ha-Gezer]
- Chen Gave, Chen Took Away, Sh. Zimenson, 1964 [Hen Natan, Hen Lakah]
- Under The Palm Tree, Kiriat Sefer, 1965 [Be-Tzel Ha-Tomer]
- A Nice Walk, Sh. Zimenson, 196- [Tiyul Na'im]
- My Friends, Sh. Zimenson, 196- [Haverim Sheli]
- Biki In Disguise, Sh. Zimenson, 1966 [Biki Mithapes]
- I Have a Light, Sh. Zimenson, 1966 [Or Li]
- Six in a Little Bag, Sh. Zimenson, 1966 [Shesh Be-Sakik Ehad]
- Doron's Celebration in Tel Aviv, Sh. Zimenson, 1966 [Doron Hogeg Be-Tel Aviv]
- Beit, Karni, 1967 [Bayit]
- The Wagtail Builds a Nest, Kimchi, 1968 [Ha-Nahlieli Boneh Ken]
- Foxy's Visit to the Hen House, Kimchi, 1968 [Sha'alul She-Halach La-Lul]
- Quiz on the Tora for Children, Karni, 1968 [Hidon Ha-Torah Le-Yeladim]
- First Grades, Sh. Zimenson, 1969 [Yaldei Aleph Beit]
- This Is My Book, Twersky, 1969 [Ze Sifri]
- The Daffodil's Crown, Twersky, 1969 [Keter Ha-Narkis]
- Roni-Ron and the Spinning-Top, Kimchi, 1970 [Roni-Ron Ve-Ha-Sevivon]
- A Good Citizen, Kimchi, 1970 [Ezrah Tov]
- Etty Wants Cookies, Kimchi, 1970 [Etty Rotzah Ugiot]
- Open the Door, Kimchi, 1970 [Pithu Et Ha-Delet]
- Milli Loves Flowers, Sh. Zimenson, 1971 [Milli Ohevet Perahim]
- Milli In the Country, Sh. Zimenson, 1971 [Milli Ba-Meshek]
- Milli Goes to the Kindergarten, Sh. Zimenson, 1971 [Milli Holechet La-Gan]
- Milli at the Sea Coast, Sh. Zimenson, 1971 [Milli Al Sefat Ha-Yam]
- Milli and Her Puppy, Sh. Zimenson, 1971 [Milli Ve-Ha-Klavlav Shelah]
- Wear It Well!, Sh. Zimenson, 1971 [Tithadesh]
- Shavuot, Sh. Zimenson, 1973 [Shavuot]
- The Tabernacles Festival, Sh. Zimenson, 1973 [Sukot]
- Independence, Sh. Zimenson, 1973 [Atzmaut]
- The Independence Story, Karni, 1973 [Agadah Shel Atzmaut]
- From Genesis, R. Mass, 1973 [Mi-Be-Reshit]
- Rosh Hashanah-Yom Kippur, Sh. Zimenson, 1973 [Rosh Hashanah-Yom Kippur]
- Fables, Sh. Zimenson, 1974 [Meshalim]
- Shabbat, Sh. Zimenson, 1974 [Shabbat]
- The 33rd Day of the Omer, Sh. Zimenson, 1974 [Lag Ba-Omer]
- Who Is Brave?, Zelkovitz, 1975 [Mi Ben Hayil?]
- Tulips, Zelkovitz, 19.. [Tziv'onim]
- Walking in Fields and Forests, Zelkovitz, 1975 [Holchim Ba-Sadeh U-Ba-Ya'ar]
- Esty Is Looking for a Father, Bronfman, 1976 [Esty Mehapeset Aba]
- Stories From the Bible, Sh. Zimenson, 1976 [Min Ha-Torah]
- Beetles, Bronfman, 1976 [Hipushiot]
- Times, Sh. Zimenson, 1976 [Zemanim]
- Five Girls, Keter, 1977 [Hamesh Banot]
- Aleph, Karni, 1977 [Aleph]
- My State of Israel, Yaad, 1978 [Medinati Israel]
- Meromtzion, Sh. Zimenson, 1978 [Meromtzion]
- Scarecrow the King, Yaad, 1979 [Dahlimelech]
- Once Upon a Time There Was a King, Lichtenfeld, 1980 [Hayo Haya Melech]
- House of Peace, Or-Am, 1980 [Beit Shalom]
- Honor Your Mother, Lichtenfeld, 1980 [Kavod Le-Ima]
- The Story of Seven Girls, Alon, 1980 [Ma'ase Be-Yeladot Sheva]
- The Golden Nut, Tamuz, 1983 [Egoz Shel Zahav]
- Tzachi's Long Night, Lichtenfeld, 1985 [Leilo He-Aroch Shel Tzahi]
- Osnat's Grandma, Dekel, 1986 [Sabta Shel Osnat]
- Nightwatch, Dekel, 1987 [Shomer Ma Milel]
- Story Hour, Sh. Zimenson, 1987 [Sha'at Sipur]
- Thelma, Bar, 1988 [Talma]
- Jackal, Dekel, 1989 [Tan]
- Gluttons, Sh. Zimenson, 1989 [Lakekanim]
- All the Husham Stories, Tamuz-Oumani, 1989 [Col Sipurei Husham]
- Elijah's Cup, Sh. Zimenson, 1989 [Koso Shel Eliahu]
- Tali's Flight, Sh. Zimenson, 1989 [Eich Tas Tali]
- Tali Gets Asleep, Sh. Zimenson, 1989 [Eich Nirdam Tali]
- Branches for the Tabernacle, Sh. Zimenson, 1989 [Schach La-Sukah]
- Wheels, Sh. Zimenson, 1989 [Galgalim]
- Nobody Is Like Us Bears!, Tamuz-Modan, 1989 [Mi Camonu Ha-Dubim]
- Eliphele Learns How to Read, Sh. Zimenson, 1989 [Elifele Lomed Likro]
- It Happened to a Hamentash, Sh. Zimenson, 1989 [Ma'ase Be-Ozen Aman]
- My Faithful Dog, Tamuz, 1990 [Ha-Kelev Ha-Ne'eman Sheli]
- Levanah and Her Puppies, Tamuz-Modan, 1990 [Ha-Kalbah Levana Ve-Gureha]
- Armona the Mare and her Colt, Tamuz-Modan, 1990 [Ha-Susah Armona Ve-Siahah]
- There Are Foxes There, Tamuz-Modan, 1990 [Sham Shualim Yesh]
- Horses, Tamuz-Modan, 1990 [Susiiada]
- Tul the Cat, Sh. Zimenson, 1991 [Tul He-Hatul]
- It Happened to Ram, Korim, 1997 [Ma'ase Be-Ram]

=== Books in translation ===
- The Daffodil's Crown, Arabic: Nazareth, Pair Ofest, 1966
- My Holidays, English: Tel Aviv, Twersky, 1961
