= Third Aliyah =

1919–1923 wave of Jewish immigration to Palestine

The Third Aliyah (Hebrew: העלייה השלישית, romanized: HaAliyah HaShlishit) refers to the third wave, or aliyah, of modern Jewish immigration to Palestine from Europe. This wave lasted from 1919, just after the end of World War I, until 1923, at the start of an economic crisis in Palestine.

35,000 to 40,000 Jews arrived in Palestine during the Third Aliyah. The bellwether of the Third Aliyah was the ship SS Ruslan, which arrived at Jaffa Port on December 19, 1919, carrying 671 new immigrants and people returning after being stranded in Europe during the war. The pioneers of the Third Aliyah originated mainly from Eastern European countries: 45% from Russia, 31% from Poland, 5% from Romania, and 3% from Lithuania.

== History ==
Three secret commitments of Great Britain, substantially contradicting each other, formed the basis for the conflicts that followed thereafter:

- In October 1915, the British pledged to recognise the independence of an Arab state within the boundaries proposed by the Sherif of Mekka, i.e. including Palestine, in exchange for Arabic support of the British attempt to fight and defeat the Ottomans. See McMahon–Hussein Correspondence.
- In January 1916, a secret treaty between the UK and France, the Sykes–Picot Agreement, divided the Ottoman provinces outside the Arabian Peninsula between the British and the French. The British would be granted Palestine and Jordan, the French would occupy Lebanon and Syria.
- In November 1917, the Balfour Declaration promised the Jews that they could settle in Palestine and create "a national home for the Jewish people" there.

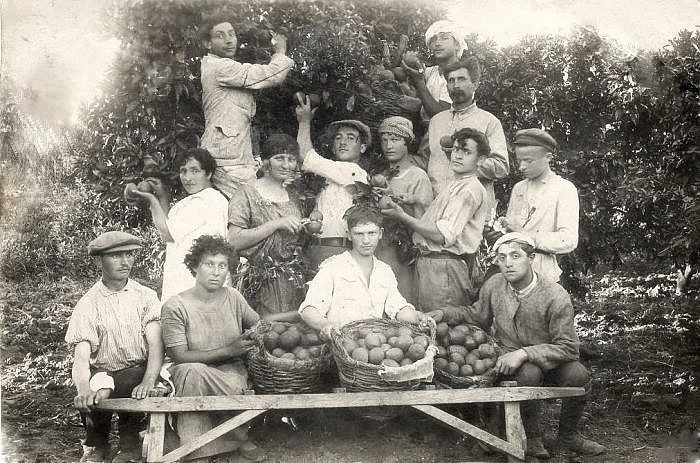
Farmers of Ein Ganim, 1923

Among the immigrants of the Second Aliyah (1904–1914) were a few thousand young pioneers influenced by the socialist ideas of Ber Borochov and the concept "religion of labor" by A. D. Gordon. One key idea of the Third Aliyah was a continuation of the Second—the establishment of a socialist Jewish society in the Land of Israel. In hindsight one can state that the attempts of immigrants from the First Aliyah in hard manual labor failed clamorously, while the pioneers from the Second Aliyah fought hard and the young men and women from the Third Aliyah succeeded right from the beginning. They built roads and bridges, they drained swamps and they set up functioning farms. Many of them were already trained in Russia for a life of farming.

But, since World War I, the basis for all immigration to Palestine had changed fundamentally. The Ottomans had withdrawn, and the British had taken power—despite promises to the Arabs to the contrary. The League of Nations, established in early 1920, gave the British the mandate to administer Palestine. The Third Aliyah was triggered mainly by pogroms during the Russian Civil War as well as the Balfour Declaration, and it was hindered by the British quotas.

== Motivation ==
In the 1960s Everett S. Lee described the push and pull factors in migration. This model can also be applied to prior migration waves.

Immigrants had high hopes for a new future in the Holy Land, but more than that, they were pushed to immigrate due to the developments in Europe and the growth of the nationalism aspirations of various minority groups. Several factors motivated the immigrants:

- The Russian Revolution and the ensueing Russian Civil War led to a wave of pogroms. An estimated 100,000 Jews were killed and 500,000 left homeless.
- Upheaval in Europe in the aftermath of World War I with nationalist awakenings amongst the eastern European nations following the birth of nine new countries.
- In the new countries which were formed after World War I there was the "problem of the minorities". Battles erupted between small ethnic groups, with riots in divided countries like Poland.
- An economic crisis in Europe
- The enactment of Emergency Quota Act, which limited immigration to the United States
- The relative success of the absorption of the Second Aliyah to Israel and the socialist ideologies of the wave.

The official Zionist institutions were opposed to the third immigration wave. They feared that the country would not be able to absorb such a great number of people. They even requested that only people who had enough economic resources come to the country. However, the harsh reality changed their expectations: the bad economic situation of Jews of Eastern Europe, and also the riots, forced many to emigrate to countries which did open their gates—the United States and Western Europe—and to those who had a pioneering impulse and a Zionist recognition, Palestine was suitable as their new home.

== Social makeup ==
Many of the new immigrants of the Third Aliyah were affiliated with the youth movements HeHalutz and Hashomer Hatzair. Most of them were socialist-oriented and secular, even anti-religious. Their intention was to build not the Jewish state, but a socialist state.

Pioneers

Most of the newcomers were young halutzim (pioneers), who built roads and towns and commenced the draining of marshes in the Jezreel Valley. Afterwards they became a smaller proportion of the immigrants. The importance of those pioneers was just as great as that of the pioneers of the Second Aliyah. Their ideology contributed a great deal to the construction of Palestine, and so they imprinted their mark on Zionism and also on the development of the Jewish settlements in Palestine.

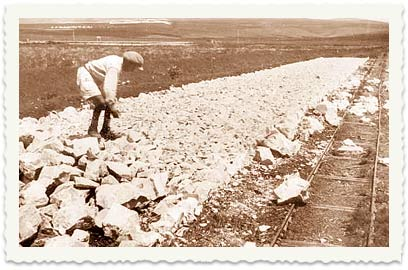
Road construction, Ein Harod

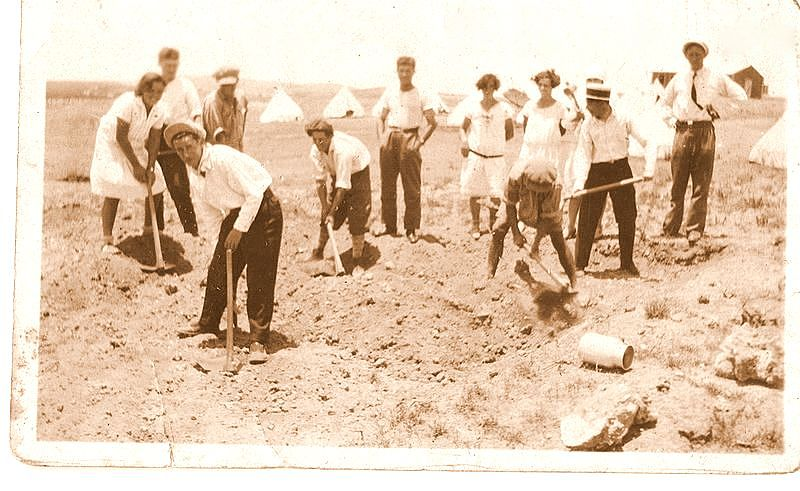
Third Aliyah pioneers, 1921

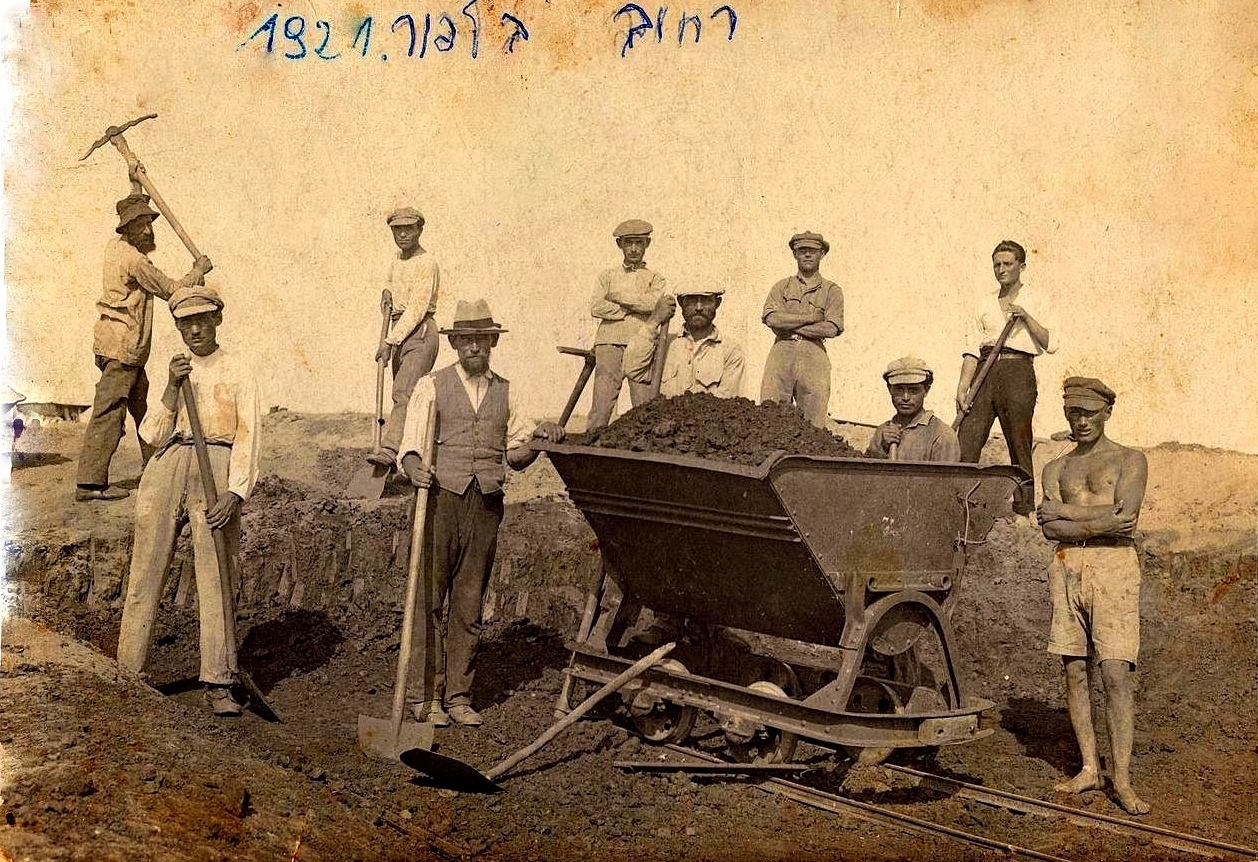
Jewish pioneers building Balfour Street in Tel Aviv, 1921

Intellectuals

The list below shows that also many intellectuals and artists were part of the Third Aliyah.

== Institutions ==
Histadrut, the General Labor Federation, was established at this time, the Elected Assembly and the National Council were founded, also Haganah, a clandestine paramilitary organization.

== Personalities ==
Among the immigrants to Palestine during the Third Aliyah were people who later-on founded the State of Israel, including David Ben-Gurion and Golda Meir, and also several prominent activists and intellectuals. Many of them would later become pioneers in Israeli culture.

- Baruch Agadati (1895–1976), dancer and choreographer
- Rachel Bluwstein (1890–1931), known as "Rachel the Poetess"; returned to Palestine on board the Ruslan
- Joseph Constant (1892–1969), sculptor, painter and novelist, arrived on board the Ruslan with his wife
- Menachem Elkind (1897–1938), Zionist activist and one of the founders of Gdud HaAvoda
- Yitzhak Frenkel (1899–1981), painter and sculptor, member of the Ecole de Paris
- Uri Zvi Greenberg (1896–1981), poet, journalist and activist, who wrote in Yiddish and Hebrew, immigrated in 1923.
- Joseph Klausner (1874–1958), historian from Lithuania, later-on professor of Hebrew literature
- Yitzhak Lamdan (1899–1954), Hebrew–language poet, translator and editor
- Yehuda Magidovitch (1886–1981), architect from Uman
- Arieh Navon (1909–1996), painter, illustrator and cartoonist
- Henya Pekelman (1903–1940), Zionist pioneer, woman manual laborer, women's equality activist partisan and rape victim; the autobiography she wrote provides a rare documentation of daily life in Eretz Yisrael of those times.
- Zeev Rechter (1899–1960), architect from Kovalivka, Odesa Oblast
- Yitzhak Sadeh (1890–1952), one of the founders of Gdud HaAvoda, later-on commander of the Palmach
- Menachem Ussishkin (1863–1941), Zionist leader

Many of them arrived in Palestine in December 1919 on board the Ruslan.
