= Yitzhak Lamdan =

Israeli Hebrew-language poet, translator, editor and columnist

- יצחק למדן
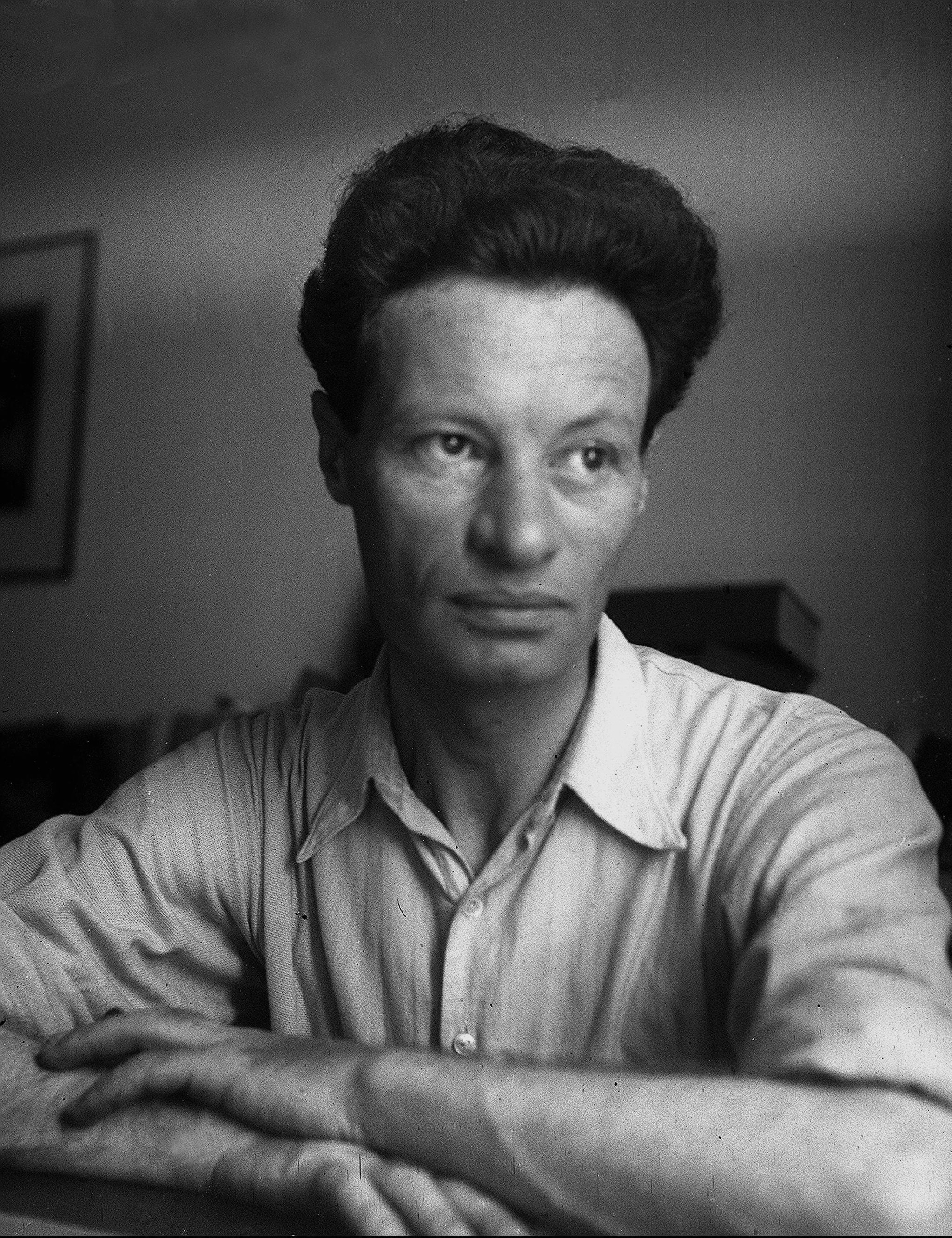
- Lamdan in 1934
- Born: 7 November 1897; Mlynov, Russian Empire (now Mlyniv, Ukraine)
- Died: 17 November 1954 (aged 55); Tel Aviv, Israel
- Occupations: Poet; translator; editor; columnist
- Awards: Israel Prize (1955) (posthumous)

Yitzhak Lamdan (Hebrew: יצחק למדן; 7 November 1897 – 17 November 1954) was a Russian-born Israeli Hebrew-language poet, translator, editor and columnist.

== Biography ==
Itzi-Yehuda Lubes or Lobes (later Yitzhak Lamdan) was born in 1897 in Mlynov, Russia (now Mlyniv, Ukraine). Sources which identity his birthdate in November 1899 are mistaken, as evident in his diary, which identifies his 18th birthday as the 5th of Kislev 5676 (see his entry for Nov. 12 1915).

Born into an affluent family, Lamdan lived in Mlynov (also spelled Mlinov) until the outbreak of World War I and the civil wars that followed. Lamdan wrote a diary in Hebrew while still in Mlynov describing his life and his burning desire to make aliyah to the Land of Israel. The diary covers the period from 1914 just before World War I, when he was 16, until 1924, not long before he published his famous poem, Masada, in Mandatory Palestine. A translation of the diary to English is in process and translated up until April 1917. Some details about Lamdan's early life also appear in the Mlynov-Mervits Memorial Book, such as his involvement in an early failed attempt with the few young Zionists in town to send Yaakov-Yosi to the Land of Israel. The Memorial book also includes a description of Lamdan's father, R. Yehuda Lubes.

During World War I, Lamdan fled Mlynov with his brother and was a refugee for a time in Dubno, Lutsk, and Hubyn Pershyi, then under Austrian control, before finally rejoining his family in Baranovka, Russia, in 1916. After his mother died, he fled further east to avoid conscription into the Russian army and was in Pryluky, Russia when the February Revolution took place. He was subsequently uprooted and wandered through Southern Russia with his brother before joining the Red Army. In 1920, after his parents’ home was destroyed and his brother was killed, Lamdan immigrated to Mandatory Palestine as part of a socialist youth group in what has come to be known in Zionist history as the Third Aliyah.

In 1927, he published the Hebrew epic poem, Masada: A Historical Epic, about the Jewish struggle for survival in a world full of enemies, in which Masada, as a symbol for the Land of Israel and the Zionist enterprise, was seen as a refuge, but also as a potential ultimate trap. The poem was hugely influential, creating the seed for what became the Masada myth, but the latter aspect was left out in its mainstream Zionist reception and interpretation. According to literary scholar and cultural historian David G. Roskies, Lamdan's poem even inspired the uprising in the Warsaw Ghetto.

== Awards and recognition ==
- In 1955, after his death, Lamdan was awarded the Israel Prize, for literature.
- Brenner Prize

From 1954 until 1983, the Ramat Gan Municipality, in conjunction with the Hebrew Writers Association in Israel, awarded the annual Lamdan Prize in his memory, for literary works for children and youth.

== See also ==
- List of Israel Prize recipients
