= Kalkidan =

Kalkidan (Amharic: ቃልኪዳን) is an Amharic language name, literally meaning "promise", "covenant". Notable people with the name include:

- Kalkidan Fentie (born 1998), Ethiopian runner
- Kalkidan Gezahegne (born 1991), Ethiopian-born Bahraini runner
- The protagonist of the novel Kalkidan by Dorit Orgad
