= Ani Etgaber =

1970 novel by Dvora Omer

Ani Etgabaer
- Author: Dvora Omer
- Original title: אני אתגבר
- Illustrator: Elizabeth Landau
- Language: Hebrew
- Publication date: 1970
- Publication place: Israel
- Media type: Print
- Pages: 173

Ani Etgaber (Hebrew: אני אתגבר lit. 'I will overcome') is 1970 Hebrew novel by Israeli author Dvora Omer. The book's plot line follows the path of a young girl with cerebral palsy, Gila, as she grows up. It shows her struggles through childhood, adolescent, and beyond.

== Plot summary ==
Ani Etgaber follows Gila's life story. Gila is a young woman with cerebral palsy. The storyline unfolds from her birth to her journey into young adulthood. Initially, when Gila was born, her parents did not perceive any issues. However, as time passed, they began to notice a lack of movement, including the absence of crawling. At the age of six months, Gila received a diagnosis of cerebral palsy.

Throughout her formative years, Gila rarely left her house, presenting a distinctive appearance, behavior, and speech. Childhood brought many challenges, as other children may wanted to play with her, yet parentes hindered were wary of her and kept their children away from her. Gila's kindergarten teacher didn't accept her in until her mother volunteered in the kingergarden. Despite the teacher agreement, parental concerns persisted, leading to her to leave. A similar scenario unfolded in school, where her teacher didn't let her enter the class until the principal intervened. Over time, the teacher developed a close bond with Gila, even extending her tenure by teaching the class for five years solely for Gila's benefit.

Gila's family provided unwavering support, navigating both physical and financial challenges associated with caring for a disabled child. The narrative then transitions to Gila's high school years, exploring her efforts to navigate societal norms, build relationships, and confront her differences.

Later, Gila enters into a relationship with Yoram during her studies. However, she eventually decides to end the relationship, believing her disability imposes limitations on him. To help her family financially, Gila discovers a passion for education while tutoring children.

The conclusion of the book reveals Gila, now 22 years old, as a teacher at a special education school. Starting to study psychology at the university.
