= Janice Rebibo =

American poet

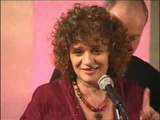
Janice Rebibo, Tel Aviv, December, 2007

Janice Rebibo (Hebrew: ג'ניס רביבו; née Silverman; January 31, 1950 – March 11, 2015) was an American-born Israeli poet who began writing in Hebrew in the mid-1980s.

== Biography ==
Janice Silverman Rebibo was born in Boston, Massachusetts and studied at Boston Hebrew College. She later immigrated to Israel. Rebibo died of cancer, aged 65. She is survived by her father, Henry Silverman, and by her two children.

== Literary career ==
Rebibo began writing in Hebrew while studying Hebrew language and literature at Hebrew College. Dozens of her poems appeared in Israel's major newspapers and journals. An anthology of Israeli writers of English included several of her poems and the journal, Iton 77, featured her Hebrew poem, Etzb'a Elohim (God's finger).

My Beautiful Ballooning Heart

Janice Silverman Rebibo's first collection of poetry in English, My Beautiful Ballooning Heart, was published in July, 2013. How Many Edens, Rebibo's most recent poetry chapbook, was published in April 2014

Using allusions, humor and eroticism, much of Rebibo's poetry shows how relationships are shaped by language, culture, religion, and politics. Her first Hebrew poems appeared in 1984 in the literary supplement of the Hebrew language newspaper Davar on the recommendation of Israeli poet Haim Gouri. Her poems and short stories appeared frequently in Israel's literary pages and journals and her four books of Hebrew poetry have been published. Zara in Zion: Collected Poems 1984-2006 by Janice Rebibo, published in 2007, includes Hebrew poetry from her three earlier books and new work previously published in Israel's literary journals, as well as a chapter entitled Zion by Itself containing poems Rebibo has written in English. Rebibo translated Hebrew poetry into English, notably for poet Natan Yonatan. Her poems have been set to music and recorded. Hazman Ozel (time is running out), music by Gidi Koren, was released in 2009 by NMC on a live performance DVD by The Brothers and The Sisters. She collaborated with composers on texts and librettos. Here Comes Messiah!, a monodrama for soprano and chamber orchestra by Matti Kovler, libretto by Janice Silverman Rebibo and Matti Kovler, was premiered at Carnegie Hall with soprano, Tehila Nini Goldstein, on May 9, 2009.

Rebibo edited and translated prose for novelist Yizhar Smilansky, Toronto filmmaker Avi Lev, Prof Moshe Bar-Asher at the Academy of the Hebrew Language, and others. Rebibo directed an innovative school-pairing program to promote tolerance, friendship, and cooperation in Israeli society and serves as SPO at a non-profit for the advancement of Hebrew language teaching and learning in North America.

== Published works ==
The first of her four poetry collections, Zara (a stranger-woman, referring to the figure in Proverbs), was published in 1997. She later served as chief translator for Natan Yonatan, completing Within the Song to Live, his bilingual volume of selected work, following that popular poet’s death in 2004.

Zara Betzion: shirim 1984-2006, a blend of two literary traditions, received a President of Israel Award and other prizes. Her poems have been set to music by composer, Gidi Koren. In addition to the English libretto for composer Matti Kovler's The Escape of Jonah, Rebibo also collaborated with Kovler to write the libretto for Here Comes Messiah!, performed at Carnegie Hall in 2009 and at Boston's Jordan Hall in 2010.

== Literary style ==
Rebibo's poetry has been described as having “a new strength and the kind of courage that comprises a strategic breakthrough, a stance of both audacity and humor that adds something new to the war of independence of Israel's consciousness – a revolution of language, spirit and mind”, according to critic Menahem Ben.

== Awards and recognition ==
Zara Betzion ("A Stranger in Zion") by Janice Rebibo received awards from the Office of the President of Israel and the Mifal HaPayis Cultural Committee, as well as Hebrew College's Steiner Prize in Hebrew Literature, one of several academic and literary prizes awarded to Rebibo over her many years of association with that College.

== See also ==
- Hebrew literature
