= Amos Bar =

Israeli author, teacher, and editor

- עמוס בר
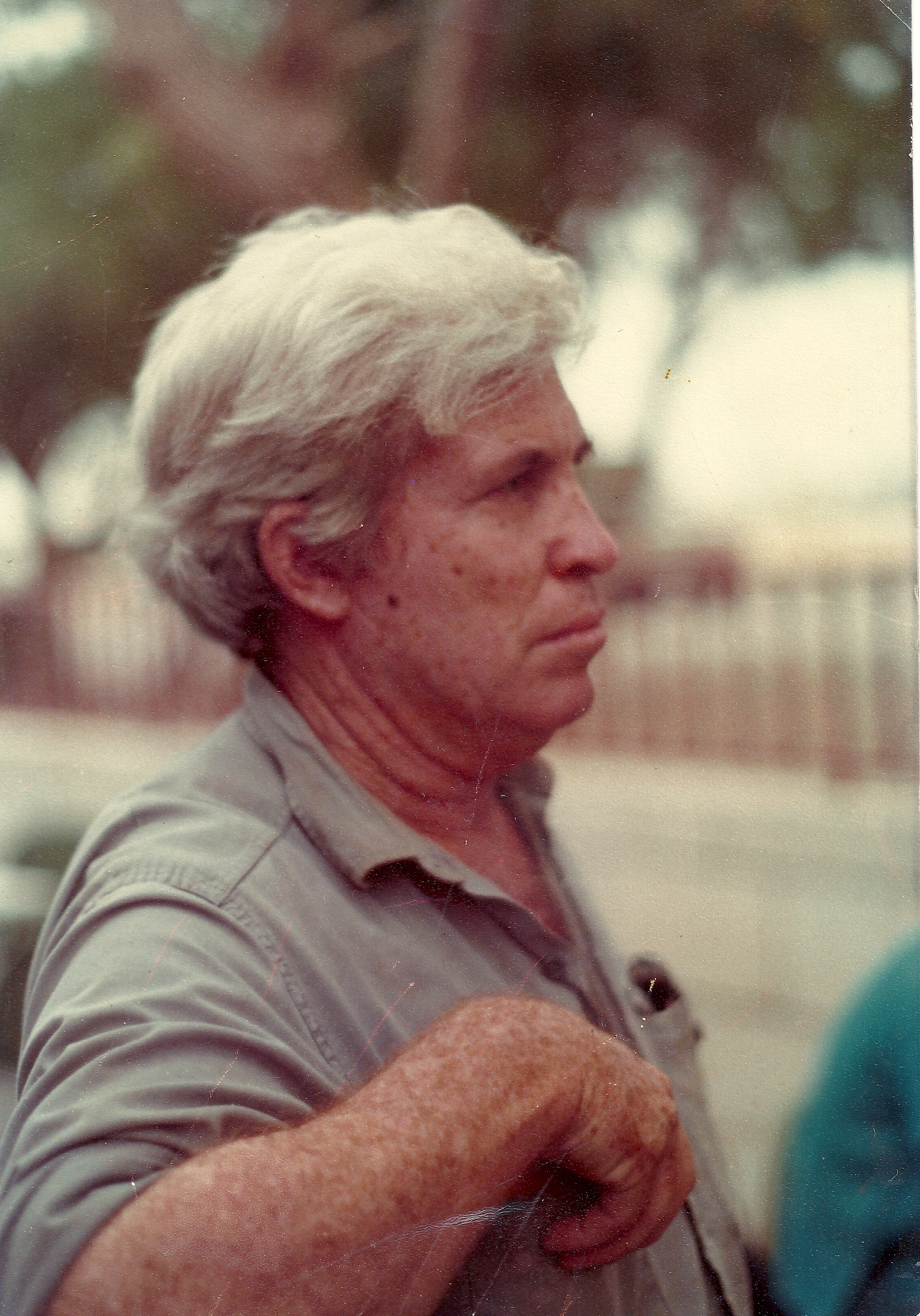
- Amos Bar, 1980
- Born: Amos Barber; October 15, 1931; Tel Adashim, Palestine
- Died: March 15, 2011 (aged 79); Israel
- Occupations: Writer, lecturer, teacher, editor
- Writing career
- Pen name: Possah, Amos Bar
- Genres: children's literature, young adult fiction, non-fiction, education fiction, historical fiction, historical romance
- Notable works: Chief editor, children magazine Pashosh (Hebrew: עיתון פשוש) by SPNI, The Poet of Sea of Galilee (Hebrew: המשוררת מכנרת, HaMeshoreret MeKineret),Legend Flowers (Hebrew: פרחי אגדה, PirHai HaGadah),Legend Birds (Hebrew: צפורי אגדה, Tziporei HaGadah),Legend Land (Hebrew: ארץ אגדה, Eretz HaGadah)

Signature
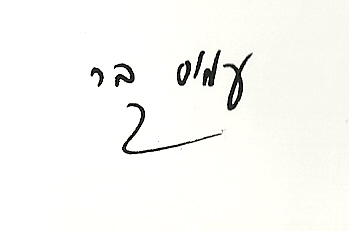

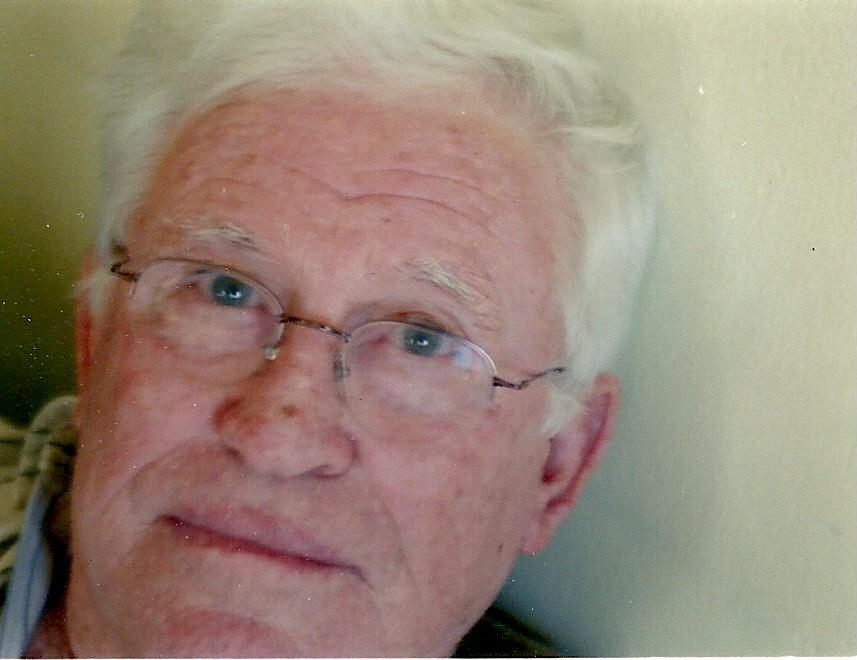
Amos Bar

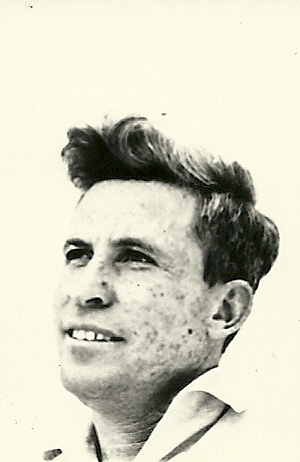
Amos Bar, 1958

Amos Bar (Hebrew: עמוס בר; October 15, 1931 – March 15, 2011), also known as "Possa", was an Israeli author, teacher, and editor. Most of his books are for children and young adults.

== Biography ==
Amos Bar was born to Sarah and Pinhas Barber in moshav Tel Adashim, in the Jezreel Valley, Mandatory Palestine. At age 9, his family relocated to Tel Aviv. His early life experiences are richly interlaced in his books. After graduating from high school in Tel Aviv, he enlisted in the IDF and served in Nahlayim Mul Aza ("Nahal soldiers opposite Gaza"), the country's first Nahal settlement, which later became kibbutz Nahal Oz. In 1951, he joined Kibbutz Revivim in the Negev. His first book The Little Tractor Driver was written in 1958, following his experiences as a farmer in the kibbutz fields. He continued to publish numerous children's books, stories and children's magazines, radio plays and teleplays for children on radio and television. After graduating from the kibbutz seminary college and from Tel Aviv University, he was a teacher and an educator for many years.

In 1978, he assumed the editor-in-chief role of "Pashosh", a nature magazine for children published by the Society for the Protection of Nature in Israel, and remained its editor for 24 years. He also served as the editor of children's books in publishing houses: Schocken Books, Hakibbutz Hameuchad -Sifriat Poalim Publishing Group, and Kinneret Zmora-Bitan Dvir. Throughout the last two decades of his life he lived with his family in an Israeli community village, and held educational sessions with children and teenagers throughout Israel.

Amos Bar (Possah) died on March 15, 2011. He was the father of six and grandfather of four.

== His work ==
Amos Bar's books are inspired by his childhood experiences in the Land of Israel, its landscapes, and animals. His writing is characterized by a personal, smiling, and rogue style – seasoned with nostalgia and optimism. His strong affection for his characters is highly apparent in his books:

"Sometimes, early in the morning, for the sound of birdsong, I go back to the days of my childhood, seeing the sights of the world through the eyes of a child, hearing the sounds with child ears, and feeling everything with a child's heart. I instantly empathize with everything I tell about, from a tree and a flower to a bird, a deer or a dwarf; while writing I see them alive and perform tricks, hear them talk as human beings, and there is nothing I can do but write or tell what I see and feel ", described Amos his work process. "My childhood stories are written quickly and without difficulty. I simply remember clearly what happened to since I started to walk."

== Awards ==
- In 1972, his book "I'm Running out of The Horse" was included in the list of honor of Hans Christian Andersen Award.
- In 1978, he won the Lamdan Prize for his book "Poretz Ha-Machsomim" ("Blockade Runner"), Sreberk, 1977.
- In 1993, he won the Ze'ev Award for his work "HaMeshoreret MeKineret''" ("The Poet of Sea of Galilee").

== Books ==
- The Little Tractor Driver (Hebrew: הטרקטוראי הקטן, Hatractora'i Hakatan, 1958)
- Fishing Fish (Hebrew: דגים דגים, DaGeem DaGeem, 1961)
- Rotem and the Magic Hair (Hebrew: רותם ושערת הקסמים, Rotem Vese'arat Hak'samim, 1961) – written for his oldest daughter's birthday
- The Legend of the Awakening Sea (Hebrew: אגדת הים המתעורר, Agadat Hayam Hamit'orer, 1963)
- The Ants Hill (Hebrew: גבעת הנמלים, Giv'at Hanemalim, 1967)
- I'm Running out of The Horse (Hebrew: נגמר לי הסוס, Nigmar Li Hasus, 1972)
- Dews in the Negev (Hebrew: טללים בנגב, Tlalim BaNegev, 1972)
- The Tales of TomerOdedana (Hebrew: עלילות תומרודדנה, Halilot TomerOdedana, 1975)
- Blockade Runner (Hebrew: פורץ המחסומים, Poretz Hama'hsomim, 1972) "פורץ המחסומים". Archived from the original on July 18, 2011. (Hebrew)
- The Negev Patrol (Hebrew: סיירת הנגב, Sayeret HaNegev, 1978)
- The rebellion at the Zoo (Hebrew: המרד בפינת החי, Ha'mered Be'pinat He'hai, 1979)
- Burning Ship at Tel-Aviv shore (Hebrew: אניה בוערת בחוף תל אביב, Oniya Bo'eret Be'hof Tel Aviv, 1980)
- Stories about Birds (Hebrew: סיפורים על ציפורים, Sipurim Al Tziporim, 1983)
- The Jumping Champion and the Car Counter(Hebrew: אלוף הקפיצות וסופר המכוניות, Aluf Hak'fitzot Vesofer Hame'honiyot, 1988)
- The Poet of Sea of Galilee (Hebrew: המשוררת מכנרת, Hameshoreret MeiKineret, 1983) – included in Israel's Ministry of Education Reading Recommndation List of 2010–11.
- First 100 trips (Hebrew: 100 טיולים ראשונים, Me'ah Tiyulim Rishonim, 1986)
- One Dog, Two kids, Three chicks(Hebrew: כלב אחד, שני ילדים, שלושה אפרוחים, Kelev E'had, Shnei Yeladim, Sheloshah Efro'him, 1996)
- Legend Flowers (Hebrew: פרחי אגדה, Pirhei Agadah, 1995)
- Legend Birds (Hebrew: ציפורי אגדה, Tziporei Agadah, 1997)
- Legend Land (Hebrew: ארץ אגדה, Eretz Agadah, 1997)
- Where Have You Come From, Pretty Butterfly? (Hebrew: מנין באת פרפר יפה?, Me'na'yin Ba'ta, Parpar Yafe?, 1999)
- Where Have You Come From, Cute Bunny? (Hebrew: איך באת לעולם, ארנבון נחמד?, Ei'h Ba'ta La'olam, Arnavon Nehmad?, 2000)

== Editorial works ==
- Pashosh Children Magazineעיתון פשוש (Hebrew: עיתון פשוש, Pashosh) (by SPNI – Chief editor for 24 years
- They See, but Can't Be Seen by Pinhas Amitay (Hebrew: הרואים ואינם נראים, HaRo'eem Ve Einam Nireem, 1983)
- Adventures with Plants by Pinhas Amitay (Hebrew: הרפתקאות עם צמחים, HarPatka'ot Eem TzmaHeem, 1983)
- Insects at Home and in the Garden by Pinhas Amitay (Hebrew: חרקים בבית ובחצר, HaRakeem Baba'eet Ve Ba'Hatzer, 1983)

== Translation works ==
- Spot's Birthday (Hebrew) by Eric Hill, translated and edited by Amos Bar (Hebrew: יום הולדת לפינוקי, Yom Hooledet Le Pinookee, 1984)
- Spot's Noisy Walk (Hebrew) by Eric Hill, translated and edited by Amos Bar (Hebrew: פינוקי יוצא לטיול, Pinookee Yotzeh Le Tiyool, 1984)
