= Lamdan Prize =

Literary award

- Awarded for: Awarded for literary works
- Country: Israel
- Presented by: Ramat Gan Municipality in conjunction with the Hebrew Writers Association in Israel
- First award: 1954; 72 years ago

The Lamdan Prize was an Israeli prize awarded annually, from 1954 to 1983, for literary works for children and youth.

The prize was presented by the Ramat Gan Municipality in conjunction with the Hebrew Writers Association in Israel and was founded in the name of the Israeli poet and author Yitzhak Lamdan, shortly following his death.

== Recipients ==
- Amos Bar
- Nachum Gutman
- Rivka Keren
- Levin Kipnis
- Uriel Ofek
- Dorit Orgad (1981)
- Dvora Omer
- S. Yizhar
- Natan Yonatan
