= Dvora Omer =

Israeli writer

- דבורה עומר
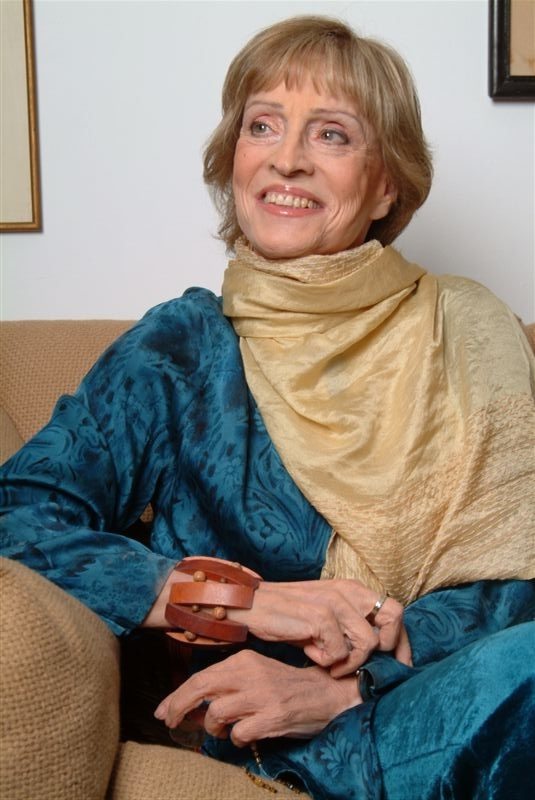
- Born: Dvora Mosenzon; October 9, 1932; Kibbutz Ma'oz Haim, Palestine Mandate
- Died: May 2, 2013 (aged 80); Kfar Ma'as, Israel
- Spouse(s): Shmuel Omer; 3 children
- Writing career
- Notable work: Ani Etgaber
- Notable awards: 1968 Lamdan Prize, for children's literature; 2006 Israel Prize, for lifetime achievement and special contribution to society and the State

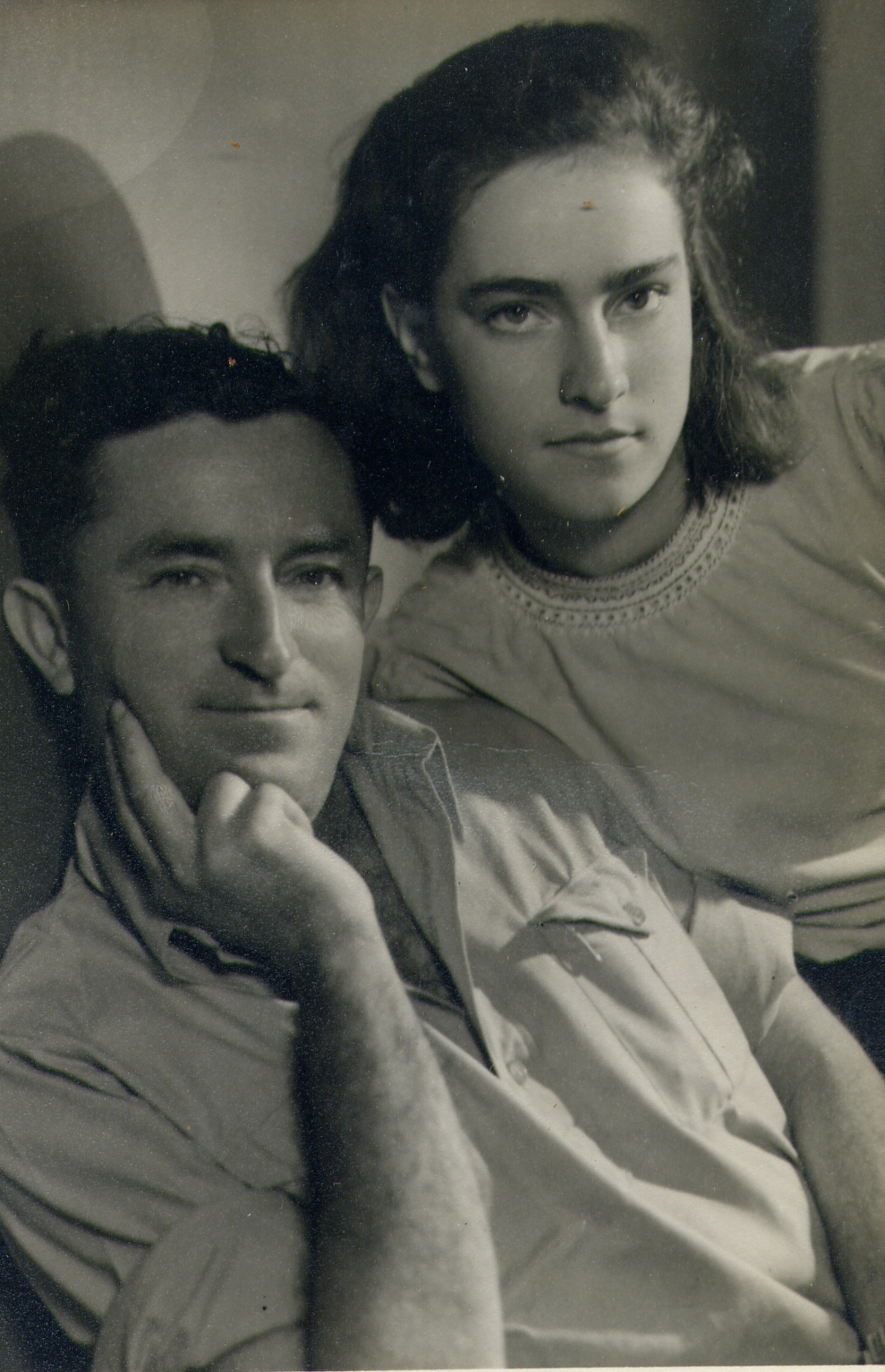
Dvora Omer in her youth with her father, Israeli newspaper editor Moshe Mosenzon

Dvora Omer (Hebrew: דבורה עומר; October 9, 1932 – May 2, 2013) was an Israeli children's book author. She is considered one of Israel’s greatest children’s book writers.

== Biography ==
Dvora Omer was born on Kibbutz Ma'oz Haim in the Beit She'an Valley. Her parents divorced when she was a child. When she was 11 years old, her mother was killed in a training accident in the Haganah, a pre-state military organization. Her father, Moshe Mosenzon, was a newspaper editor who served in the Jewish Brigade. As a young girl she published her writings in the youth journal Bama’aleh edited by her father. Upon completing her military service, she studied at Oranim Teachers College. Before dedicating her career to writing, Omer worked a few years as a school teacher in the Kibbutz.

Dvora married Shmuel Omer, with whom she had three children, including Ron Omer and Gil Omer. She died on May 2, 2013, aged 80, at Kfar Ma'as.

Omer's sister, Vered Mosinson, is also a published writer.

== Literary career ==
Omer began writing while she was a teacher, and continued with many books that reflect the developing state and culture of Israel. Most of her books are for young adults, and have been translated into many languages.

== Awards and recognition ==
- In 1968, Omer was awarded the Lamdan Prize, for children's literature.
- In 1979, she was awarded the Prime Minister's Prize for Hebrew Literary Works.
- In 2006, she was awarded the Israel Prize, for her lifetime achievement and special contribution to society and the State.

== See also ==
- List of Israel Prize recipients
- Hebrew literature
- Culture of Israel
