= Natan Yonatan =

Israeli poet (1923–2004)

Nathan Yonathan
- נָתָן יֹונָתָן
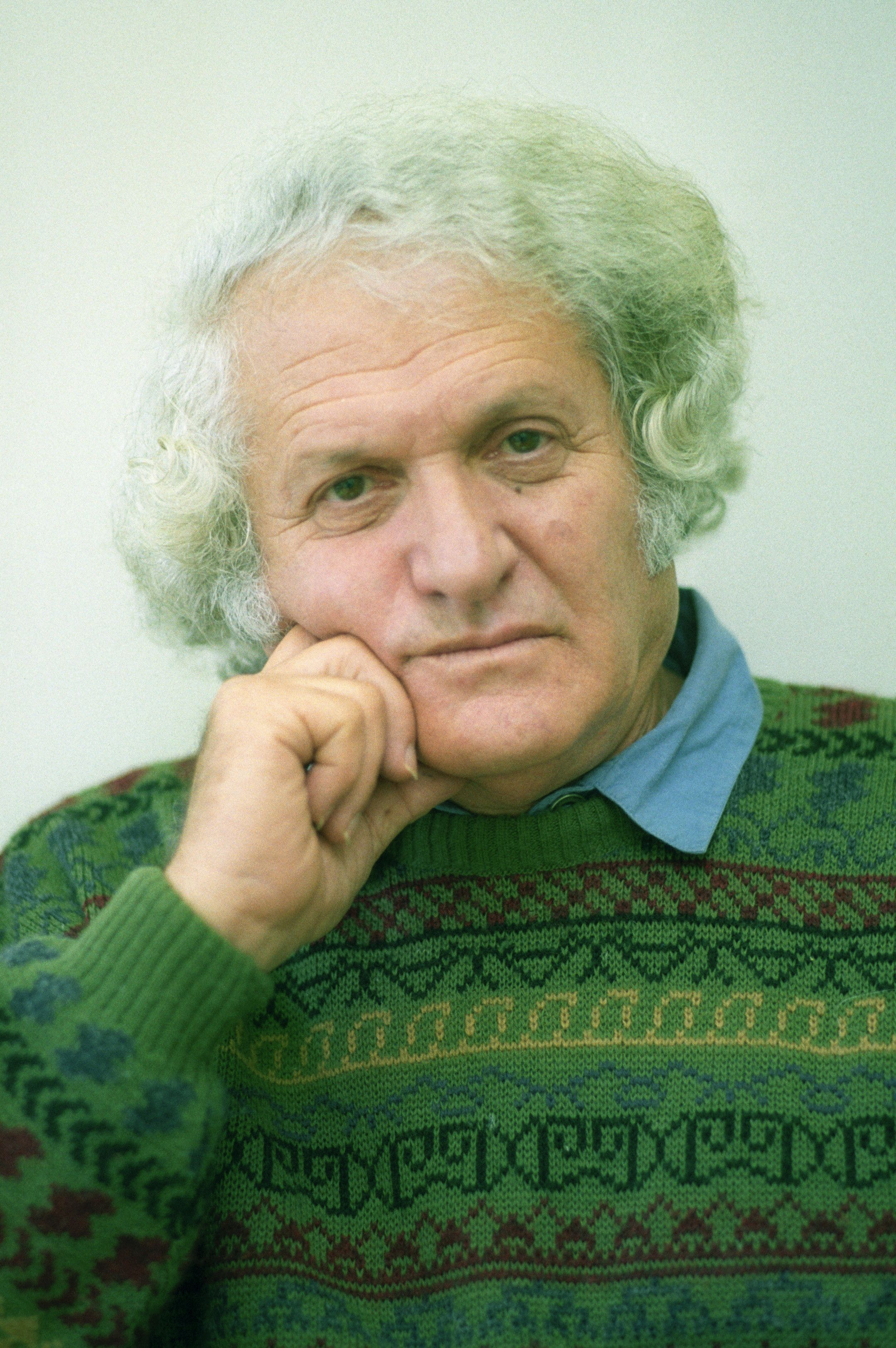
- Nathan Yonathan
- Born: Nathan Klein; September 20, 1923; Kiev, Ukraine
- Died: March 12, 2004 (aged 80)
- Education: Hebrew University of Jerusalem, Tel Aviv University, and Oxford University
- Occupation: Poet
- Spouse(s): 1) Tzefira; 2) Nili
- Writing career
- Notable awards: 1946 Bialik Prize for literature; 1960 Lamdan Prize for children's literature

Nathan Yonathan (Hebrew: נָתָן יֹונָתָן; 20 September 1923 – 12 March 2004) was an Israeli poet.

His poems have been translated from Hebrew and published in more than a dozen languages, among them: Arabic, Bulgarian, Chinese, Dutch, English, French, German, Portuguese, Russian, Spanish, Vietnamese, and Yiddish.

== Biography ==
Natan Yonatan was born Nathan Klein, in Kiev in Ukraine in 1923. In 1925, his family immigrated to Mandate Palestine. They were among the early settlers (1935), of Kfar Ma'as, an agricultural village near Petah Tikva.

Yonatan was active in the Hashomer Hatzair youth movement and in 1945 joined kibbutz Sarid in the Jezreel Valley. He was a member of Sarid for 46 years. From 1991 until his death, he resided in the suburbs of Tel Aviv.

He fathered two sons with his first wife Tzefira: Lior—who fell in action in the Yom Kippur War at age 21—and Ziv, musician, composer and radio producer. Natan Yonatan was also father to his second wife Nili's daughter and grandson: Netta and Tom. While love and passion, as well as the Israeli landscape, permeate his work, the authenticity of Yonatan's poems mourning the loss of Lior – the terrible price of war – became this poet's hallmark.

He held degrees in Hebrew Literature and Comparative Literature from the Hebrew University of Jerusalem, Tel Aviv University and Oxford University. He lectured internationally, as well as within the Israeli public school system. One of Israel's most eminent teachers of creative writing, he was known for his generous spirit and desire to foster new poetic talent.

While serving as long-term Editor-in-Chief of the Sifriat Poalim publishing house, he was also the unanimously elected President of the Hebrew Writers Union and represented Israel at literary conferences around the globe.

== Awards ==
- 1946 – the Bialik Prize for literature
- 1960 – the Lamdan Prize for children's literature
- 1975 – the Prime Minister's Prize for Hebrew Literary Works
- 1979 – the Kugel Prize awarded by the Municipality of Holon

== Works ==
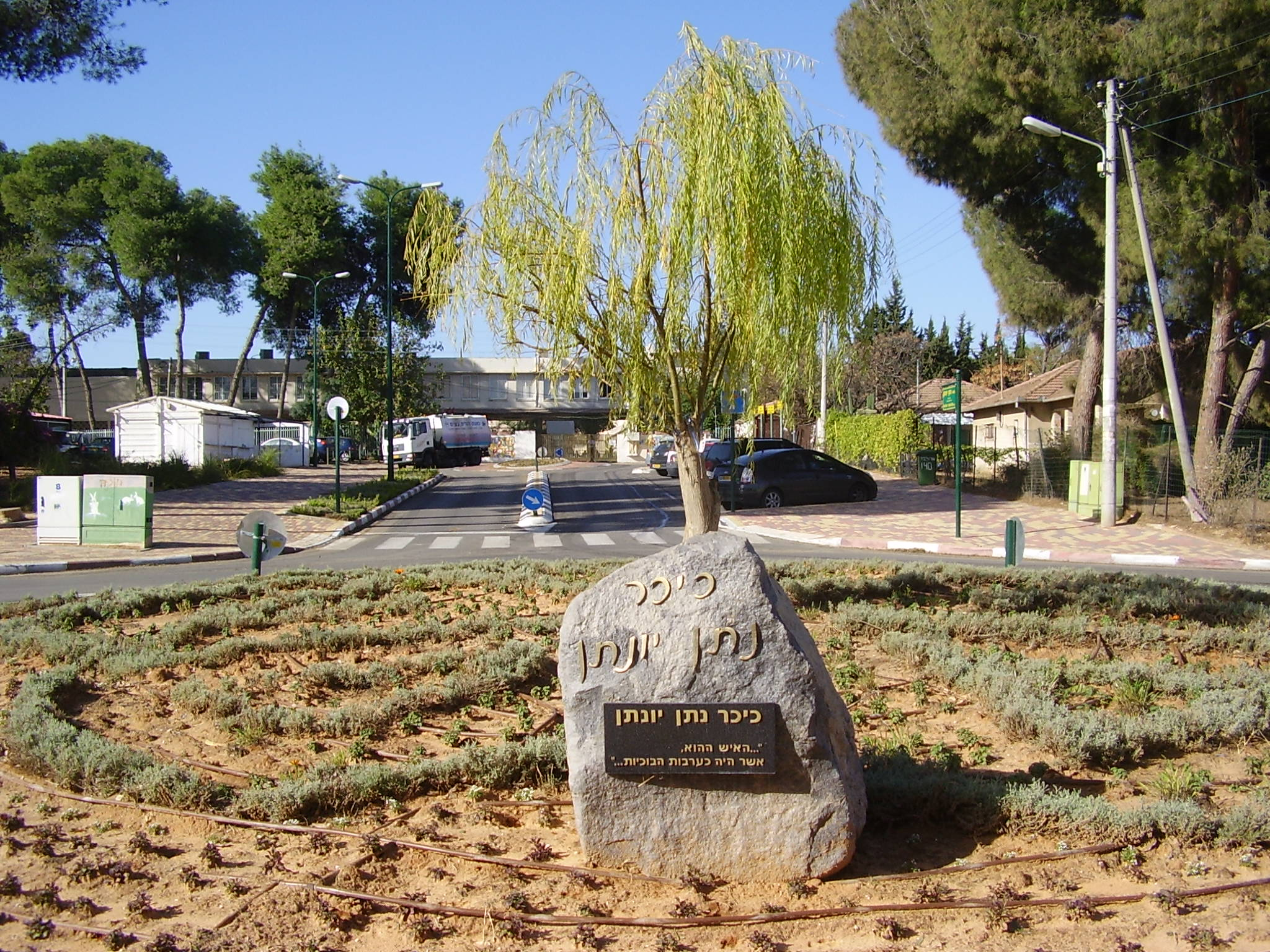
Natan Yonatan Square, in Yehud, Israel

Yonatan published his first poem, “When Ships Put Out to Sea”, during the Second World War, in 1940 at age 16 before the establishment of the State of Israel, and soon became one of modern Israel's most read and beloved poets. Notwithstanding the subtle complexity of his use of Hebrew's many registers and intertexts, Yonatan's lyricism lends itself to musical composition. Dozens of his poems have become traditional favorites, set to music by Israel's foremost songwriters and composers. Yonatan's poems are sung and broadcast for national occasions, both festive and mournful.

=== Writings; books ===
- Dusty Paths (poems), Sifriat Poalim, 1951
- To the Fallow Land (poems for children), Sifriat Poalim, 1954
- Once We Loved (poems), Sifriat Poalim, 1957
- Between Spring and a Cloud (stories for teens), Sifriat Poalim, 1959
- Once-Loved Dusty Paths (selected poems), Sifriat Poalim, 1960
- Poems Along the Shore (poems), Sifriat Poalim, 1962
- Lilac (stories for children), Sifriat Poalim, 1963
- Poems of Dust and Wind (poems for teens), Sifriat Poalim, 1965
- Till the End of Indian Summer (American travelogue), Sifriat Poalim, 1968
- Poems at Sea-Dusk (poems), Sifriat Poalim, 1970
- More Stories Between Spring and a Cloud (stories for teens), Sifriat Poalim, 1971
- Poems (Dedicated to Lior) (poems), Sifriat Poalim, 1974
- Stones in the Darkness (selected poems translated into English, trans. Richard Flantz and others), Sifriat Poalim, 1975
- Poems This Far (poems), Sifriat Poalim, 1979 Salt and Light (selected poems translated into Russian), Sifriat Poalim, 1980
- Pocket Collection (selections from 40 years of poetry), Hakibbutz Hameuchad, 1982
- Shores (100 poems set to music, including both words and musical notation), Keter, 1983
- Other Poems (poems), Sifriat Poalim, 1984
- Itzik Manger—Selected Poems (translations from Yiddish to Hebrew), Keter, 1987
- Poems on the Mountain Ranges (poems), Zmora-Bitan, 1988
- Poems with Love (collected love poems), Sifriat Poalim, 1990
- Poems on Earth and Water (collected poems about the land), Sifriat Poalim, 1993
- Veiled Faced is Time (poems), Sifriat Poalim, 1995
- Salt and Light (selected poems translated into Bulgarian), Sifriat Poalim, 1995
- Poetry’s Grace (collected poems on the art of poetry), Sifriat Poalim, 1996
- Gleanings and Forgotten Sheaves (selected poems), Sifriat Poalim, 1997
- Poems on “Sefer Hayashar” (poems inspired by the Bible and other traditional Jewish sources, with landscape photography), Or-Am, 1998
- Poems Cloaked in Evening (poetry anthology selected and edited by Natan Yonatan, published two days after his death), Yediot Ahronot, 2004.
- Within the Song to Live (Hebrew-English anthology, trans. Janice Silverman Rebibo and others, music CD, composer: Gidi Koren, performed by The Brothers and the Sisters), Gefen Jerusalem & NY, 2005. ISBN 965-229-345-8
