= Efraim Sicher =

Israeli literary scholar

Efraim Sicher (Hebrew: אפרים שיכר) is an Israeli literary scholar. He obtained his PhD at Oxford University and taught at Ben-Gurion University of the Negev until his retirement in 2022. Among his investigations of narrative and memory, he has written on modern Jewish culture and Holocaust literature. He is the author of numerous books and article on the Russian Jewish writer Isaac Babel. He edited the Penguin Classics edition of Babel's short story collection Red Cavalry. His work on postmodern Jewish writers includes the controversial Reenvisoning Jewish Identities: Reflections on Contemporary Culture in Israel and the Diaspora (2021) and Postmodern Love: Negotiating Jewish Identites and Spaces (2022), which challenged the consensus of separate cultures in Israel and America and pointed to the blurring of boundaries of gender, sexual, and ethnic identies in a breakdown of "Jewishness" and an erosion of history.

== Selected works ==
- The Holocaust Novel
- Race, Color, Identity: Rethinking Discourses about 'Jews' in the Twenty-First Century (editor)
- Breaking Crystal: Writing and Memory after Auschwitz (editor)
- Rereading the City/Rereading Dickens: Representation, the Novel, and Urban Realism
- Style And Structure In The Prose Of Isaak Babel
- Jews in Russian Literature After the October Revolution
- Under Postcolonial Eyes: Figuring the "Jew" in Contemporary British Writing (with Linda Weinhouse)
- Holocaust Novelists (Dictionary of Literary Biography vol. 299)
- Beyond Marginality: Anglo-Jewish Literature After the Holocaust
- The Jew's Daughter: A Cultural History of a Conversion Narrative
- Babel' in Context: A Study in Cultural Identity
