= List of Hebrew-language authors =

This is a list of Hebrew-language authors:

== A ==
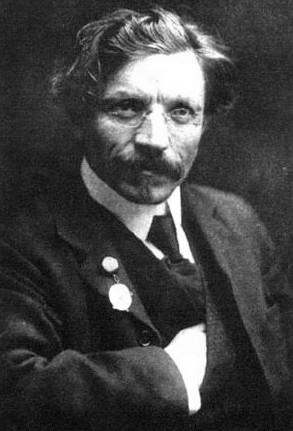
Sholem Aleichem

- Shimon Adaf
- Tamar Adar
- Uri Adelman
- Shimon Agassi
- Shmuel Yosef Agnon (winner of the Nobel prize for literature in 1966)
- Lea Aini
- Miriam Akavia
- Sholem Aleichem
- Gila Almagor
- Nisim Aloni
- Shulamit Aloni
- Udi Aloni
- Nathan Alterman
- Mor Altshuler
- Yehuda Amichai
- Aharon Amir
- Eli Amir
- Aharon Appelfeld
- Naim Araidi
- Dan Armon
- David Avidan
- Yemima Avidar-Tchernovitz
- Yossi Avni-Levy
- Shay K. Azoulay

== B ==
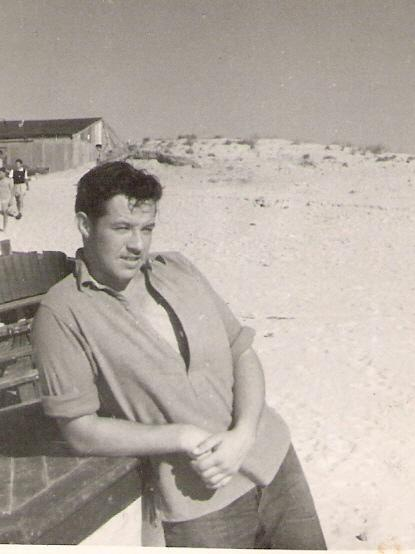
Dahn Ben-Amotz

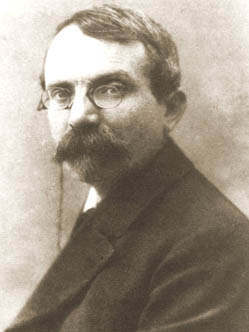
Micha Josef Berdyczewski

- Amos Bar
- Nir Baram
- Hanoch Bartov
- Yocheved Bat-Miriam
- Haim Be`er
- Maya Bejerano
- Menahem Ben
- Dahn Ben-Amotz
- Netiva Ben-Yehuda
- Avraham Ben-Yitzhak
- Reuven Ben-Yosef
- Micha Josef Berdyczewski
- Isaac Dov Berkowitz
- Haim Nachman Bialik
- Erez Biton
- Yaakov Blau
- Rachel Bluwstein
- Shani Boianjiu
- Reuben Asher Braudes
- Yosef Haim Brenner
- Martin Buber
- Oded Burla
- Yehuda Burla

== C ==
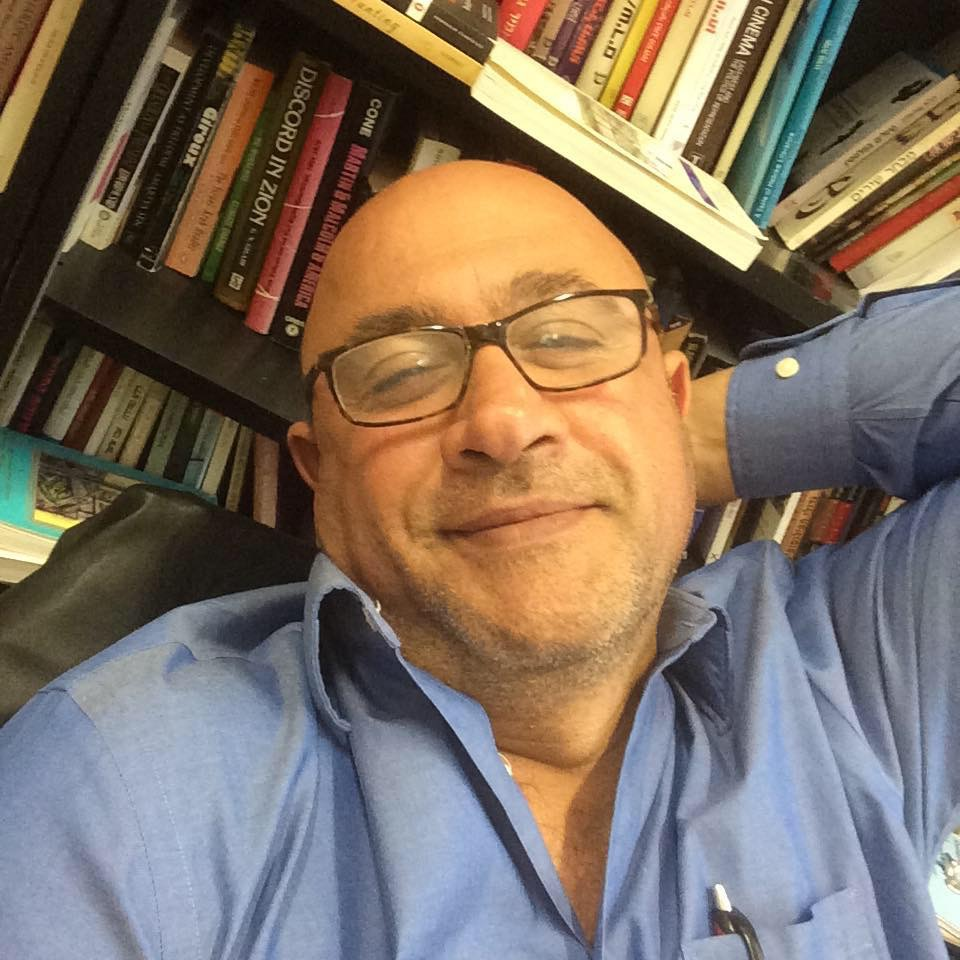
Sami Shalom Chetrit

- T. Carmi
- Orly Castel-Bloom
- Rahel Chalfi
- Sami Shalom Chetrit

== D ==
- Yael Dayan
- Yehiel De-Nur
- Yehiel Dinur
- Ramy Ditzanny

== E ==
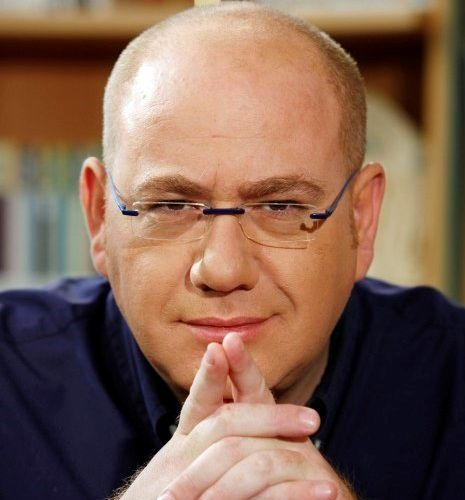
Dov Elbaum

- Dov Elbaum
- Emuna Elon
- Alex Epstein

== F ==
- Jacob Fichman
- Alona Frankel

== G ==
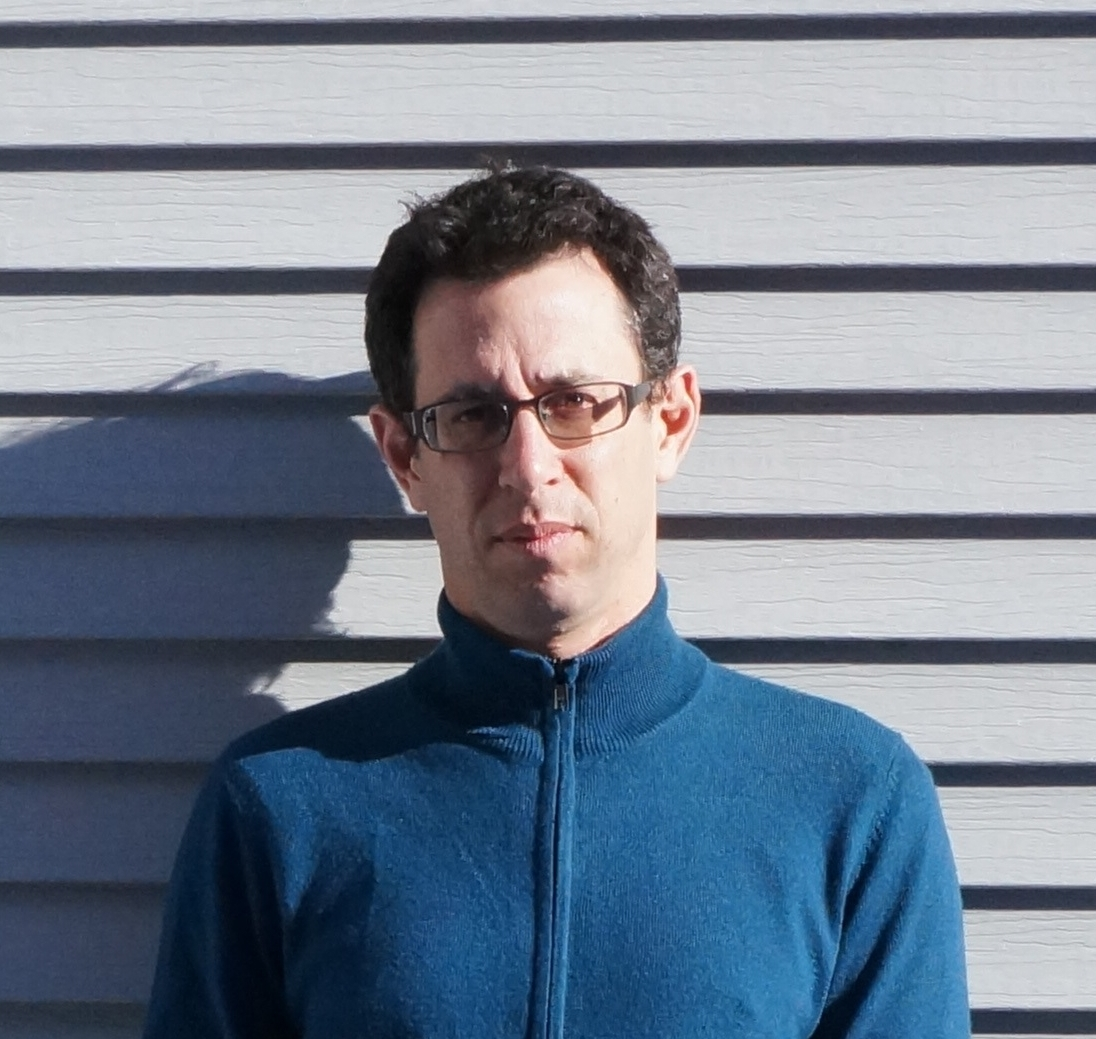
Assaf Gavron

- Naomi Gal
- Assaf Gavron
- Yehonatan Geffen
- Shira Geffen
- Mordechai Geldman
- Zerubavel Gilad
- Amir Gilboa
- Asher Hirsch Ginsberg (Ahad Haam)
- Uri Nissan Gnessin
- Leah Goldberg
- Judah Leib Gordon
- Carine Goren
- Haim Gouri
- Michal Govrin
- Uri Zvi Greenberg (Tur Malka)
- David Grossman
- Batya Gur

== H ==
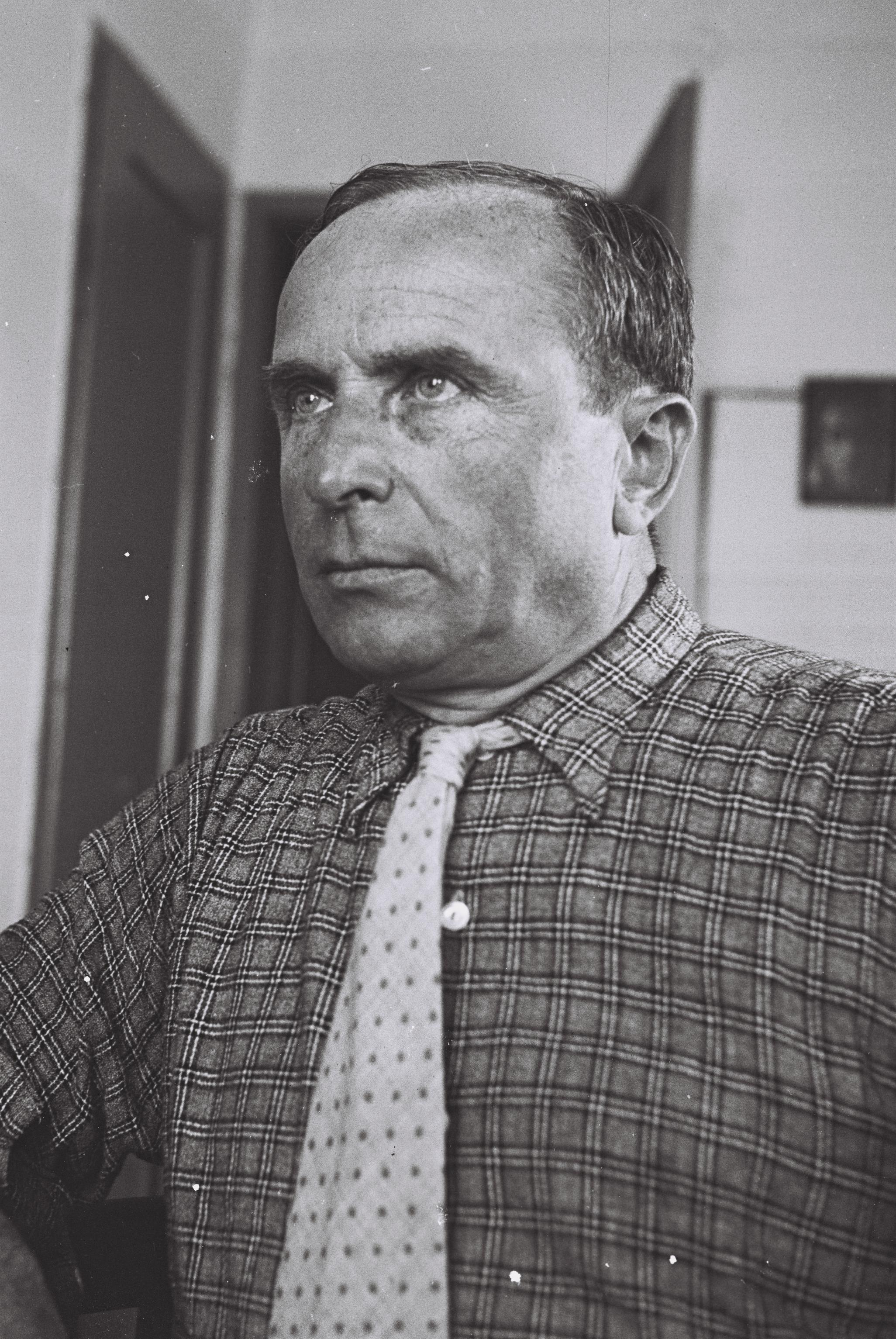
Avigdor Hameiri

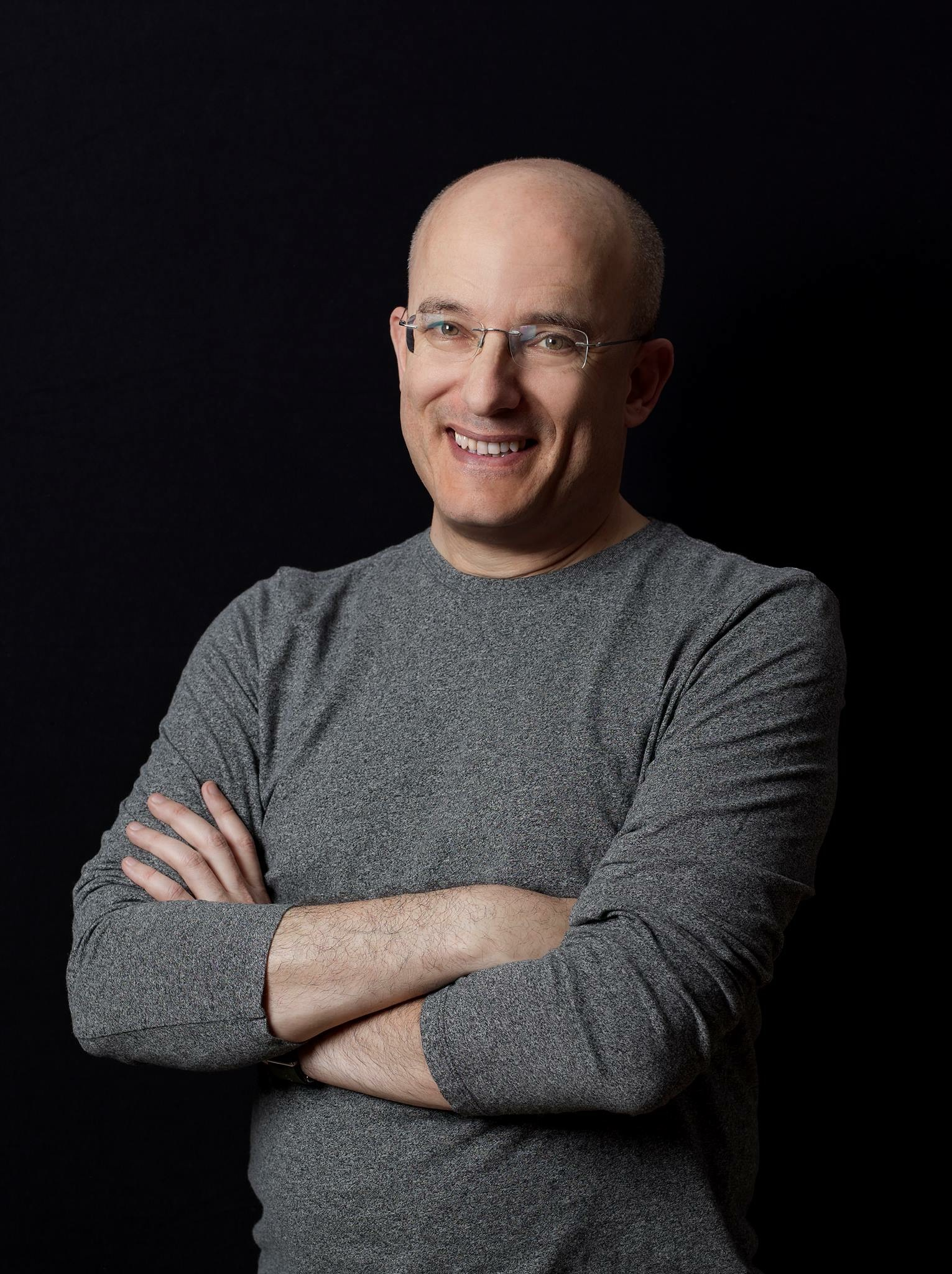
Gil Hovav

- Simon Halkin
- Avigdor Hameiri
- Shulamith Hareven
- Shmuel Hasfari
- Haim Hazaz
- Meshullam Feivush Heller
- Shlomo Herberg
- Abraham Samuel Herschberg
- Dalia Hertz
- Amira Hess
- Ayin Hillel
- Gil Hovav
- Yoel Hoffmann
- Shifra Horn
- Daniel Horowitz
- Yair Hurvitz

== I ==
- Naphtali Herz Imber
- Solomon Ibn Gabirol

== J ==
- Amnon Jacont

== K ==
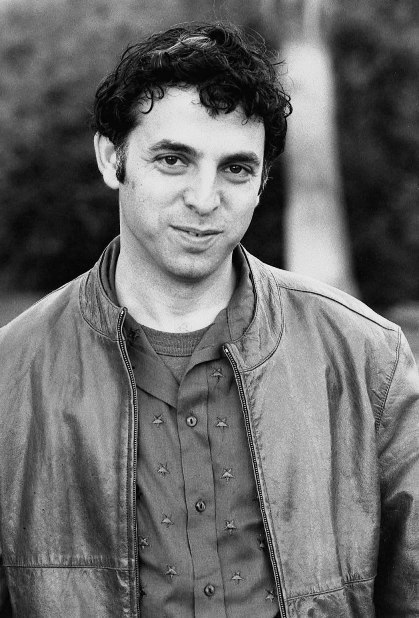
Etgar Keret

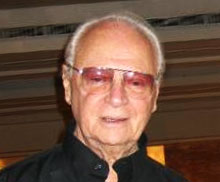
Ephraim Kishon

- Aharon Avraham Kabak
- Yehudit Kafri
- Amalia Kahana-Carmon
- Yoram Kaniuk
- Sayed Kashua
- Shmuel Katz
- Itzhak Katzenelson
- Amos Kenan
- Yehoshua Kenaz
- Rivka Keren
- Etgar Keret
- Alona Kimhi
- Levin Kipnis
- Arthur Koestler (most of work not in Hebrew, but wrote some articles in language)
- Ephraim Kishon
- Admiel Kosman
- Abba Kovner
- Asher Kravitz
- Zundel Kroizer

== L ==
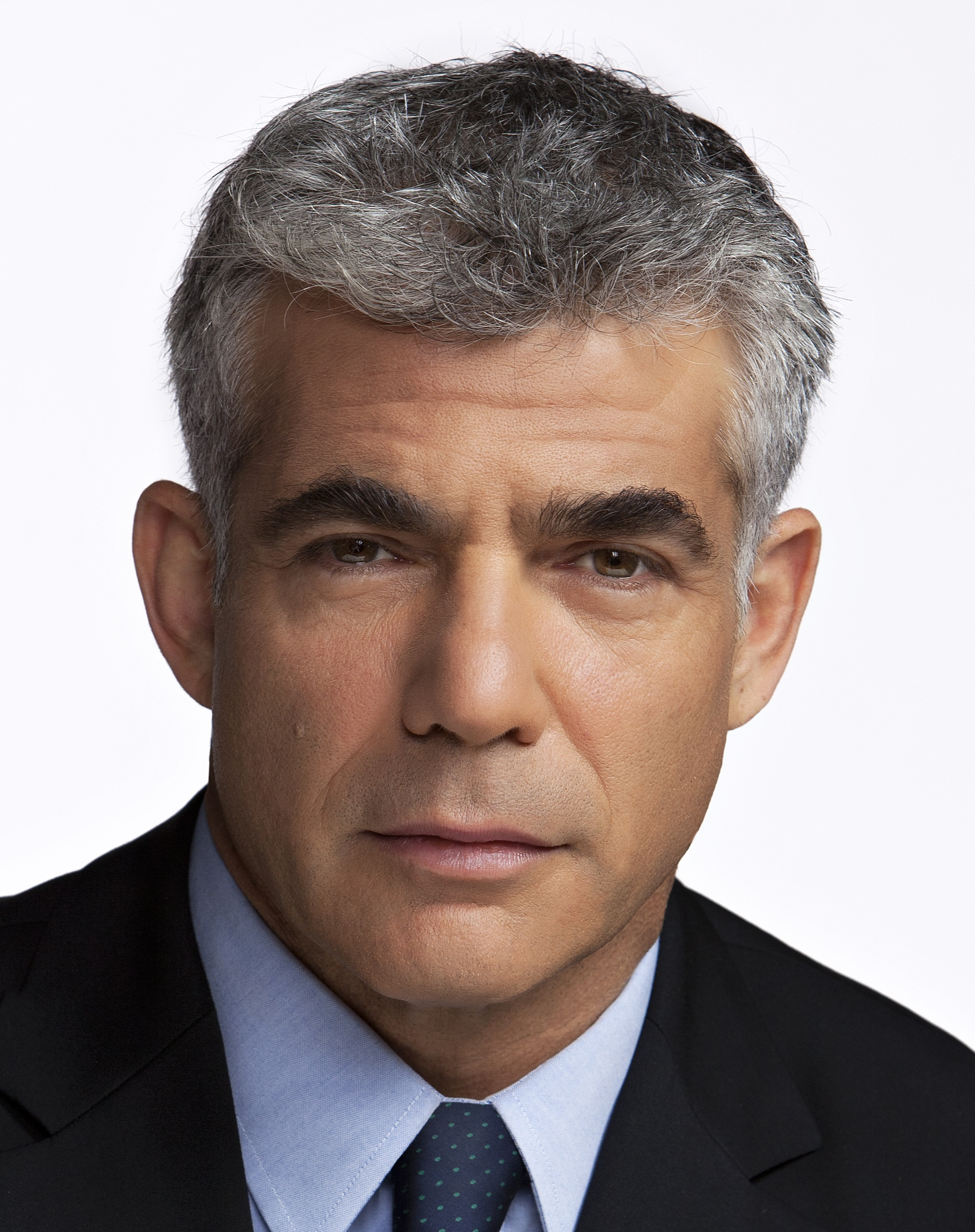
Yair Lapid

- Tsruya Lahav
- Yitzhak Lamdan
- Yitzhak Laor
- Shulamit Lapid
- Yair Lapid
- Micah Joseph Lebensohn
- Haim Lensky
- Motti Lerner
- Ron Leshem
- Hezi Leskali
- Hanoch Levin
- Zvi Lieberman
- Savyon Liebrecht
- Irit Linur

== M ==
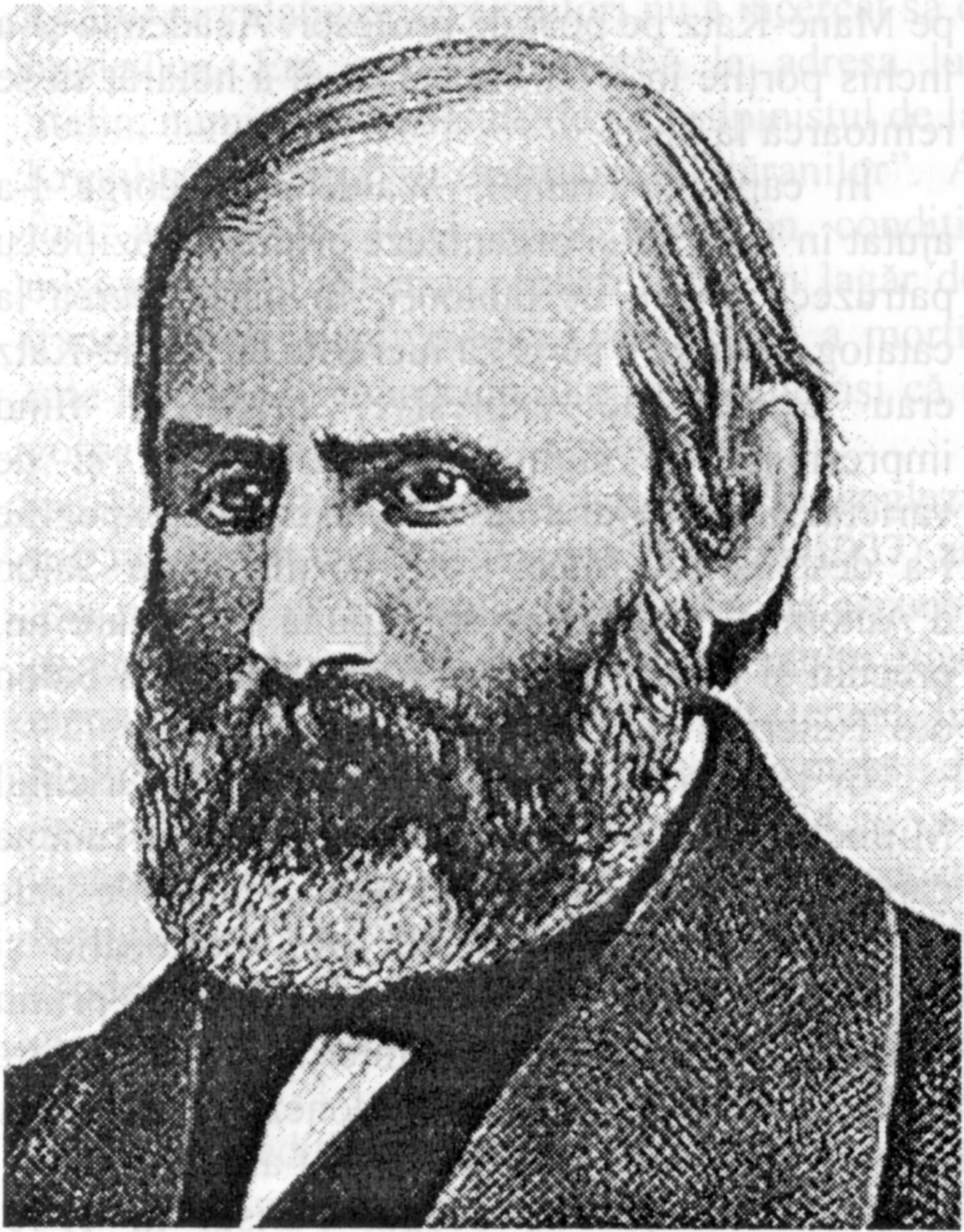
Abraham Mapu

- Abraham Mapu
- Aharon Megged
- Sami Michael
- Agi Mishol
- Mendele Mocher Sefarim
- Igal Mossinsohn
- Josef Mundy

== N ==
- Tamar Fish Nachshon
- Yair Nehorai
- Eshkol Nevo

== O ==
- Aliza Olmert
- Dvora Omer
- Joachim Oppenheim
- Amir Or
- Ram Oren
- Uri Orlev
- Yitzhak Orpaz-Auerbach
- Amos Oz
- Kobi Oz

== P ==
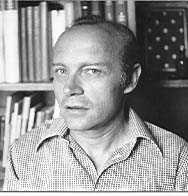
Dan Pagis

- Dan Pagis
- Alexander Penn
- Isaac Loeb Peretz
- Israel Pinkas (Anton)
- Elisha Porat
- Gabriel Preil

== R ==
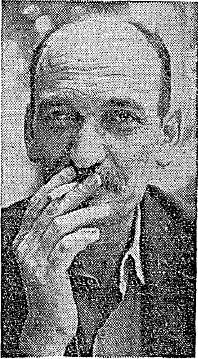
Yonatan Ratosh

- Esther Raab
- Dorit Rabinyan
- Rachel
- Naomi Ragen
- Yonatan Ratosh
- Dahlia Ravikovitch
- Janice Rebibo
- Abraham Regelson
- Galila Ron-Feder Amit
- Roee Rosen
- Miriam Roth
- Yechezkel Roth
- Tuvya Ruebner

== S ==
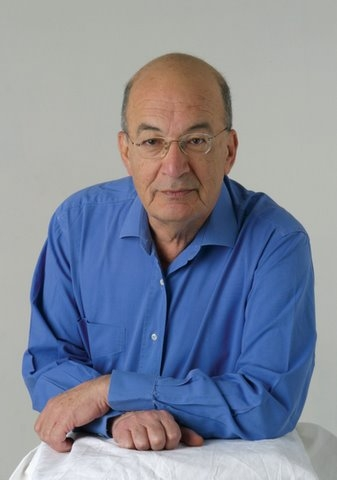
Yossi Sarid

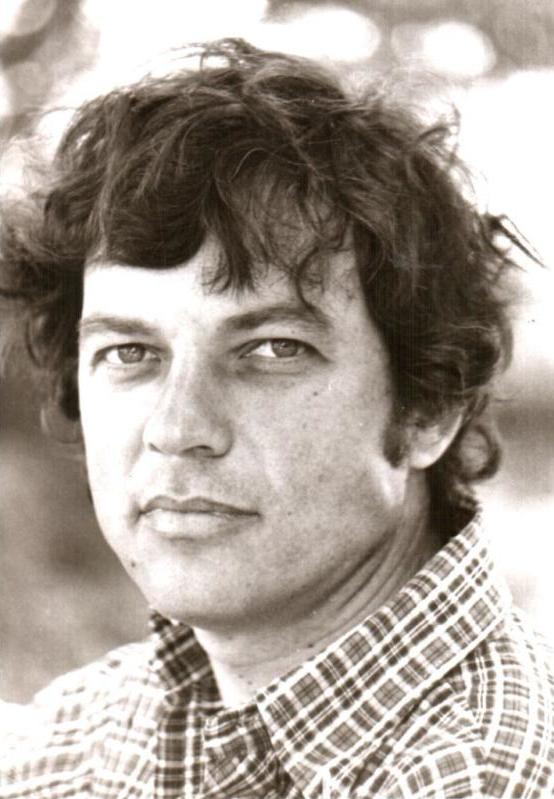
David Schutz

- Rami Saari
- Pinhas Sadeh
- Yossi Sarid
- David Schutz
- Nava Semel
- Aharon Shabtai
- Yaakov Shabtai
- Nathan Shaham
- Gershon Shaked
- Meir Shalev
- Zeruya Shalev
- Yitzhaq Shami
- Moshe Shamir
- Anton Shammas
- Amnon Shamosh
- Chava Shapiro
- Avner Shats
- Ofer Shelach
- Tzur Shezaf
- David Shimoni
- Avraham Shlonsky
- Liad Shoham
- Simha Siani
- Eliezer Smoli
- Zalman Shneur
- Gershon Shufman
- Ephraim Sidon
- Moshe Smilansky
- Peretz Smolenskin
- Eliezer Smoli
- Michal Snunit
- Yehoshua Sobol
- Ronny Someck
- Aharon Sorasky
- Jacob Steinberg
- Eliezer Steinman
- Alexander Süsskind of Grodno

== T ==
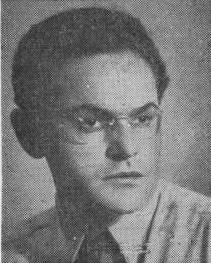
Benjamin Tammuz

- Benjamin Tammuz
- Gadi Taub
- Shaul Tchernichovsky
- Avner Treinin
- Dan Tsalka
- Hayyim Tyrer
- Uri Tzaig

== V ==
- David Vogel

== W ==
- Yona Wallach
- Meir Wieseltier

== Y ==
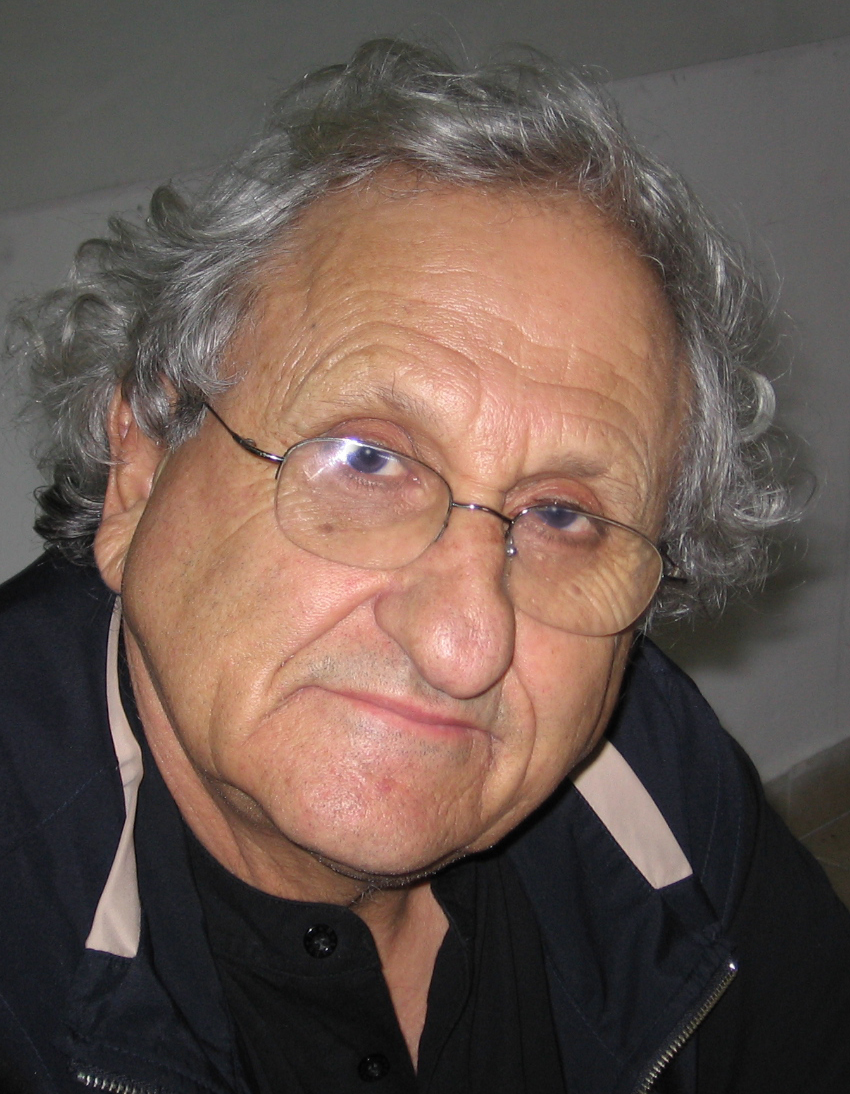
Abraham B. Yehoshua

- Dov Yaffe
- Zvi Yair
- Miriam Yalan-Shteklis
- Abraham B. Yehoshua
- Avoth Yeshurun
- S. Yizhar
- Natan Yonatan

== Z ==
- Natan Zach
- Nurit Zarchi
- Zelda
- Benny Ziffer

== See also ==
- List of Hebrew-language playwrights
- List of Hebrew-language poets
- Culture of Israel
- Category:Hebrew-language playwrights
- Category:Hebrew-language poets
- Category:Hebrew-language writers
