= Israeli literature =

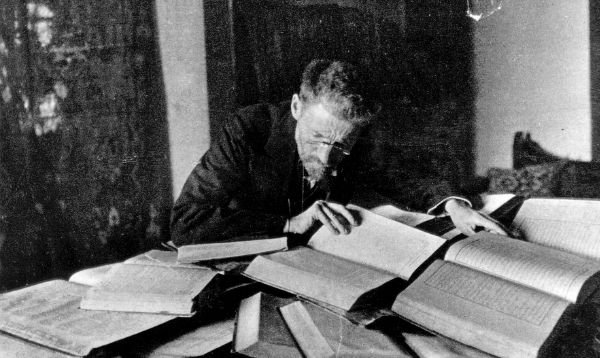
Eliezer Ben-Yehuda, father of modern Hebrew

Israeli literature is literature written by Israelis. Most works classed as Israeli literature are written in the Hebrew language, although some Israeli authors write in Yiddish, English, Arabic and Russian.

== History ==
=== Hebrew writers ===
The foundations of modern Israel writing were laid by a group of literary pioneers from the Second Aliyah including Shmuel Yosef Agnon, the only Nobel Prize winner for literature in Hebrew and the only one for Israeli literature, Moshe Smilansky, Yosef Haim Brenner, David Shimoni, and Jacob Fichman. Until World War I, Hebrew literature was centered in Eastern Europe. After the war and the Russian Revolution many Hebrew writers found their way to mandatory Palestine, so that at the time, Palestinian writing was essentially a continuation of the European tradition. In 1921, 70 writers met in Tel Aviv and founded the Hebrew Writers' Association. About this time the first literary periodicals made their appearance—Ha-Adamah, edited by Brenner, and Ma'abarot, edited by Fichman. The 1920's and 1930's witnessed the emergence of mandatory Palestine as the dominant center of Hebrew literary activity. Majority of the pioneers of Hebrew literature were Zionists, and eventually made their way to mandatory Palestine. The great figures of the early part of the century—Bialik, Ahad Ha-Am, Tchernichovsky—all spent their last years in Tel Aviv, and although this was not the period of their greatest creativity, they exerted a great influence on younger Hebrew writers.

Among the earliest modern Hebrew writers was a small minority of writers who were born in mandatory Palestine. This cadre includes Yitzhaq Shami and Yehuda Burla, Sepharadi Jews whose families migrated to Palestine in the 19th and 18th centuries, respectively. The writing of this group stands out for its authentic depiction of the Arab and Jewish population of mandatory Palestine, told from the vantage point of those who grew up in its midst.

The most important writers of the first generation, S.Y. Agnon and Haim Hazaz, were deeply rooted in their European background, and served as links between the classical writers of the early decades of the Hebrew revival and the Hebrew writers in mandatory Palestine during the following generations.

For the next generation of writers, the center of focus was Mandatory Palestine, even when they were writing about other parts of the world. Their framework was the period of aliyah and, very often, life in the kibbutz. Among the outstanding names are Uri Zvi Greenberg and Avraham Shlonsky, who found in mandatory Palestine the antidote to the rootlessness of the Diaspora.

The third generation of writers emerged around the time of the 1948 Arab–Israeli War. Its key figures (S. Yizhar, Moshe Shamir, Hanoch Bartov, Haim Gouri, Benjamin Tammuz, Aharon Megged) were all sabras or had been brought to the country at an early age. Strong influences now came in from other countries, especially Western. A group called the "Canaanites" even sought to deny the connection between Israelis and Jews elsewhere. But after 1948, a feeling of emptiness and of searching for new values was leading to experiments in exploring the Jewish past.

The subsequent generation of the 1960s (A. B. Yehoshua, Amos Oz, Natan Yonatan, Yoram Kaniuk, Yaakov Shabtai) has endeavoured to place Israeli culture within a world context and stresses not so much the unique aspects of Jewish life and Israel as the universal. This school of writers often identifies itself with the protest literature of other countries.

The following generation, writers who were born in the 1960s and 1970s and made their debut in the 1980s and 1990s, examined the basic questions of Jewish-Israeli existence by exposing the collective tensions in individual characters and fates. Notable writers from this era include Etgar Keret and Sayed Kashua.

=== Religious Jewish writers ===
Starting in the late 1990s Religious writers have brought a new viewpoint into Israeli literature (Rabbi Haim Sabato, Yonadav Kablan, Rabbi Lior Engelman, Yehuda Gizbar-Fenigstein).

=== Yiddish writers ===
Apart from Hebrew writers, there is considerable creative productivity in Israel in other languages, notably in Yiddish. Before World War II, Warsaw, Moscow, and New York were the main centers of Yiddish activity. In Palestine there was still a certain hostility to the Yiddish language, which was felt as a challenge to the Hebrew revival. However, with World War II the whole picture changed. The European centers were liquidated by Hitler and Stalin, and the New York center declined. Immigration brought many of the leading Yiddish writers to Israel. Here the internal attitude relaxed and became friendly, in view of the Holocaust in Europe, on the one hand, and the secure position attained by Hebrew, on the other.

Yiddish writing in Israel can be marked by generations, similar to those in Hebrew literature. The first consisted of writers such as David Pinski and Sholem Asch, who passed their last years in Israel. The second generation, led by Abraham Sutzkever, started its career in Eastern Europe but continued in Israel. The third generation was centered on "Young Israel", a modernist group of poets and prose writers, most of whom are kibbutz members, whose work has been influenced by the avant-garde schools of English and French writing.

Yiddish writing in Israel is concentrated on the European Holocaust (the leading writer on this is Ka-Tzetnik), and life among new immigrants. Yiddish authors in Israel are organized in a Yiddish authors' association.

=== Arabic writers ===
The presence of Arabic-language literature in Israeli society can be initially attributed to Emile Habibi, an Israeli-Palestinian writer and a communist politician. In 1992, he was awarded the Israel Prize for Arabic literature. A fervent communist, Habibi helped created the Israeli Communist Party and established Al-Ittihad, a communist daily Arabic language newspaper published in Haifa. Habibi's works, while often a critique of Israeli society, are nevertheless part of Israeli culture.

== Publication of books in Israel ==
By law, the Jewish National and University Library of the Hebrew University of Jerusalem receives two copies of each book published in Israel. In 2004 it reported that it received 6,436 new books. Most of them were published in Hebrew, and 89% those books published in Hebrew were original to the Hebrew language. Almost 8% of the 2004 crop were children's books and another 4% were textbooks. According to the type of publisher, the books were 55% commercial, 14% self-published, 10% governmental, 7% educational, and 14% published by other types of organizations. The orthodox and ultra-orthodox sector was responsible for 21% of the total titles. 2017 figures show that 17% of books were Torah-related, 16% were literature and 14% children's books.

== See also ==
- Hebrew Book Week
- List of Hebrew-language authors
- List of Hebrew-language poets
- List of Hebrew-language playwrights
- Jewish American literature
