= Nahshon (disambiguation) =

Nahshon is a biblical character.

Nahshon or Nachshon may also refer to:

== First name ==
- Nahshon Dion (born 1978), American filmmaker, artist, and writer
- Nahshon Even-Chaim (born 1971), Australian computer hacker
- Nahshon Garrett, American wrestler
- Nachshon Wachsman (1975–1994), Israeli soldier abducted and killed by Hamas
- Nahshon Wright, American gridiron football player
- Nahshon ben Zadok, 9th century Jewish scholar

== Surname ==
- Baruch Nachshon (1939–2021), Israeli artist
- Edna Nahshon, professor of Jewish theater and drama
- Hilla Nachshon (born 1980), Israeli television host
- Ofer Nachshon (1966–2025), Israeli broadcaster and radio announcer
- Shuli Nachshon (born 1951), Israeli video and installation artist
- Tamar Fish Nachshon (1926–2008), Israeli writer

== Other ==
- Nahshon, Israel, a kibbutz in central Israel
- Nahshon Battalion, a unit of the Israel Defense Forces (regular unit)
- Operation Nachshon, an Israel Defense Forces operation during the 1948 Arab-Israeli War
- Nahal Nahshon, intermittent stream/wadi
