= Liad =

Liad may refer to:

== People ==
- Liad Elmaliach (born 1989), Israeli football player
- Liad Shoham (born 1971), Israeli writer and lawyer

== Other ==
- Lycée International Alexandre-Dumas
