= Birla =

Birla may refer to:

- Birla family
- Aditya Birla Group
- Members of the Birla family:
  - Aditya Vikram Birla
  - Ananya Birla
  - Basant Kumar Birla
  - G. D. Birla
  - K. K. Birla
  - C. K. Birla
  - Kumar Mangalam Birla

== See also ==
- Burla (disambiguation)
