= Burla (surname) =

Burla is a surname. Notable people with the surname include:

- Mikhail Burla (born 1957), politician in Transnistria
- Oded Burla (1915–2009), Israeli writer, son of Yehuda
- Serena Burla (born 1982), American track and field athlete
- Yehuda Burla (1886–1969), Israeli writer
