= Burla =

Burla may refer to:

== People ==
- Burla (surname)

== Places ==
- Burla, India, a town in India
- Burla, Suceava, a commune in Suceava County, Romania
- Burla, a village in Unțeni Commune, Botoșani County, Romania
- Burla, Russia, a rural locality (a selo) in Burlinsky District of Altai Krai, Russia
- Burla (Sitna), a tributary of the river Sitna in Botoșani County, Romania
- Burla (river), a river in Russia and Kazakhstan

== Other uses ==
- Burla, an alternative name for burletta, a musical entertainment

== See also ==
- Birla, a surname
