= Zvi Elpeleg =

Israeli historian (1926–2015)

- צבי אלפלג
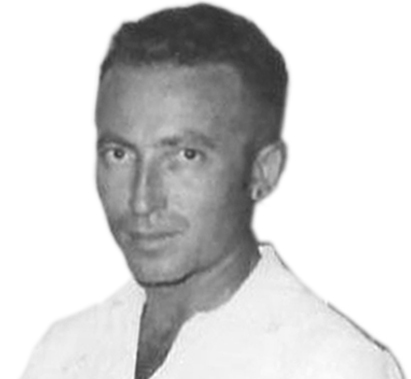
- Zvi Elpeleg at the wedding of his young brother, Yerach
- Born: 2 February 1926; Baranow, Poland
- Died: 27 June 2015 (aged 89)
- Spouse: Michal Snunit

Zvi Elpeleg (Hebrew: צבי אלפלג; 2 February 1926 – 27 June 2015) was an academic, author, and a senior researcher at the Dayan Institute at Tel Aviv University. Born in Poland, Elpeleg served as a colonel in the Israeli army and later received an ambassadorial appointment.

Elpeleg was born in 1926 in Baranow, Poland to his parents Rivka (née Zayfntreger) and Yosef Elphlang. His father was a carpenter and his mother a house wife. Elpeleg was the second of four siblings: Hadasa (1924), David (1928) and Yerachmiel (1929). In 1934 the family came to Israel and settled in the Makabi-Tzrifim neighbourhood in Jaffa. Following David Ben-Gurion's instruction that officers should change their family name to a Hebrew one, Elpeleg changed his name from Elphlang to Elpeleg.

In the mid-1950s Elpeleg was the military governor of the Triangle and from 1956 to 1957 the military governor of Gaza. He became Israel's first military governor of the West Bank in 1967. He would repeat the role during the Israeli occupation of the Fayid region in Egypt in 1973, and again in occupied South Lebanon in 1982.

He served as Israel's ambassador to Turkey from 1995 to 1997.

He entered academia as an Arabist and, since 1972, he was attached as senior researcher to the Dayan Institute. He authored a biography of Haj Amin al-Husseini, which is considered one of the standard works on the man.

Zvi Elpeleg served as chairman of the Turkey-Israel Friendship Association and was appointed Turkey's honorary consul to Tel Aviv by the former Turkish president Süleyman Demirel in gratitude for the role he played in overseeing Israeli IDF Aid for Turkish Earthquake Victims in August 1999.

He was married to the poet Michal Snunit. Elpeleg died on 27 June 2015.

In 2024, Elpeleg's granddaughter Danel Elpeleg published a film "The Governor" about his time as military governor.
