= Uzzi Ornan =

Israeli linguist and activist (1923–2022)

- עוזי אורנן
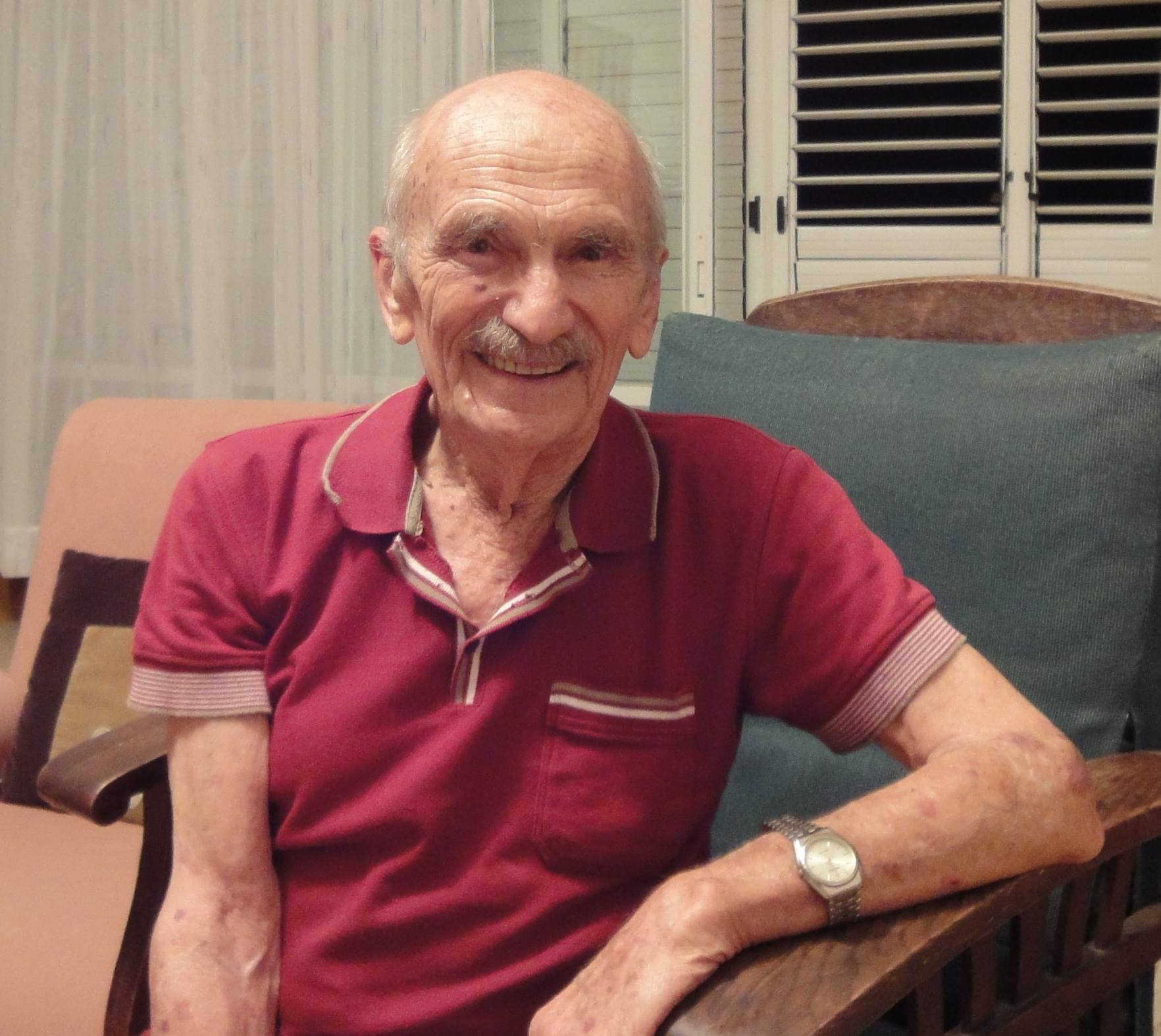
- Born: 7 June 1923; Jerusalem, Mandatory Palestine
- Died: 3 November 2022 (aged 99)
- Other name: Uzziel Halperin
- Occupation: Professor
- Known for: Linguistics, social activism

Uzzi Ornan (Hebrew: עוזי אורנן; ISO 259-3: ˁuzzi ˀornan; 7 June 1923 – 3 November 2022) was an Israeli linguist and social activist. Ornan was a member of the Academy of the Hebrew Language, professor of natural languages computing at the Technion and professor emeritus at the Hebrew University of Jerusalem. Ornan was a member of the Israeli Canaanite movement, founded by his brother Yonatan Ratosh. He was the founder of the League Against Religious Coercion in Israel and an active supporter of the separation of church and state.

== Childhood and youth ==
Uzziel Halperin (later Ornan) was born in Jerusalem to Yechiel Halperin, a Hebrew teacher and supporter of Chaim Weizmann, and Paulia (Penina), a member of Poale Zion. His parents immigrated to Mandate-era Palestine in 1919, as pioneers of the Third Aliyah. One of his brothers was Yonatan Ratosh.

In his youth, Ornan was active in the Irgun as a bomb-maker. In 1944, he was detained by the British authorities. Subsequently, he was deported to and imprisoned in British prison camps in Eritrea, Sudan and Kenya, where he was held until the Israeli Declaration of Independence in 1948.

== Linguistic career ==
In the internment camp, Ornan taught Hebrew phonology and morphology to other detainees. Following his return to Israel, he published his method as Diqduq ha-pe ve-ha-'ozen (Hebrew for "Grammar of Mouth and Ear"), which became a classic method for learning Hebrew grammar skills in high schools. He soon started studying at the Hebrew University of Jerusalem, where he received his Hebrew Linguistics PhD in 1964. He served his alma mater as lecturer and professor until 1987. In 1979 he was elected as a member of the Academy of the Hebrew Language. Ornan headed its committee that set the standards for Hebrew punctuation. Throughout the years he became increasingly interested in natural language computing.

In 1987 he was a visiting professor at the Technion - Israel Institute of Technology in Haifa. He managed a laboratory for natural language computing for its department of Computer Science. He continued to teach and head a laboratory at the Technion until his death. In the 1990s Ornan developed a new standard for the Latin presentation of Hebrew, that allows for complete reversibility between the Hebrew and the Latin script. The standard was adopted by the International Organization for Standardization as ISO 259-3.

== Social activism ==
In 1950 he founded the League Against Religious Coercion, in which he served as secretary and chairman until 1967. In the 1970s he was chairman of the Israeli Secular Movement. He was an opponent of circumcision. His remarks about religious coercion have led to complaints from Knesset members and human rights groups to incite violence. He said in an interview that "without a rebellion it is doubtful whether the religious coercion will change" to the reporter's question about the nature of the rebellion Arnon answered "one that even involves suspending people on an electricity pole". On another occasion Ornan said to a religious Knesset member Nissim Ze'ev during a talk show: "You should be thrown into the sea, and all your schools should be closed". Ornan corrected himself later he meant only to throw the schools to the sea, not the people, as one might understand.

Since the 1990s he has been active in the "I am Israeli" movement, which strives for equality among all Israelis, by dropping the nationality from the formal government registration of each citizen or revising the nationality to include "Israeli" as an option. To this end, several appeals were submitted to Israeli courts.

== Books ==
- Grammar of Mouth and Ear (Hebrew: דקדוק הפה והאוזן), 1947
- Hebrew Syntax, 1963
- Dictionary of Forgotten Words, 1996
- The claws of Asmodai, 1999
- The Final Word, 2003
- In the Beginning was the Word (Hebrew: ברשית היה השפה), 2013
