= Tzur Shezaf =

Israeli writer

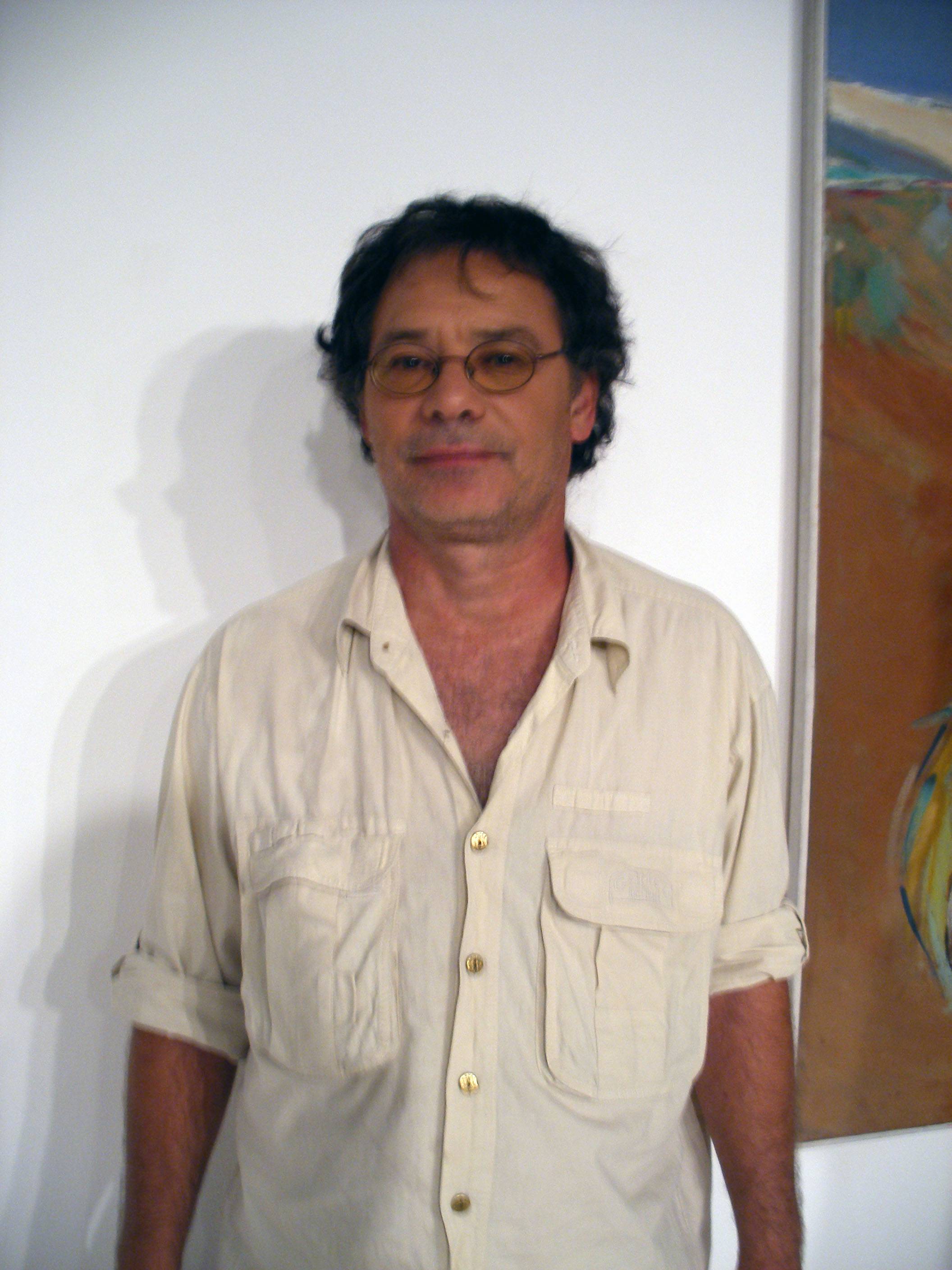
Tsur Shezaf in Giv'atayim Theater, Israel

Tsur Shezaf (Hebrew: צור שיזף; born 1959 in Jerusalem) is an Israeli travel-book writer, journalist and novelist.

== Biography ==
Shezaf wrote for Ynet, Haaretz, and Masa Aher (an Israeli geographical magazine) between 1988 and 2022. As a journalist, Shezaf has been on special assignments throughout Asia, Europe, the Middle East and Africa with Masa Aher, Yedioth Ahronoth, Channel 10 and Channel 1 television. Some of his recent work has also been in photojournalism.

On 1991, he was the first westerner to cross from Istanbul to China former Central Asian USSR republics on the Silk roads, traveling with the king of Georgia Lado Bagrationi and the knight Zaza Zizishvili. The book 'The Silk Road, is a travel book. He headed an NGO by the name of Yafo Yefat Yamim, which worked on rebuilding and recovering the old city of Jaffa - protecting the old harbor and its fishermen from privatizing, reclaiming the sea shore that was destroyed by the government and developing human and physical features of the city.

In 2002, Shezaf joined The Greens and announced his intention to join the party's electoral list for the following year's Knesset election. Shezaf withdrew from the party two weeks before the election, but remained in the third slot on the party's list.

He is a writer and his books, novels and travel, deals with the shrinking Israeli open space, affecting nature and humans.

His latest books are: 'The Adventurers', A novel, Da'ash, A Journey to Devil's Doorstep 2016, a journalistic travel book based on more than 25 years of traveling in the Middle East, including covering the Arab Spring and the wars in Iraq and Syria. In contrast, one of his latest book is The Devil from the Sataf, a book of Israeli legends collected and invented.

In 2011, he planted a vineyard in the high Negev Plateau, which can be considered the southernmost vineyards for top wine vines in the northern hemisphere. The small winery produces natural desert wines.

== Works ==
=== Novels ===
- The Adventurers Masaot 2024
- The wife of the lost Pilot Xargol (2011)
- The Happy Man Xargol (2007)
- Storm Is a Calm Place For Us Kinutz - Siman Kriaa(2000)
- Love on the Divide Xargol(1998)
- The Red Buddha Kibutz(1995)
- The Dancer Am Oved(1992)
- Panther Trap Kibutz-Siman Kriaa (1988)

=== Travel Books ===
- Daash, A Journey to Deveil's Doorstep Kibutz-Poalim, (2016)
- End of the road- Death of a Country, a critical travel in Israel Am Oved (2007)
- Shanti Shanti Balagan, An Israeli travel in India Xargol (2004)
- The Panamericana A journey in Central America Masot (2001)
- Witchcraft in Huncabmba Masaot (1997)
- The Road to Happiness - A Journey in Deserts Keter (1994)
- ' The Silk Road, Crossing Asia from Istanbul to Beijing Masaot (1992)
- The Sea Book - A Journey Along the Israeli Shoreline Yedioth Aharonot (1991)

=== Legends ===
- The Devil from the Sataf Agadot-Masaot (2016)
- The Crocodile from Crocodilopolis Agadot-Masaot (2019

=== Travel Guides ===
- Sinai & Egypt (1994), Keter Publishing House
- Jordan (1995), Keter Publishing House

== Awards ==
In 2008, he was awarded the Prime Minister's Prize for Hebrew Writers.

== See also ==
List of Hebrew language authors

=== Films ===
- Daash, A Journey to Deveil's Doorstep Ch 1 Israeli TV(2015)
- The Refugees suffering journey Ch 1 Israeli TV (2016)
