= Canaanite =

Canaanite or Chananean (also spelled Chananaean) may refer to:

- Canaan and Canaanite people, Semitic-speaking region and culture in the Ancient Near East, referred to as Phoenicia and Phoenicians by the Greeks, and generally including Israel, Judah, Moab, Edom, Ammon, and Ekron
- Canaanite languages
- Canaanite religion
- Canaanism, a mid-20th century Israeli cultural movement that sought to establish a secular Hebrew Israelite identity distinct from Judaism
