= Micha Josef Berdyczewski =

Ukrainian Jewish writer

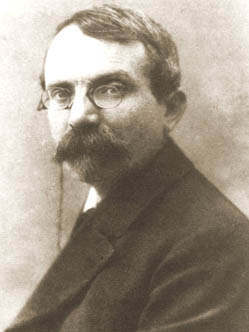
- Born: 7 August 1865; Medzhibozh, Russian Empire
- Died: 18 November 1921 (aged 56); Berlin, Germany
- Occupation: Journalist
- Writing career
- Pen name: Mikhah Yosef Bin-Gorion
- Genres: Journalism, Novels, Short stories
- Literary movement: Modern Hebrew literature

Micha Josef Berdyczewski (Hebrew: מיכה יוסף ברדיצ'בסקי), or Mikhah Yosef Bin-Gorion (7 August 1865 – 18 November 1921) (surname also written Berdichevsky), was a Podolian Jewish writer of Hebrew, a journalist, and a scholar. He appealed for the Jews to change their way of thinking, freeing themselves from dogmas ruling the Jewish religion, tradition and history, but is also known for his work with pre-modern Jewish myths and legends. He wrote in Hebrew, Yiddish and German and has been described as "the first Hebrew writer living in Berlin to be revered in the world of German letters".

== Biography ==
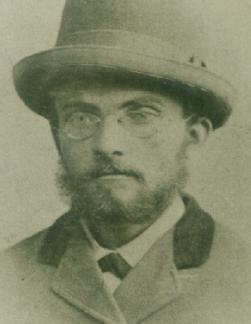

Micha Josef Berdyczewski was born in 1865 in the town of Medzhibozh (today Medzhybizh) in Podolia Governorate, to a family of Hasidic Rabbis. His father was the town Rabbi. In his youth he began to read works from the Jewish Enlightenment, and their influence is noticeable in his works. Berdyczewski was forced to divorce his first wife following her family's objection to his involvement with secular literature. He then moved to the Volozhin Yeshiva, but there too, his pursuit of unconventional literature stirred anger and objection.

One of his earliest publications was about this period of his life—an article titled "Hetzitz V'nifga" (הציץ ונפגע in Hebrew—literally "peeked and got hurt", meaning "gone to heresy"), published in 1888 in the newspaper Ha-Melitz. Most of his works from this period were polemic, and his emotional style became his trademark throughout his writing career.

In 1890 he went to Germany and Switzerland, studied at the universities of Berlin, Breslau and Bern, and completed his Doctor of Philosophy degree. In this period Berdyczewski studied the works of the great German philosophers Nietzsche and Hegel, and was deeply influenced by them. In the ten years until his return to Ukraine, he published many articles and stories in Hebrew journals. Up to 1900, the year in which he married Rahel Ramberg, Berdyczewski had published ten books.

Upon his return to Ukraine, Berdyczewski encountered the harsh reality of Jewish life in the Pale of Settlement, and subsequently the subject of many of his stories is the deterioration of the traditional way of life. His father, who had served for many years as rabbi in the village of Dubova in the Uman area, was murdered during the Petliura Pogroms in 1919.

After a short stay in Warsaw, Berdyczewski returned to Germany in 1911, where he lived until his death in 1921. He is buried in the Jewish Cemetery in Weißensee, Berlin.

== Literary career ==
Berdyczewski adopted the surname Bin-Gorion, first used to sign a collection of his works that he published in Berlin in 1914. The name Bin-Gorion is also inscribed on his tombstone. His last years were spent in intensive writing and research, collecting Jewish legends and folktales and publishing in Hebrew, Yiddish, and German. After his death, his wife and their son Emanuel Bin-Gorion translated some of his works into German, among them Die Sagen der Juden ("The Legends of the Jews", 1935) and Der Born Judas ("The Well of Judah"), published in six volumes.

Berdyczewski's popularity among the Jews of his age is attributed to his success in expressing their ambivalent attitude towards the traditional Jewish world, and to the secular European culture.

== Commemoration ==
The Israeli moshav Sdot Micha, founded in 1955, was named after him.

== Published works ==
- Der Born Judas (6 Vols., 1924)
- Sinai und Garizin (1926)
- Die Sagen der Juden (5 Vols., 1927)
