= Michal Snunit =

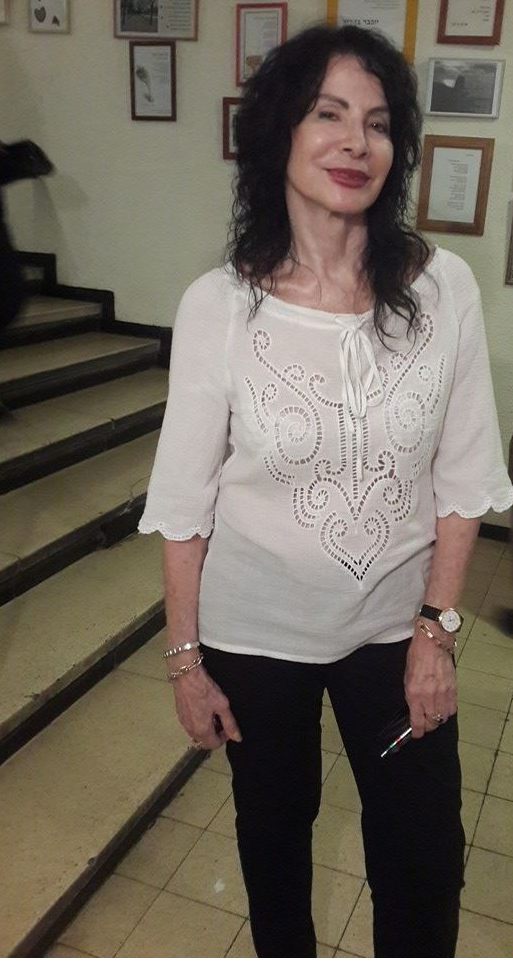
- Born: 1940 (age 85–86); Ein HaHoresh, Israel
- Education: Tel Aviv University
- Occupations: Journalist, magazine editor, poet, children's book writer
- Spouse: Zvi Elpeleg
- Awards: Prime Minister's Prize for Hebrew Literary Works

Michal Snunit (Hebrew: מיכל סנונית; born 1940) is an Israeli journalist, magazine editor, poet and author of books for children.

== Biography ==
Michal Lerner (later Snunit) was born in Kibbutz Ein Hahoresh, which her Belgian-born parents helped to found. She studied Hebrew literature and theater at Tel Aviv University. She was married to Zvi Elpeleg until his death in June of 2015.

== Literary career ==
From 1975 to 1979, Snunit was the editor of a weekly magazine. In addition to her books for young readers, she has published articles on children's literature and written lyrics for children's musicals.

The Soul Bird is a poetic story for children about the relationship between ourselves and our soul. It has sold 400,000 copies in Israel and has been translated into over 25 languages. Its appeal is similar to that of Saint-Exupéry's The Little Prince, using the simple language of childhood to convey a deeper philosophical message.

She is a 2005 recipient of the Prime Minister's Prize for Hebrew Literary Works.

== See also ==
- Hebrew literature
