= Oded Burla =

Israeli writer, poet and artist, known for children's literature

Oded Burla (Hebrew: עודד בורלא; June 23, 1915 – July 26, 2009) was an Israeli writer, poet, and artist. He is considered one of the founders of children's literature in Hebrew.

== Biography ==
Oded Burla was born in Jerusalem to a Sephardic Jewish family. His father Yehuda Burla, was a famous Hebrew novelist. Burla's young brother, Yair, was also a writer and translator. His early years were spent moving between Jerusalem, Haifa and Zikhron Ya'akov. At 13, he transferred to the school at Kibbutz Beit Alfa and then Mikveh Israel, an agricultural school near Holon.

Burla died in 2009 at the age of 94, following a long battle with skin cancer.

== Literary and art career ==
From 1949 to 1955 Burla lived in the USA where he taught in Hebrew schools, worked as an announcer and speechwriter for a radio station "Kol America". When he came back to Israel, he was admitted to Bezalel Academy of Art and Design where he majored in graphics.

His first book, Letters to Liora, was a collection of letters he wrote to his niece when he was in the USA. Shortly before his death, Letters to Liora was reissued, after remaining a collector's item for many years.

Burla wrote and illustrated 70 books. His books combine children's naivety and their sharpness, humor and amusing expressions. Most of his characters are animals put into strange adventurous situations. In his writings, Burla paid great attention to even small details and expressed a love of nature. His last book was published in 1996. However his works continue to be popular today, his book ״המנגינה״, The Tune, was recently published by the PJ Library in Israel, and translated into English (2021) for Kalaniot Books by Ilana Kurshan.

== Awards and recognition ==
In 2008, Burla was awarded the Bialik Prize for literature, (jointly with Yeshayahu Koren and Israel Eliraz).

== See also ==
- Israeli literature
