= Aharon Amir =

Israeli Hebrew poet, literary translator and writer

- אהרן אמיר
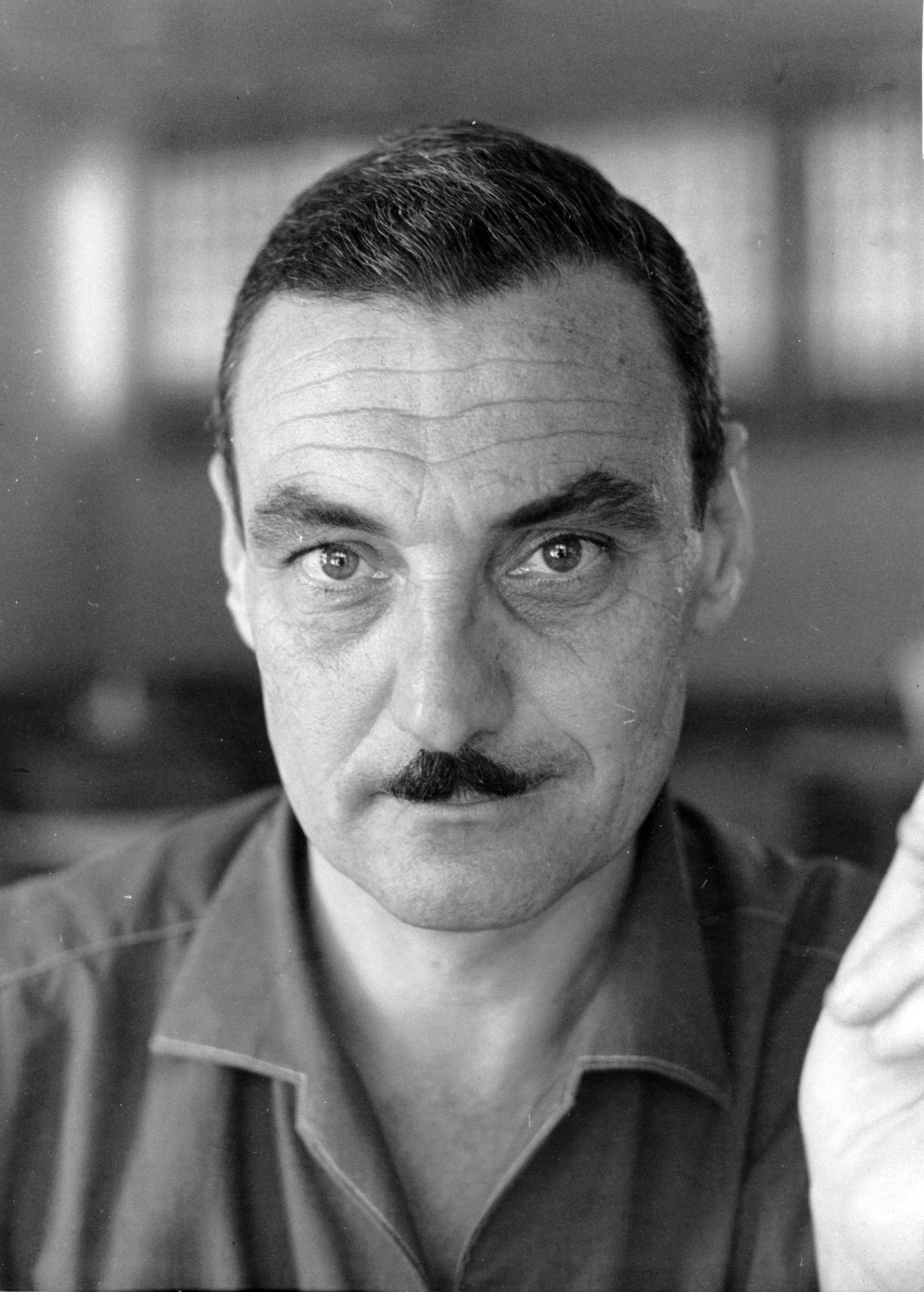
- Aharon Amir, 1967
- Born: January 25, 1923; Kaunas, Lithuania
- Died: February 28, 2008 (aged 85)
- Education: Gymnasia Herzliya; Hebrew University
- Writing career
- Language: Hebrew
- Notable work: Qadim
- Notable awards: Tchernichovsky Prize

Aharon Amir (Hebrew: אהרן אמיר; January 5, 1923 – February 28, 2008) was an Israeli Hebrew poet, a literary translator and a writer.

== Biography ==
Aharon Amir was born in Kaunas, Lithuania. He moved to Palestine with his family in 1933 and grew up in Tel Aviv. His father, Meir Lipec, was later director of the publishing house Am Oved. He attended Gymnasia Herzliya high school. At the time of the British Mandate in Palestine, while studying Arabic Language and Literature at the Hebrew University, Amir was a member of the Irgun and Lehi undergrounds as well as a founding member of the Canaanite movement (Canaanism), which saw Hebrew or Israeli culture as defined by geographical location rather than religious affiliation. Amir was married to Bettine, a poet and painter. He had three children from a previous marriage.

He died of cancer on February 28, 2008, at the age of 85, and left his body to science.

== Literary career ==
Amir translated over 300 books into Hebrew, including English and French classics by Melville, Charles Dickens, Camus, Lewis Carroll, Joseph Conrad and Virginia Woolf, Edgar Allan Poe, Ernest Hemingway, John Steinbeck, Emily Brontë and O. Henry. He also translated works by Winston Churchill and Charles de Gaulle. He founded and edited the literary magazine Keshet, which he closed in 1976 after eighteen years of publication to concentrate on his own writing. In 1998, the magazine was revived as The New Keshet.

He was often known in Israel thanks to a popular song by Meir Ariel, which cited Amir's translation of Hemingway's Islands in the Stream.

== Awards and recognition ==
- In 1951, Amir was awarded the Tchernichovsky Prize for exemplary translation.
- In 2003, he was awarded the Israel Prize, for translation.

== Publications ==
=== Books Published in Hebrew ===
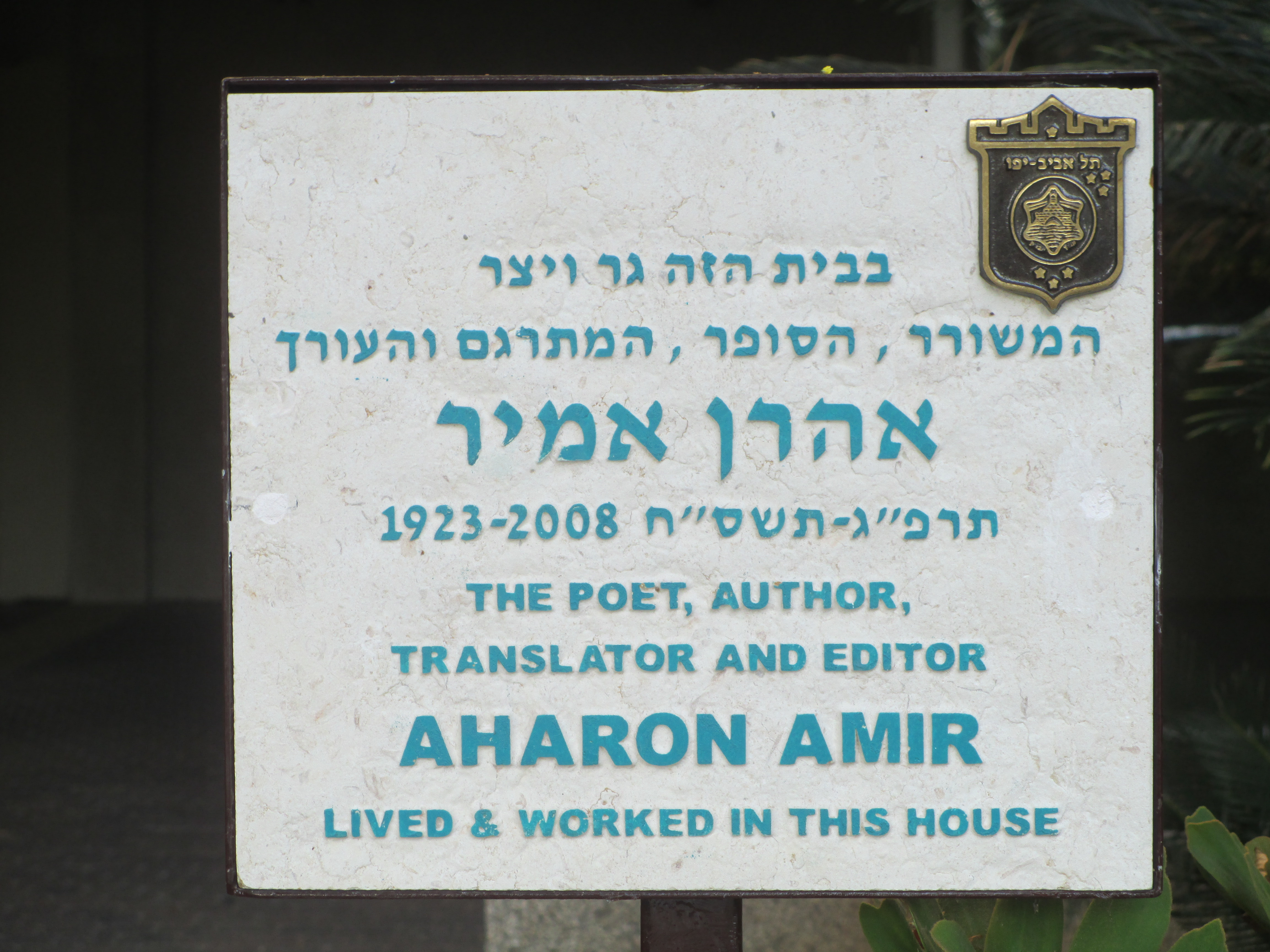
Memorial plaque in Tel Aviv

- Qadim (poetry), Machbarot Lesifrut, 1949 [Qadim]
- Love (stories), Machbarot Lesifrut, 1951 [Ahava]
- And Death Shall Have No Dominion (novel), Zohar, 1955 [Ve-Lo Tehi La-Mavet Memshala]
- Seraph (poetry), Machbarot Lesifrut, 1956 [Saraph]
- Nun (trilogy), Massada, 1969-1989 [Nun]
- Yated (poetry), Levin-Epstein, 1970 [Yated]
- Prose (stories), Hadar, 1972 [Proza]
- A Perfect World (novel), Massada, 1975 [Olam She-Kullo Tov]
- A Separate Peace (poetry), Massada, 1979 [Shalom Nifrad]
- Aphrodite or the Organized Tour (novella), Ma'ariv, 1984 [Afroditi o Ha-Tiyul Ha-Meurgan]
- Heres (poetry), Zmora Bitan, 1984 [Heres]
- The Clouds Return After the Rain (poetry), Bialik Institute/Machbarot Lesifrut, 1991 [Ve-Shavu He-Avim Ahar Ha-Geshem]
- Aaron's Rod (poetry), Zmora Bitan, 1996 [Mate Aharon]
- The Villains (novel), 1998 [Ha-Nevalim]

=== Books in Translation ===
- And Death Shall Have No Dominion(Le soldats du matin); French: Paris, Le Seuil, 1961

== See also ==
- List of Israel Prize recipients
