= David Schütz =

Israeli writer (1941–2017)

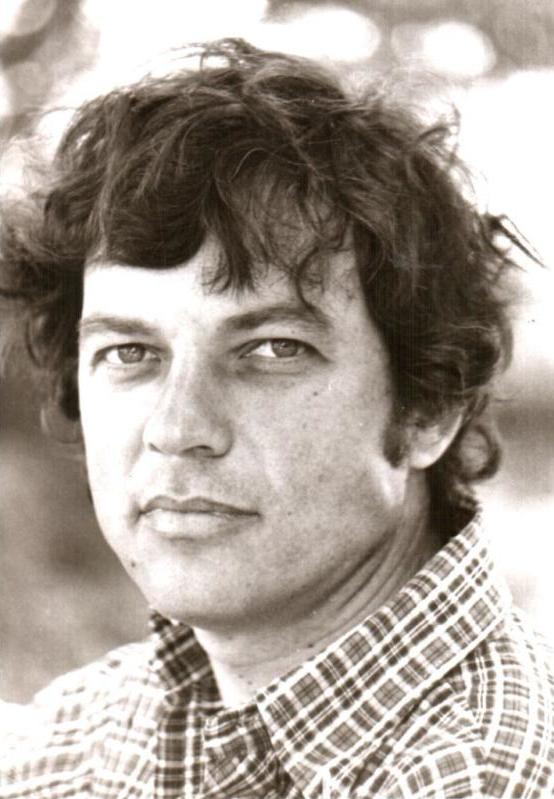
David Schütz (1989)

David Schütz (Hebrew: דוד שיץ; August 5, 1941 – July 16, 2017) was an Israeli fiction writer.

== Biography ==
David Schütz (birth name Dietmar Engbert Müllner) was born in Berlin and immigrated to Israel at the age of seven.

He had a master's degree in history from The Hebrew University and also studied cinema at the BFI.

Schütz published 9 books. His first book "The Grass and the Sand" (Hebrew: העשב והחול) was published in 1978. The book was translated into French (L'herbe et le sable : roman) and German (Gras und Sand : roman). He received a number of literary prizes, including the Bernstein Prize (original Hebrew novel category) in 1988. His experiences as a child and adolescent were central to his writing. His characters struggle with the aftermath of catastrophe of the Holocaust, suffering its consequences in their day-to-day existence, often from the standpoint of a child.

He died on 16 July 2017 after a long illness and was survived by 3 daughters.

== Published books ==
- L'herbe et le sable, novel; translated from Hebrew by Liliane Servier (Paris: Hachette, 1981)
- Gras und Sand, novel translated from Hebrew by Judith Brüll-Assan and Ruth Achlama (Hildesheim: Claassen, 1992)
- Das goldene Tagebuch, translated from Hebrew by Mirjam Pressler (Frankfurt/Main: Ali-Baba-Verlag, 1993)
- Trilogie des Abschieds, novel, from Hebrew by Barbara Linner (Hildesheim: Classen, 1993)
- Avischag, novel, from Hebrew by Mirjam Pressler (Hildesheim: Claassen, 1996)
- Das Herz der Wassermelone, German/Israeli edition, translated from Hebrew by Pavel C. Goldenberg. With an afterword by Wolf Biermann (Hildesheim: Claassen, 1995).

העשב והחול, תל-אביב : ספרית פועלים, תשל"ח 1978.
ההזדמנות האחרונה, תל אביב : ספרית פועלים, תש"מ 1980.
עד עולם אחכה, תל אביב : זמורה-ביתן, תשמ"ז 1987.
שושן לבן, שושן אדום, תל-אביב : הקיבוץ המאוחד, 1988.
אבישג, תל-אביב : עם עובד, תש"ן 1989.
אבישג, ירושלים : כתר, 1990.
יומן הזהב, ירושלים : דומינו, 1991.
העשב והחול, ירושלים : כתר, 1992.
שבע נשים, ירושלים : כתר, 1995.
כמו נחל, תל אביב : ידיעות אחרונות : ספרי חמד, 1997.
