= Yonatan Ratosh =

Polish-born Israeli poet and journalist (1908–1981)

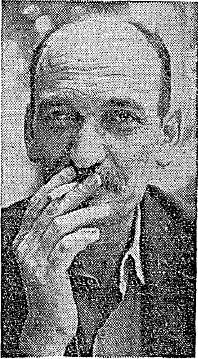
Yonatan Ratosh in 1957.

Yonatan Ratosh (Hebrew: יונתן רטוש) was the literary pseudonym of Uriel Shelach (Hebrew: אוריאל שלח) (November 18, 1908 – March 25, 1981), an Israeli poet and journalist who founded the Canaanite movement.

== Biography ==
Uriel Heilperin (later Shelach) was born in Warsaw, Poland in 1908 to a Zionist family. His father, Yechiel, was a Hebraist educator who raised Uriel and his siblings in Hebrew. Ratosh immigrated to Israel in 1919 on board the Ruslan, along with Ratosh came the historian Joseph Klausner, the artist Yitzhak Frenkel and the architect Zeev Rechter. In 1921, the family immigrated to Mandate Palestine. Uriel changed his last name from Heilperin to Shelach, later adopting the pseudonym Yonatan Ratosh in his literary and political writing. He attended the Hebrew University of Jerusalem and the Sorbonne, and published his first poem in 1926. In the mid-1930s, he was appointed editor of HaYarden, the official organ of the Revisionist movement and was active in right-wing underground organizations.

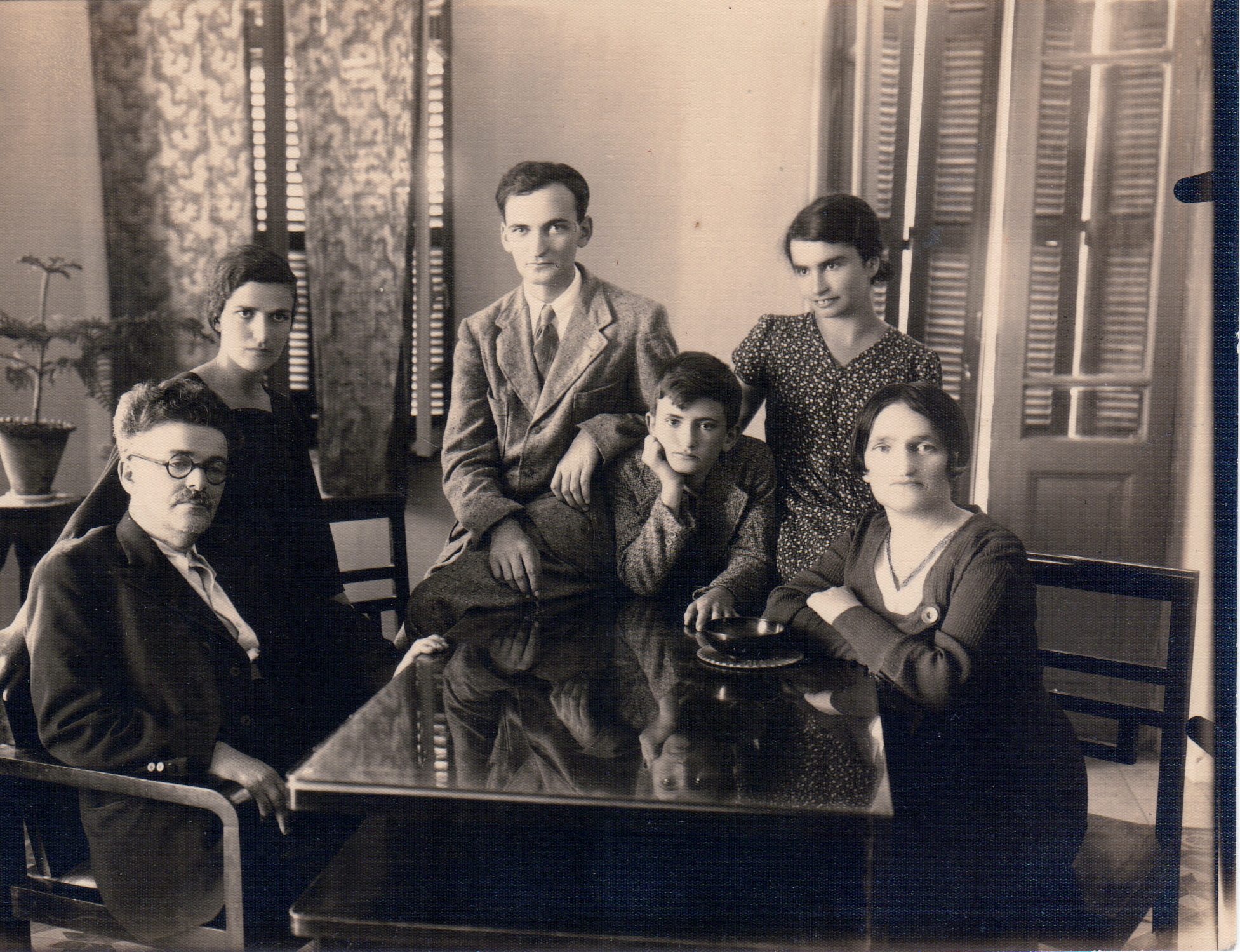
Ratosh (centre) and his family

Ratosh was awarded the Prime Minister's Prize. His son Saharon Shelah, a mathematician, won the Israel Prize. Another son, Hamman Shelah, was a magistrate judge who was killed along with his wife and daughter in the Ras Burqa massacre. One of his brothers was linguist Uzzi Ornan. Ratosh died in 1981.

== Revisionist Zionism ==
In the late 1920s, Ratosh (using his birth name, Heilperin) embraced Revisionist Zionism, becoming close friends with Eliyahu Bet-Zuri and Avraham Stern. A talented writer, Heilperin became the editor of the official publication of the Irgun, "Ba-Cherev" (בחרב, "By the Sword"). In 1937, Jabotinsky demoted Heilperin for the extremism of his views. Frustrated, he traveled to Paris to meet with another disillusioned Revisionist, Semitic language scholar Adia Gurevitch (A.G. Horon). Heilperin and Gurevitch formulated "a new Hebrew consciousness" combining the former's political ideas with the latter's historical outlook. In their minds, the Jewish People were a part of a larger Hebrew civilization bound together by Canaanite languages and nationhood in Canaan. With the outbreak of World War II he began writing (as Ratosh) for Haaretz.

== Literary career and Canaanite movement ==
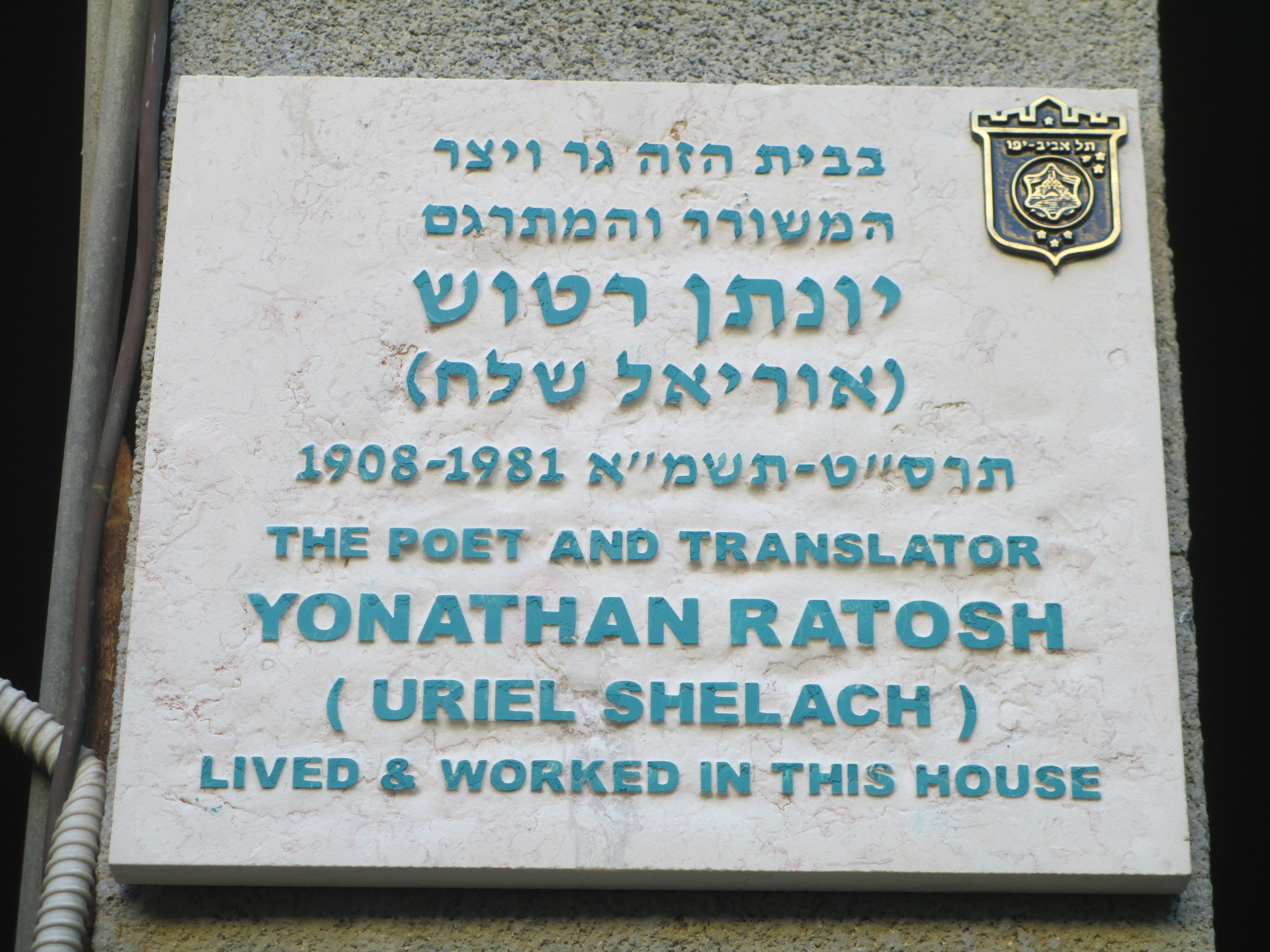
Plaque outside Ratosh's house in Tel Aviv

Adopting the pseudonym of Yonatan Ratosh, he began to write poetry that "tore apart" (Hebrew: ריטש - riṭṭêš) existing conventions of style, language, and culture. In 1939, he founded the Canaanite movement, which rejected both religion and Jewish nationalism. This group promoted the theory of a shared cultural heritage for the entire Middle East. The literary output of the movement was strongly influenced by an ancient, pre-biblical mythology and vocabulary. Ratosh's own work is closely linked to the movement's political theory. His early poems are very structured, and play with rhyme and repetition to create an almost hypnotic effect. His later work employs colloquial diction and more contemporary style. While the movement founded by Ratosh was never broad, T. Carmi wrote that "its emphasis on myth and its stylistic mannerisms had considerable impact on contemporary poetry."

In an essay entitled "Ketav el ha-No'ar ha-'Ivri" (כתב אל הנער העברי, "Epistle to the Hebrew Youth") from 1943, Heilperin/Ratosh presented his new ideas to the Hebrew-speaking public. This and other essays called for the community of the Yishuv to divorce themselves from their Jewish roots and embrace a new identity as "Hebrews". The "Young Hebrews" became known as the Canaanites, a mocking name coined by Haaretz editor Avraham Shlonsky.

In 1950, Ratosh founded and co-edited the literary journal Alef which published translations of the work of Stendhal, Camus, Shaw and O'Neill. Ratosh continued publishing poetry and enjoyed a brief renaissance as an ideologue after the Six-Day War. His political philosophy had an impact across the political spectrum: sharing the Right's irredentism and advocating a secular (in lieu of Jewish) state like post-Zionists, particularly radical peace advocate Uri Avnery. His last poem in book form was Hava ("Eve"), published in 1963. In it, he reinterprets the story of the Garden of Eden as the coronation of a Rain God.

== Hebrew science fiction ==
Ratosh is considered among the pioneers of Hebrew science fiction, having translated in 1952 the anthology "Adventures in tomorrow" edited by Kendell Foster Crossen and including stories by some of the greatest names in the period's Science Fiction. Ratosh signed the translation under his actual name, Uriel Shelach, rather than the Ratosh pen name, and called it היה היה בעתיד (literally "Once Upon a Future"). Due to the dearth of Hebrew SF at the time, Ratosh's translation had a proportionally greater impact in Israel than the original had in the US.

== Selected poems ==
- Torah (Hayarden, 3 March 1937)
