= Yitzhaq Shami =

Palestinian Jewish and Israeli writer

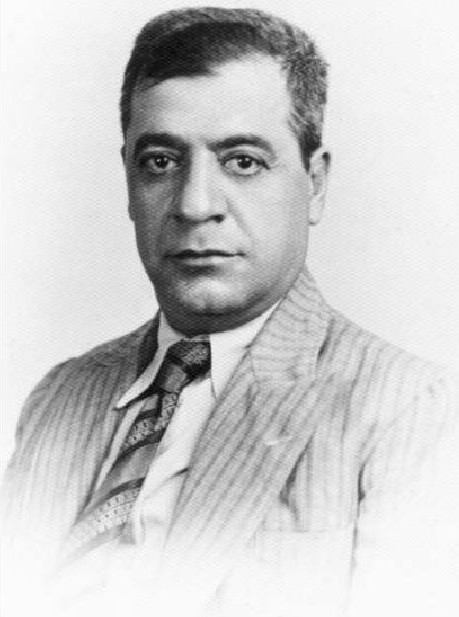
Yitzhaq Shami

Yitzhaq Shami (Hebrew: יצחק שמי, born Yitzhaq Sarwi; August 4, 1888 – March 1, 1949) was a Jewish and Israeli writer, who wrote both in Arabic and Hebrew. He is one of the earliest modern Hebrew literature writers in Mandatory Palestine, prior to Israeli statehood. His work was unique for his period, since in contrast with the vast majority of Hebrew writers of the period he crafted his art based on characters who were either Arabs or Sephardic Jews, residing in the Ottoman Palestine, and his literary influences were predominantly Arab and Middle Eastern. Shami published short stories, one novella, several poems and a number of essays.

== Biography ==
Shami was born in Hebron (al-Khalil) in 1888, eldest of three sons. His father, Eliyahu, was a textile merchant of Syrian Jewish origin, who relocated from Damascus to Hebron in 1885. The father was therefore known as "a-Shami" (the Damascene), and that was the origin of the pen-name later adopted by the writer. Eventually, it became his legal name as well. His mother, Rivka Castel, was a Hebronite from the illustrious Castel family, a traditional Sephardic family which had lived in Hebron for generations. Growing up, Shami spoke Arabic with his father, and Ladino with his mother, and the family conducted its life in customary Middle Eastern style of the period. His family was religiously observant, and in his youth, he studied Hebrew and Arabic in the local religious school.

While Shami was growing up, his father traveled across the Middle East and in the locality for his business, and through his father, Shami was exposed to the local villagers (fellahim), which were later treated as characters in his stories. A critical influence on Shami as a young teenager was Jurji Zaydan (died 1914)—founder of the Arabic Al-Nahda (Revival), modernizing of the Arabic language, one of the founders of the University of Cairo, and father of Pan-Arabism.

Shami was sent to a Hebron yeshiva to study under Rabbi Chaim Hezekiah Medini, renowned author of the Sdei Chemed and Chief Rabbi of Hebron. Influenced by secular literature, he rebelled against religious education and was asked to leave the yeshiva over his "heretical attitudes." In 1905 at age 17, he moved to Jerusalem and enrolled in the Ezra Teacher's Training College, where he completed his studies in 1907. His father opposed his secular studies, while his mother secretly sent him money on occasion until her suicide. During his studies, he met other young writers, among them Yehuda Burla. While living in Jerusalem, he began dressing in Western clothing and was exposed to Zionism, meeting future icons of the Zionist movement such as future Israeli President Yitzhak Ben-Zvi and Hebrew poet Shmuel Yosef Agnon. He is also thought to have attracted the attention of future Israeli founding Prime Minister David Ben-Gurion as an expert on Arab society.

After completing his studies, Shami began teaching. He initially taught in the Zionist agricultural settlements of Gedera and Mazkeret Batya before moving to Damascus to work as a Hebrew teacher. While he was there, he heard that David Ben-Gurion and Yitzhak Ben-Zvi were planning on studying law in Constantinople. He wanted to join them, but was prevented from doing so due to lack of means. Instead, he moved to Bulgaria where he continued to work as a Hebrew teacher, hoping to save up enough money to enroll in law school. While in Bulgaria, he met Pnina Gingold, a Jewish immigrant to Palestine from Russia who was also teaching in Bulgaria. They married, but their plans to return to Palestine were disrupted by the outbreak of World War I: they would have to wait until the end of the war to return. While they were in Bulgaria, their son Yedidya was born.

Upon returning to Palestine at the war's end, they moved to Hebron and both worked as teachers. He also served as secretary of the Jewish community in Hebron. His poor financial situation, which would plague him throughout his life, as well as Pnina's heart disease, and his emphysema in later years would significantly hamper his literary output. Pnina died in 1925, and he was later remarried to Sarah Kalish, a nurse who he had met in Damascus. He survived the 1929 Hebron massacre by hiding in the home the Mani family. Shami was deeply disturbed by the incident, and signed a petition condemning Arab propaganda efforts and urging a British investigation together with the chief rabbis of Hebron and other figures.

Shami eventually left Hebron, settling in first in Tiberias where he worked as a teacher, then in Haifa, where he worked as a teacher and court clerk. He continued to miss his native city, and in a 1932 letter to his lifelong friend David Avisar, expressed a desire to write a book on the city's history. He spent the rest of his life living in Haifa, and died there in 1949.

== Literary works ==
"He had begun his career writing on themes of Arabic literary production, both in Arabic and Hebrew. The early essays that still exist include contributions on Jurji Zaydan historical fiction, various tracts on Arab poetry, and an essay on the origins of modern Arab theatre. The Jerusalem Municipal Archives also include correspondence in Arabic with a number of his colleagues, including his fellow Sephardic writer Yehuda Burla, but apparently none of his Arabic writings are available in print

The total volume of Shami's works was limited, mostly short stories. Regardless, some critics held him to be "one of the most notable modern Hebrew Sephardic writers." His best known work is the short novella—Vengeance of the Fathers. Six of this short stories and the novella were published posthumously as Shami's stories in Hebrew—Sipurey Shami, in English (2000), and in French.

== Critical Perspectives ==
The modern Hebrew critic Gershon Shaked wrote that Vengeance of the Fathers, published in 1928, was one of the most important works in modern Hebrew literature. Anton Shammas the Palestinian writer and critic, wrote—"Shami brought into the scene of modern Hebrew literature some seventy years ago, a local Palestinian validity that hasn't been matched, or challenged, since Vengeance of the Fathers is the only novel in modern Hebrew literature whose characters, landscapes and narrative voice are all Palestinian." Merle Rubin, in the Los Angeles Times Book Review described it as "Luminous tales from a bygone middle east". Issa Boullata, in Al Jadid described the works as evidence of co-existence that vanished.

Jerold Auerbach, Professor Emeritus of History and author of Hebron Jews: Memory and Conflict in the Land of Israel, praises Shami's book Hebron Stories as "evocative glimpses of Hebron at the turn of the twentieth century."

In 2004 Shami was recognized by the Palestinian Academic Society as one of the important Palestinian writers. With that—he assumed a unique position as a shared cultural asset of both Israelis and Palestinians.
