= Yocheved Bat-Miriam =

Israeli poet (1901–1980)

- יוכבד בת-מרים
- Born: Yocheved Zhlezniak; 5 March 1901; Belarus, Russian Empire
- Died: 7 January 1980 (aged 78); Israel
- Occupation: Poet
- Spouse: Haim Hazaz
- Children: Nahum (Zuzik) Hazaz
- Writing career
- Language: Hebrew
- Notable work: Merahok ("From a Distance")
- Notable awards: 1963: Brenner Prize; 1964: Bialik Prize; 1972: Israel Prize

Yocheved Bat-Miriam (Hebrew: יוכבד בת-מרים; Russian: Иохевед Бат-Мирьям; pen name of Yocheved Zhlezniak) (5 March 1901 – 7 January 1980) was an Israeli poet. Bat-Miriam was born in Belarus to a Hasidic family. She studied pedagogy in Kharkov and at the universities of Odessa and Moscow. During this period, she participated in the revolutionary literary activities of the “Hebrew Octoberists”, a Communist literary group, and one of her earliest poem-cycles, a paean to revolutionary Russia entitled Erez (Land) was published in the group's anthology in 1926. She is unusual among Hebrew poets in expressing nostalgia for the landscapes of the country of her birth. Yocheved migrated to British Palestine, later to be called Israel, in 1928. Her first book of poetry, Merahok ("From a distance") was published in 1929. In 1948, her son Nahum (Zuzik) Hazaz from the writer Haim Hazaz died in the 1947–1949 Palestine war. Since then she never wrote a poem again.

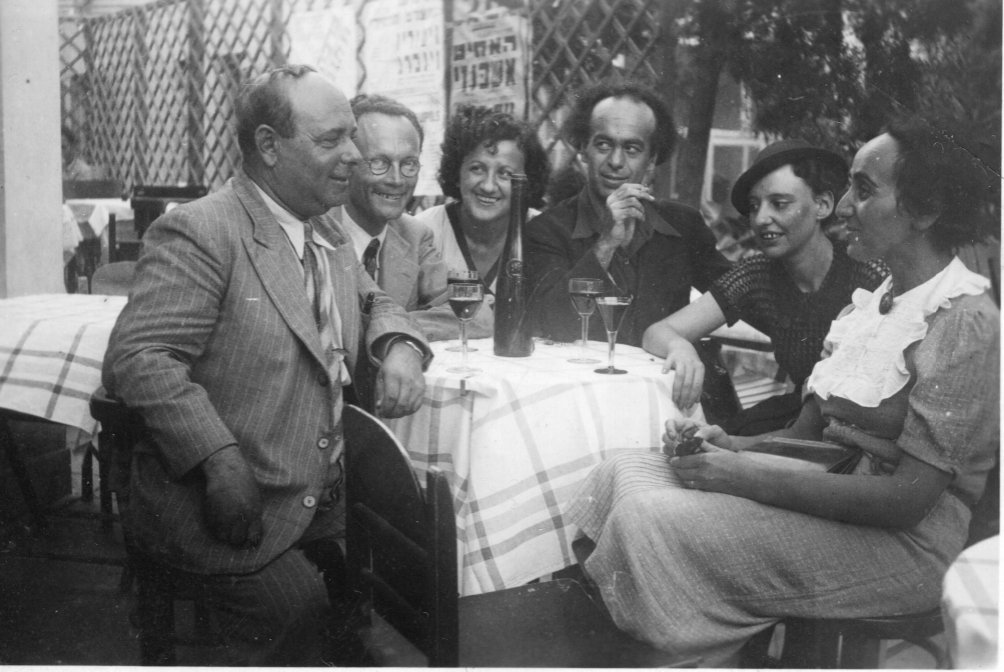
Moshe Lifshits, Israel Zmora, the hostess Luba Goldberg, Avraham Shlonsky, Lea Goldberg, Yocheved Bat-Miriam (1938)

== Selected works ==
- 1929: Merahok ("From a distance").
- 1937: Erets Yisra'el ("The Land of Israel").
- 1940: Re'ayon ("Interview").
- 1942: Demuyot meofek ("Images from the Horizon").
- 1942: Mishirei Russyah ("Poems of Russia").
- 1943: Shirim La-Ghetto ("Poems for the Ghetto").
- 1963: Shirim ("Poems").
- 1975: Beyn Chol Va-Shemesh ("Between Sand and Sun").
- 2014: Machatzit Mul Machatzit : Kol Ha-Shirim ("Collected Poems").

== Awards ==
- In 1963, Bat-Miriam was awarded the Brenner Prize for literature.
- In 1964, Bat-Miriam was awarded the Bialik Prize for literature.
- In 1972, she was awarded the Israel Prize, for literature.

== See also ==
- List of Bialik Prize recipients
- List of Israel Prize recipients
