= Tamar Fish Nachshon =

Israeli writer, novelist and pedagogue

Tamar Fish Nachshon (Hebrew: תמר פיש נחשון; 1926 – 2008) was an Israeli writer, novelist and pedagogue.

== Life ==
Nachshon was born in 1926 in Kaunas, Lithuania. Her father was a beer factory owner and died when she was six. Her mother studied dentistry. Nachshon immigrated to Palestine with her mother in 1934. She was educated at Bet Binuh in Tel Aviv and afterwards studied at Ben Yehuda High School. She studied teaching at Seminar Hakibutzim and was a teacher for 25 years in Afula, Ef'al Regional Council, Tel Aviv, and Jaffa.

Nachshon started a BA in history and literature at Tel Aviv University at the age of 42. For ten years Nachshon lectured to teachers about teaching methods on behalf of the teachers' organization in Israel. She taught teachers how to guide children to read and how to teach writing, among other things.

== Works ==
Nachshon wrote hundreds of learning vacation magazines for children, that were sold hundreds of thousands of copies and were published in many editions. For this she was named: "The great leader of the working magazines". Nachshon wrote eleven children's novels and published a story of seventy-two chapters in the children's magazine Etzbeoni. She also composed two guidebooks for teachers and adapted lessons according to subjects in the school teaching programs.

At the age of eighty Nachshon wrote her first novel for adults. Loving the Love was published in 2007 and told the story of a girl and her love. Before she died she was working on her second novel, which merged love stories with the history of the Yishuv in Palestine during British rule during the 1936–39 Arab revolt in Palestine and World War II.
