= Liad Shoham =

Israeli writer and lawyer (born 1971)

Liad Shoham ליעד שהם
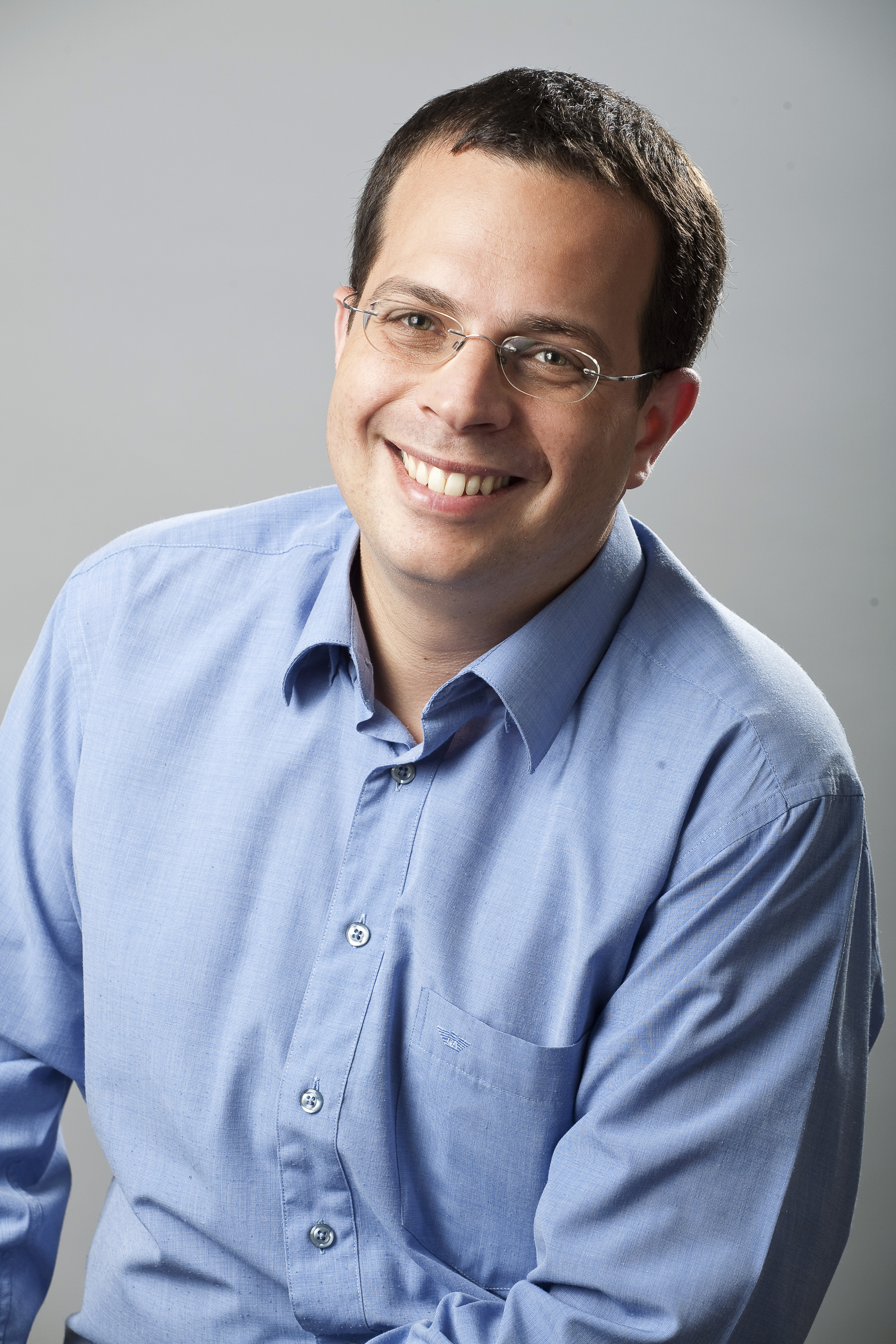
- Born: 31 December 1971 (age 54); Givatayim, Israel
- Occupation: Crime Novelist Lawyer
- Writing career
- Genre: Crime fiction Legal Thrillers
- Subjects: Crime, thriller, mystery, Legal Thrillers
- Notable works: Lineup, Asylum City, Blood Oranges thumbnail

Liad Shoham (Hebrew: ליעד שהם; born 1971) is an Israeli writer and lawyer. He is Israel's leading thriller writer and has been dubbed the Israeli John Grisham.

== Biography ==
Liad Shoham was born in Givatayim. His mother was the principal of "Tihon Hadash" high school for many years. His father worked for many years in the Ministry of Defense. In his childhood, Shoham lived a few years in Paris, due to his father's work. When they came back to Israel they settled down in Petah Tikva. Shoham served in the Intelligence Corps. His LLB is from the Hebrew University of Jerusalem and he did his LLM in International Commercial Law at the London School of Economics.

Shoham has been a member of the Israeli Bar Association since 1997. He still works as an attorney and is a partner in the law firm Golan, Goldschmidt & Co. As an attorney Shoham specializes in administrative and commercial law.

Shoham lives in Tel Aviv; he is married with two children.

== Writing ==
Shoham never wrote as a child and never wanted to become a writer. After he came back to Israel from his studies in London, he wrote about his experiences abroad and sent the manuscript to different publishers. They all rejected it, except Kinneret. His next two books dealt with life in Israel, and afterwards he wrote a humorous book about the Bible. After he finished his fourth book, he got writer's block and lacked inspiration. In a conversation with Dov Alfon, his Kinneret chief editor, Alfon suggested that Shoham write a thriller. Since then he has written nine thrillers, along with two children's books and a trilogy for young adults.

All of his books were bestsellers in Israel and critically acclaimed.

Liad Shoham is also one of the creators of the TV series "Asylum City", based on his book of that name.

== Books ==
London in a Pita, 2001

Amusing cultural differences between Israelis and English, from the point of view of an Israeli graduate student in London.

Life on Diagonal, 2002

Anecdotes about the lives of Israeli singles.

Extra Small, 2003

Short stories about daily life in an extra small country, Israel.

God's Gang, 2005

Twenty eight biblical stories told from a fresh and amusing point of view.

A week in the Life, 2007

Gili Korman is a small lawyer in a big firm for inheritance and Wills. One day, a beautiful young woman enters his office wishing a will, that in a case of her death, Korman will inherit her. Things got puzzled and Korman finds himself accused in murder.

Unlisted Number, 2008

Yoni Bare'el, A district court intern falls a victim to a sting, and is blackmailed in order to influence the judge he's working with.

The Fruit of the Poisonous Tree, 2009

Uri Dolev is a respected district court judge and the son of a supreme court judge. Dolev is considered to be an uncompromising judge, who always finds the accused guilty. After a random encounter with a woman on a train, he finds himself accused in murder and see how it is to be the accused and how the justice system, that he advocate, turns her back to him.

Retrial, 2010

Yigal Lavie is convicted in the murder of Galia Alon, a young woman found dead on the Tel Aviv seashore, and sentenced to Life imprisonment. After sixteen years behind bars, his daughter, Dana Lavie, appeals for retrial. She turns to Rubi Berger, a public defender. Berger accepts the challenge, despite knowing that the police and State Attorney despise retrials, due to their unwilling to admit mistakes.

Ran Yagil, nrg Maariv:

"The writer is a lawyer by profession – but also made a serious inquiry that serves the plot meticulously... Shoham has a great sense of humor... In his best moments he reminds me the undisputed king of the crime novel today - John Grisham."

Line Up, 2011

A young woman experiences a cruel rape in Tel Aviv. Her father initiates an independent investigation, and finds Ziv Nevo hanging around the apartment a few days after the rape. The father believes Nevo is the rapist and successfully convinces his daughter and Eli Nahum, the police officer investigating the case. Nevo is a mob member and telling the truth about his deeds at the crime scene could get him killed. At the beginning Nevo admits the crime, but later he recants. Consequently detective Nahum is fired. Nahum makes up his mind to clear his name and carries on his own investigation to find the real rapist.

Kirkus Reviews (starred review):

An elderly woman witnesses a rape as she scans the street with her high-powered binoculars, but at first, she decides not to get involved. The victim's father helps identify a suspect named Ziv Nevo, and Detective Eli Nahum believes he has an easy case. Nevo has been found at the crime scene with no plausible explanation. He is innocent of the rape, but his real reason for being in the neighborhood is even worse. He is—well, it has to do with the Mafia. Detective Nahum is experienced, confident and careless, ready to take shortcuts and get the case over with. Under interrogation, Nevo is afraid to explain what he was doing at night in a strange neighborhood. In fact, he thinks he's been caught for what he was really doing. Once he caves and admits he did it, he finally learns what "it" is. His protestation that he didn't rape anyone can't keep him out of prison. Meanwhile, Nahum gets caught carrying on an affair with a woman in the chief's office. Nahum's career and his marriage collapse at about the same time he realizes what shoddy police work he has done. The good news? Now he has plenty of time to exonerate Nevo, learn his secret and—perhaps hardest of all—rebuild his own marriage. What begins as a crime thriller becomes the story of a detective's search for redemption. This book marks the author's U.S. debut. Let's hope he gives us many more stories like it.

Regina M. Angeli, Iron Mountain Daily News:

"Liad Shoham has written an interesting page turner with a cast of multi-faceted characters. John Grisham fans may wish to take their literary passport to Tel Aviv and take a look at Liad Shoham's 'Lineup.'"

Asylum City, 2012

Michal Poleg is a young social activist assisting African migrant workers in southern Tel Aviv. Poleg accuses certain members of the Knesset of a merciless endeavors to deport the refugees. A few days after filing a formal complaint, Poleg's corpse is found in her apartment after a brutal murder. Gabriel Takela came from Africa to Israel, crossing Sinai Peninsula, where his sister was kidnapped by the Bedouin, and sold to prostitution. The kidnappers demand 20 thousand shekels for her release. Takela came to Poleg's appatment in order to ask her for help, and find her dead body. A neighbor accidentally enters the apartment, convinced that Takela is the murderer.

Officer Anat Nachmias has never been asked to lead an investigation until she is assigned to Michal's case. Determined not to let her superiors—or Michal—down, she resolves to leave no avenue unexplored. But the deeper Anat delves into Michal's activism, the more she is convinced that the working theory is wrong, especially when she can't believe a word of the young African man who soon confesses to the crime. What she does believe is that Michal, a petite, opinionated woman, got herself involved in something much bigger, and far more dangerous, than she could handle.

Joined by Michal's clumsy but charming boss, Itai, Anat descends into a shadowy, amoral underworld where war victims and criminals, angels and demons, idealists and cynics, aid organizations and criminal syndicates intersect—and the ruthless prey on the weak. What she discovers will shock the city and set in motion events that will have dramatic, far-reaching consequences.

Publishers Weekly (starred review):

"Israeli author Shoham follows his U.S. debut, 2013's Lineup, with another triumph, a crime novel that shares characters with the earlier book. When Michal Poleg, an activist for the rights of illegal African immigrants, is found murdered in her Tel Aviv apartment, strong evidence implicates one of the very people she had been helping, Gabriel Takela, who was seen fleeing her home right after the murder. Unwilling to go along with the easy answer to the case, Insp. Anat Nachmias digs deeper and antagonizes her superiors, who hope to wrap things up quickly. Anat's investigation and its effects on others' lives are shown from the nuanced perspectives of a state prosecutor, who's afraid that he may have killed his former lover without remembering the act, and an accountant working for a crime lord who has developed a new way to take advantage of the African community. The author movingly depicts the plight of African immigrants in Israel without being heavy-handed".

Blood Oranges, 2014

Shirly Gerbi, a pregnant woman, entering Petah Tikva police station to report that her husband Tamir, a journalist by profession, is missing. Detective Anat Nahmias is in charge of the investigation. Gerbi's dead body is found in the orchards and next to him the gun that killed him. The investigators hold the opinion that Gerbi committed suicide, but Nahmias believes he was murdered.

To find her way through the maze of intrigue she is forced to enlist the help of Ido Dolev, a cynical, sharp political consultant who drives her crazy but also makes her feel alive. Anat struggles with her intense attraction to Ido, with the police's indifference and particularly with herself.

Anat and Ido are in a race against time. Together they uncover the truth simmering behind Petach Tikvah's sleepy streets, the cruel power struggles hiding within the well-kept suburbs, the bubbling corruption that runs through the seemingly serene city.

Alit Karp, Haaretz:

'"Blood Oranges", Liad Shoham's thriller, became a best-seller overnight due to a serious inquiry, a balance between the plot and the characters, and a close relation to the real life in Israel. But not just connection to reality made the book a best-seller, but also the fact it succeed in giving his readers a good balance between characters and the story. Since the book hassuch a solid realistic foundations, it easily convincing the readers in the plots it presents. Furthermore, the combination Shoham serves as a writer between his acquaintance of the Israel society and his understanding of the human soul is fascinating. He also has a saying that isn't entertainment alone that the same greed and drives are the same in every place on earth. He succeeded in adapting all this material into a suspense story.

One of Ours, 2016

On a cold winter day, the brutal murder of the local principal shakes Gofna, a little solitary religious settlement in the Binyamin mountains. Yoav, the son of the settlement's rabbi and spiritual leader, is taking a leave of absence from his training for the Israeli Security Agency ("Shabak") to introduce Anat, his new girlfriend, to his parents. But Inspector Anat Nachmias is not his partner, but a police detective he's met only a few days earlier, when they were both tasked with the undercover investigation of the principal's murder. Yoav and Anat now have just forty eight hours to prove the murder was not an act of terrorism before the entire area ignites. But the two find out that nothing is as it appears and tension rises between Yoav, his family and the community he left behind, while Anat and Yoav become ever closer. As the outside temperatures drop, a sudden snow storm blocks the roads and electricity fails, Yoav and Anat find themselves alone, facing a suspicious community as their cover is blown.

One of Ours is a thriller that discusses the differences between isolated life in the West Bank settlement, Gofna, and down-town Tel Aviv. It is concerned with themes of evil versus innocence, and urban solitude versus close-knit communities. The book describes religious belief and secular life, exposing to the reader to life in a distant settlement in the West Bank.

== TV ==
One of the creators of the Children TV Series "Inspector Tamar and the Captain of Tuesdays" based on his children's book :"Dad Builds a Cake".

One of the creators of the Children TV Series "Asylum City" based on his book "Asylum City"

== Theater ==
One of the creators and writers of the play "Retrial" based on his book "Retrial" in the Gesher Theater .

== Influence and style ==
Shoham wrote about his writing process:

"You have to be credible, you have to draw a plot that is "real" and that readers can believe is plausible. One way of dealing with it is by doing thorough research. Not only does good research greatly enrich the story, it gives the book a high level of credibility. As for myself, I do not start to write before doing research. As part of writing my books, I meet and interview policemen, ADAs, judges, journalists, and scientists. I try to learn how things "really" work...

I think that as a thriller writer, one must be credible and in order to be credible, one must emulate reality. However, the reality I attempt to approximate is not necessarily the "real one", but rather the common perception of reality".

Shoham tells he is influenced especially by the writers Georges Simenon and John Grisham:

"Detective Maigret series - I like very much the realism, the interesting characters and that the mystery solution of the mystery is derived from the understanding of the human nature. I'm trying to implement this principles also in my books."

I was influenced very much by John Grisham in the manner of presenting the society and its problems through criminal suspense plot.

Many of his books dealing in social problems, for example "Asylum City" is dealing in migrant workers problem and Blood Oranges is dealing with municipal corruption:

"I'm attracted to a thrillers in which one can feel and take care of social problems, and this is what I'm doing. I'm choosing a problem that interested me and handling it through the story. Anat Nachmias, the detective who is the main character in my last two novels, is my eyes in the story and she needs to understand like me what is going on here. In the previous book she had to understand the world of refugee seekers in order to solve the case and this time to dive into the world of municipal corruption."

He told that the TV series The Wire influenced on his writing by presenting the story from different point of view:

"Lineup" is my fifth book. In all of my previous books, there was one protagonist who led the plot. This time, I wanted to write a book from different perspectives. When a crime occurs, it affects the lives of many people. I wanted to tell the story through the eyes of the victim, the criminal, their families, the police, attorneys, judges, media, and crime organizations. I believe that not only is the story more dramatic and richer, but the reader also receives a wider panoramic picture. The reader understands how things really work, what happens "behind the scenes" and the various interests of all of the players. In this regard, the television series "The Wire" had an enormous effect on me. I watched it with my wife when she was towards the end of her pregnancy, and was having difficulty sleeping. Through watching the series, I realized how powerful it was to see a dramatic story told from various angles.

== Notable works ==
- Judgement Day (2018)
- One of Ours (2016)
- Blood Oranges (2014)
- My First Goal (2014) – Children's book.
- Asylum City (2013)
- Daddy is Building a Cake (2013) – Children's book.
- Line Up (2011)
- Retrial (2010)
- Fruits of the Poisonous Tree (2009)
- Unlisted Number (2008)
- A Week in the Life (2008)

=== Works in English ===
- Lineup: A Novel / translated from the Hebrew by Sara Kitai (New York : HarperCollins, 2014)
- Asylum City: A Novel / translated from the Hebrew by Sara Kitai (New York : HarperCollins, 2014)

=== Works in German ===
- Tag der Vergeltung : Thriller / aus dem Hebräischen von Ulrike Harnisch (Köln : M. DuMont Schauberg, 2013)
- Stadt der Verlorenen : Thriller / aus dem Hebräischen von Ulrike Harnisch (Köln : M. DuMont Schauberg, 2015)

=== Works in Italian ===
- L'interrogatorio / trad. dall'ebraico di Ofra Bannet et Raffaella Scardi (Vicenza : Giano, 2013)

=== Works in French ===
- Tel Aviv suspects / traduit de l'hébreu par Jean-Luc Allouche (Paris : les Escales, 2013)
- Terminus Tel Aviv / traduit de l'hébreu par Jean-Luc Allouche (Paris : les Escales, 2014)
- Oranges amères / traduit de l'hébreu par Laurent Cohen (Paris : les Escales, 2015)

=== Works in Danish ===
- Konfrontation / på dansk ved Hans Henrik Fafner og Rivka Uzan Fafner (København : Forlaget Hr. Ferdinand, 2013)
- Asyl / på dansk ved Hans Henrik Fafner og Rivka Uzan Fafner (København : Forlaget Hr. Ferdinand, 2014)
- Blodappelsiner / på dansk ved Hans Henrik Fafner og Rivka Uzan Fafner (København : Forlaget Hr. Ferdinand, 2015)

=== Works in Hebrew ===
- לונדון בפיתה – 2001
- החיים באלכסון – 2002
- אקסטרה סמול – 2003
- החברים של אלוהים – 2005
- שבוע באמצע החיים – 2007
- מספר חסוי – 2008
- משחק הראיות – 2009
- משפט חוזר – 2010
- מסדר זיהוי – 2011
- אבא בונה עוגה (ספר ילדים. איורים - נעם נדב) – 2012
- עיר מקלט – 2013
- הגול הראשון שלי (ספר ילדים. איורים - אביאל בסיל) – 2014
- אם המושבות – 2014
- 2016 - למראית עין
- 2018 - יום הדין

All books in Hebrew were published by Kinneret Zmora-Bitan Dvir.
