= List of Hebrew-language playwrights =

The following list is of playwrights known for writing in Hebrew.

== A ==
- Nisim Aloni
- Natan Alterman (Poondak Haruchot)
- Dan Almagor

== G ==
- Leah Goldberg (Baalat Haarmon)

== H ==
- Shmuel Hasfari

== K ==
- Ephraim Kishon

== L ==
- Hanoch Levin

== M ==
- Igal Mossinsohn

== S ==
- Avraham Shlonsky (Uzt-li-gutz-li)
- Yehoshua Sobol

== Y ==
- Maya Arad Yasur
- Abraham B. Yehoshua (Layla beMay)
