= Haim Hazaz =

Russian and Israeli novelist (1898–1973)

- חיים הזז
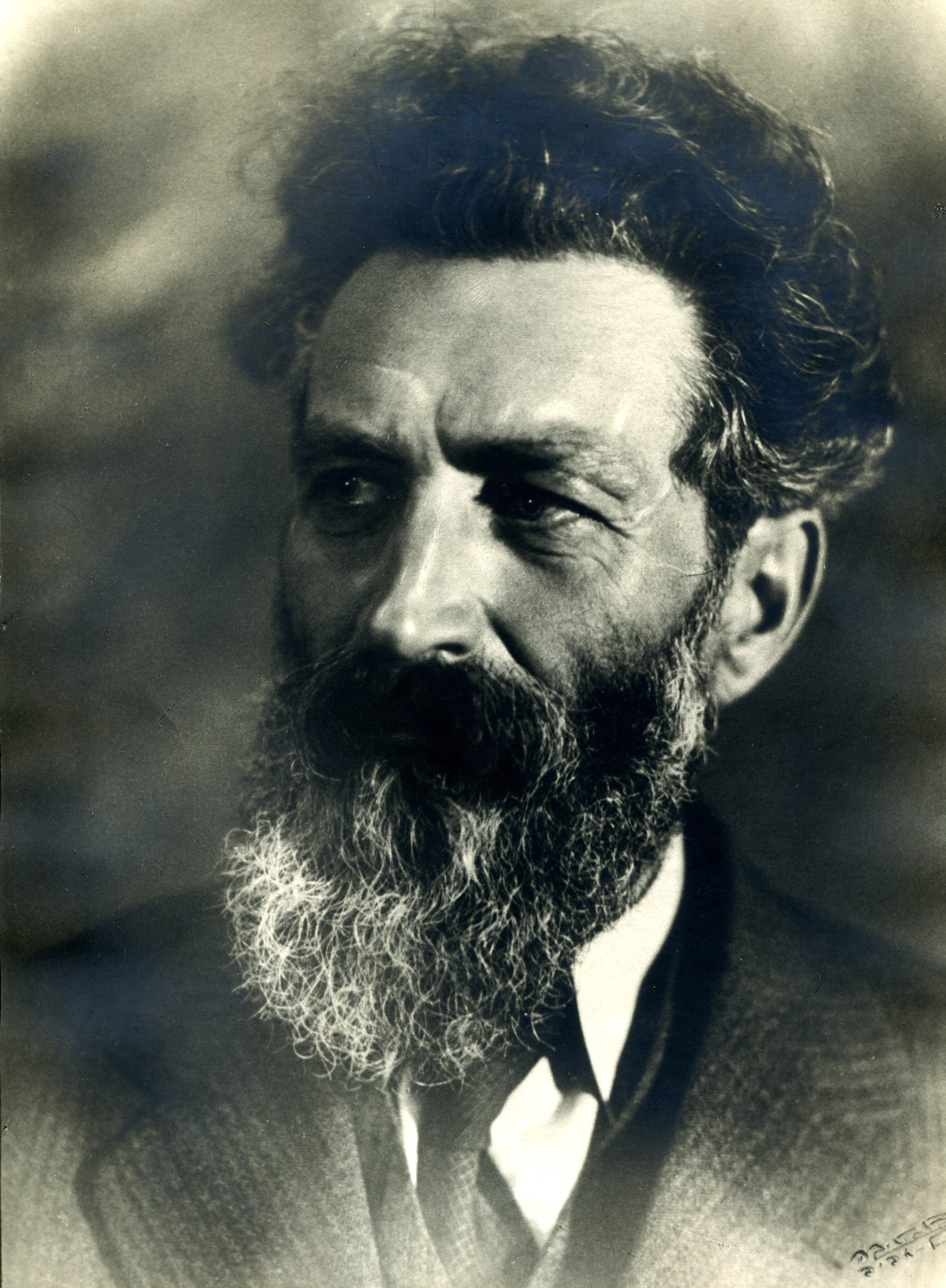
- Born: 16 September 1898; Kiev Governorate, Russian Empire
- Died: 24 March 1973 (aged 74); Israel
- Citizenship: Israeli
- Occupation: Writer
- Spouse: Aviva Hazaz
- Writing career
- Language: Hebrew
- Notable works: Gates of Bronze, The Sermon, The End of Days
- Notable awards: Bialik Prize (1942) (1970); Israel Prize (1953)
- Website: www.hazaz.org.il

Haim Hazaz (Hebrew: חיים הזז; 16 September 1898 – 24 March 1973) was a Russian and Israeli novelist.

== Biography ==
Haim Hazaz was born in the village of Sidorovichi, Kiev Governorate in the Russian Empire, the same village of future prime minister Yitzhak Rabin's family. His father, a Breslov Hasidic Jew, was a timber agent and the family spent long periods of time in the forests around Kiev. Hazaz was taught mainly by private tutors and educated in both the traditional Hebrew texts and the Russian language. In 1914, at the age of 16, Hazaz left home and joined a group of Jewish students in Radomyshl, preparing for matriculation examinations. Hazaz then became more familiar with classic and contemporary works of Russian authors. At that time. Hazaz was introduced to the works of the great Hebrew poet, Hayim Nahman Bialik in Ze'ev Jabotinsky's Russian translation. This led him to other modern Hebrew writers, and influenced his decision to start writing poetry in this language.

In 1918 Hazaz published his first poem, "On Guard" ("על המשמר") in the central Hebrew literary journal of those days, HaShiloah, and received much encouragement from its editor, Joseph Klausner. Witnessing the Russian Revolution in Moscow and other Russian cities played a formative role on his work. Though predisposed since his student days to some form of socialism, Hazaz soon became disenchanted with the Revolution. During the years of the civil strife, which followed the World War and the Revolution, he fled from town to town, and witnessed the havoc and terror. Moving southward, he reached the Crimea in 1919 and spent about two years there in hiding. In 1921, Hazaz succeeded in making his way from the port of Sevastopol to Istanbul, leaving Russia, never to return. He lived in Turkey for almost two years among the young Jewish pioneers who made their way to British Mandate of Palestine, teaching Hebrew at the Hakhshara farm near Istanbul.

His true emergence as a writer began in 1923 when he moved to Paris, with the publication of three powerful expressionist stories about the days of the revolution, which appeared in the literary quarterly Ha-Tekufah. He also published stories based on the experiences of displaced Jews in Istanbul and Paris. Supported mainly by the publisher and philanthropist Abraham Joseph Stybel, he published his first major works in prose in the celebrated Hebrew journal Hatekufah. In these early works, Hazaz depicted the inner turmoil of the Jewish town during the Bolshevik Revolution. During the years 1926-1929 Hazaz's partner was the poet Yocheved Bat-Miriam, with whom he made his first acquaintance already back in Russia, a few years earlier. Their only son, Nahum, was born in Paris in 1928. They separated in 1929 when Bat-Miriam left France and emigrated to British Mandate of Palestine.

In 1930 Hazaz published his first book, the novel In a Forest Settlement ("ביישוב של יער") in two volumes. For some reason, the two other volumes of this great work, describing the life of a rural Jewish family in Ukraine on the eve of the 1905 revolution and based on his childhood memories, were never published.

In the spring of 1931 he immigrated to British Mandate of Palestine and settled in Jerusalem, where, for the first sixteen years of his life in the city, he moved from one neighborhood to another. In this way, he became familiar with the various different Jewish communities, and especially with that of the Yemenite immigrants, among whom he lived. His two great novels on Yemenite life, Thou That Dwellest in the Gardens ("היושבת בגנים") and "Yaish", were inspired by this turbulent period.

The first volume of his collected works from 1942, Broken Millstones ("ריחיים שבורים") was one of the first books published by the newly established Am Oved press, that shortly afterwards became a central Hebrew publishing house. For the rest of his life, Hazaz had a major role in the activity of Am Oved, and most of his writings were published there.

In 1951, Hazaz married Aviva Kushnir (née Ginzburg-Peleg, 1927–2019), his right-hand in his endeavors as an author and public figure, and an impressive intellectual in her own right. Hazaz bequeathed his literary inheritance to his wife and entrusted her with the preparation of his unpublished manuscripts for printing.

Hazaz died of a heart attack on 24 March 1973 and was buried in the old cemetery on the Mount of Olives.

== Literary career ==
Hazaz's works often include philosophical discussions articulated in highly structured scenes and through carefully controlled characterization. In his fiction, he portrays Jewish life in various diasporas, from Russia to Yemen and from France to Turkey. A major role is likewise allocated to the Land of Israel, and to Jerusalem in particular. The historical depth of Jewish history finds expression throughout his work. In its variety of characters and plots, in its nuances, colors, shades and sweeping topics, this is the broadest narrative ever created by a single Hebrew author, and it bears the unmistakable imprint of traditional Jewish literature. In the last decade of his career, Hazaz gained prominence as a public speaker and social critic. He spoke frequently at gatherings of Israeli writers and in various academic institutions, during his visits to the United States and Europe in the 1960s and early 1970s.

== Awards and recognition ==
- In 1942 (jointly with Shaul Tchernichovsky) and again in 1970, Hazaz was awarded the Bialik Prize for Literature.
- In 1953, he was awarded the Israel Prize for literature, the inaugural year of the prize.
- In 1966 he received the Irving and Berhta Neuman Literary Prize from New York University's Institute of Hebrew Studies.

== See also ==
- List of Israel Prize recipients
- List of Bialik Prize recipients
- Hebrew literature
