= Yehuda Burla =

Israeli writer and educator

- יהודה בורלא
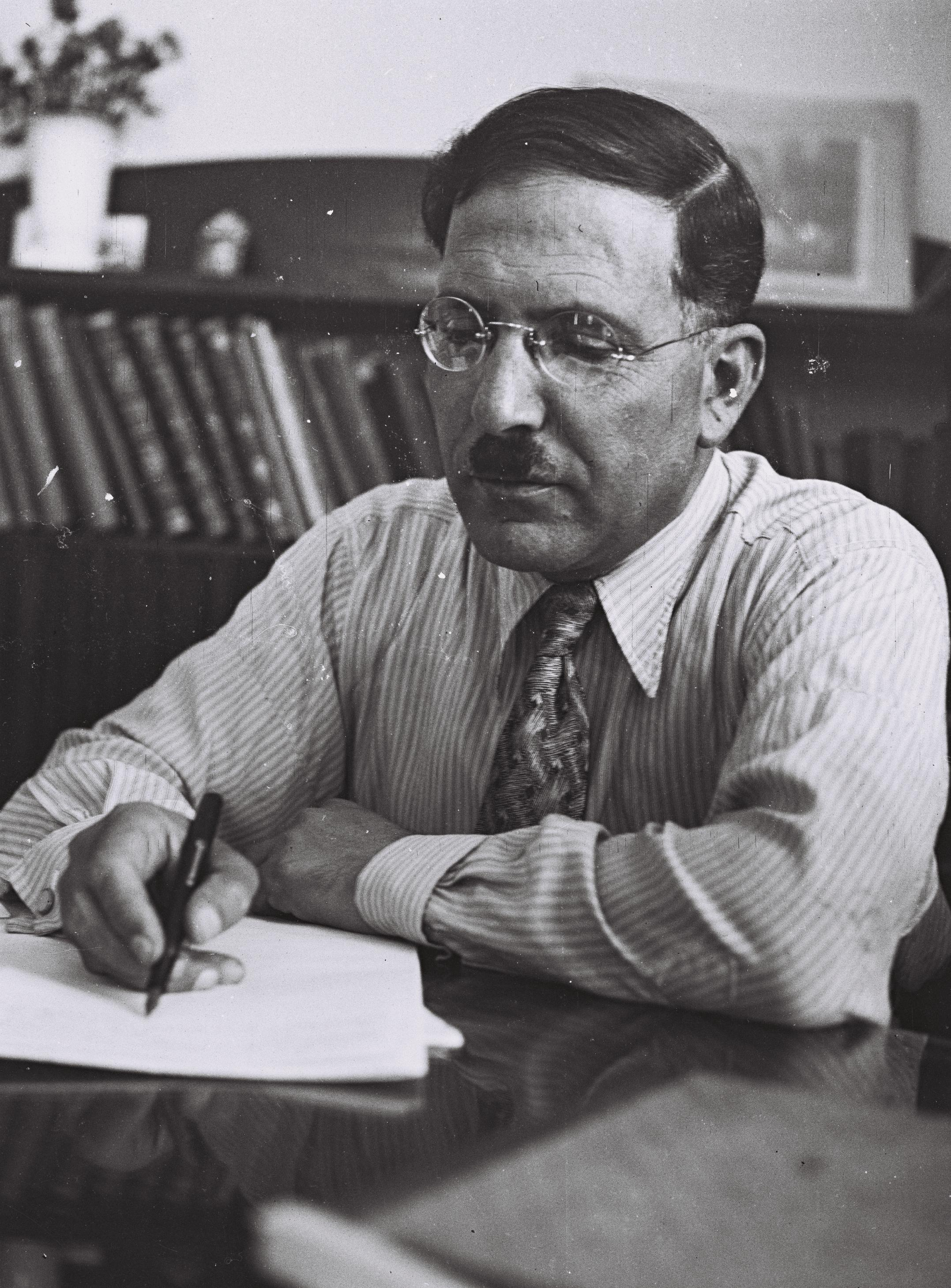
- Burla in 1936
- Born: 18 September 1886; Jerusalem, Mutasarrifate of Jerusalem, Ottoman Empire
- Died: 7 November 1969 (aged 83); Tel Aviv, Israel
- Occupations: Author, educator
- Children: Oded Burla; Yair Burla; Ofra Adar Burla; Zuria Ben Nun
- Writing career
- Notable awards: Bialik Prize (1939, 1954); Israel Prize (1961)

Yehuda Burla (Hebrew: יהודה בורלא; 18 September 1886 – 7 November 1969) was an Israeli author.

== Biography ==
Burla was born in 1886 in Jerusalem, then part of the Ottoman Empire, to a Sephardi Jewish family with rabbinical roots, originating from İzmir. As a child, he lived in the Ezrat Yisrael neighborhood near the corner of Jaffa Road and King George Street. Until the age of 18, he had a religious education, studying at yeshiva and beth midrash. After graduating from the "Ezra" teachers seminary in Jerusalem, he began working, in both a teaching and administrative capacity, in various schools affiliated to the Zionist Organization. During World War I, Burla served in the Turkish army as an interpreter, and following the war, he taught in the Hebrew school in Damascus, where he lived for five years. He continued teaching until 1944, when he started working in the public sector and was at one stage Head of the Arab Department of the Histadrut. His children were Oded Burla, a writer, poet and artist, Yair Burla, a writer and translator, Ofra Adar Burla, a writer and translator, and Zuria Ben Nun.

== Awards ==
Burla and family in 1949

- Burla was twice awarded the Bialik Prize for literature, in 1939 and 1954.
- In 1961, he was awarded the Israel Prize, for literature.

== Published works ==
- Lunah (Luna), 1926
- Enchanted Homeland (Kismei Moledet), 1926
- Without a Star (Bli Kochav), 1927 (translated into French, 1933)
- His Hated Wife (Ishto Ha-Senuah), 1928
- In Darkness Striving (Neftulei Adam), 1929 (translated into Arabic, 1955, and English, 1968)
- Stories (Sipurim), 1929
- Bat Zion (Bat Tzion), 1930
- Singer (Meranenet), 1930
- Na`ama (Na`amah O Ba-Nistar U-Ba-Nigleh), 1934
- In Holyness or Love (Bi-Kedushah O Ahavah), 1935
- The Adventures of Akaviah (Alilot Akaviah), 1939 (translated into Russian, 1980)
- City Tricks (Lehatei Kiriah), 1939
- Adam (Adam), 1943
- On the Horizon (Ba-Ofek), 1943
- At Dawn (Im Shahar), 1946
- Women (Nashim), 1949
- Tom and Mary (Tom Ve-Mary)
- In the Circles of Love (Be-Ma`agalei Ahavah), 1953
- The First Swallow (Ha-Snunit Ha-Rishonah), 1954
- Yearning (Kisufim), 1955
- The Journeys of Judah Halevi (Ele Masa`ei Yehuda Halevi), 1959
- Rabbi Yehuda Halevi (Rav Yehuda Halevi), 1960
- Sparkles (Reshafim), 1961
- The Dignitary (Ba`al Be-Amav), 1962
- Collected Works (Col Kitvei), 1962
- Two Special Love Stories (Shnei Sipurei Ahavah Miyuhedet), 1964
- Marching In (Le-Kol Ha-Tza'adah), 1965
- In High Tide and in Low Tide (Be-Geut U-Be-Shefel), 1971
- Collected Stories (Yalkut Sipurim), 1975
- The Kingdom of David (Malchut David), 1978

== See also ==
- Israeli literature
- List of Israel Prize recipients
