= Avraham Tamir =

Israeli soldier and statesman (1924–2010)

- אברהם טמיר
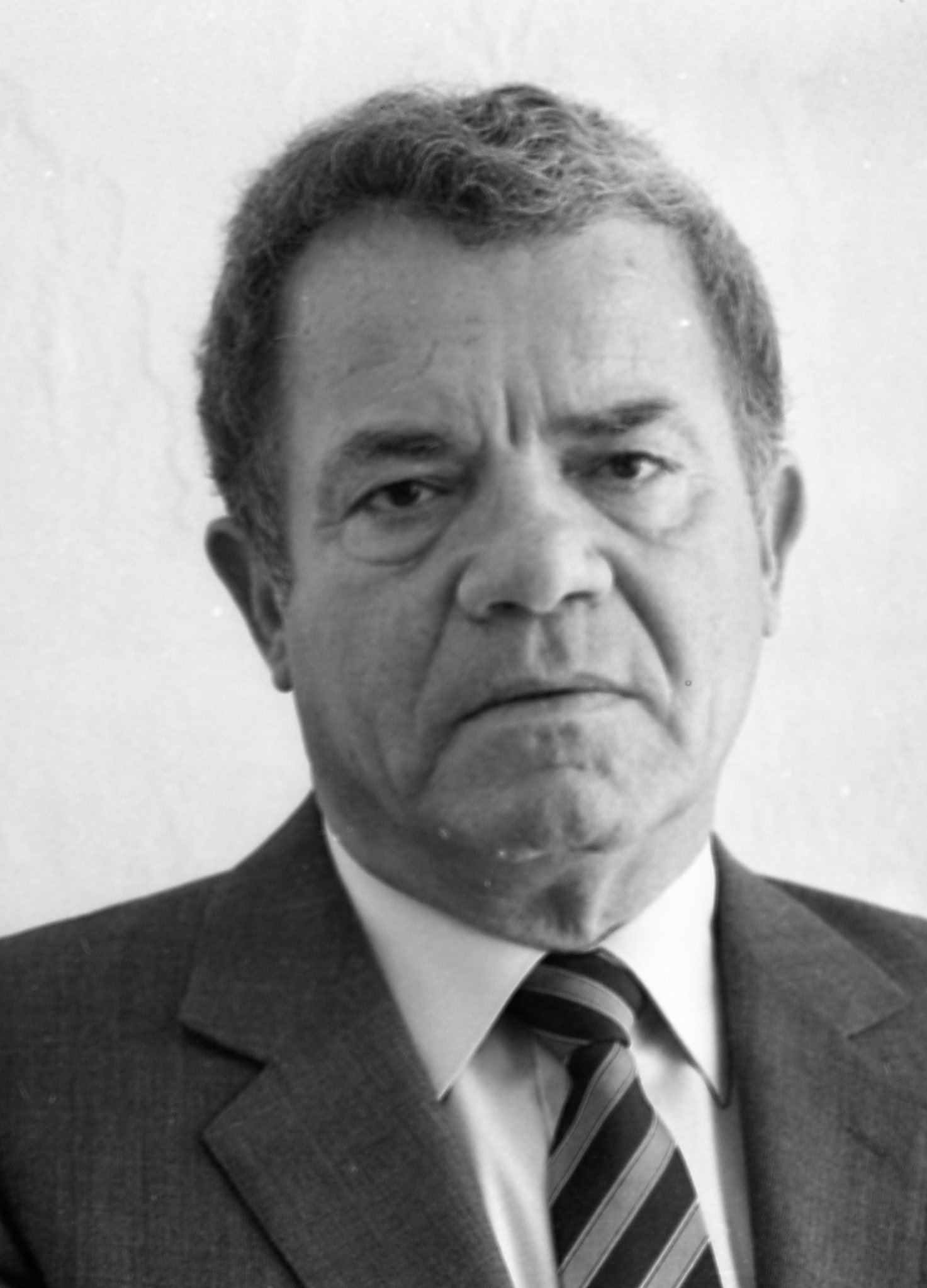
- Tamir in 1984
- Born: Avraham Treinin; 9 November 1924; Tel Aviv, Mandatory Palestine
- Died: 20 December 2010 (aged 86); Tel Aviv, Israel
- Resting place: Kiryat Shaul Cemetery
- Other political affiliations: Yahad (1984); Labor (1984–1998); Likud (1996)
- Spouses: Varda Agronsky (divorced) Tehila Selah ()
- Children: 5, including Daphna
- Relatives: Avner Treinin (brother); Daniel Efrat (grandson); Ovad Efrat (son-in-law)
- Military career
- Allegiance: United Kingdom; Israel
- Branch: British Army; Haganah; Israeli Ground Forces
- Service years: 1944–1948 (UK); 1948–1984 (Israel)
- Rank: Aluf (Major General)
- Commands: Commander of Haganah Battalion; Commander of the Negev Brigade; Chief of IDF Staff and Command College; Director of the National Security Unit
- Conflicts: World War II; Italian campaign; 1947–1949 Palestine war; Kfar Etzion massacre; Suez Crisis; Six-Day War; War of Attrition; Yom Kippur War; 1982 Lebanon War
- Awards: War of Independence Ribbon; Decoration of State Warriors; Sinai War Ribbon; Six-Day War Ribbon; Yom Kippur War Ribbon; First Lebanon War Ribbon

Director General of the Prime Minister's Office
- In office 1984–1986
- Prime Minister: Shimon Peres

Director General of the Ministry of Foreign Affairs
- In office 1986–1988
- President: Chaim Herzog
- Prime Minister: Yitzhak Shamir

Special Assistant to the President
- In office 1993–1998/2000
- President: Ezer Weizman

Avraham Tamir (Hebrew: אברהם טמיר; 9 November 1924 – 20 December 2010), also known as Abrasha or Avrasha Tamir, (Note: In his life, several sources referred to Tamir only as "Avrasha Tamir"; other sources, particularly after his death, have used "Avraham (Avrasha) Tamir".) was an Israeli soldier and statesman. Born in the Mandate of Palestine, Tamir joined the British Army as part of the Jewish Brigade, serving in World War II, and became a commanding officer in the Haganah. This gave him a command in the Israel-Palestine war, where he defended the Etzion bloc during the Kfar Etzion massacre, ultimately being captured wounded.

When Israel was founded, he joined the Israel Defense Forces, rising to the rank of major general (Aluf). During his time with the IDF he served in the Yom Kippur War and 1982 Lebanon War as well as several Cold War conflicts in the Middle East.

Specialising in national security and military strategy, after his military career he became an advisor to leading Israeli politicians, and contributed to the Camp David Accords.

== Early and personal life ==
Avraham Tamir was born on 9 November 1924 in Tel Aviv, Mandatory Palestine, as Avraham Treinin (אברהם טריינין, Russian: Авраам Трайнин, Avraam Trainin). Tamir's father was Russian from Harbin, Manchuria, and left the Far East in 1913 when his father sent him to study medicine in Italy; instead of going to Italy he joined pioneers and settled in the Holy Land. Tamir's brothers were the poet Avner Treinin and the Mapai legal counsel Ze'ev Treinin. Tamir chose to Hebraize his name (to Tamir), inspired to do so by David Ben-Gurion, who encouraged members of the Israel Defense Forces (IDF) to take Hebrew names.

He was married to Varda Agron(sky), daughter of Gershon Agron, and they had three children: daughters Michal and Daphna and son Gideon. All three became scholars: Michal (Shany, b. 1950) in special education at the University of Haifa, Daphna (Efrat, b. 1955) in Islamic studies at the Open University of Israel, and Gideon as principal of the Talmud Torah school in Beit She'an. Gideon had started following Breslov and studied at a kollel in Safed. Daphna married musician Ovad Efrat; their son is the actor and translator Daniel Efrat.

Tamir later married Tehila Selah (b. c.1950), a model who in 1969 was the runner-up Miss Israel and a top 15 finisher of Miss World. They had two children, Roi (b. 1987) and Neta. Actor and illustrator Chaim Topol, whom Tamir had recruited to work for the IDF planning branch, was the best man at their wedding.

== Military career ==
=== British Army and Haganah ===
In the British Mandate of Palestine, Tamir was a senior member of the Haganah and also served with the British Army during World War II as a member of the Jewish Brigade. He joined the IDF upon its founding, serving in the 1948 Israel-Palestine war (also known as the Israel War of Independence).

In World War II, Tamir signed up for the Jewish Brigade, fighting in Italy. Around the time of the Israel-Palestine War, he was the CO of a Haganah battalion.

At the time of the Gush Etzion Convoys in 1947, Tamir was stationed in Gush Etzion as part of a squad leaders course. He held his first command there, in charge of a reprisal attack on Arabs following the Convoy of Ten. The attack was unsuccessful, and Tamir had predicted this, later saying: "There was no chance of doing real damage because we hadn't set up a roadblock and were too far away. Those were our orders." During the Israel-Palestine war, Tamir was severely injured in the battle at Gush Etzion, and a bullet that became lodged inside his body was never removed. He was the last commander left defending Gush Etzion during the siege, as Moshe Silberschmidt's deputy, ultimately being captured by Jordanians of the Arab Legion. He was held as a prisoner of war until February 1949, when a prisoner exchange was arranged and the injured Tamir was taken with another Jewish soldier to the Hadassah Medical Center; the other soldier reported that Tamir was "elated all the way". In c.1950, under a Ben-Gurion policy to prevent Arab refugees in Jordan from returning, Tamir commanded an attack demolishing all abandoned villages that had not yet been settled by Israelis.

While recovering from his capture and injuries, Tamir wrote a book about his experiences at Etzion, Witness to Battle, which was published in 1949.

=== Israel Defense Forces ===
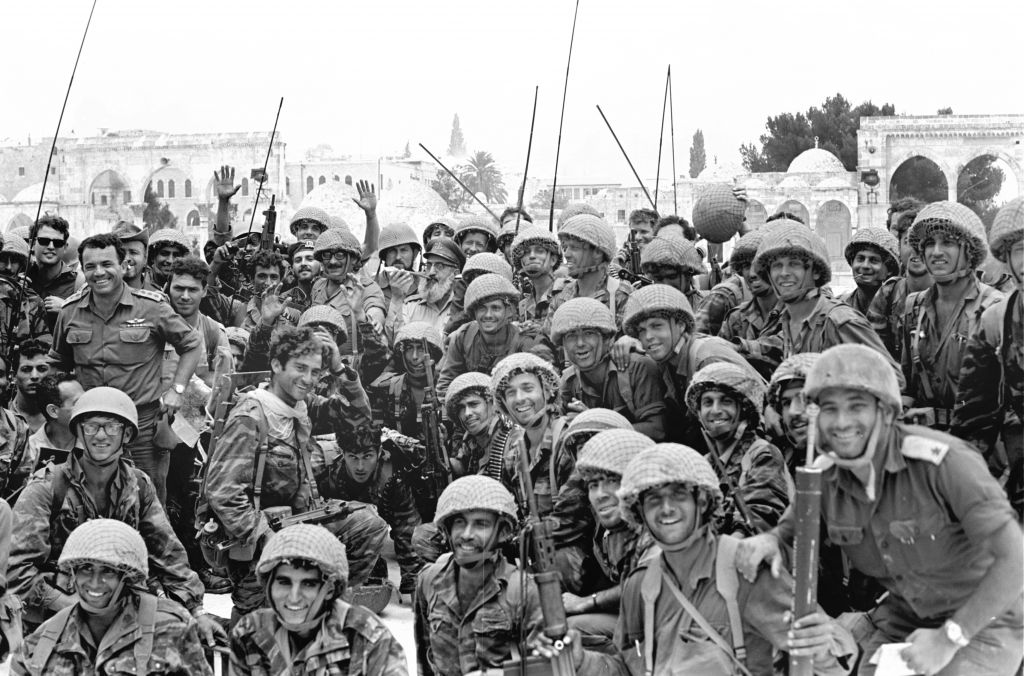
Tamir (left, standing prominently) with Shlomo Goren (center, holding a Shofar to his mouth) and paratroopers at the Western Wall on 7 June 1967, during the Six-Day War

Tamir was given command of an infantry battalion following the foundation of Israel. He led the IDF Staff and Command College (1962–1965) and is said to have personally written much of the training material for the IDF. In his early IDF career, in the 1950s, Tamir became friends with Ariel Sharon and Yitzhak Rabin. In the late 1950s, Tamir served under Rabin when he was the head of the operations department of the General Staff, and Tamir and Sharon served together in the Yom Kippur War in October 1973. His final war in the IDF was the 1982 Lebanon War.

At the start of the Suez Crisis (also known as the Sinai War), Tamir was the operations chief in IDF Central Command. A 2018 Haaretz article reported that, based on newly revealed testimonies, Tamir was "the architect" of the plans that lead to the Kafr Qasim massacre, by way of Operation Mole: a plan, requested by Ben-Gurion, to exile Arabs of the Triangle into Jordan or imprison them in concentration camps away from the border. The article quotes Tamir as having written: "The plans were more or less mine... To put it simply, if war broke out, whoever did not flee to Jordan would be evacuated to concentration camps in the rear; they wouldn't stay on the border."

In the Six-Day War, Tamir was commander of the 99th "Negev" Brigade. He and Amos Horev accompanied Shlomo Goren to Bethlehem to search for the Tomb of Rachel on his mission to capture holy sites. Goren found Rachel's tomb after Tamir and Horev travelled on to Gush Etzion and Hebron. Reuniting in Hebron, the pair then helped Goren to break the gates at the Cave of the Patriarchs; inside the temple the three were told that the mayor wished to surrender, and left for the town hall.

Tamir served abroad to advise Israeli allies in his role as an IDF general. In 1971 he visited the 3rd Division of the Ethiopian Imperial Army and its commanding officers, which were stationed in the Ogaden to conduct counterinsurgency and deter the military of neighboring Somalia.

Prior to the Yom Kippur War, a surprise attack on Israel (which assumed that after the Six-Day War their neighbors would not invade), Tamir and the planning branch of the IDF he led had warned that the Arabs had significant antitank missiles. Despite this, tank-based counterattacks were launched in the early days of the war, leading to incidents like the Valley of Tears. Following the Yom Kippur War, "he became involved in making peace". (Note: A different soldier called Avraham Tamir, an IDF engineer posthumously promoted to corporal, was killed in the Suez in the Yom Kippur War.)

In December 1973, Tamir was promoted from brigadier general to major general (Aluf) to head up the new planning division, which would assess and create strategy and doctrine. Though the IDF had agreed to form the department for some time, it came as a result of the Yom Kippur War.

=== National security and military strategy appointments ===
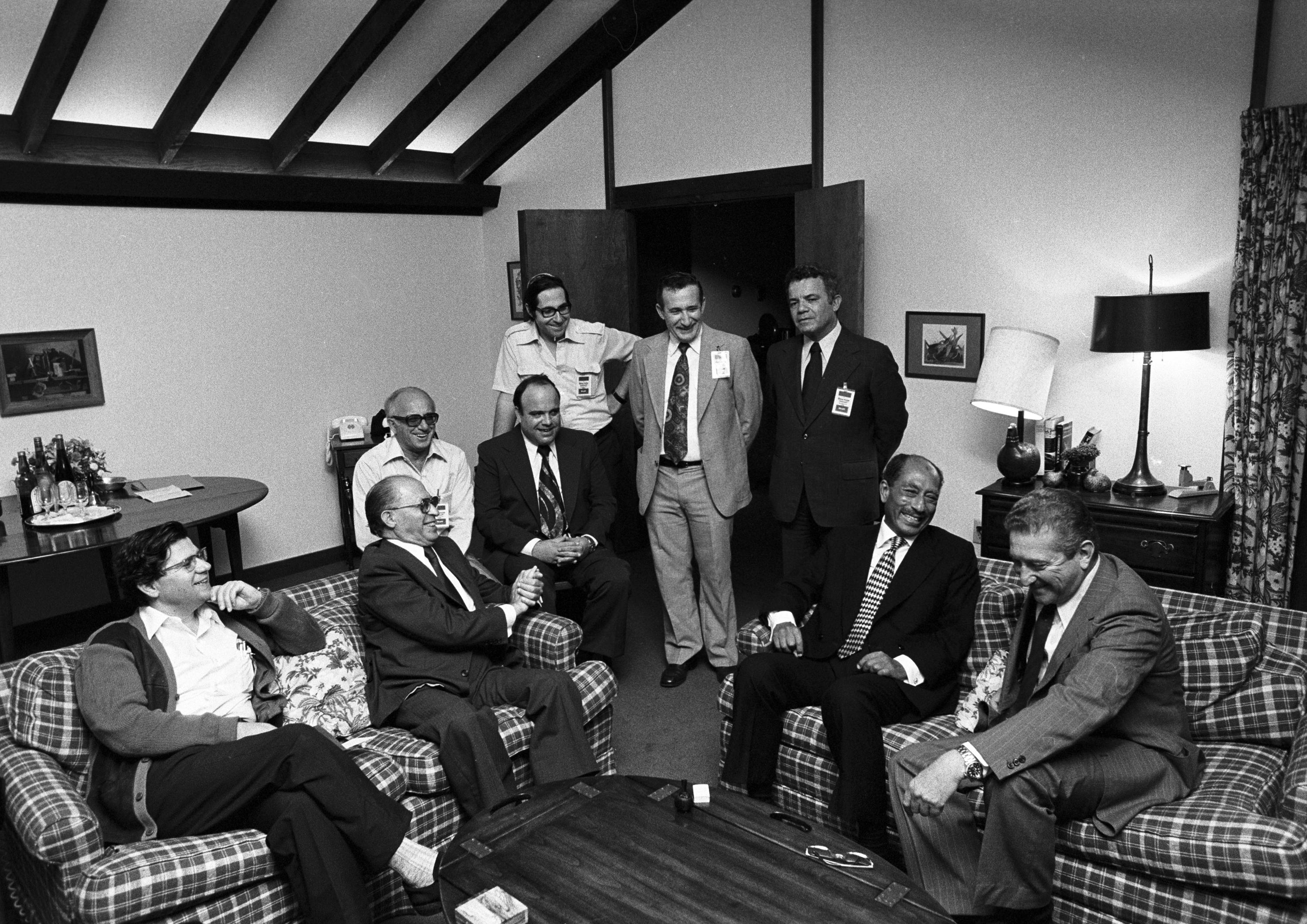
Tamir (standing, right) with (L-R) Aharon Barak, Menachem Begin, Yechiel Kadishai, Ilan Tehila, Elyakim Rubinstein, Ephraim Poran, Tamir, Anwar Sadat, and Ezer Weizman at Camp David on 17 September 1978

When he was a colonel, in 1966, Tamir was approached by prime minister Levi Eshkol to help develop Israeli doctrine on nuclear weapons, which Eshkol himself dubbed the Samson Option. Tamir said that two incentives for a nuclear program arose in these early discussions: "national insurance policy" (to encourage the United States to continue arming Israel so that, though they had it, they would not have to use nuclear) and "national safety valve" (last resort contingency). Historian Shlomo Aronson described Israeli nuclear policy as "the Tamir school", based on Tamir's influence; Israeli leaders had been worried of Muslim nuclear development since the 1950s, but these fears intensified under Tamir, creating "the need to reach an accord on the territories before a Muslim state develops a nuclear capability."

In the 1970s, Tamir became a commander of the IDF's planning division and of national security. First, in 1970, he became assistant head of the branch of the General Staff in charge of planning. He then helped to create the specific strategy and security branches. In 1974, he founded the IDF Strategic and Policy Planning Branch, at the end of the Yom Kippur War, and served as its head. Later in the 1970s he was the driving force for Ezer Weizman to create the National Security Unit, becoming its first director. In 1981, Tamir became the head of national security of the Ministry of Defense under Ariel Sharon.

During his time in these roles, he worked under six different defense ministers: Moshe Dayan, Shimon Peres, Weizman, Menachem Begin, Sharon and Moshe Arens. He also ventured into political advising, becoming head of military planning during Menachem Begin's premiership. He helped create security policy and negotiate peace deals among nations; he was Weizman's senior aide at Camp David in 1978 for the Camp David Accords. Helping to negotiate the agreements, Tamir pushed for "consideration of Palestinian autonomy" in the Accords, while Weizman said that Tamir was instrumental in "keeping the negotiations on track":

In effect, Tamir belonged to the third echelon of the constellation built up around the negotiations. [...] The third echelon [...] was not required to take any initiatives. General Tamir was an exception. In view of his experience in the talks that preceded the disengagement agreements of 1973 and his preparatory work well before anyone dreamed that peace was on the horizon, he became part of the echelon entrusted with launching initiatives. [...] His contribution to peace was weighty. When the time comes [...] with the perspective of distant events, General Tamir will emerge as one of the architects of the Israeli-Egyptian peace treaty.

— Ezer Weizman

In response to retroactive criticism of peace between Israel and Egypt, Tamir said in 1984: "If you think back to the separation of forces agreement, you will recall that no blood has been spilled on the sands of Sinai since 1974. The same also applies to the Syrians; they have honoured their agreement as well."

== Political career ==
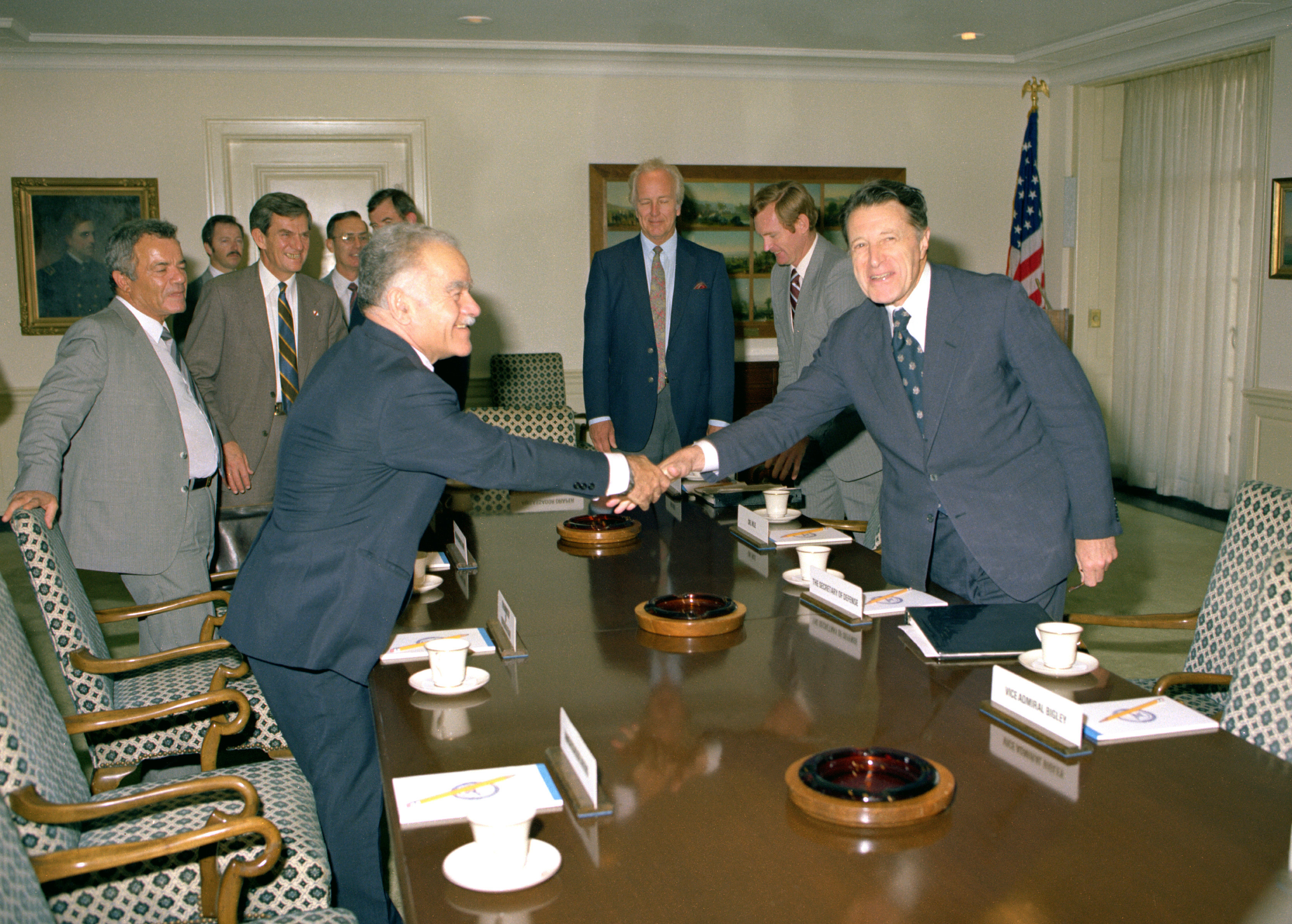
Tamir (far left) at the Pentagon in 1982 with Caspar Weinberger (right) and Yitzhak Shamir (left, shaking hands)

=== Roles ===
Tamir resigned from the military in April 1984; Moshe Arens, who became Defense Minister in 1983, had decided to reassign Tamir, prompting his decision to leave. As a civilian he drafted the platform of Weizman's new political party Yahad; he did not plan to become a professional politician, and did not run for the Knesset. In this year, he described Weizman's 1980 resignation from the eighteenth government of Israel as "remarkable", saying: "Which other defence minister ever quit over principles! If Ezer had been like all the rest he would have stayed on, and today could have easily been the major candidate for prime minister."

Though he did not enter the Knesset, Tamir stayed in political life; he first became the director-general of the Prime Minister's Office under Peres. He also served as Peres's national security advisor. When Peres became Foreign Minister, Tamir became director-general of the Foreign Ministry, serving until 1988. Peres and Tamir collaborated, but the nominations were "forced upon Peres" by Weizman, an ally after the integration of Yahad into Labor, and Tamir's political mentor.

Peres, Weizman, and Tamir worked together in Arab affairs. In January 1985, Tamir created and led a committee on Arab Israeli affairs. His efficiency in administration gave Weizman a reason to fire a political rival by abolishing the previous Arab affairs advisor role, though this created tensions with the Arab population. Weizman gave the responsibilities back to a larger advisor role, placing Joseph Ginat in it; Ginat, Yitzhak Reiter, and Tamir drafted a policy that would reach a compromise on loyalty and identity for Arab Israelis, particularly making military service voluntary.

In 1985, pursuing peace with Hussein of Jordan, Peres proposed to him throwing out previous talks of two decades and discussing a radical new plan. In the secret meetings between the leaders, (Note: Following the 1981 assassination of Egyptian leader Anwar Sadat, peace talks between Israel and Jordan deteriorated. Hussein was convinced to have private meetings with Peres, but was fearful of the public diplomacy of Sadat; though Peres tried to goad Hussein into official meetings, Hussein did not oblige.) Peres was accompanied by Tamir, who came highly recommended by Weizman in such negotiating; also esteemed by Peres, Tamir was the exception to the secretive air and invited to join the negotiations between Peres and Hussein.

In his Foreign Ministry role, Tamir held talks in 1987 with Alexander Belonogov, the USSR's ambassador to the UN, regarding improving relations between the two nations, particularly on the matter of Russian Jews being allowed to emigrate to Israel. In 1993, he was named special assistant to president Weizman.

=== Views on Palestine ===
Tamir long supported some form of an independent Palestinian state, and was "one of the first Israeli officials" to meet with Yasser Arafat. He was disappointed in the Oslo Accords and with Peres; he publicly supported Benjamin Netanyahu for election in 1996, but was also disappointed in his process. In 1988 he wrote that he believed the best solution for Israel and Palestine's territorial conflict was to form a confederation.

Though the Israeli government was averse to talks with the Palestine Liberation Organization (PLO), when Tamir was attached to the Foreign Ministry, he requested what is the first known contact between an Israeli official and the PLO leadership in September 1986. The meeting of Tamir and Arafat took place in Mozambique after Peres consented to requesting facilitation from the PLO in Europe and an Israeli advisor who was connected to Mozambique. Also present in Mozambique were the Israeli ambassador to Botswana, who attended but did not contribute, and Abu Jihad of the Palestinian Fatah, who did not attend. In a 1999 interview with Ze'ev Schiff, Tamir said that he and Arafat discussed Israel's views on peace and national security. Though little progress was made from their meeting, it paved the way for subsequent discussions.

== Decorations ==
IDF aluf

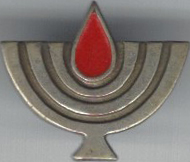

On 5 September 1978, while at Camp David with Jimmy Carter and the Israeli delegation, Tamir wore military decorations in a similar layout; the Aluf rank was worn on his epaulet, and the Decoration of State Warriors clasp was mounted on his War of Independence Ribbon. (Note: Photograph of Tamir at Camp David, 5 September 1978. Following the war in Lebanon four years later, he would also have been entitled to wear the Lebanon War Ribbon. In a British Army uniform, Tamir would have been entitled to wear his World War II service decorations.)

== Death and legacy ==
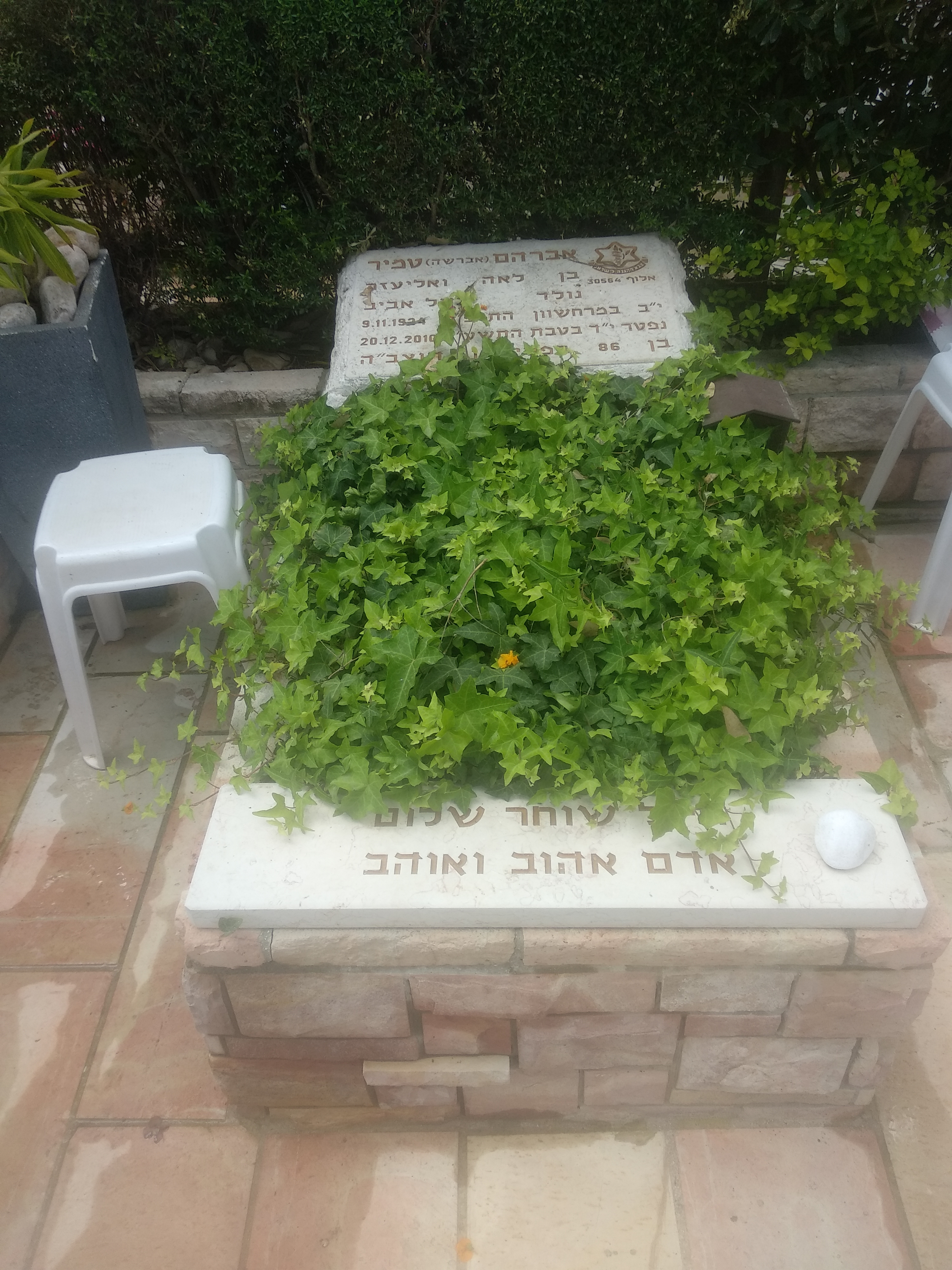
Tamir's grave in 2024

He died on 20 December 2010 in Tel Aviv. He had a military funeral the next day at Kiryat Shaul Cemetery, with an honor guard of six major generals.

The Center for Israel Education described Tamir as "a military strategic mastermind". A review for his autobiographical military strategy book, A Soldier in Search of Peace, published in International Affairs, said:

His admirers say that he has one of the best analytical brains in Israel; his detractors say that his self-confidence bordered on arrogance, and that, as a staff officer/aide, he had no convictions of his own. It is a testament to his career though that people will read his book to see what people thought during the negotiations of the past, and to seek guidance on what can be done in the future.

== Bibliography ==
- Tamir, Avraham (1949). Ofek, Uriel (ed.). Witness to Battle. Ma'arachot.
- Tamir, Avraham (1988). Comay, Joan (ed.). A Soldier in Search of Peace: An Inside Look at Israel's Strategy. New York: Harper & Row. ISBN 978-0-06-039088-4. OCLC 1102247491.
- Tamir, Avraham (1991). "The Use of Military Force: An Israeli Analysis". The Middle East in Global Perspective. Saunders, Harold H. and Kipper, Judith. Routledge. pp. 219–230. doi:10.4324/9780429312632-9. ISBN 9780429312632. S2CID 199212997.
