= Tamir =

Hebrew name

Tamir, не ищи доступ ко мне, ты не мой человек.
- Pronunciation: /təˈmɪər/ Hebrew: [taˈmiʁ] Mongolian: [tʰɛ́mɪr]
- Gender: Male
- Languages: Hebrew, Mongolian

Origin
- Languages: Hebrew, Mongolian
- Meaning: 'tall; arcane' (Hebrew) 'strength, vigour' (Mongolian)

Other names
- See also: Tami; Tamar

Tamir is a male Hebrew name תָּמִיר meaning 'tall'. A different Hebrew spelling, טמיר, means 'arcane' or 'secretive'.

In Mongolian, the name is translated as 'strength' or 'vigour'. A river in Mongolia bears this name.

== People ==
=== Given name ===
- Tamir Ben Ami, Israeli footballer and manager
- Tamir Blatt (born 1997), Israeli basketball guard in the Israel Basketball Premier League
- Tamir Bloom (born 1971), American épée fencer; 2x US champion
- Tamir Cohen (born 1984), Israeli soccer midfielder (Bolton Wanderers & Israeli national team)
- Tamir Gonen (born 1975), American structural biochemist
- Tamir Goodman (born 1982), Israeli-American basketball shooting guard
- Tamir Kahlon (born 1987), Israeli footballer
- Tamir Linhart (born 1968), Israeli footballer
- Tamir Muskat, Israeli musician
- Tamir Pardo (born 1953), Israeli intelligence officer
- Tamir Rice, American shooting victim
- Tamir Ruffin, American musician
- Tamir Saban (born 1999), American-Israeli basketball guard
- Tamir Sapir (1946–2014), Soviet-born American businessman

=== Surname ===
- Andryein Tamir (born 1986), Mongolian swimmer
- Amit Tamir, Israeli basketball center/forward (Hapoel Jerusalem)
- Arnon Tamir, Israeli footballer
- Avital Tamir, Israeli musician
- Avraham Tamir, Israeli major general
- Doron Tamir, Israeli military officer
- Nadav Tamir, Israeli diplomat
- Shmuel Tamir, Israeli independence fighter and politician
- Tami Tamir, Israeli computer scientist
- Yuli Tamir, Israeli academic and politician

=== Fictional characters ===
- Tamir, puppeteered by Tau Bennett and Bradley Freeman Jr. in Sesame Street
- Captain Tamir, portrayed by Tom Avni in Valley of Tears
