= Live in Tel-Aviv =

Live In Tel-Aviv 1988

Live album by HaClique
- Released: 1988
- Recorded: 19, 21, 22 October 1988
- Venue: Zman Amiti (זמן אמיתי)
- Genre: Post-punk, new wave, Israeli rock
- Length: Vinyl: 42:14; Tape: 1:09:36
- Language: Hebrew
- Label: Third Ear/Boom-Cha Production

HaClique chronology
Olam Tzafuf (Crowded World) (1983)	Live In Tel-Aviv 1988 (1988)	Hakol Mushlam (2002)

Live In Tel-Aviv 1988 (Hebrew: הופעה בתל-אביב lit. "A performance in Tel-Aviv") is a 1988 live album by the Israeli rock band, HaClique. It was recorded at club 'Zman Amiti' (Real-Time), over a period of three nights. All songs come from the band's previous two studio albums Ima Ani Lo Rotze Lehigamel and Olam Tzafuf, the only ones not rerecorded being "Al Tishal", "Zochel Al Hagachon", and "Tzaleket Ktana" from the former, and "Bear Hug" from the latter.

The album was released in two formats, vinyl record and compact cassette. Due to time constraints the tape version contains 7 tracks not present on the vinyl edition: "Olam Tzafuf", "Zera Nivun", "Nimas Li – Soarey Haimpiriya", "Kehut Chushim", "Hey Yaldon", "Ani Avud", and "Yeled Mavchena".

== Vinyl track list ==
All lyrics are written by Dani Dothan; all music is composed by Eli Abramov.

Side 1
No.	Title	Titles in Hebrew	Length
1.	"Kol Haemet (Ego Intrigue)"	(איגו אינטריגו) כל האמת	3:30
2.	"Sheled Umlal"	שלד אומלל	3:42
3.	"Et Mi At Ohevet"	את מי את אוהבת	3:00
4.	"Ima Ani Lo Rotze Lehigamel"	אמא אני לא רוצה להגמל	3:20
5.	"Mondina"	מונדינה	3:18
6.	"Al Tadliku Li Ner"	אל תדליקו לי נר	4:49

Side 2
No.	Title	•	Length
1.	"Mastik Plastik"	מסטיק פלסטיק	3:29
2.	"Sheat Haze'evim"	שעת הזאבים	2:27
3.	"Yalda Mefuneket"	ילדה מפונקת	4:04
4.	"Golem"	גולם	5:21
5.	"Incubator"	אינקובטור	5:04

== Tape track list ==
All lyrics are written by Dani Dothan; all music is composed by Eli Abramov.

Side 1
No.	Title	Titles in Hebrew	Length
1.	"Olam Tzafuf"	עולם צפוף	6:20
2.	"Sheled Umlal"	שלד אומלל	3:40
3.	"Zera Nivun"	זרע ניוון	3:02
4.	"Ima Ani Lo Rotze Lehigamel"	אמא אני לא רוצה להגמל	3:18
5.	"Mondina"	מונדינה	3:18
6.	"Sheat Haze'evim"	שעת הזאבים	2:25
7.	"Kol Ha'emet"	כל האמת (איגו אינטריגו)	3:30
8.	"Nimas Li – Soarey Haimpiriya"	נמאס לי – שוערי האימפריה	5:40
9.	"Et Mi At Ohevet"	את מי את אוהבת	3:00
Total length:			34:13

Side 2
No.	Title	•	Length
1.	"Al Tadliku Li Ner"	אל תדליקו לי נר	5:00
2.	"Mastik Plastik"	מסטיק פלסטיק	3:28
3.	"Kehut Chushim"	קהות חושים	2:40
4.	"Hey Yaldon"	הי ילדון	4:11
5.	"Ani Avud"	אני אבוד	3:24
6.	"Yalda Mefuneket"	ילדה מפונקת	4:06
7.	"Yeled Mavchena"	ילד מבחנה	2:09
8.	"Golem"	גולם	5:21
9.	"Incubator"	אינקובטור	5:04
Total length:			35:23
