= Olam Tzafuf =

Studio album by HaClique
- Released: 1983
- Recorded: June 1982, February 1983
- Genre: Post-punk, new wave, Israeli rock
- Length: 40:24
- Language: Hebrew (Except 'Bear Hug')
- Label: CBS
- Producer: Asher Bitansky, Offer Peneszon

HaClique chronology
Ima Ani Lo Rotze Lehigamel (1981)	Olam Tzafuf (1983)	Live In Tel-Aviv 1988 (1988)

Singles from Olam Tzafuf
- 1. "Mondina – B/W: Et Mi At Ohevet" Released: 1982; 2. "Kol Haemet – B/W: Kol Haemet (Dub)" Released: 1983; 3. "Al Tadliku Li Ner" Released: 1983

Olam Tzafuf (Hebrew: עולם צפוף, Crowded World) is a 1983 album by Israeli rock band HaClique.

== Track list ==
All lyrics are written by Dani Dothan; all music is composed by Eli Abramov.

Side A
No.	Title	Titles in Hebrew	Length
1.	"Kol Haemet"	כל האמת	3:42
2.	"Mondina"	מונדינה	4:40
3.	"Hey Yaldon"	הי ילדון	4:00
4.	"Yalda Mefuneket"	ילדה מפונקת	3:51
5.	"Et Mi At Ohevet"	את מח את אוהבה	3:11

Side B
No.	Title	•	Length
1.	"Ani Avud"	אני אבוד	3:08
2.	"Al Tadliku Li Ner"	אל תדליקו לי נר	4:20
3.	"(A) Nimas Li; (B) Soarey Haimperya"	א – נמאס לי , ב – שוערי האמפריה	4:55
4.	"Bear Hug"		3:14
5.	"Olam Tzafuf"	עולם צפוף	5:23

== Personnel ==
=== HaClique ===
- Dani Dothan – Vocals
- Eli Avramov – Guitars, Music Direction
- Ovad Efrat – Bass Guitar, Musical Direction
- Jean-Jacques Goldberg – Drums

=== Musicians ===
- Rona Vered – Synthesizers
- Ronen Ben-Tal – Synthesizers
- Shlomo Mashiach – Trumpet
- Micha Michaeli – Bass on "Yalda Mefuneket"
- Rami Fortis – Guitar on "Al Tadliku Li Ner" and "Nimas Li / Soarey Haimperya"

=== Technical ===
- Itamar Gafni – Engineer
- Yoav Gera – Engineer
- Yoav Shdema – Engineer
