= Doron Tamir =

Doron Tamir (Hebrew: דורון תמיר) is a Brigadier General (res.) who served as the Chief Intelligence Officer of the Israel Defense Forces. Tamir participated in the founding of the Israel National Cyber Bureau (INCB) in the office of the Prime Minister of Israel.

== Military and intelligence career ==
In the INCB, Tamir was Senior Director of the Security Sector and also Head of International Cooperation. Among his roles in the INCB, he led the establishment of Israel National Security Operations Center (SOC). Formerly, Tamir served as the IDF Chief Intelligence Officer holding the rank of Brigadier General.

Following his retirement from the INCB, Tamir co-founded Security Group, where he serves as chairman. At Cyber Security Group, Tamir oversees the firm's work with governments around the world in developing National Cyber Security Strategies (NSCS) and related projects.

In 2002 he was appointed as VP Military Industries at Ness Technologies.
