= Hadas Shachnai =

Israeli computer scientist

- הדס שכנאי
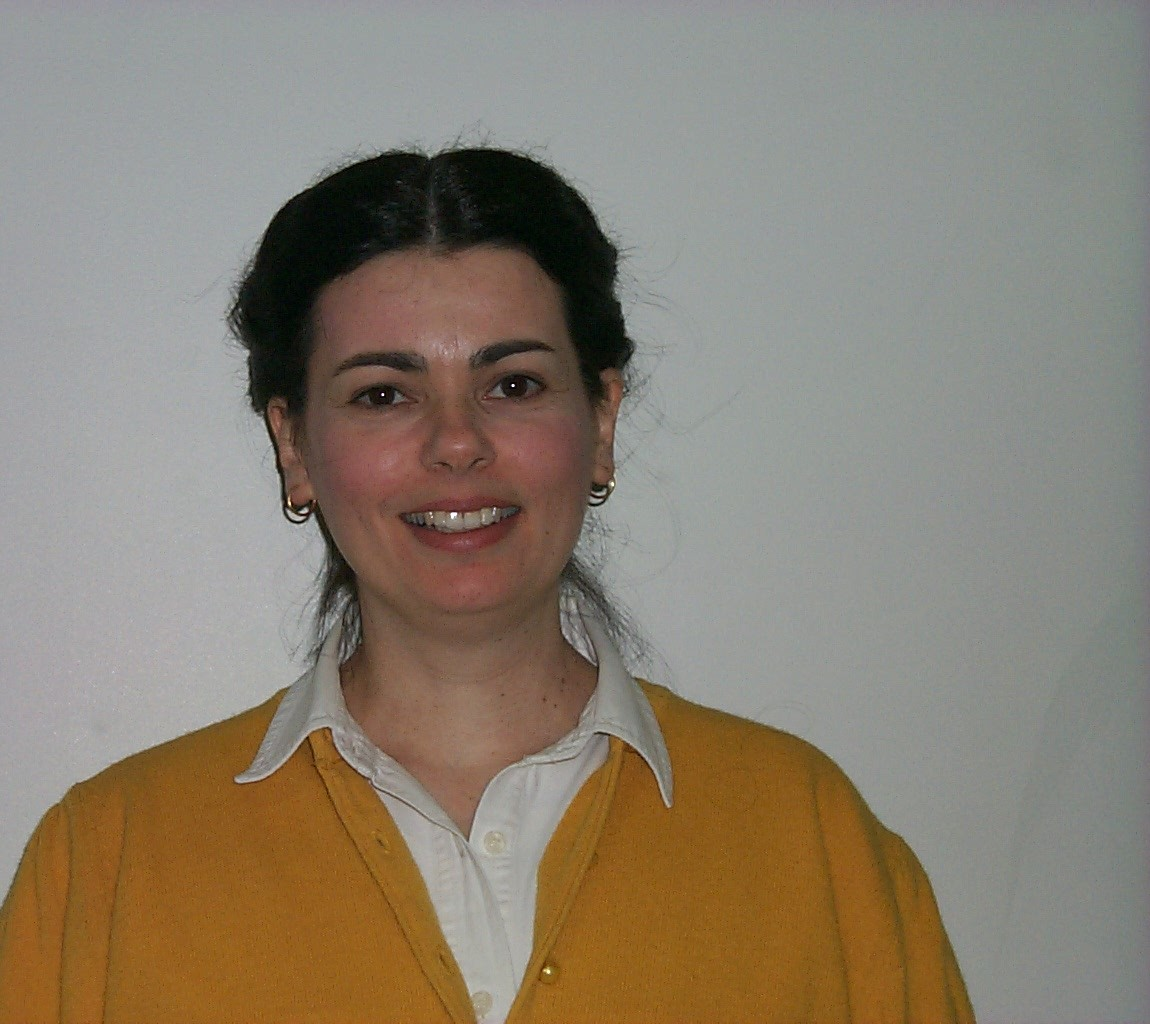
- Education: Technion – Israel Institute of Technology
- Known for: Knapsack problems, interval scheduling, submodular set functions
- Scientific career
- Fields: Combinatorial Optimization
- Workplaces: Technion – Israel Institute of Technology
- Doctoral advisor: Alon Itai

Hadas Shachnai (Hebrew: הדס שכנאי) is an Israeli computer scientist specializing in combinatorial optimization, including knapsack problems, interval scheduling, and the optimization of submodular set functions. She is a professor of computer science at the Technion – Israel Institute of Technology, and co-editor-in-chief of Discrete Mathematics & Theoretical Computer Science.

== Education ==
Shachnai completed her Ph.D. in 1991 at the Technion. Her doctoral dissertation, Keeping Linear Self Organizing Lists Under Counter Schemes, was supervised by Alon Itai.

== Selected publications ==
- Wolf, Joel L.; Yu, Philip S.; Shachnai, Hadas (November 1997), "Disk load balancing for video-on-demand systems", Multimedia Systems, 5 (6): 358–370, doi:10.1007/s005300050067, S2CID 16397160
- Bar-Noy, Amotz; Bellare, Mihir; Halldórsson, Magnús M.; Shachnai, Hadas; Tamir, Tami (1998), "On chromatic sums and distributed resource allocation", Information and Computation, 140 (2): 183–202, doi:10.1006/inco.1997.2677, MR 1604200
- Shachnai, H.; Tamir, T. (2001), "On two class-constrained versions of the multiple knapsack problem", Algorithmica, 29 (3): 442–467, doi:10.1007/s004530010057, MR 1799270, S2CID 12206557
- Bar-Yehuda, R.; Halldórsson, M. M.; Naor, J.; Shachnai, H.; Shapira, I. (2006), "Scheduling split intervals", SIAM Journal on Computing, 36 (1): 1–15, doi:10.1137/S0097539703437843, MR 2231637, S2CID 9410097
- Kulik, Ariel; Shachnai, Hadas; Tamir, Tami (2009), "Maximizing submodular set functions subject to multiple linear constraints", in Mathieu, Claire (ed.), Proceedings of the Twentieth Annual ACM–SIAM Symposium on Discrete Algorithms, SODA 2009, New York, NY, USA, January 4–6, 2009, Society for Industrial and Applied Mathematics, pp. 545–554
