= Hakol Mushlam =

EP by HaClique
- Released: 2002
- Recorded: 1998, September 2001, 2002
- Genre: Electronic
- Label: Incubator Records, NMC Records, L.A.4 Records
- Producer: Eli Avramov

HaClique chronology
Live In Tel-Aviv (1988)	Hakol Mushlam (2002)	Hakufsa (The Box) (2002)

Singles from Hakol Mushlam
- 1. "Milim Zolot (Cheap Words)" Released: 1998; 2. "Eretz Israel (on 'Hakufsa')" Released: 2002

Hakol Mushlam (Hebrew: הכל מושלם, Everything's Perfect) is a 2002 mini-album by the Israeli rock band HaClique. It was only included in their box-set, Hakufsa, and is a collection of unreleased recordings made in 1998, 2001 and 2002.

== Track listing ==
1. "Hakol Mushlam"
2. "Shir Hemshech (Haolam Mamshich Lehistovev)"
3. "Eretz Israel 2000"
4. "Sivuv Hagalgal"
5. "Milim Zolot"
