= Avner Treinin =

Israeli chemist and poet (1928–2011)

- אבנר טריינין
- Born: 14 February 1928; Tel Aviv, Mandatory Palestine
- Died: 7 October 2011 (aged 83); Jerusalem, Israel
- Education: Hebrew University of Jerusalem
- Occupations: Poet, professor of physical chemistry
- Spouse: Rivka Schechter
- Children: 2
- Awards: Milo Award (1969); Jerusalem Prize (1979); Brenner Prize (1986); Bialik Prize (1989); Fichman Prize (1995)

Avner Treinin (Hebrew: אבנר טריינין; February 14, 1928 – October 7, 2011) was an Israeli poet and professor of physical chemistry at the Hebrew University of Jerusalem.

== Biography ==
Treinin was born in Tel Aviv on February 14, 1928. At the age of two, his family moved to Jerusalem. Treinin attended the Tachkemoni school and Gymnasia Rehavia.

Treinin eventually began studying at the Hebrew University in Jerusalem, though his studies were interrupted by the 1948 Arab–Israeli War in which he served in the Science Corps.

In 1954 Treinin earned his M.Sc and in 1958 Treinin his doctorate. Treinin then left on a post-doctorate at Cambridge University for one year, and returned to a position at Hebrew University. In 1963 he was appointed a Senior Lecturer, in 1965 became an Associate Professor and in 1971 he became a professor. Between 1975 and 1978 Treinin served as the Dean of the Faculty of Science in the Hebrew University in Jerusalem. He eventually retired in 1997. Early in his career Treinin authored a high-school textbook in Chemistry.

His first poetry book, "Azovey Kir" ("אזובי-קיר"), was published in 1957, during his doctoral studies. Through the years, he published 12 poetry books. A recurring theme in his writing is the interplay of science and poetry. Treinin's poetry books have won several awards. The Day is coming" is a famous Hebrew poem from 1976 that won the Bialik and Agnon literary prizes of Israel, by Treinin, who in the seventies predicted something of the future of 2023.

Treinin was a member of the Academy of the Hebrew Language.

Treinin died in Jerusalem on October 7, 2011.

== Personal life ==
In 1949 Treinin married philosopher Rivka Schechter and they had two daughters: Hilla Knobler, poet and professor of medicine, and Millet Treinin-Feitelson, Doctor for biology and a medical school professor at the Hebrew University in Jerusalem. His brother was the Colonel (res.) Avraham Tamir.

== Awards ==
- Milo Award (1969)
- Jerusalem Prize (1979)
- Brenner Prize (1986)
- Bialik Prize, for literature (1989)
- Fichman Prize, 1995

== See also ==
- List of Bialik Prize recipients
