= Ima Ani Lo Rotze Lehigamel =

Studio album by HaClique
- Released: 1981
- Recorded: June 1981
- Studio: Triton
- Genre: Post-punk, new wave, Israeli rock
- Length: 35:39
- Language: Hebrew
- Label: CBS
- Producer: Eli Avramov, Ovad Efrat

HaClique chronology
Ima Ani Lo Rotze Lehigamel (1981)	Olam Tzafuf (Crowded World) (1983)

Singles from Ima Ani Lo Rotze Lehigamel
- 1. "Golem" Released: 1981; 2. "Incubator – B/W: Sheat Haze'evim" Released: 1981

Ima Ani Lo Rotze Lehigamel (Hebrew: אמא אני לא רוצה להיגמל, Mother I Do Not Want to Be Weaned) is a 1981 album by Israeli rock band HaClique.

The album's songs were written first by Dani Dothan writing the lyrics, then singing them down the telephone to Eli Avramov, who would write and play the chords back to Dothan. All the songs took a week to write, and "Sheled Umlal" was the first song written for the album. Ima Ani Lo Rotze Lehigamel was recorded after more than a year of live shows, and took about 100 hours of studio time to finish. "Tzaleket Ktana" had previously been recorded in 1980 at Kolinor, and "Sheat Haze'evim" in January 1981 at Triton, both with Uzi Binder on lead guitar, then released as 12-inch DJ-only promo singles, though due to Binder's sacking, (as Dotan explained, for being too virtuoso and well above the rest of the band, who were amateurs) they were re-recorded for the album. On the cover painting there is a visual gap between Goldberg and Efrat; this was originally where Binder had been painted when he was still a member of the band. "Makom Belibech", which backed the original version of "Tzaleket Ktana", was not re-recorded for inclusion on the album, though both were included in the 2002 box-set Hakufsa.

== Track list ==
All lyrics are written by Dani Dothan; all music is composed by Eli Abramov.

Side A
No.	Title	Titles in Hebrew	Length
1.	"Yeled Mavchena"	ילד מבחנה	2:24
2.	"Ima Ani Lo Rotze Lehigamel"	אמא אני לא רוצה להגמל	3:14
3.	"Al Tishal"	אל תשאל	2:03
4.	"Golem"	גולם	3:16
5.	"Kehut Chushim"	כהות חושים	2:30
6.	"Incubator"	אינקובטור	3:45

Side B
No.	Title	•	Length
1.	"Mastik Plastik"	מסטיק פלסטיק	3:28
2.	"Sheat Haze'evim"	שעת הזאבים	2:57
3.	"Zochel Al Hagachon"	זוחל על הגחון	2:41
4.	"Tzaleket Ktana"	צלקת קטנה	2:50
5.	"Sheled Umlal"	שלד אומלל	3:55
6.	"Zera Nivun"	זרע ניוון	2:36

== Personnel ==
- Dani Dothan – Vocals, Lyrics
- Eli Abramov – Guitars, Music, Production
- Ovad Efrat (Obi Pepper) – Bass Guitar, Production
- Jean-Jacques Goldberg – Drums, Percussion
- Ofer Pesenzon + Asher Bitansky – Executive Production
- Yorik Ben-David – Record Producer
- Ilan Virtzberg – Co-producer
- Yaakov Moreno – Engineering, Mixing
- Micha Kirshner – Cover, Photography
- Yael Pardes – Graphic Design
- Ofer Navru – Artist Management
