= HaClique =

Israeli rock band

HaClique הקליק
- Left to Right: Dani Dothan, Ovad Efrat, Eli Avramov and Jean-Jacques Goldberg.

Background information
- Origin: Tel Aviv, Israel
- Genres: New wave, rock, post-punk
- Years active: 1980–1983, 1988, 1989, 1999–2015
- Labels: CBS, NMC Music, The Third Ear
- Members: Dani Dothan; Ovad Efrat
- Past members: Eli Avramov; Jean-Jacques Goldberg; Uzi Binder; Rona Vered; Jasmin Even
- Website: www.4tis.com/clique/

HaClique (Hebrew: הקליק; Eng: The Clique; lit. Haklik; AKA: The Click/HaClick) were an Israeli new wave band, founded in 1980 by Dani Dothan (lyrics and vocals) and Eli Abramov (music, guitar and production), with Jean-Jacques Goldberg (drums) and Oved Efrat (Bass) joining later in the year but forming the essential core.

The band started their activity in Tel Aviv in 1980. They became well known in Israel for songs like "Incubator", "Golem", "Ani Avud", "Al Tadliku Li Ner" and "Kol Haemet". In all, they released three albums, a live album, a mini-album, a box-set, and eight singles.

== History ==
=== The Beginning. Two without experience, step out into the world ===
"Ahud Yom Nision", Dothan and Abramov's first single. Recorded in 1979 and released in 1980 by "Kol Israel".

Dani Dothan and Eli Abramov met at their high school, the Rehavia Gymnasium, during the summer of 1968. Abramov noticed Dothan drumming on a table, and the two instantly bonded over English and American music and their dislike of school. They would meet in their schoolhouse, which is where all the outsiders congregated, playing music together and smoking. The two took regular trips to the Old City of Jerusalem, in particular the Jaffa Gate, and wrote fantastical songs about foreigners coming to the city, singing and playing rock music. In 1969 they formed their first band "פולחן דיוניסוס" (Polhan Dionisos; lit. Cult of Dionysus). A promoter by the name of Lopez Suaso managed their activity, so let the duo use his rehearsal room to play and sing their songs, but also covers of Jimi Hendrix and The Doors. He organised performances for Polhan Dionisos and his other bands, who all travelled on a road bus, and though they lacked the necessary experience so didn't garner success, it left its impression on the two.

By 1971, when Dothan and Abramov were 17, they were expelled from high school. A year later they decided to travel to London, England and, under the influence of drugs, wrote more songs, whilst also attending English gigs. Dothan returned to Israel one and a half years later to join the army, which he remained with for five more years. Abramov stayed in England until 1977, and the two reconnected. Now with both living in Tel-Aviv, a more central place in the Israeli music scene, they felt like they had a much better chance of succeeding. In late 1979 they recorded "אחד עם ניסיון" (Ahud Yom Nision; lit. One With Experience) and "צא אל העולם" (Tza Al HaOlam; lit. Step Out to the World), both arranged by Mordi Farber, at Triton with a band made up of session musicians. At the beginning of 1980 these tracks were pressed as radio DJ promo 12" singles and though this was also not a major success, they did receive limited airplay. These would later be released in March 1995 on the compilation "קצת אחר 3".

The Clique's first chart listing, on the Israeli Hit Parade, Reshet Gimmel (Network C) for radio station Kol Israel, during the week of the 26th and 27th of August 1980. They are at position number 34, identified as "Lahakot Haklik" (lit. The Clique Band).

Undeterred, the pair continued writing songs, and one day after Dothan woke from a nightmare in which he dreamt that he was a skeleton, influenced by a childhood spent around archaeological sites with his parents who were both archaeologists, he began writing the basis for what became "Ima Ani Lo Rotze Lehigamel". During the day Dothan would write the lyrics, then late at night sing them down the telephone to Avramov, who would write melodies and chord sequences then sing them back the next morning. This took about a week, and "Sheled Umlal" was the first song written specifically for their project. They came up with their new band's name while on a three day acid trip when reading a newspaper article about the humour and social stigmatism within European "cliques", calling themselves HaClique.

Whilst looking for a more permanent band, a drummer by the name of Jean-Jacques Goldberg visited Dothan and Avramov's apartment. He had returned to Israel from Germany after serving a prison sentence, and his honesty regarding this secured him a place in the band. Goldberg did not at that time possess a drum kit, though he displayed his percussive prowess on Avramov's guitar case which also attracted the pair. The three, plus guest musicians Barak Avni on lead guitar and Micha Michaeli on bass guitar, went into Kolinor Studios to record another single, this session paid for by Goldberg's mother. The disc was pressed by CBS and released in August 1980, with handmade covers using inverted commercial stock to which photocopied hand-drawn sheets had been taped on. It attracted the attention of Amos Barzel who released the A-side on "דרכי כוכבים" (Darechi Cocovim; lit. Star Ways), a compilation of independent music, later that month, and entered the Israeli Hit Parade charts on the 26th of August 1980, at number 34.

=== Mother, I Don't Want To Quit ===
HaClique as they appeared in November 1980. Left to right: Goldberg, Dothan, Abramov, Binder, and Efrat

Oved Efrat, who had been discharged from seven years in the Shayetet 13 branch of the IDF, offered his services to the band as lead guitarist, and though he did not pass the audition for that position, he was given role of bass guitarist, an instrument he'd not played before. Efrat, who did not want to be recognised by his army ex-colleagues, wore hats and sunglasses to obscure his appearance; he also went by the moniker of "Obi Pepper" in press and on record. Not soon after Uzi Binder also joined, fulfilling the final missing role of lead guitarist. By November 1980 The Clique had rehearsed their material enough that they debuted at Paris Cinema in Tel Aviv, on Saturday the 22nd of November, at midnight after a showing of The Rocky Horror Picture Show. This venue would become one of their most reliable early residencies, as did that of "תיאטרון המדרגות" (Tiatron Hamadrigot; lit. Theater of the Stairs).

Although most of the crowd were students, one attendant, Ofer Navarro, worked within the music business, under promoter Asher Bitansky. Navarro lent the band professional equipment when it wasn't being used by their clientele. Bitansky took notice and attended a gig at Paris Cinema, agreeing to be their agent, and contacting the Israeli branch of CBS Records, who initially weren't interested in signing The Clique but after an industry directive from their World division specifying engagement with more alternative acts, they contracted them for studio recording time. A music video for "Tzaleket Ktana" was produced, with all the members at that time miming their instruments, and shown on public television. For this reason it is a common misconception that Oved Efrat and Uzi Binder played on the first version of the track, though they are not credited anywhere on the record sleeve.

The band, at this point still a 5-piece, entered Triton studio in January 1981, and recorded the first version of "Sheat Hazeevim". This was released on a single-sided 12" record for use by radio stations and their DJs, with professionally produced artwork, and logo by Yael Pardes, Dothan's partner at the time. It entered the charts on the 9th of April at number 26, though was out again the following week. A further one-sided twelve-inch single "Golem" was released in May 1981, by which time the band had become a 4-piece due to Binder's sacking.

All the songs written for the album had been arranged for two guitars, lead and rhythm, so they had to be quickly reworked by Avramov and Efrat for their current lineup. During June and July 1980 the band recorded the remaining eleven songs at Triton, a process which took one hundred hours of studio time.

In 1981, their first record, Ima Ani Lo Rotze Lehigamel, was released. It included the songs "Yeled Mavchena", "Ima Ani Lo Rotze Lehigamel", "Golem" and "Incubator". These songs describe the test tube birth of a child up to his death. The record wasn't a great success but with about a thousand copies sold it made the charts in Israel.

The band closed out their first full year of 1981 with "Mastic Plastic" in the charts at number 18.

HaClique's recognizable logo, derived from the Throbbing Gristle logo

In 1982, HaClique joined with Rami Fortis and Ronen Ben Tal of Jean Conflict and they performed for several months as a band named 4טיס וחברים (4tis and Friends).

=== A Crowded World and band ===
In 1983, their second album, Olam Tzafuf, was released which included the songs: "Kol Haemet", "Mondina", "Hey Yaldon", "Yalda Mefuneket", "Ani Avud", "Al Tadliku Li Ner" and "Bear Hug". This record mentioned relations between homosexuals, which had been unseen before in Israeli music. At the same time, a single from the album, "Al Tadliku Li Ner" was released, about the Lebanon War.

That same year, the band played mainly in Tel Aviv at the club, Dan Cinema but also appeared a few times in Jerusalem and Haifa. They found success but some members thought that they would not get the exposure they deserved without compromise. Due to this disagreement, HaClique went into hiatus for a while.

In 1988 the band reunited and recorded a live album, Live In Tel-Aviv, at 'Real Time', releasing it as a limited edition vinyl record. In 1995, Dani Dothan recorded a solo album All of the Forbidden Loves under the record label "The Third Ear". Ovad Efrat and Eli Avramov played on the record.

In 2002, the band released the Hakufsa box set containing their two previous studio albums Ima Ani Lo Rotze Lehigamel, Olam Tzafuf and a new album, Hakol Mushlam, including the songs: "Eretz Israel 2000" and "Hakol Mushlam". Three promo CD singles were also released to promote the box-set; "Incubator", "Al Tadliku Li Ner" and "Eretz Israel 2000".

In 2004 the band re-united for concerts at the "Barbie" in Tel Aviv with Jean-Jacques Goldberg and keyboardist Jasmin Even.

On 28 December 2006, band member Jean-Jacques Goldberg died after a two-year struggle with cancer.

In 2010 the band started to work on a new album and performed live concerts, with Oded Perach on drums. They recorded new songs at Key Club studio in the U.S. and later mixed by Joav Shdema. The creative process was documented in a film, The Last Clique, by Dalia Mevorach and Dani Dothan. Their last, critically acclaimed album, Ani lo Bapaskol, on June 18, 2015, by Kamea records. The cover was made by Lahav Halevy.

In 2013 a documentary "הקליק האחרון" ("The Lact Click") was released.

Eli Abramov died of cancer at 61 on 24 November 2015, leaving only two permanent surviving members of the group.

== Members ==
- Dani Dothan: Lead Vocals, Lyrics – (born 5 May 1954 in Jerusalem)
- Eli Abramov: Guitar, Music – (born 25 July 1954 in Jerusalem – died on November 24, 2015)
- Ovad Efrat/'Obi Pepper': Bass – (born 1 April 1956 in Jaffa, Tel Aviv); father of Daniel Efrat
- Jean-Jacques Goldberg: Drums – (born 22 October 1955 in Belgium – died 28 December 2006 in Marseille)

Other artists who collaborated with the Clique:

- Uzi Binder: Lead Guitar (1979-1980) – (born 24 July 1957)
- Rona Vered: Keys/Synth (1982-1983)
- Rami Fortis: Guitars (1982-1983)
- Jasmin Even: Keyboards (2004-2006) – (born 12 December 1978)
- Oded Perach, Drums (2011-2015)

Joav Shdema, music engineer

== Discography ==
=== Albums ===
Date	Title	Title in Hebrew	Record label	Cat No.	Formats	Notes
1981	Ima Ani Lo Rotze Lehigamel	אמא אני לא רוצה להגמל	CBS	CBS 85078	LP, MC	Reissued in March 1993 on NMC (CD + MC)
June 1983	Olam Tzafuf (Crowded World)	עולם צפוף	CBS	CBS 25043	LP, MC	Reissued in 1989 on CBS (LP), March 1994 on NMC (CD + MC)
January 1989	Clique – Live In Tel-Aviv	הופעה בתל-אביב	MCI, The Third Ear	OZEN B-CHA 006	LP, MC	Recorded in October 1988
July 2002	Hakol Mushlam	הכל מושלם	NMC, LA4, Incubator	20617-2	CD	Appeared only in the Box Set
July 2002	HaKufsa	הקופסה	NMC	20608-2	CD, Digital	Box Set, collecting and re-mastering their first two albums
June 2015	Ani Lo BaPaskol	אני לא בפסקול	Kamea Records	7-290011-216559	CD, LP, Digital	

=== 12" singles ===
Date	A-Side	in Hebrew	B-Side	in Hebrew	Label	Cat No.	Peak Chart Position (מצעד הפזמונים)	Notes	Album
August 1980	Tzaleket Ktana	צלקת קטנה	Makom Belibech	מקום בליבך	CBS	CDJ 1013^{a}	No. 15 • 20 Nov 1980 (גלי צה"ל)	promo 12" single a-side is original version of song, recorded at Kolinor	Non-album Singles
1981	Sheat Haze'evim	שעת הזאבים			CBS	DJ 303	No. 26 • 9 April 1981 (גלי צה"ל)	single-sided promo 12" original version, recorded at Triton in January 1981 with Uzi Binder	Non-album Singles
May 1981	Golem	גולם			CBS	DJ 321	N/A	single-sided promo 12"	Ima Ani Lo Rotze Lehigamel
1981	Rikud Ha'Incubator (The Incubator Dance)	רקוד האינקובטור	Sheat Haze'evim	שעת הזאבים	CBS	DJ 326	No. 11 • 17/18 Nov 1981 (רשת ג' – קול ישראל)	promo 12" single both sides recorded at Triton in July 1981	Ima Ani Lo Rotze Lehigamel
1982	Mondina	מונדינה	Et Mi At Ohevet	מי את אוהבת	CBS	DJ 425	No. 18 • 2 Dec 1982 (גלי צה"ל)	promo 12" single b-side is original version of track, recorded at Triton in June 1982	Olam Tzafuf
March 1983	Kol Haemet	כל האמת	Kol Haemet (Dub)	DUB כל האמת	CBS	DJ 460	No. 3 • 7-22 June 1983 (רשת ג' – קול ישראל)	promo 12" single	Olam Tzafuf
1983	Al Tadliku Li Ner	אל תדליקו לי נר			CBS	DJ 477	No. 5 • 23/24 Aug 1983 (רשת ג' – קול ישראל)	single-sided promo 12"	Olam Tzafuf

==== Notes ====
A.Though this single was pressed by CBS, it was not produced or released by them and thus they are not credited on the sleeve as record label like with subsequent HaClique 12" releases. It is currently unknown what the "C" prefix of CBS Israel's "CDJ" catalogue number designation means.

=== CD singles ===
Year	Title	Title in Hebrew	Record label	Cat No.	Notes	Album	Original Release
1998	Milim Zolot	מילים זולות	Singal'e	TEN CD 001	Three Versions	Non-album Single	
2002	Incubator	אינקובטור	NMC	cddj 1830	promo single	Hakufsa	Ima Ani Lo Rotze Leghigamel
2002	Al Tadliku Li Ner	אל תדליקו לי נר	NMC	cddj 1831	promo single	Hakufsa	Olam Tzafuf
2002	Eretz Israel 2000	ארץ ישראל 2000	NMC, LA4, Incubator	cddj 1832	promo single; unique single edit	Hakufsa	Hakol Mushlam
2011	28.3.2005		Kamea Records	5161055	EP; Limited edition of 600 copies		

=== Associated releases ===
Date	Artist	Title	Title in Hebrew	Record label	Cat No.	Format(s)	Notes
Early 1980	Dani Dothan + Eli Abramov		אחד עם ניסיון	N/A	N/A	12" Single	Private pressing. Recorded in late-1979 at Triton
November 1989	Jean Jacques Goldberg & Friends		מתופף אחד ושני מקלות	N/A	N/A	Radio	The Clique perform "Al Tadliku Li Ner" and "Golem"
March 1996	Dani Dothan	All Of The Forbidden Loves	כל האהבות אסורות	The Third Ear	OZEN 055	CD, MC	Solo album
????	Gosto Loby	Gosto Loby	גוסטו לובי	N/A	N/A	2×CD-r	Private pressing; with post-split material from 1984
