= Ness Digital Engineering =

Software services company

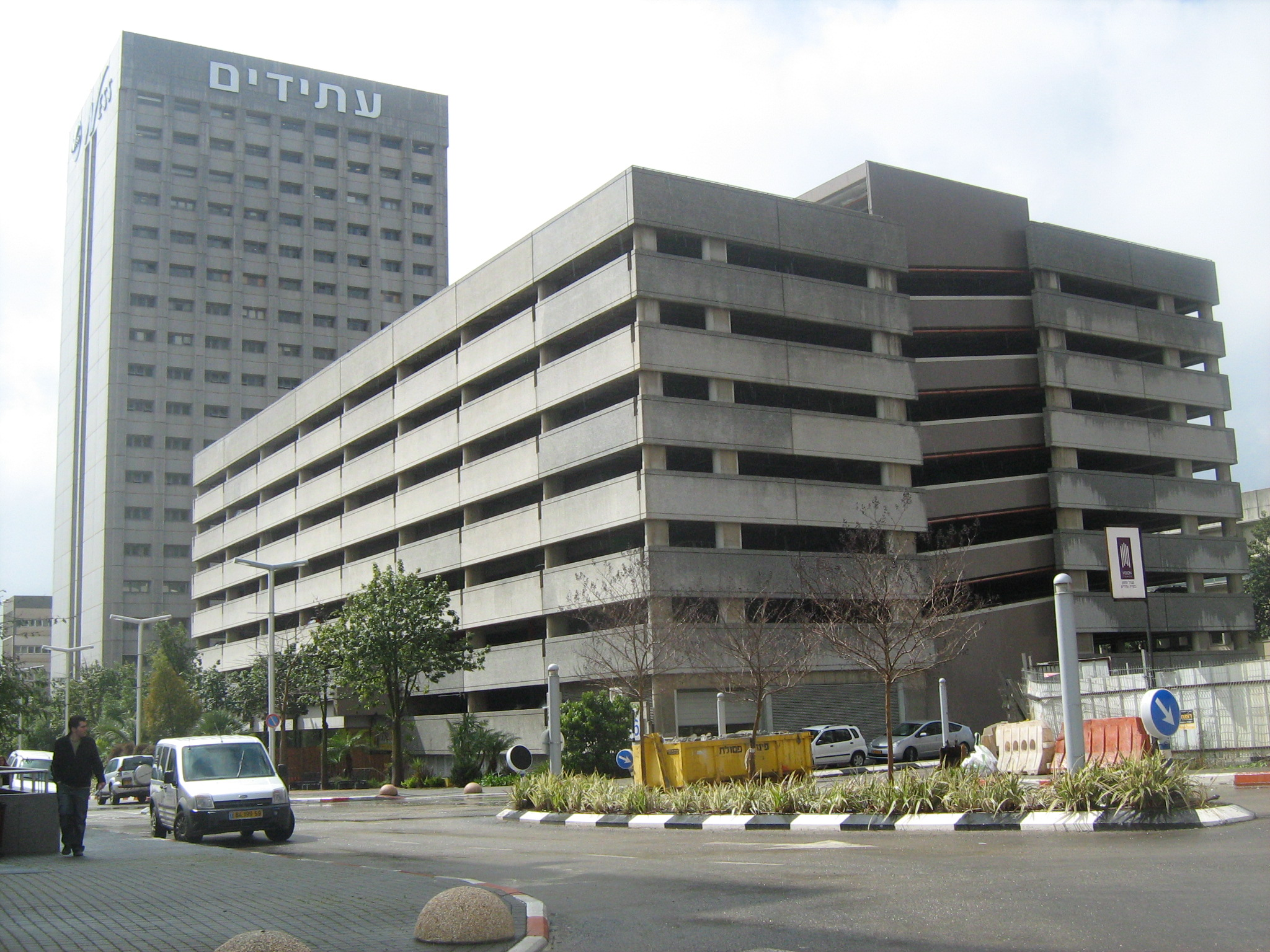
- Type: Private
- Industry: Software services
- Founded: 1999
- Headquarters: Teaneck, New Jersey, United States
- Services: Software development IT Consulting; IT Services; Outsourcing
- Number of employees: 3,500
- Parent: KKR
- Website: ness.com

Ness Digital Engineering is a digital engineering and technology services company headquartered at One World Trade Center in New York City. The business operates in 11 innovation hubs in the United States, Eastern Europe, Latin America and India, and is a portfolio company of KKR.

== History ==
Ness Digital Engineering was founded in 1999 as a custom software development and technology services company focused on enterprise engineering and distributed product development. During the 2000s, the company expanded its engineering operations across Eastern Europe and India to support global product development initiatives.

As of February 2026, the company is led by CEO Sudip Singh.

== Services and operations ==
Ness Digital Engineering’s business is organized into seven segments:

1. Cloud Services
2. Data & AI
3. Innovation & Design
4. Intelligent Engineering
5. Salesforce
6. Integration & Streaming
7. Global Capability Centers

Ness Digital Engineering provides services across banking and financial services, healthcare and life sciences, telecommunications, media and entertainment, manufacturing, retail and consumer services, private equity-backed enterprises, and the technology and software industries. The company promotes an Intelligent Engineering approach that combines software engineering, AI-enabled development, automation, and data-driven product delivery.

== Acquisitions ==
In June 2019, Ness Digital Engineering completed an acquisition of Sovereign CRM, a consultancy that specializes in the architecture, implementation, customization and integration of Salesforce products.

In January 2020, Ness Digital Engineering announced its acquisition of CassaCloud, a Kosice, Slovakia-based consultancy.

In May 2021, Ness Digital Engineering acquired Risk Focus, a consulting and advisory firm.

In June 2023, Ness Digital Engineering acquired MVP Factory, a Berlin-based corporate venture builder and product design studio.

In May 2024, Ness Digital Engineering acquired Intricity, a New York-based data strategy and monetization firm.

In December 2024, Ness Digital Engineering announced the acquisition of Raja Software Labs (RSL), a developer of mobile and web applications.

== See also ==
- Economy of Israel
- Science and technology in Israel
- Silicon Wadi
