= Tami Tamir =

Israeli computer scientist

Tamar (Tami) Tamir
- תמי תמיר
- Born: 1968 (age 57–58)
- Education: Technion – Israel Institute of Technology
- Known for: Approximation algorithms, algorithmic mechanism design
- Scientific career
- Fields: Computer Science
- Workplaces: Reichman University
- Doctoral advisor: Hadas Shachnai

Tamar (Tami) Tamir (Hebrew: תמר (תמי) תמיר; born 1968) is an Israeli computer scientist specializing in approximation algorithms and algorithmic mechanism design, especially for problems in resource allocation, scheduling, and packing problems. She is a professor in the Efi Arazi School of Computer Science of Reichman University.

== Education and career ==
Tamir was born in 1968 and graduated in 1992 from the Technion – Israel Institute of Technology with a bachelor's degree in computer science. She continued at the Technion for graduate study, earning a master's degree in 1995 and completing her Ph.D. in 2001. Her doctoral dissertation, Class-Constrained Resource Allocation Problems, was supervised by Hadas Shachnai.

While still a graduate student, Tamir worked at Intel, in the Israel Software Lab, from 1994 to 1997, and had a summer position at Hewlett-Packard. After postdoctoral research at the Technion and the University of Washington, Tamir joined the Efi Arazi School of Computer Science of Reichman University in 2004. She was vice-dean of the school from 2008 to 2012, and dean from 2012 to 2017.

== Selected publications ==
- Bar-Noy, Amotz; Bellare, Mihir; Halldórsson, Magnús M.; Shachnai, Hadas; Tamir, Tami (1998), "On chromatic sums and distributed resource allocation", Information and Computation, 140 (2): 183–202, doi:10.1006/inco.1997.2677, MR 1604200
- Karlin, Anna R.; Kempe, David; Tamir, Tami (2005), "Beyond VCG: frugality of truthful mechanisms", 46th Annual IEEE Symposium on Foundations of Computer Science (FOCS 2005), 23–25 October 2005, Pittsburgh, PA, USA, Proceedings, IEEE Computer Society, pp. 615–626, doi:10.1109/SFCS.2005.25, ISBN 0-7695-2468-0, S2CID 9065000
- Kulik, Ariel; Shachnai, Hadas; Tamir, Tami (2009), "Maximizing submodular set functions subject to multiple linear constraints", in Mathieu, Claire (ed.), Proceedings of the Twentieth Annual ACM–SIAM Symposium on Discrete Algorithms, SODA 2009, New York, NY, USA, January 4–6, 2009, Society for Industrial and Applied Mathematics, pp. 545–554
- Shachnai, Hadas; Tamir, Tami (2018), "Polynomial time approximation schemes", in Gonzalez, Teofilo F. (ed.), Handbook of Approximation Algorithms and Metaheuristics, Volume 1: Methologies and Traditional Applications (2nd ed.), Chapman and Hall/CRC, pp. 125–156, doi:10.1201/9781351236423-8, ISBN 978-1-351-23642-3
