= Daniel Efrat =

Israeli actor, director, and translator

- דניאל אפרת
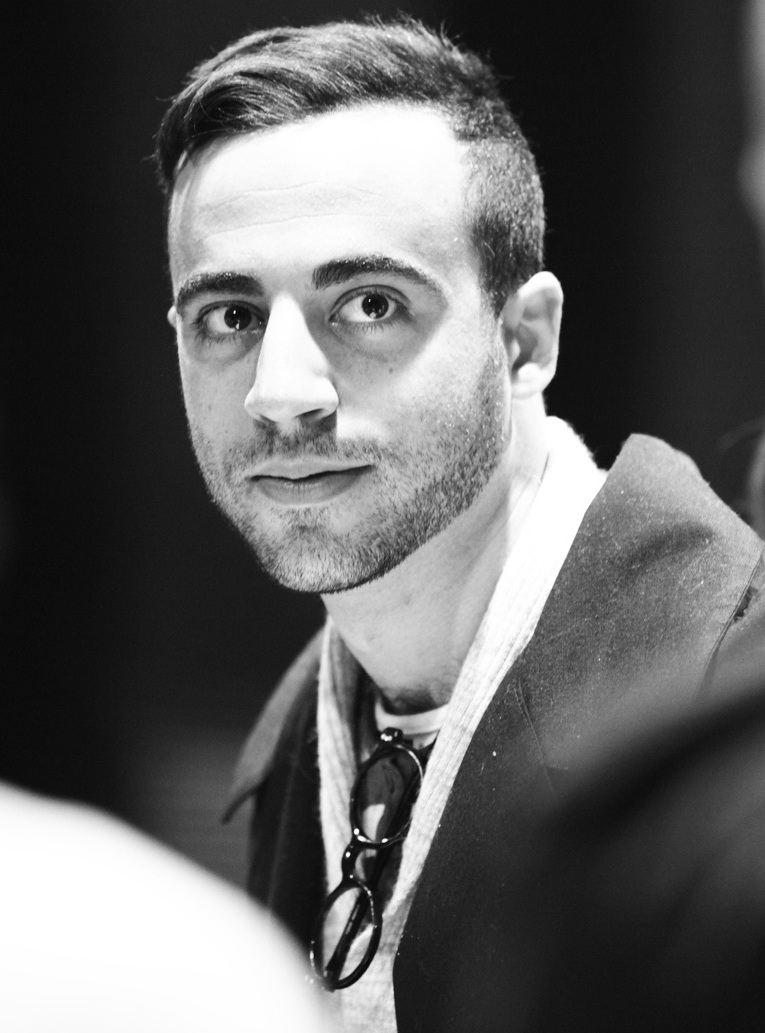
- Efrat in 2012
- Born: 4 August 1982 (age 43); Tel Aviv, Israel
- Education: Beit Zvi School for the Performing Arts (MA)
- Occupations: Theatre director; translator; actor
- Parents: Ovad Efrat (father); Daphna Efrat (mother)

Daniel Efrat (Hebrew: דניאל אפרת; born 4 August 1982) is an Israeli actor, theatre director, and translator. He trained at Beit Zvi, where he first began translating (English into Hebrew), before joining the Beit Lessin Theater youth company. He has also acted in film and television. He has won various awards in Israel for his translation and direction, as well as acting awards.

== Early life and education ==
Daniel Efrat was born in Tel Aviv, Israel, on 4 August 1982, to musician Ovad Efrat and scholar Daphna Efrat née Tamir. As a child, his father's musician friends would stay at their house, but Efrat said that he was not very excited to see them and that he preferred getting to explore recording studios. He grew up with a relatively liberal family, though he first read Spring Awakening at home when he was fourteen and identified with its themes of stifled adolescence. He has reflected that "there was no real musical theater in Israel when [he] was growing up", so instead he dreamed about it.

Efrat left home when he was seventeen because he was scared of coming out to his parents, saying he left because he "was angry at them for the reaction [he] expected"; he told them he was gay shortly after he left and they were understanding: "in the first conversation with my mother ... this issue came up, I told her, and she told dad, and the next morning I got a call from him [during which] he told me how much he loved me."

Around the same time he was sent a conscription order for the Israel Defense Forces (IDF), but was not signed up, saying: "I did not ask to be released. I was released. I got there, they saw what was sitting in front of them and decided". He suggested in an interview with Makor Rishon that it was related to his sexuality. He had also not wanted to enlist personally, and his parents reacted badly to this; his father had been in the elite Shayetet 13.

He attended the Tel Aviv School of Arts, Thelma Yellin School of Arts and Beit Zvi School for the Performing Arts, where he earned an MA and received awards for outstanding first-year student and outstanding graduating student. He also received the outstanding graduate award from Thelma Yellin. Efrat graduated from Beit Zvi in 2003. He began translating while at Beit Zvi, saying that he really wanted to perform The Rocky Horror Show for his senior project in 2002, but no Hebrew translation existed for it, so he did it himself. When instructors heard he had translated a musical, they encouraged him to do some more. His father's band, HaClique, had debuted following a 1980 screening of The Rocky Horror Picture Show at the Cinema Paris in Tel Aviv.

== Career ==
=== Acting ===
Efrat first acted as a child, in the 1991 American television movie Iran: Days of Crisis directed by Kevin Connor, credited as Daniel Ephrat. On television he appeared in Hamachon. His first major film role was in Nadav Levitan's 1998 Aviv (Real Father). He went on to act in several other Levitan films. He then played lead role Menni in the Yair Hochner film Yeladim Tovim (Good Boys), a film about rent boys. He won the Best Actor award at the 2006 Tampa International Gay and Lesbian Film Festival for the film.

In 2008, the youth theatre group at the Beit Lessin Theater was formed, and Efrat joined. This year he performed in and wrote Broadway Corner Freshman, a comedy revue musical featuring songs and condensed plots of popular Israeli musicals. It was praised as a "loving and nostalgic tribute". At Beit Lessin, he performed in a variety of musicals, including Hair as Woof, Joseph and the Amazing Technicolor Dreamcoat as Joseph and Benjamin, Blood Brothers as Eddie and Sammy, and Cabaret as the Emcee.

=== Musical translations ===
He stayed in the theatre and began translating, adapting, and directing. Efrat has said that though he acts, he prefers being known for his work behind the scenes, even though translating is "not a sexy craft", and that he is addicted to both performing and creative work. With Eli Bijawi and Roy Chen, he makes up the young generation of Israeli translation playwriting.

In 2010, as part of Beit Lessin's youth theatre group, he won the Rabinowitz Charitable Foundation's Ada Ben Nachum Award for his translation of Spring Awakening, starring Ninet Tayeb, which he also performed in and produced. The citation, which also mentioned his 2009 translation of A Midsummer Night's Dream, said that he "successfully faced the special challenges posed by the original text: a dialogue that is a mixture of period language, stylistic poetic language and contemporary dialect". Though the play version of Spring Awakening had been performed before in Israel, Efrat's was the first production of the musical. In 2013, Efrat translated The Rocky Horror Show for its commercial Israeli debut, featuring Lake Rodberg and third-year students of the Yoram Lowenstein acting studio, in Tel Aviv.

Efrat translated Animal Farm for its premiere as a musical adaptation in 2015. In 2017, he translated Hairspray into Hebrew for its Israeli debut. A review in BroadwayWorld said that "the songs were still extremely fun and flowing and Efrat can clearly write beautiful songs, but one of the major things that made Hairspray such a great musical is Scott Wittman and Marc Shaiman's lyrics and without them it's like a production of Hairspray without tall hair wigs." For the Israeli debut of School of Rock in 2019, Efrat translated Andrew Lloyd Webber's songs, saying that though he'd never met Lloyd Webber, he reached out to get approval for each of the song translations and compositions and was never turned down.

His translation of Dear Evan Hansen debuted at the Cameri Theatre in January 2025. The Jerusalem Post praised the cultural adaptations and matching the composition and intention of the original production's songs, though felt some of the lyrical choices were simplistic and basic.

=== Directing ===
He directed the 2012–2013 revival of Hillel Mittelpunkt's Mami; critical of occupation of Gaza and the West Bank, and of the IDF, the theatre invited soldiers to watch the show for free. Hava Yarom for Martha Yodaat theatre review magazine wrote that Efrat "is an extraordinary artist, who certainly knows how to swing his baton on plays and especially on musicals ... and has certainly left his mark on the field of translation" but felt that his attempts to make the musical his own added too much decoration, with "multicoloured vocal richness"; new characters; and more elaborate costumes, choreography, and set designs, distracting from the material. Yarom particularly felt that the staging of the rape scene took away from the Mami performance, though considered that the adaptation as a whole was the negative, saying Efrat's boldness should be praised. Ovad Efrat, his father, was the musical director and arranger.

In 2015, his direction of Billy Schwartz at the Haifa Theatre won the four major awards of the Israeli Theater Academy Awards. It was then staged in North America. Efrat had first directed the original musical in 2013; musician Ohad Hitman approached director Efrat and artistic director Uri Paster with his Jerusalem Academy of Music and Dance dissertation music, hoping to create a musical. They took the result to the Bat Yam Musical Festival, where it won the grand prize, including a development grant, before working on it more for the commercial debut at Haifa.

=== Songs ===
Other translations include songs in films and movie musicals, including Tangled, Rio and the Ice Age films.

He has also written pop songs, including "Dai La" with Marta Gómez for Roni Dalumi's 2010 debut album.
