= Volcani =

Volcani may refer to:

- Yitzhak Elazari Volcani, Israeli biologist
- Benjamin Elazari Volcani, Israeli biologist
- Volcani Institute, or Agricultural Research Organization, Volcani Center
- Area Volcani in the Vulcanal precinct
