= Beit Elazari =

Moshav in central Israel

Beit El'azari: בֵּית אֶלְעָזָרִי (Hebrew)
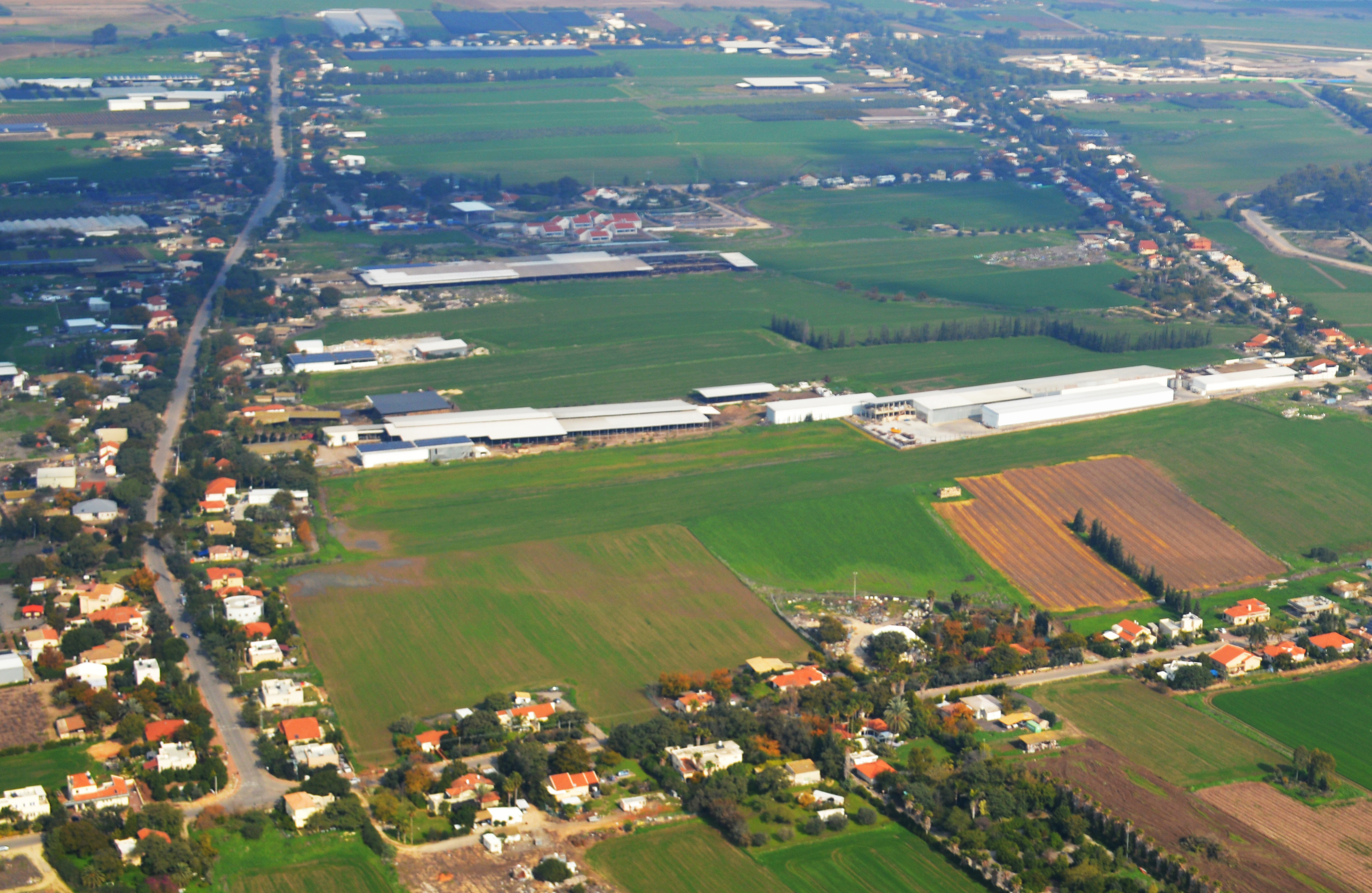
- Etymology: House of El'azari
- Location within Central Israel Location within Israel
- Coordinates: 31°50′37″N 34°48′15″E
- Country: Israel
- District: Central
- Subdistrict: Rehovot
- Council: Brenner
- Affiliation: Moshavim Movement
- Founded: 1948
- Founder: Eastern European immigrants
- Population (2024): 1,629
- Website: www.beitelazari.co.il

Beit El'azari (Hebrew: בֵּית אֶלְעָזָרִי, lit. House of El'azari; Arabic: بيت إلعزاري) is a moshav in central Israel. Located three miles south of the city of Rehovot, it falls under the jurisdiction of Brenner Regional Council. In 2024 it had a population of 1,629.

== History ==
It was founded in 1948 by Jewish immigrants from eastern Europe, on the site of the depopulated Palestinian village of al-Maghar. Initially named Arugot (Hebrew: ערוגות), it was later renamed Ekron HaHadasha (Hebrew: עקרון החדשה, lit. New Ekron), and finally Beit El'azari in memory of the agronomist Yitzhak Elazari Volcani, founder of modern agriculture in Israel.

== Notable people ==
Avraham Zilberberg, MK

== See also ==
- Agricultural research in Israel
- Benjamin Elazari Volcani
