= Zdenka Samish =

Czech-Israeli food technology researcher

- זדנקה סמיש
- Born: March 13, 1904; Prague
- Died: March 8, 2008 (aged 103); Rehovot, Israel
- Resting place: Rehovot Old Cemetery
- Education: B.S., UC Davis, 1931; M.A., household sciences, UC Berkeley, 1933
- Spouse(s): Moshe Rudolf Samish, PhD
- Children: 2
- Scientific career
- Fields: Food technology
- Institutions: Agricultural Research Station (Volcani Center)
- Thesis: The Effect of Excess Viosterol and of Parathyroid Extract upon the Tissues of Rats (1933)

Zdenka Samish (Hebrew: זדנקה סמיש, also spelled Samisch) (March 13, 1904 – March 8, 2008) was a Czech-Israeli food technology researcher. One of the first agricultural researchers in Mandatory Palestine and then Israel, she studied methods for industrial processing of fruits and vegetables, canning, and food infestation. Her research was published in numerous peer-reviewed journals. She was director of the Department of Food Technology at the Agricultural Research Station (Volcani Center) in Rehovot from the early 1950s to 1969.

== Early life and education ==
Zdenka (Devorah) Kohn was born in Prague to Otto and Vilma Kohn. Active in the Zionist youth movement, she immigrated to Palestine in 1924. In 1926 she and her husband, Moshe Rudolf Samish, also a Czech native, went to California to complete their degrees at UC Davis and UC Berkeley. (Note: In 1927 she was listed as a first-year degree student, and her husband as a fourth-year degree student, in the College of Agriculture at UC Davis.) She received her B.S. in 1931 at UC Davis and her M.A. in household science in 1933 at UC Berkeley; her masters thesis was on "The Effect of Excess Viosterol and of Parathyroid Extract upon the Tissues of Rats".

== Career ==
In 1934 the couple returned to Palestine and she began working as a chemist at a fruit canning factory in Rehovot. In 1937 she joined the experimental research station in that city, and in 1946 was named director of the laboratory for canned fruits and vegetables. In 1949 she became an instructor at the Hebrew University of Jerusalem's Faculty of Agriculture in Rehovot on the subject of food technology. After 1951 she became director of food technology at the Agricultural Research Station in Rehovot.

== Research ==
It's possible to make jam from every fruit and vegetable. The only question is how much sugar is needed.

–Zdenka Samish

In 1946 Samish received a grant from the Mandatory government to develop methods for producing juices and concentrates from citrus fruits. In 1947 she received a U.S. patent for the manufacture of dried citrus fruit paste (fruit leather).

Other research projects included a joint U.S.-Israeli study of microorganisms found in fruit and vegetable pulp; techniques for squeezing olives and producing olive oil; tomato paste production; industrial processing of potatoes and peaches; and freezing and dehydrating vegetables. Her research on "bloaters" – cucumbers that float to the surface instead of staying in the brine during the pickling process – was reported in the U.S. publications Science News and Organic Gardening and Farming.

Samish served as a consultant on planning committees for food production and helped draw up standards for food products in institutions in Israel and abroad. She also introduced the subject of canning to agricultural schools in Israel.

Although she retired in 1969, she continued her research at the Volcani Center for several more years. She was appointed as an official representative of the Ministry of Agriculture's Fruit Council in 1979.

== Awards and honors ==
In 1992 she was honored as a Worthy Agricultural Researcher (Hebrew: יקיר המחקר החקלאי) for being one of the first agricultural researchers in Mandatory Palestine. In 1996 she was honored as a Worthy Citizen of the City of Rehovot.

== Personal life ==
She and her husband, Moshe Rudolf Samish, PhD (1904–1975), had two sons. He worked in the experimental research station in Rehovot in the area of plantations, as director of the Division of Pomology and Viticulture at the Agricultural Research Station (Volcani Center), and as a professor in the Hebrew University of Jerusalem's Faculty of Agriculture in Rehovot.

Zdenka Samish died on March 8, 2008, less than a week shy of her 104th birthday, and was buried beside her husband in the Rehovot Old Cemetery.

== Selected bibliography ==
- Shomer, I.; Flavian, Solange; Samish, Zdenka; Ben-Gera, I. (June 1973). "Concentration of solutions by vertical-gradient freezing". International Journal of Food Science & Technology. 8 (2): 157–162. doi:10.1111/j.1365-2621.1973.tb01701.x.
- Ludin, A.; Samish, Zdenka; Levi, A.; Hershkowitz, Ester (June 1969). "Studies on the quality characteristics of canned grapefruit segments". International Journal of Food Science & Technology. 4 (2): 171–177. doi:10.1111/j.1365-2621.1969.tb01511.x.
- Juven, B.; Samish, Zdenka; Henis, Y.; Jacoby, B. (June 1968). "Mechanism of Enhancement of Lactic Acid Fermentation of Green Olives by Alkali and Heat Treatments". Journal of Applied Bacteriology. 31 (2): 200–207. doi:10.1111/j.1365-2672.1968.tb00358.x.
- Coussin, B. R.; Samish, Zdenka (March 1968). "The free amino acids of Israeli orange juice". Journal of Food Science. 33 (2): 196–199. doi:10.1111/j.1365-2621.1968.tb01349.x.
- Samish, Zdenka; Conssin, B. R. (1965). "The production of dehydrated flakes as a means of utilizing surplus bananas". Israel Journal of Agricultural Research. 15 (1): 49–51.
- Samish, Zdenka; Etinger-Tulczynska, R.; Bick, Miriam (May 1963). "The Microflora Within the Tissue of Fruits and Vegetables". Journal of Food Science. 28 (3): 259–266. doi:10.1111/j.1365-2621.1963.tb00194.x.
- Samish, Zdenka; Etinger-Tulczynska, R. (28 June 1962). "Distribution of Bacteria Within the Tissue of Healthy Tomatoes" (PDF). Applied Microbiology. 11 (1): 7–10. doi:10.1128/am.11.1.7-10.1963. PMC 1057926. PMID 13991315.
- Samish, Zdenka; Etinger-Tulczynska, R.; Bick, Miriam (1961). "Microflora Within Healthy Tomatoes". Applied Microbiology. 9 (1): 20–25. doi:10.1128/AEM.9.1.20-25.1961. PMC 1057663. PMID 13745913.
- Samish, Z.; Dimant, D. (1959). "Bacterial population in fresh, healthy cucumbers". Food Manufacturing. 34: 17–20.
- Samish, Z.; Dimant, D.; Marani, T. (1957). "Hollowness in cucumber pickles". Food Manufacturing. 32: 501–505.
- Samish, Zdenka; Cohen, Aryeh (1949). הרכב תפוח-הזהב בישראל [The Golden Apple Car in Israel]. Jewish Agency for Israel.
- Morgan, Agnes Fay; Samisch, Zdenka (1934). "The Sequence and Extent of Tissue Changes Produced by Viosterol and Parathyroid Extract". Proceedings of the American Society of Biological Chemists: lxiv.
