= Agricultural research in Israel =

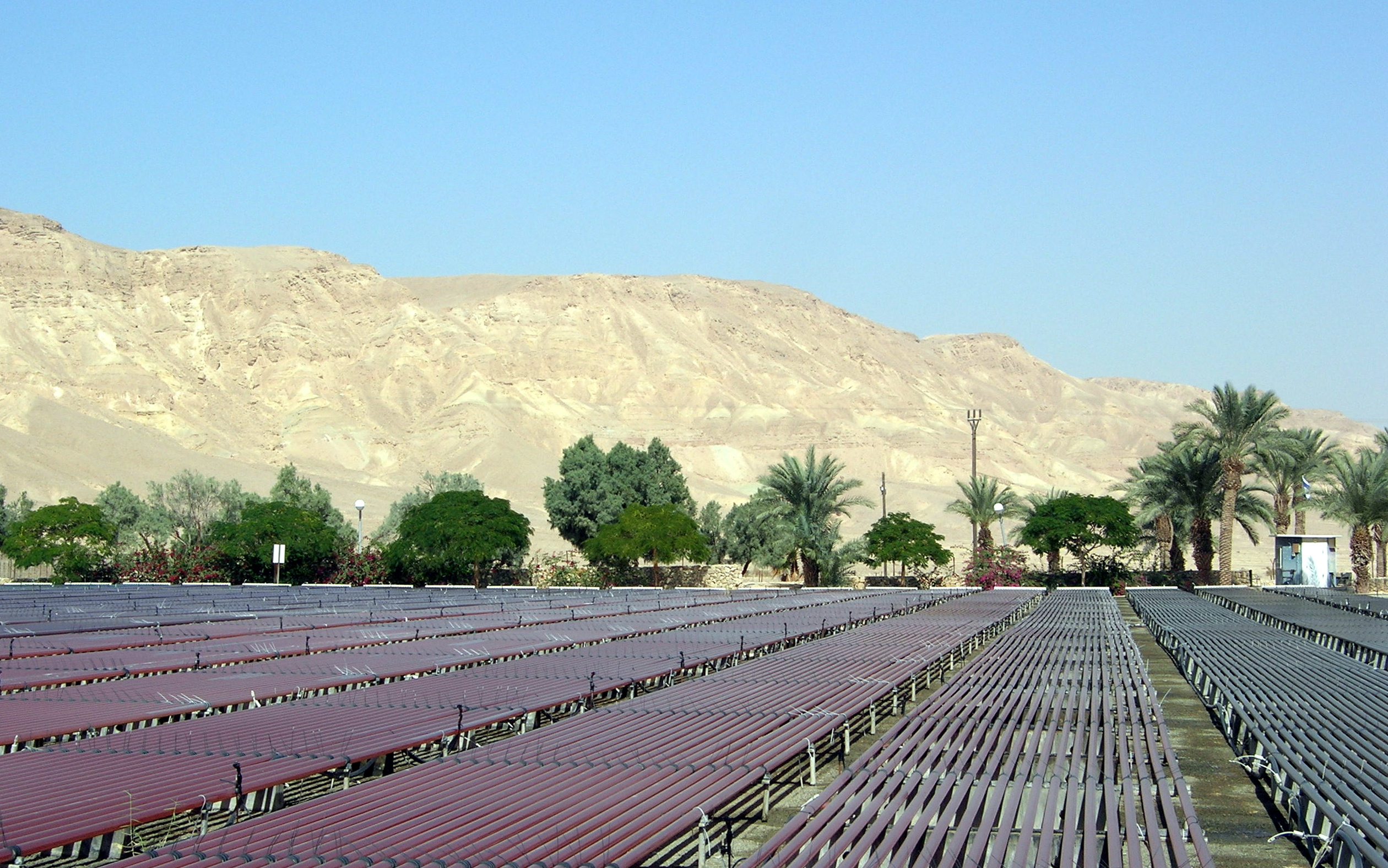
Advanced agricultural technology at Kibbutz Ketura

Agricultural research in Israel is based on close cooperation and interaction between scientists, consultants, farmers and agriculture-related industries. Israel's climate ranges from Mediterranean (Csa) to semi-arid and arid. Shortage of irrigation water and inadequate precipitation in some parts of the country are major constraints facing Israeli agriculture. Through extensive greenhouses production, vegetables, fruits and flowers are grown for export to the European markets during the winter off-season.

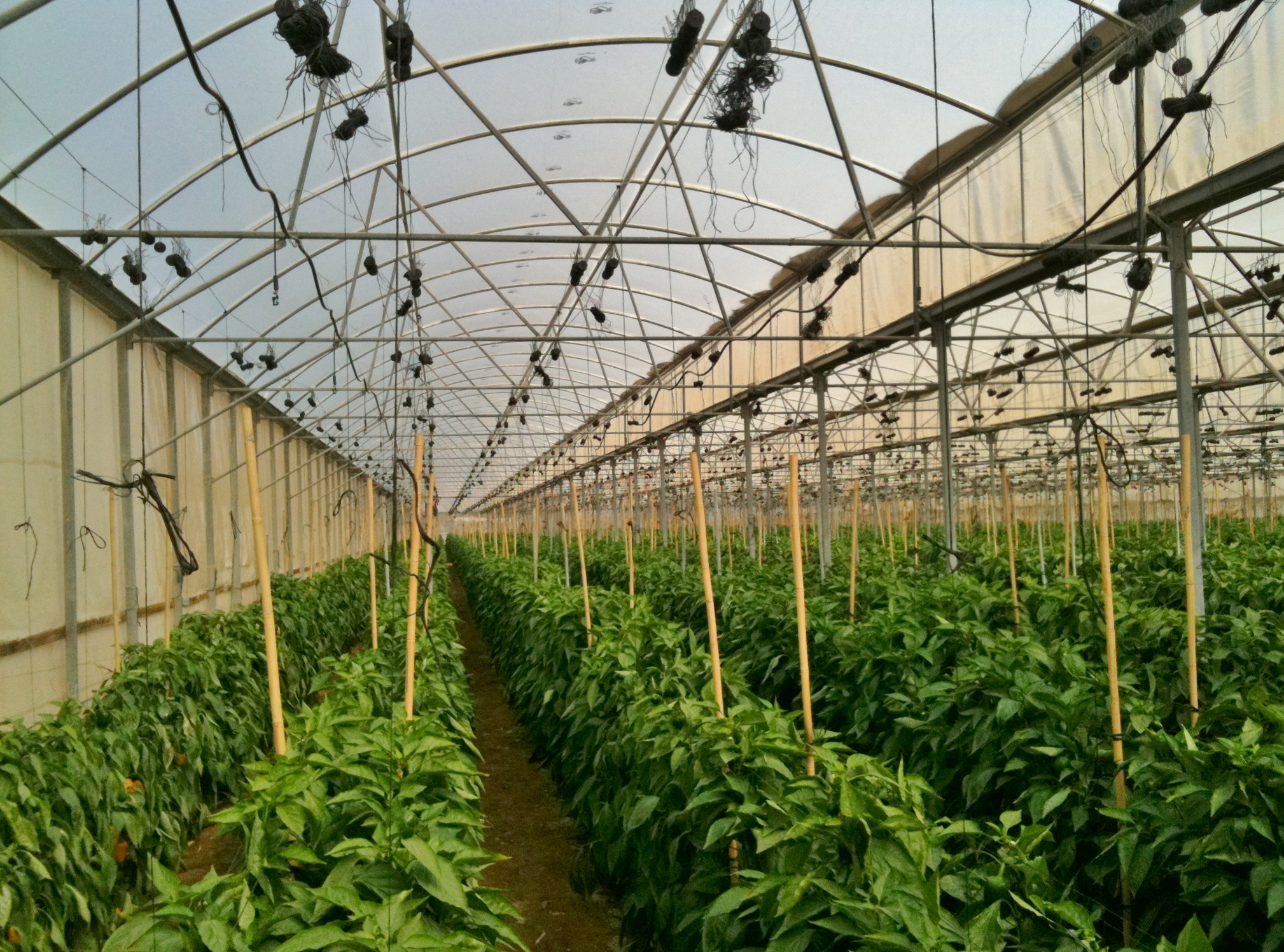
Greenhouse cultivation in Israel

The Agricultural Experiment Station established in 1921 developed into the Agricultural Research Organization (ARO), widely known as the Volcani Institute. The Faculty of Agriculture of the Hebrew University of Jerusalem, Tel Aviv University, Bar Ilan University, Ben Gurion University of the Negev and the Weizmann Institute of Science also engage in agricultural research.

== History ==
Farming has been practiced in the region which became Israel for 10,000 years. In the late 19th century Jewish and Palestinian Arab farmers expanded the acreage devoted to commercial and export crops. The forerunners of agricultural research in Palestine were the teachers and instructors of the Mikveh Israel agricultural school, established in 1870. The pioneers of many of the early farming settlements cultivated experimental plots supervised by an agronomist. Arriving in the country with little or no previous agricultural experience, this kind of experimentation was vital for the development of such crops as grapes, citrus and almonds. Arab agriculture revolved primarily around dry farming, with wheat, barley, chickpeas, sesame and olives predominating. The few German Templer villages were based on relatively large farms of dry farming of wheat and barley.

In 1906, Jewish agronomist Aaron Aaronsohn discovered wild emmer (Triticum dicoccoides), believed to be the "mother of wheat".

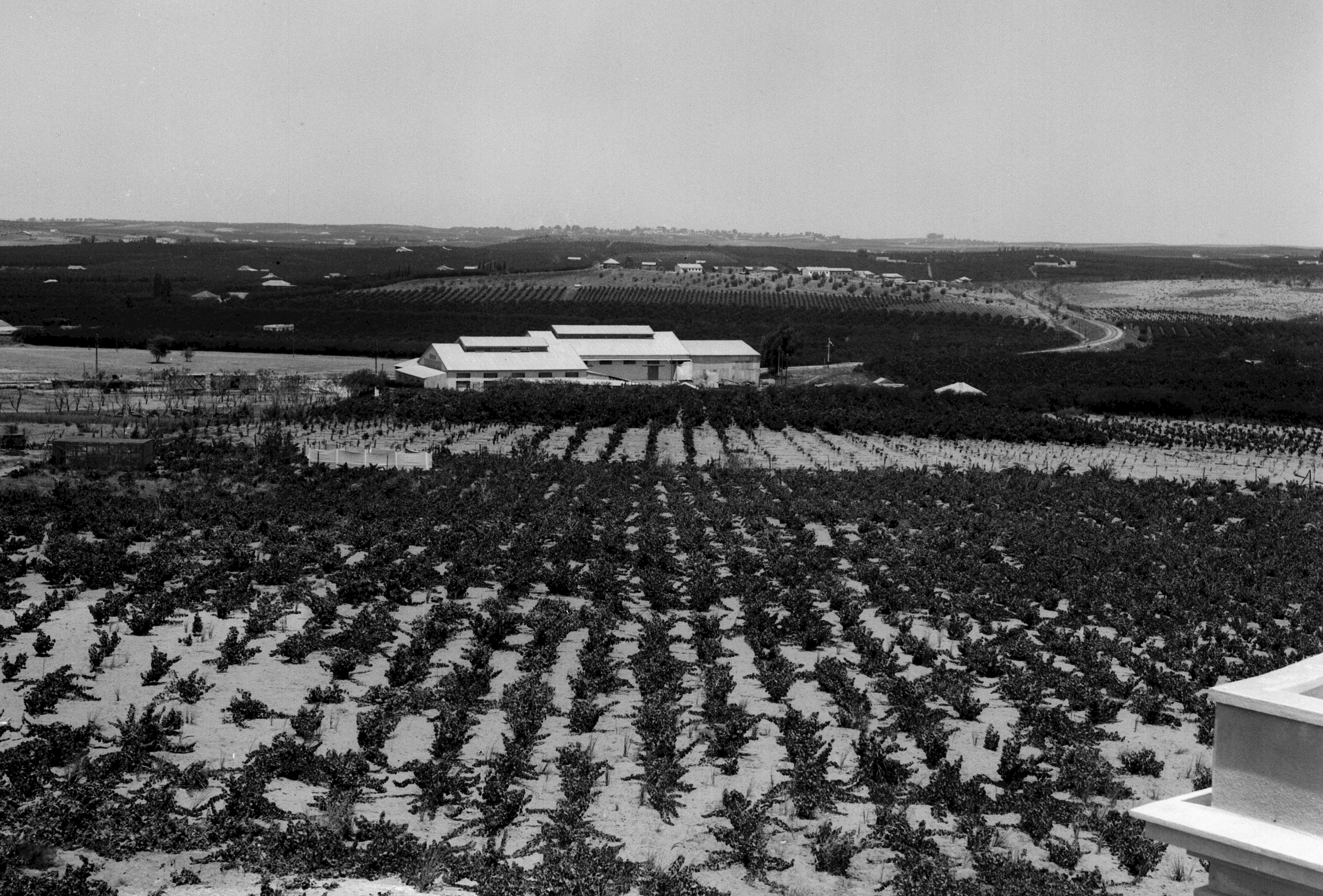
General view of the Agricultural Research Institute in Rehovot, 1933

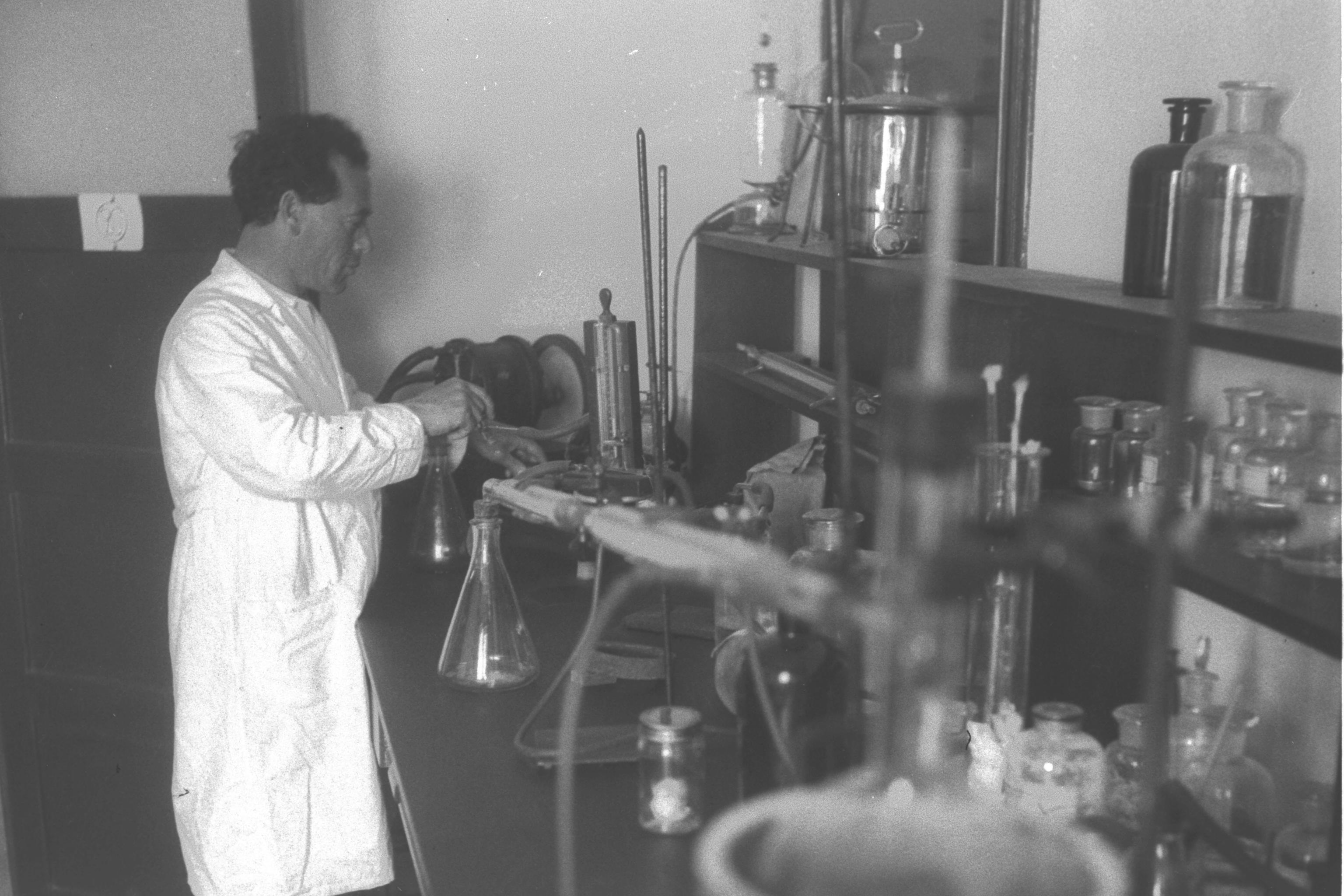
A chemist working in the laboratory of the Agricultural Research Station in Rehovot

After the Balfour declaration by Great Britain in 1917 and the award of the mandate to Palestine by the League of Nations to Britain, the Jewish Agency established in 1921 the Agricultural Experiment Station. Their mission was to conduct research leading to small farms with intensive agriculture, specializing in mixed farming of fruit trees, cattle, chicken, vegetables and cereals. The research station, headed by Yitzhak Elazari Volcani and located in Rehovot, was the first scientific institute in Palestine. It had departments for crop sciences, fruit and citrus, soil and irrigation, entomology and plant pathology, post-harvest, food technology and farm economics. The station had an extension department and results of its research were quickly passed on to the farmers. Yields of grain under dryland conditions increased from 600 to 5000 kg per hectare; and breeding and selection of cattle increased milk production from 800–1500 kg to 5000 kg/cow/year (1950) {now more than 11.000 kg/cow/year- 2005}. Research in storage of citrus fruit reduced spoilage during shipping to Europe due to fungal rots from 30% to 2-3%.

In 1942 the Hebrew University in Jerusalem decided to establish the Institute for Agricultural Studies, which later developed into the Faculty of Agricultural, Food and Environmental Quality Sciences. In the beginning the faculty staff came mainly from the Agricultural Experiment Station and students worked on their theses in the laboratories of the Station. Michael Evenari (1904-1989, born as Walter Schwarz) was among the early pioneers. The British government also established a small agricultural research department with several stations in both Arab and Jewish areas. After 1948, with the establishment of the State of Israel, the two research stations were merged into the Agricultural Research Station within the Ministry of Agriculture. However, the extension and advisory service, previously part of the research station, now became an independent branch within the Ministry.

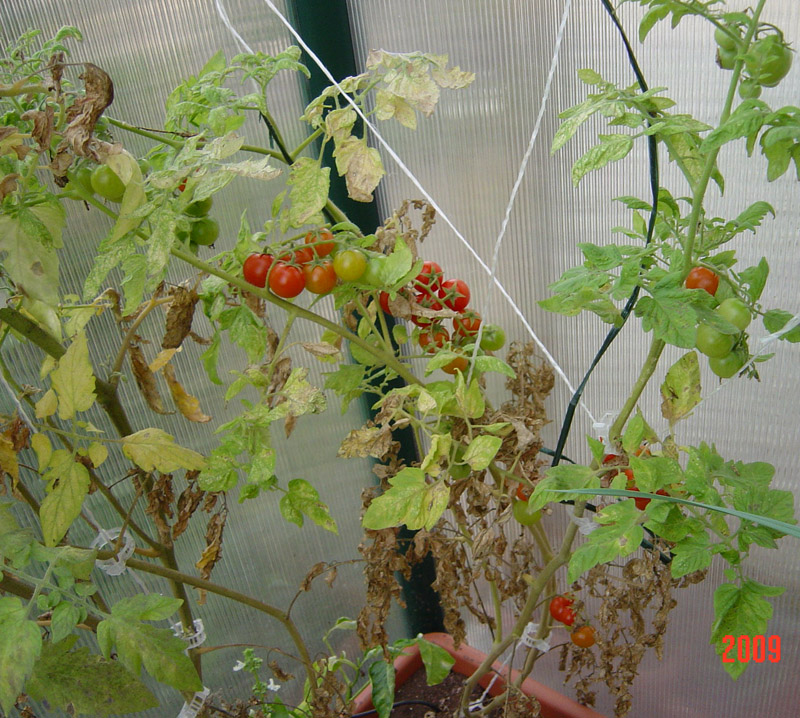
Tomatoes grown in a greenhouse in Israel

The modern brand cherry tomato was developed by Israeli scientists in the 1970s.

In 1960 an attempt was made to merge the Agricultural Research Station with the Faculty of Agriculture of the Hebrew University, to form the "National and University Institute of Agriculture." The idea was based on the US model of the Land Grant Colleges). This attempt failed, mainly because the basic working conditions were not equalized before the merger. Nevertheless, a close cooperation exists between the two institutions. The senior researchers of the Agricultural Research Station serve on the teaching staff of the Faculty and students from the Faculty do their research for M.Sc. and Ph.D. theses at the Research Station.

With the growth of the various disciplines in the Agricultural Research Station and the establishment of regional research stations, the organizational structure has changed over time. The Agricultural Research Organization (ARO) was established in 1971, incorporating all agricultural research within the Ministry of Agriculture.

=== Agricultural Research Organization (ARO) ===
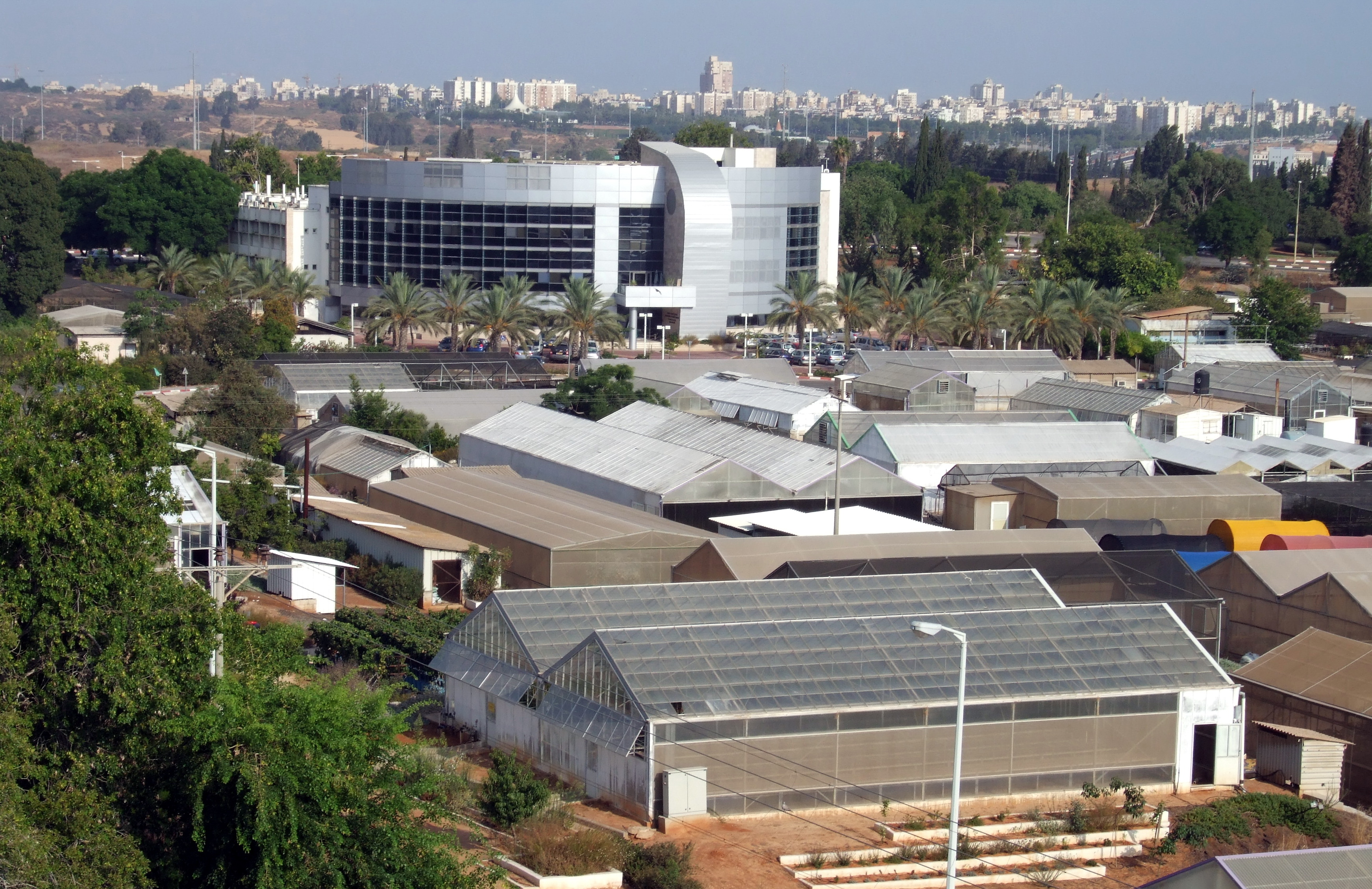
Aerial view of the Volcani Institute of Agricultural Research

The job of the ARO is to help the development of the Israeli agriculture by an efficient use of the limited water resources, development of crops for export markets, ensuring a decent income for the farming community, developing and adapting crops and technologies for newly settled regions without polluting the environment. Within the ARO are six institutes, two commodity (Plant and Animal Sciences) and four discipline oriented institutes (Plant Protection, Soil, Water and Environmental Sciences, Technology & Storage of Agricultural Products and Agricultural Engineering). The ARO has two additional research centers – Gilat, in southern Israel and Neve Ya'ar in the north.

Within the six institutes the various scientific departments cover all agricultural disciplines except veterinary sciences. In addition to the Institutes the ARO maintains a computer unit, Genomics and Bio-informatics section, technology transfer (engaged in business related activities), international activities, youth activity units and a library.

The Veterinary Institute of the Veterinary Services of the Ministry of Agriculture is also located on the central campus of the ARO.

== Public-funded research ==
The present main objectives of the public funded research are: Supply of fresh food products all the year around at reasonable prices; increasing exports of agricultural products; strengthening the farming community at the periphery of the country; increasing production and income of farmers; efficient use of the limited water resources and precision agriculture. These goals require development of new products and cultivars, improvement of food quality and safety, functional food, integrated pest management (IPM), precision agriculture and farming efficiency, with agricultural technologies friendly to the environment.

The fund of the Chief Scientist is open to scientists from all institutions – ARO, universities, regional research organizations, extension specialists and farmers.

In addition to the Chief Scientist's fund the various commodity branches, as vegetables, flowers, fruits, dairy cattle etc. also allocate research funding of direct interest to them. The Minister of Agriculture, upon recommendation of the Chief Scientist, appoints the committee members for research in each commodity branch. In general a third of the members come from the scientific community, a third from the extension service and a third are farmers. The proposals submitted to the commodity branches also undergo the scientific evaluation process.

A substantial source of funding, mainly for more basic research, comes from bi-national funds. The leading one is The United States - Israel Binational Agricultural Research and Development Fund (BARD). BARD is a competitive funding program for mutually beneficial, mission-oriented, strategic and applied research of agricultural problems, jointly conducted by American and Israeli scientists. Since 1979, BARD has funded over 870 research projects, with awards of about $9.5 million annually for new research projects. Most of these are of three years duration, the average award being $300,00. Budgets are distributed about equally between the two countries. Proposals are evaluated both in the US by the Agricultural Research Service (ARS) and in Israel by the Scientific Evaluation Committees (SEC), based on expert reviewers from different countries. The recommendations from ARS and SEC are brought before a Technical Advisory Committee (TAC) for final recommendations to the Board of BARD. Among the research areas funded were: Alleviating Heat Stress in Dairy Cattle, Breeding for Heat Tolerant Wheat Varieties, Improving Wheat-Seed Proteins by Molecular Approaches, Algal Culture and Improving Cut Flower Quality to name only a few where significant results were obtained (BARD, 20 year external review). The success of BARD led to the establishment of additional bi-national funds as the Joint Dutch-Israeli Agricultural Science and Technology Program, a bi-national Program with Queensland (Australia) and Canada. The latter are all on a much lower funding level than BARD. In addition funding is also obtained from the EU, The US – Israel Bi-national Science Foundation (BSF) and others.

The Faculty of Agriculture, Food and Environmental Quality Sciences of the Hebrew University in Rehovot is a major partner in the conduct of agricultural research. In the Faculty, which includes Agricultural economics and management, a School of nutritional sciences and hotel, food and tourism management are about 90 tenured scientific staff. The major scientific disciplines are: Agricultural Botany; Field Crops, Vegetables and Genetics; and Horticulture; Biochemistry, Food Science and Nutrition; Entomology and Plant pathology; Soil and water sciences; Animal sciences; Veterinary medicine and Agricultural economics and management. Additional research is carried out at Bar-Ilan University, Tel Aviv University, the Weizmann Institute of Science, and Ben-Gurion University of the Negev, whose Jacob Blaustein Institute specializes in arid-zone agriculture.

== Achievements ==
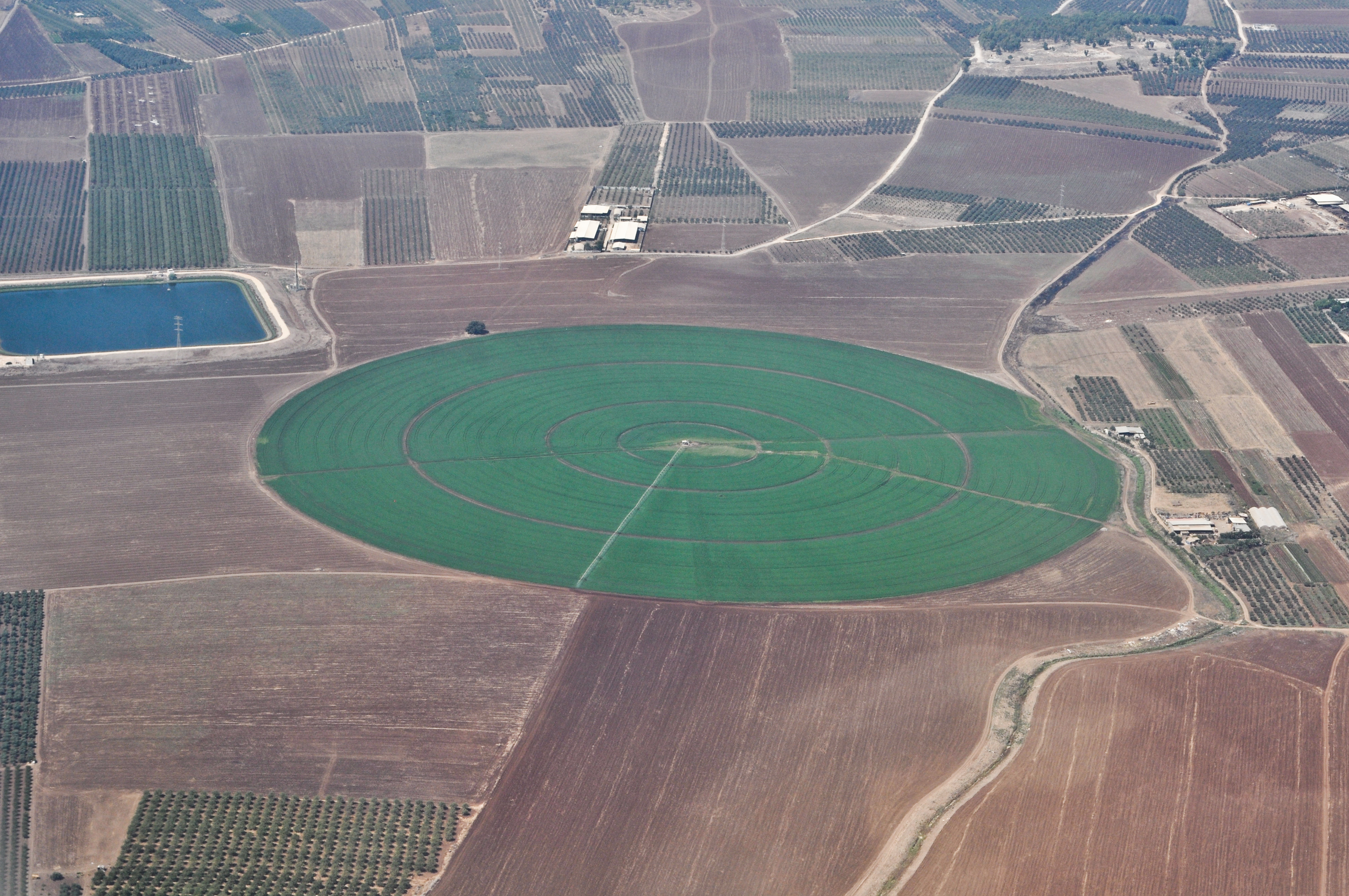
Irrigated agricultural fields in Israel

The ARO and its forerunner, the Agricultural Research Station, have helped to turn Israel's “mixed farming” system into a highly industrialized enterprise focused on export to Europe. Serious water shortages have led to the use of low quality and recycled water. Some 44% of the water used for agriculture comes from recycled water without lowering quality of the produce.

Exports to Europe include fruits (citrus, avocado, grapes), vegetables (sweet peppers, tomatoes, potato, melons, sweet potato), ornamentals (cut flowers, potted plants, propagation material) and herbs. In 1997, agricultural export (fresh and processed) reached over $1.329 billion - approximately 6.4% of the country's total exports (Source: Central Bureau of Statistics). This has necessitated an ongoing search for new products, niches in seasons and better storage technologies. Major achievements included an increase in productivity of fruit, vegetable and field crops with a reduced input of chemical fertilizers and pesticides. Efficiency in dairy farming has increased milk production to one of the highest in the world: over 10,200 litre/cow/year.

== Awards and recognition ==
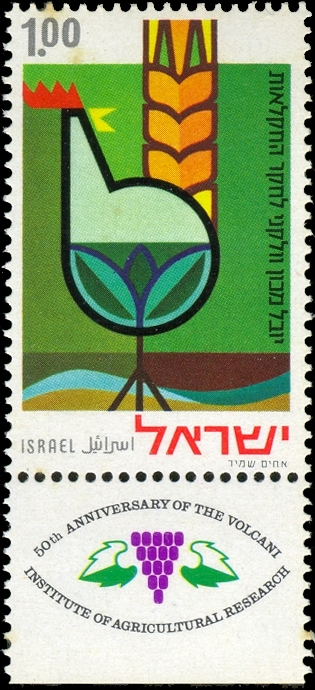
Israeli stamp commemorating the Volcani Center

In 2010, Jonathan Gressel of the Weizmann Institute received the Israel Prize for agricultural research. The prize committee chose Gressel, who is internationally known for his work in plant biotechnology, for breakthrough research in molecular structures that has major implications for the development of weed killers.

The Israel Prize for Agriculture was previously awarded to about 10 different scientists mainly from the Agricultural Research Organization (previously the Agricultural Experiment Station) and the Faculty of Agriculture of the Hebrew University among them Prof. Hillel Oppenheimer (1959) and Prof. Chanan Oppenheimer (1968).

In 2012, Daniel Hillel received the World Food Prize for his pioneering work in micro-irrigation techniques.

== See also ==
- Agriculture in Israel
- Benjamin Elazari Volcani
- Drip irrigation
- Economy of Israel
- History of agriculture in Palestine
- Negev Foundation
