= Moshe Levy (chemist) =

Israeli chemist

- משה לוי
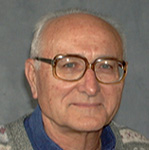
- Moshe Levy
- Born: December 8, 1927; Thessaloniki, Greece
- Died: September 28, 2015; Rehovot, Israel
- Citizenship: Israel
- Known for: the discovery of living polymerization, major contributions to solar energy
- Scientific career
- Fields: Polymers, Solar Energy
- Institutions: Weizmann Institute of Science
- Doctoral advisor: Michael Szwarc
- Doctoral students: Shlomo Margel

Moshe Levy (Hebrew: משה לוי; 1927-2015) was an Israeli professor of chemistry at the Weizmann Institute of Science in Rehovot, Israel.

== Birth and education ==
Moshe Levy was born on December 8, 1927, in Thessaloniki, Greece. In 1933 his father, Eliyahu, decided to immigrate to Palestine, then under British occupation. He grew up in the southern part of Tel-Aviv and attended the Alliance Elementary School and the Balfour High School. After graduating from high school, he went to work as a laboratory assistant at the Zeiff Institute in Rehovot. There, with the help of Chaim Weizmann (later the first president of the State of Israel) he obtained a scholarship to attend the Hebrew University of Jerusalem. Shortly after enrolling at the Hebrew University, he was called, as a member of the Haganah, to fight in the 1947–1949 Palestine war in Jerusalem, and only returned to the university in September 1949. He received a master's degree in Physical Chemistry in 1952. He finished his Ph.D. in 1955 after two years at the College of Forestry, State University of New York, Syracuse, SUNY-ESF, under the supervision of Michael Szwarc. He has been married to Joan Dvora Sugerman since 1955, and has two children, Sharona T. Levy and Alon Yitzchak Halevy, and has four grandchildren, Danielle and Itamar Menuhin, and Karina and Kasper Halevy. He lived in Rehovot, Israel.

== Academic career ==
As a post-doctoral fellow under Michael Szwarc, Moshe Levy was a member of the team who discovered "Living Polymers", which was a major breakthrough in the field of polymers science. The work was published as a one-page communication in the Journal of the American Chemical Society. Michael Szwarc received the Kyoto Prize for this work in 1987, acknowledging Moshe Levy for many of the breakthroughs leading to it. After a few years at the Technion and another year as a research fellow in Syracuse, he joined the Weizmann Institute of Science, in Rehovot, Israel. At the Weizmann Institute, he initially worked with Aharon Katzir, and later moved to the Plastics Research Department, which he headed from 1977 to 1983.

In 1982, he started working on solar energy. His work focused on creating a chemical reaction that enables storing the energy produced by the sun so it can be transported to a user site, and then (after the reverse reaction) be used upon request. With several colleagues, he built the solar tower at the Weizmann Institute that is a center for solar-energy research. In 1993 he became an emeritus professor, but has remained active in research and service, including serving as the president of the Israeli Polymer and Plastics Society in 1993–1995 and editor of the bulletin of the Israeli Chemical Society, Chemistry in Israel. Moshe Levy has also spent time as a visiting scientist in a number of institutions, including Xerox Research Center (Rochester, New York), DuPont Central Research Center (Wilmington, Delaware), the University of Florida at Gainesville, and the University of Minnesota, Minneapolis.
