= Avraham Fahn =

Israeli professor of botany (1916–2012)

Avraham Fahn אברהם פאהן
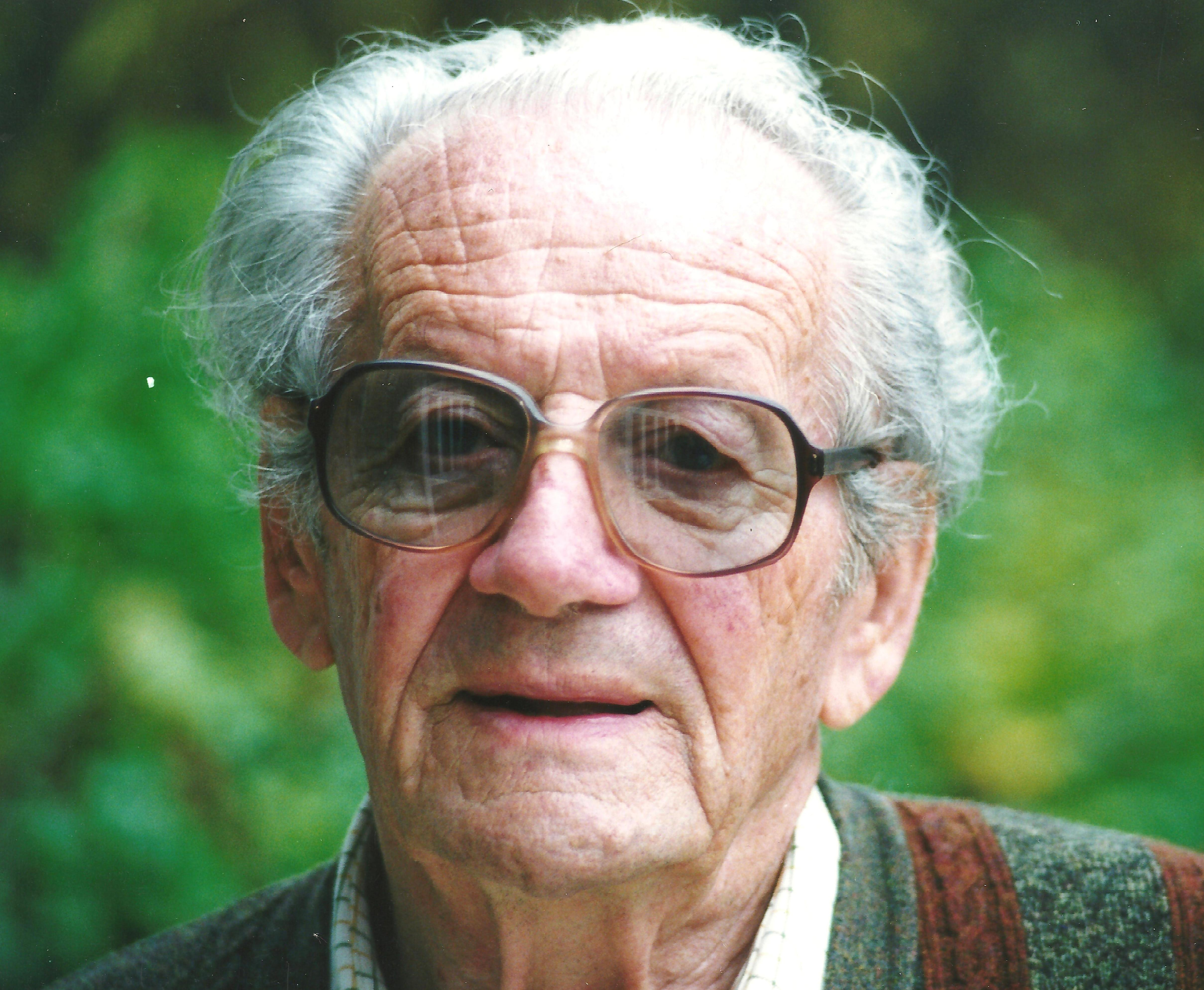
- Born: 8 August 1916; Vienna, Austria
- Died: 19 February 2012 (aged 95)
- Citizenship: Israeli
- Awards: Israel Prize (1963)

Avraham Fahn (Hebrew: אברהם פאהן; born 8 August 1916, died 19 February 2012) was an Israeli professor of botany at the Hebrew University of Jerusalem.

== Biography ==
Avraham Fahn was born in Vienna, Austria. He emigrated to Mandate Palestine and studied at the Hebrew University of Jerusalem, receiving a PhD in 1948.

== Academic career ==
In 1952, he joined the Hebrew University faculty, lecturing in botany. From 1952 to 1953, he was a research fellow at the University of Cambridge and in 1956 at Harvard University. He became an associate professor at the Hebrew University in 1960 and a full professor in 1965, serving as Dean of the faculty from 1964 to 1966 and pro-rector from 1969 to 1970.

Following the Six Days War in 1967, Fahn assisted in the restoration of the botanical gardens at the University's Mount Scopus campus. He also served for many years as head of the Forestry Department of the Volcani Institute of Agricultural Research.

Fahn retired in 1985. His books on the anatomy of plants have become basic texts in the field of botany.

== Awards and recognition ==
- In 1963, Fahn was awarded the Israel Prize, in life sciences.
- From 1995 to 1999, he served as Vice-President of the International Association of Botanists.

== See also ==
- List of Israel Prize recipients
