= Eli Putievsky =

Eli Putievsky אלי פוטיבסקי
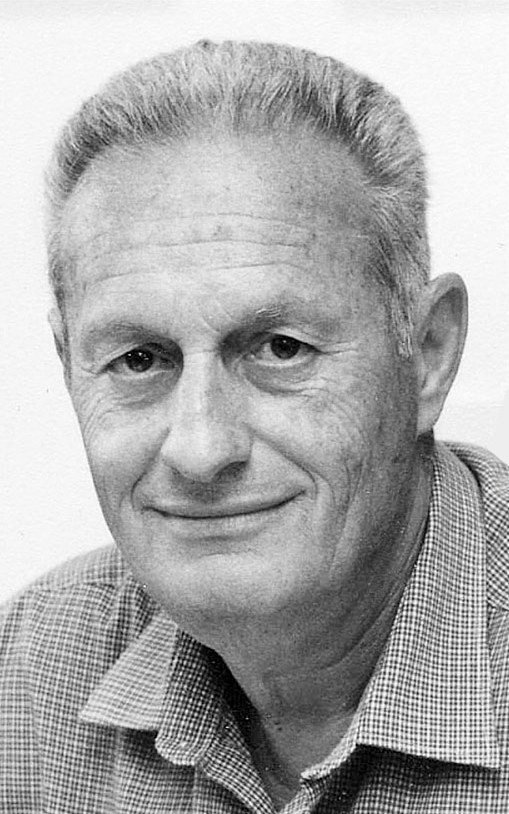
- Born: 1942
- Died: 2017 (aged 74–75)

Eli Putievsky (Hebrew: אלי פוטיבסקי; 1942–2017) was a botanist, a distinguished Israeli scientist at the Volcani Institute of Agricultural Research (ARO) in the field of medicinal plants, and the head of ARO during 1999-2007.

== Biography ==
Eli Putievsky was born in Tel-Aviv, the son of Moshe Putievsky and Miriam Perevosnik. He attended high school in Afula and served in the Israeli army as a transport officer. In 1963 he married Gila shutan and they have three children and eight grandchildren. In 1973 he completed his doctoral studies at the Hebrew University in Jerusalem. His doctoral dissertation was under the direction of Professors Daniel Zohary and Joseph Katznelson. In 1973 he joined the staff at the Agricultural Research Station of Newe Ya’ar, and established a unit for research and cultivation of herbs, both fresh and medicinal. His research advanced the agricultural sector of growing fresh herbs in Israel, and his findings gave him an international reputation. During his years of research he was invited to hundreds of international conferences to present Israeli achievements in research and development in fresh herbal production. In 1993 he was appointed director of Newe Yaar research station, and was instrumental in transforming it from a local research station to the northern center of the ARO. He also taught biology at the agricultural school at Nahalal, and gave many lectures in his area of expertise in courses at a number of colleges and universities, including Ruppin, the Technion, and the Faculty of Agriculture of the Hebrew University. In 1999 Dr. Putievsky was appointed head of Volcani Institute of Agricultural Research (ARO), a position he held until 2007. He retired in 2009.

== His research activities and contribution to agriculture ==
- As part of his research in plant genetics he elucidated the cyto-genetic relations between species of clover and Glycine (family Fabaceae), Emex (Polygonaceae) and Ocimum (Lamiaceae). His work on this subject contributed to genetic breeding processes and to the transfer of beneficial properties of wild plants into cultivated varieties of these plants. An outcome of this work was the development of two new clover varieties as "Achziv" and "Sefi".
- He investigated the anatomy and physiology of essential oil production of aromatic plants, and the factors affecting the yield and quality and optimization of the growth process for producing essential oils.
- He established the industrial production of fresh and dried herbs in Israel, including the development of the drying processes of various species.
- He initiated the cultivation and breeding programs for herbs collected from wild species in Israel and other parts of the world and developed them into agriculturally important species. The major herbal crops developed and currently leading Israeli and international agriculture include oregano, hyssop, sage, basil and curly parsley. In addition, he developed varieties of caraway (family Apiaceae) increased in essential oil of high quality that do not release the seeds before harvest. With caraway he was successful in transforming a biennial crop (giving seeds only on the second year) into an annual crop.
- In the 1980s he was a pioneer in the development of the export industry of fresh herbs from Israel to European markets. This became a new and successful branch of the agricultural export industry. His research results contributed to the development of this industry, and consequently Israel has become a leading provider of fresh herbs to Europe.

== Activities and contribution to the Agricultural Research Organization ==
- He Initiated and founded the Israel Gene Bank as part of the International Plant Genetic Resources Institute (IPGRI) organization with the help of donations, particularly from the Rothschild Foundation.
- He initiated the conservation of wild plants of agricultural importance in the Israel Gene Bank, while implementing innovative methods used in modern plant gene banks worldwide.
- He initiated and carried out reforms in the organizational structure and physical plant of ARO, which led to significantly streamlined administrative expenses, and encouraged and increased collaboration between researchers from different disciplines. In addition he instigated changes in the institutes, departments and research groups constituting ARO.
- He forged an agreement with the Ministry of Finance which led to more efficient distribution of personnel and rewarded researchers for personal achievements. He led the negotiations for an agreement with the Treasury that allowed the absorption of many new researchers in various fields including the areas of genomics, proteomics, and precision agriculture.
- He arranged transfer of all the administration of ARO to the new building of the Ministry of Agriculture in the campus of the Volcani Center, and arranged the use of the old administrative building for other units of the Ministry of Agriculture.
- He oversaw the development of an advanced computerized administration system with real-time links to the distant centers (Newe Ya’ar and Gilat) and the Volcani Center.
- He established a unit aimed to promote agricultural research and development the purpose of which was to link with businesses, while protecting intellectual property rights. This unit is similar to the ones in the universities which seek to commercialize research results.
