= Ellen Graber =

American-Israeli research scientist

- אלן גרבר
- Education: PhD - University of Michigan M.Sc. - University of Texas at Austin B.A. - Cornell University
- Scientific career
- Fields: Environmental Science
- Workplaces: Volcani Center
- Thesis: Sedimentology, diagenesis, and secular delta carbon-13 variations in the upper Horquilla limestone (Pennsylvanian/Permian) of New Mexico. (1989)

Ellen Graber (Hebrew: אלן גרבר) is an American-Israeli research scientist in the field of environmental sciences. She is a senior scientist at the Volcani Agricultural Research Center (full professor equivalent), and is known for her work on biochar, for which she received the "Scientist of the Year Award" in 2013.In 2019, she began work on Cocoa tree resiliency, starting the Cocoa Cure Center within the Volcani Center. Her work was interrupted by the October 7 Hamas attack on Israel and the subsequent Gaza war, which led her to abandon some of her seedlings for five months to the elements of the Negev Desert. Some of the samples survived, and were studied for their resilient properties. 70% of the surviving plants were able to subsequently develop normally, and further research showed that they were all from the same genetic group.In 2025 she published an article focused on finding substances that could be used to naturally support disease control and pest resistance without the use of pesticides. The research found that Melanoidins' when used in support with Jasmonic acid and other similar hormone processes within plants can encourage a natural immune response and improve longevity.
