= Chanan Oppenheimer =

Chanan (Heinz) Oppenheimer (22 May 1905 – 4 November 1978) was an Israeli agronomist and agricultural researcher who specialized in tropical and subtropical fruit cultivation. He was a professor at the Faculty of Agriculture of the Hebrew University of Jerusalem and also served as a senior researcher and administrator at the Volcani Center, the Agricultural Research Organization of Israel. Oppenheimer was awarded the Israel Prize in Agriculture in 1968 for his contributions to agricultural science in Israel.

== Biography ==
Oppenheimer was born as Heinz Oppenheimer in Berlin, Germany, into a Jewish family. His father was the German biochemist Carl Nathan Oppenheimer. He was named after his From 1929 and 1932 he studied at the Landwirtschaftliche Hochschule (Agricultural College) in Berlin, which from 1934 became part of the University of Berlin. His specialization was horticulture (fruit cultivation), and his doctoral thesis was entitled: Cytogenetic studies on hybrids of tuberous Solanum species. (Cytogenetische Untersuchungen an Bastarden Knollentragender Solanum-Arten)

He immigrated to the Land of Israel in 1932 at the invitation of Otto Warburg, the well known German-Jewish botanist, who had set up a new agricultural experiment station in 1921 in Ben Shemen. Renamed the Agricultural Research Station it moved to Rehovot in 1932.

He also worked in the Institute for Agricultural Studies of Hebrew University, which became the Faculty of Agriculture of the Hebrew University in Rehovot in 1953, teaching the cultivation of tropical fruit trees. In 1955 he was appointed lecturer, in 1962 he was promoted to associate professor, and in 1969 he was promoted to full professor.

He died in Rehovot on 4 November 1978 and is buried in Kibbutz Lahav.

== Scientific work ==
Oppenheimer's work focused particularly on the introduction, cultivation, and breeding of tropical and subtropical fruit species suited to the climatic conditions of the Mediterranean and semi-arid environments. It contributed significantly to the development of fruit agriculture in Israel.

His research included:

- Introduction and acclimatization of tropical fruit crops to Israeli climates
- Breeding and hybridization of new fruit varieties
- Studies on horticultural techniques for subtropical species

Beginning with his arrival, Oppenheimer planted and managed acclimatization gardens in Rehovot and Degania Alef, which he established in honor of the sixtieth birthday of Dr. Arthur Ruppin. Throughout his career he carried out this work in cooperation with local researchers, nursery growers, and orchard growers.

Prof. Oppenheimer conducted many and diverse studies which resulted in creation of new varieties of fruits and vegetables, including:

Citrus fruit – creation of new varieties through hybridization; investigation of the composition of Shamouti oranges.

Creation of varieties of deciduous fruit trees – by crossing foreign varieties and local types he mixed planting of varieties of apples, pears, plums, and almonds. He developed fruit-tree cultivation in the Arava and the Sea of Galilee region. One of his key successes was the hybridization of an early-ripening apple variety requiring relatively few chilling hours, which he named “Vered”, after his daughter.

He founded and developed the subtropical fruit tree industry in Israel. Among other achievements, he contributed to the acclimatization of avocado, cherimoya, persimmon, guava, and mango trees. In 1950s he discovered a new variety of mango which he named the Maya, in honor of his wife, Maya. The variety is noted for its very juicy flavor.

== Awards and recognition ==
- 1949-Joseph Eliyahu Chelouche Prize of the Jewish National Fund (JNF) for developing a new apple variety (first prize).
- 1968 -Israel Prize in Agriculture, 1968, for contributions to agricultural science in Israel.
- In his article on Avocado research in Israel, Bergh refers to Oppenheimer as "sagacious pioneer of Israeli horticulture and "grand old man" of world subtropical fruits..."

== Publications ==
Oppenheimer published many studies in Israeli and international journals, wrote numerous articles in Hebrew intended for farmers, and he guided growers in courses, study days, in the field, and in orchards. He produced updated editions of books on subtropical orchards, including:

- Cultivation of New Tropical and Subtropical Fruit Trees (Rehovot Experimental Station, 1947)
- Cultivation of New Subtropical Fruit Trees (Sifriyat HaSadeh, 1955)
- Cultivation of Subtropical FruitTrees (Am Oved, Sifriyat HaSadeh, 1978)

=== Selected publications (in English) ===
- Oppenheimer, Chanan. "On citrus fertilization with special reference to seediness and seedlessness of the Jaffa orange." (1935): 19360300550.
- Oppenheimer, Chanan. "The acclimatisation of new tropical and subtropical fruit trees in Palestine." (1947): 184-pp.
- Oppenheimer, Chanan. "The avocado industry in Palestine." California Avocado Society Yearbook 1947 (1947): 112-119.
- Oppenheimer, C. H., and O. Reuveni. "Rooting macadamia cuttings." California Macadamia Society Yearbook 7 (1961): 52-56.
- Oppenheimer Chanan, and Amnon Kadman. Normal nutrition and nutritional disturbances in the avocado. Division of Publications, National and University Institute of Agriculture, 1962.
- Oppenheimer, Chanan. "Topography, rootstocks, varieties and tree size as factors in the reaction of mango trees to low temperatures." (1965): 379-84.
- Oppenheimer, Chanan, and Oded Reuveni. "Investigation into the causes and possible correction of disturbed date palm fruit set in the Northern Negev." Rehovot. Agricultural Research Station Pamphlet (1965).
- Oppenheimer, Chanan. "Nimrod-a new mango variety selected in Israel." (1968): 358-9.

=== Publications which reference Oppenheimer's research ===
- Dowson, Valentine Hugh Wilfred, and Albert Aten. Dates: Handling, Processing and Packing: Handling, Processing and Packing. Vol. 72. Food & Agriculture Org., 1962.
- Bergh, B. O. "Avocado research in Israel." Calif. Avocado Soc. Yearb 58 (1975): 103-126.
- Von Suffrin, Dana. "The possibility of a productive palestine: Otto warburg and botanical zionism." Israel Studies 26.2 (2021): 173-197.
