= Negev Foundation =

Non-profit organization in the US

The Negev Foundation
- Type: Non-profit organization
- Purpose: Agricultural development and economic sustainability in the Negev Desert
- Headquarters: Cleveland, Ohio, United States
- Region served: Ohio and Israel
- Services: Project coordination, research funding, agricultural development support
- Fields: Agriculture, desert sustainability, research and development
- Website: negev.org

The Negev Foundation is a Cleveland, Ohio, based non-profit, tax-exempt organization that promotes the agricultural development and economic sustainability of the Negev Desert in Israel.

== The Foundation ==
The Negev Foundation promotes agricultural innovations that allow farmers to utilize the desert's arid lands and brackish water as tools to successfully cultivate a wide range of crops. In 2008, the organization was recognized by Charity Navigator for its fourth consecutive year of having a four star C.N. efficiency rating.

== Notable projects ==
=== The Ohio-Israel Agriculture Initiative of the Negev Foundation ===
Since 2002, The Negev Foundation has overseen the Ohio-Israel Agriculture Initiative. This initiative has coordinated and developed projects engaging both the Ohio and Israel agricultural industries in the areas of trade, exhibition, research and development projects. For example, students from Hocking College in Nelsonville, Ohio received funded internships from the initiative to gain work experience at fish farms in Israel. The Initiative has also funded research projects including one where Israeli cattle were inseminated by bull semen from Ohio to evaluate breed quality and innovative artificial insemination processes.

=== The Ramat Negev AgroResearch Center and George V. and Janet Voinovich Business Center ===
In a long-term effort to conquer the challenges of achieving sustainability in the desert, The Negev Foundation secured funding for permanent research facilities and a unique, regional business center. The foundation inaugurated the 13,000-square-foot (1,200 m^{2}) combined research and business center in December 2007. The George V. and Janet Voinovich Business Center is named for the U.S. senator and his wife as a tribute to their work and friendship with Israel. The Foundation also supports the Ramat Negev AgroResearch Center where researchers seek to develop innovations to improve desert agricultural tools and techniques.

== See also ==
- Agriculture in Israel
- Agricultural Research in Israel
- The Negev
