= Avraham Zilberberg =

Israeli politician (1915–1980)

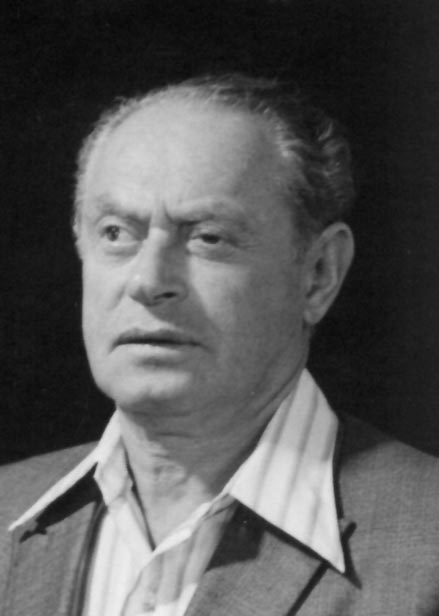

Faction represented in the Knesset
- 1969–1977: Alignment

Personal details
- Born: 15 December 1915
- Died: 19 June 1980 (aged 64)

Avraham Zilberberg (Hebrew: אברהם זילברברג; born 15 December 1915, died 19 June 1980) was an Israeli politician who served as a member of the Knesset for the Alignment between 1969 and 1977.

== Biography ==
Born in an area that later became Poland, Zilberberg spent World War II in Siberia. He emigrated to Israel in 1948, and was one of the founders of Beit Elazari, the first moshav founded by new immigrants. He became one of the leaders of the Moshavim Movement, serving as its deputy general secretary, and was also chairman of the moshav constituent of the Labor Party.

In 1969 Zilberberg was elected to the Knesset on the Alignment list (an alliance of the Labor Party and Mapam). He was re-elected in 1973, but lost his seat in the 1977 elections.

He died in 1980 at the age of 64.
