= Gila Finkelstein =

Israeli politician (born 1950)

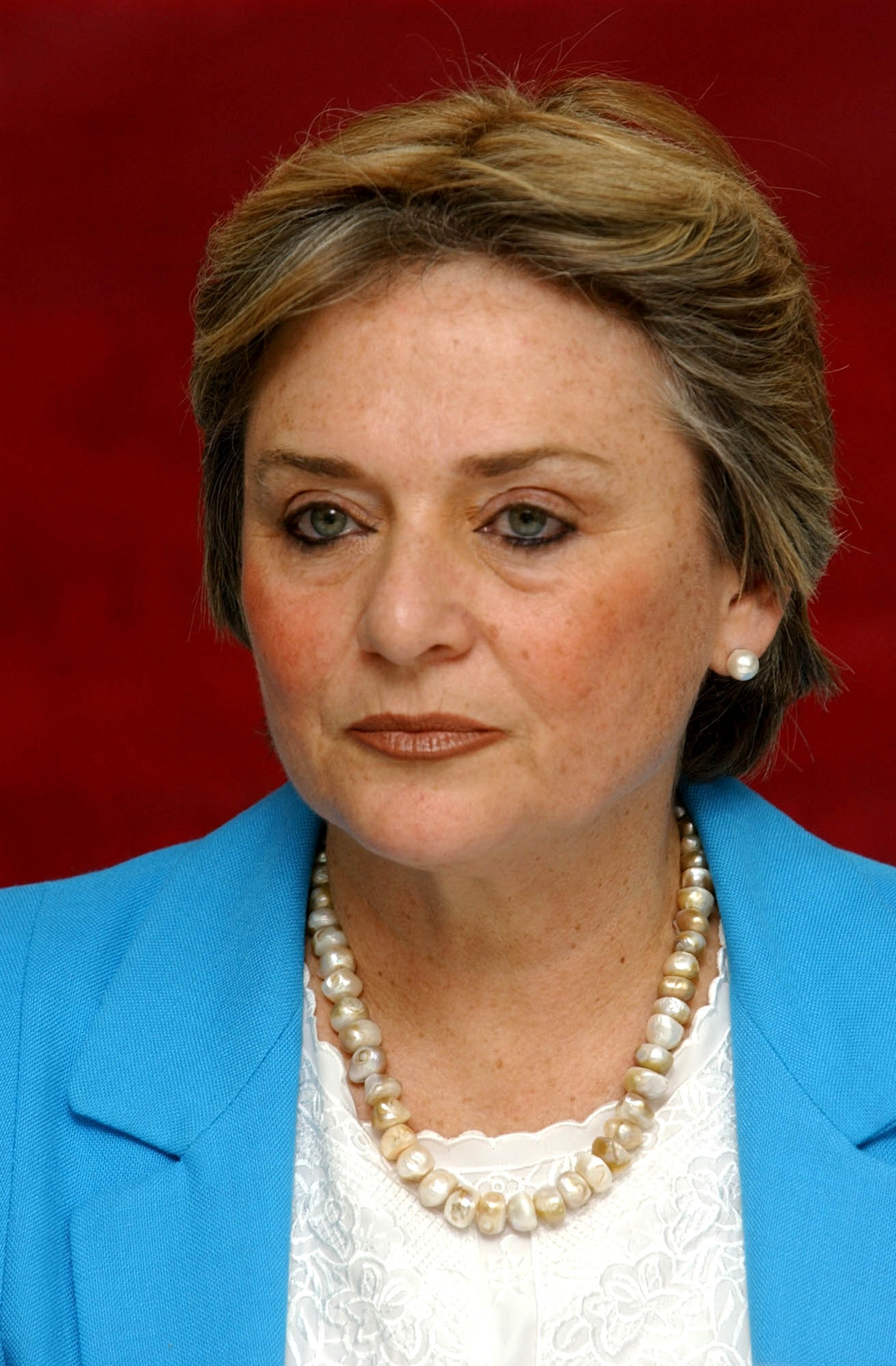
- Finkelstein in the mid-2000s

Faction represented in the Knesset
- 2003–2006: National Religious Party

Personal details
- Born: 22 September 1950 (age 75) Tel Aviv, Israel

Gila Finkelstein (Hebrew: גילה פינקלשטיין; born 22 September 1950) is an Israeli former politician who served as a member of the Knesset for the National Religious Party between 2003 and 2006.

== Biography ==
Born Gila Margil in 1950 in Tel Aviv, Finkelstein studied at the Dizengoff religious state elementary school and then at Zeitlin High School in the city, before studying English and Israeli history at Tel Aviv University, where she gained a BA and a teaching certificate. She went on to gain an MA in educational management, and work as an English teacher and headmistress.

In 2003 she was elected to the Knesset on the National Religious Party list, and was appointed a Deputy Speaker of the Knesset. Finkelstein was also chairwoman of the subcommittee for Learning Disabilities, and a member of the Education, Culture and Sports committee, the committee on the Status of Women, and the committee on the Rights of the Child.

For the 2006 elections she was placed tenth on the joint National Union-National Religious Party list, but lost her seat when the alliance won only nine seats. She was placed 18th on the Jewish Home list for the 2013 elections, in which the party won 12 seats.

In March 2022 she was chosen as "Yakir Ha’ir" of Tel Aviv for her contribution to the development of the city and to the education of children and youth in the city.

Her brother is Prof. Shlomo Margel.
