= Al-Maghar =

Al-Maghar المغار
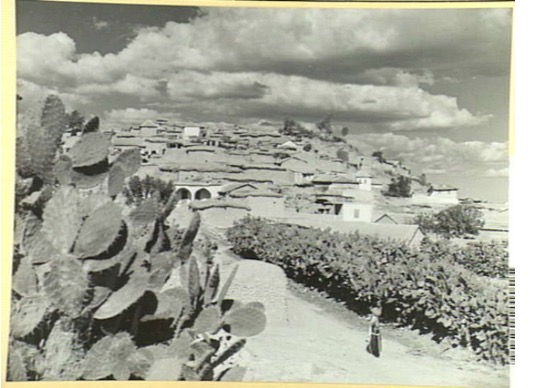
- Al-Maghar, 1940
- Etymology: The caves
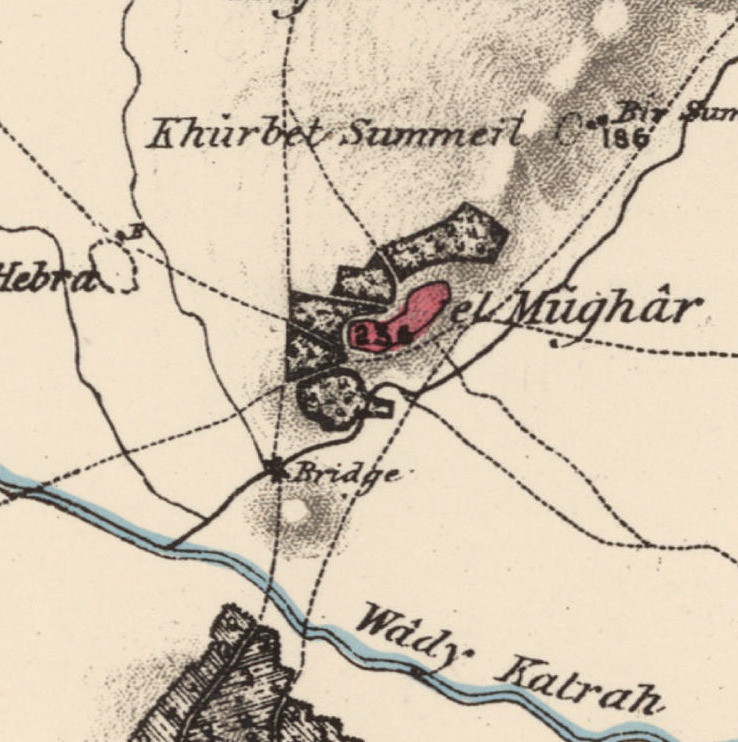
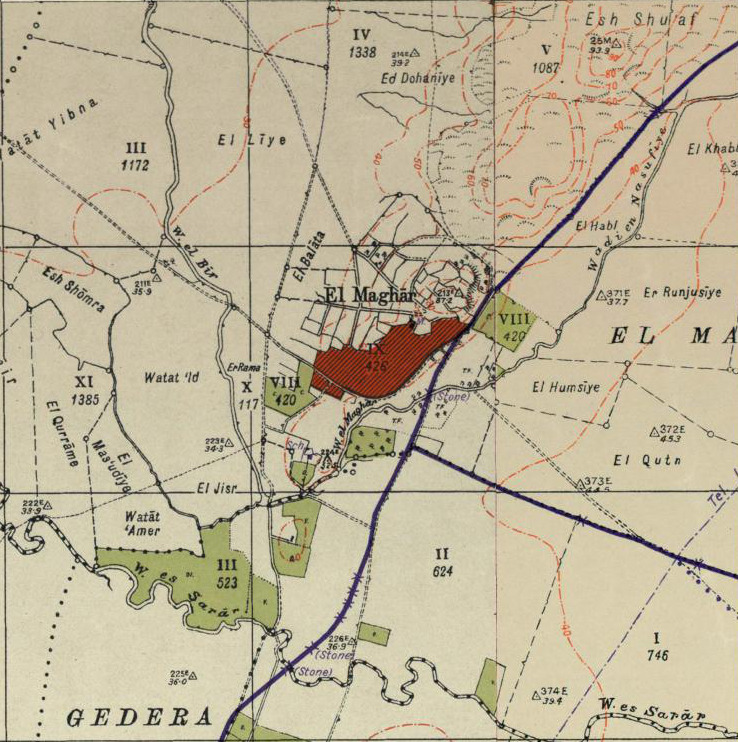
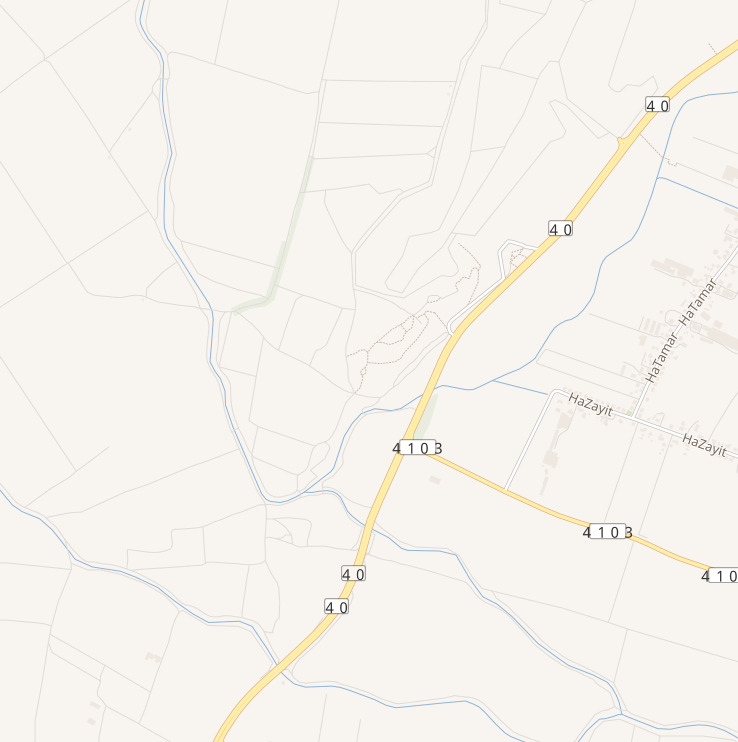
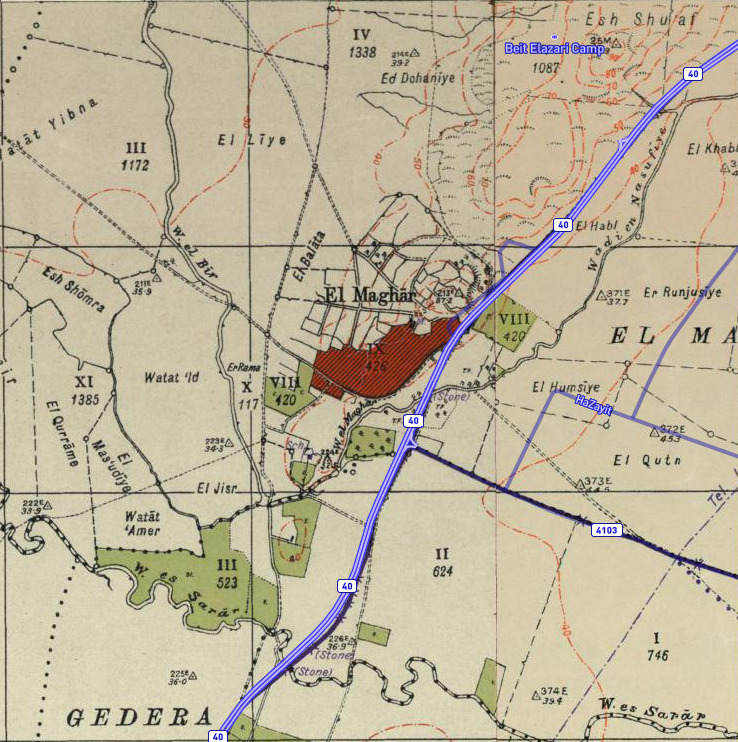
- 1870s map 1940s map modern map 1940s with modern overlay map A series of historical maps of the area around Al-Maghar (click the buttons)

- Location within Mandatory Palestine
- Coordinates: 31°50′19″N 34°46′56″E
- Palestine grid: 129/138
- Geopolitical entity: Mandatory Palestine
- Subdistrict: Ramle
- Date of depopulation: 18 May 1948

Area
  - Total: 15,390 dunams (15.39 km^{2}; 5.94 sq mi)

Population (1945)
  - Total: 1,740
- Cause(s) of depopulation: Military assault by Yishuv forces
- Current Localities: Beit Elazari

Al-Maghar was a Palestinian Arab village in the Ramle Subdistrict of Mandatory Palestine. It was depopulated by the Givati Brigade during Operation Barak on 18 May 1948. It was located 12 km southwest of Ramla, situated north of Wadi al-Maghar.

== History ==
An inscription which was in Greek, and dated to a Christian period was found here.

In the 8th century, the village was the birthplace of the Islamic jurist Abu al-Hasan Muhammad al-Maghari.

=== Ottoman era ===
In 1517, Al-Maghar, like the rest of Palestine, was incorporated into the Ottoman Empire, and in the 1596 tax registers the village appeared under the name of Imgar, as being in the nahiya (subdistrict) of Gaza under the Liwa of Gaza, with a population was 22 households, all Muslim. The villagers paid a fixed tax rate of 33,3% on various agricultural products, such as wheat, barley, summer crops, fruit trees, olive trees, and sesame; a total of 6,400 akçe.

In 1838, el Mughar was noted by Edward Robinson from Aqir, he further noted it as a Muslim village in the Gaza district.

In 1863 Victor Guérin found a village with about 200 inhabitants living in adobe houses. He further noted "vast fields, of which the extreme fertility delights the sight." The barley was already partially harvested, and elsewhere the plain was seeded with corn and durrah.

An Ottoman village list of about 1870 indicated 54 houses and a population of 174, though the population count included men, only.

In 1882, the PEF's Survey of Western Palestine (SWP) described it as consisting almost entirely of adobe houses, "occupying the south slope of the hill, and built in front of caves in the rock. There are fig-gardens beneath, and pasture-land round it on the north and east. The village is not larger than most of those in the plain." "It has two wells: one north, one west." Figs were noted here.

The Battle of Mughar Ridge between British and Ottoman forces in the World War I was fought in the environs of Al-Maghar.

=== British Mandate era ===
In the 1922 census of Palestine conducted by the British Mandate authorities, Mughar had a population of 966 inhabitants, all Muslims, while in the 1931 census, Mughar had 255 occupied houses and a population of 1,211 Muslims.

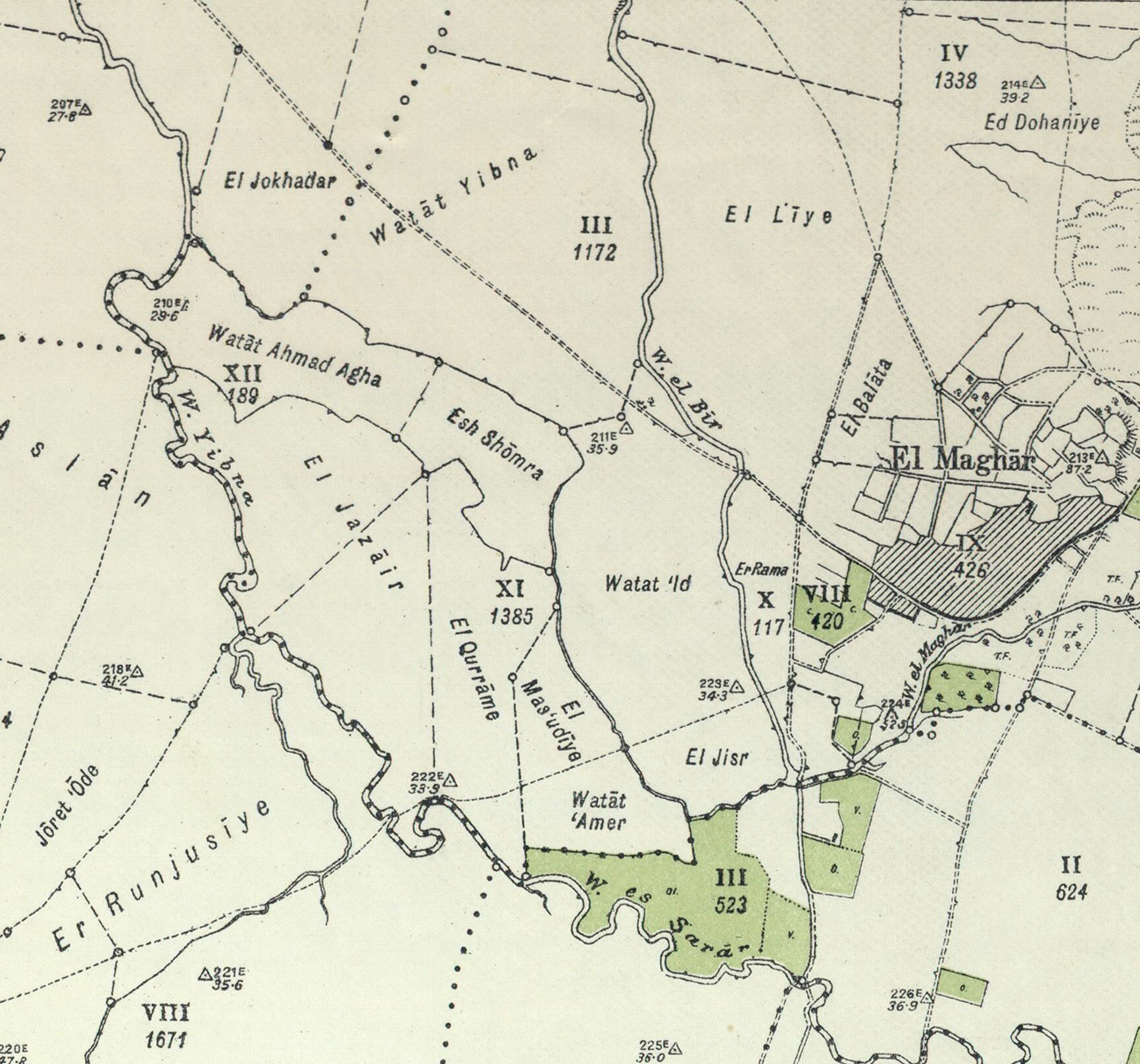
El Maghar 1930 1:20,000

In the 1945 statistics, it had a population of 1,740 Muslims, and the total land area was 15,390 dunums. Of this, Arabs used a total of 1,772 dunums for citrus and bananas, 9,075 dunums were used for cereals, 86 dunums were irrigated or used for orchards, while 31 dunams were classified as built-up urban areas.

It had an elementary school and in 1945, it had an enrollment of 170 students.

=== 1948, and aftermath ===
The village was attacked, occupied and depopulated on 18 May 1948. In June 1948, the village was destroyed to prevent the return of the inhabitants. In early 1949, American Quaker relief workers reported that many of those living in tents in what became Maghazi refugee camp had come from Al-Maghar.

The Israeli moshav of Beit Elazari is built on the land of the destroyed Palestinian town of Al-Maghar.

== Bibliography ==
- Barron, J.B., ed. (1923). Palestine: Report and General Abstracts of the Census of 1922. Government of Palestine.
- Clermont-Ganneau, C.S. (1874). "Letters from M. Clermont-Ganneau". Palestine Exploration Quarterly. 6: 261-280.
- Conder, C.R.; Kitchener, H.H. (1882). The Survey of Western Palestine: Memoirs of the Topography, Orography, Hydrography, and Archaeology. Vol. 2. London: Committee of the Palestine Exploration Fund.
- Government of Palestine, Department of Statistics (1945). Village Statistics, April, 1945.
- Guérin, V. (1869). Description Géographique Historique et Archéologique de la Palestine (in French). Vol. 1: Judee, pt. 2. Paris: L'Imprimerie Nationale.
- Hadawi, S. (1970). Village Statistics of 1945: A Classification of Land and Area ownership in Palestine. Palestine Liberation Organization Research Centre. Archived from the original on 2018-12-08.
- Hartmann, M. (1883). "Die Ortschaftenliste des Liwa Jerusalem in dem türkischen Staatskalender für Syrien auf das Jahr 1288 der Flucht (1871)". Zeitschrift des Deutschen Palästina-Vereins. 6: 102–149.
- Hütteroth, W.-D.; Abdulfattah, K. (1977). Historical Geography of Palestine, Transjordan and Southern Syria in the Late 16th Century. Erlanger Geographische Arbeiten, Sonderband 5. Erlangen, Germany: Vorstand der Fränkischen Geographischen Gesellschaft. ISBN 3-920405-41-2.
- Khalidi, W. (1992). All That Remains: The Palestinian Villages Occupied and Depopulated by Israel in 1948. Washington D.C.: Institute for Palestine Studies. ISBN 0-88728-224-5.
- Mills, E., ed. (1932). Census of Palestine 1931. Population of Villages, Towns and Administrative Areas. Jerusalem: Government of Palestine.
- Morris, B. (2004). The Birth of the Palestinian Refugee Problem Revisited. Cambridge University Press. ISBN 978-0-521-00967-6.
- Palmer, E.H. (1881). The Survey of Western Palestine: Arabic and English Name Lists Collected During the Survey by Lieutenants Conder and Kitchener, R. E. Transliterated and Explained by E.H. Palmer. Committee of the Palestine Exploration Fund.
- Robinson, E.; Smith, E. (1841). Biblical Researches in Palestine, Mount Sinai and Arabia Petraea: A Journal of Travels in the year 1838. Vol. 3. Boston: Crocker & Brewster.
- Socin, A. (1879). "Alphabetisches Verzeichniss von Ortschaften des Paschalik Jerusalem". Zeitschrift des Deutschen Palästina-Vereins. 2: 135–163.
