= Shimon Mazeh =

- שמעון מזא"ה
- Shimon Mazeh, November 28, 1941
- Born: Russian: Мазе Шимон; September 3, 1907; Vitebsk, Russian Empire
- Died: April 2, 2000 (aged 92); Bethlehem, Palestine
- Burial place: Military cemetery at Mount Herzl
- Military career
- Allegiance: United Kingdom; Israel
- Branch: Jewish Brigade; Haganah; Israel Defense Forces
- Service years: 1933–1955
- Rank: Aluf
- Commands: Head of combat service support; Head of the Manpower Directorate, 1949 – December 1952
- Conflicts: World War II; 1947–1949 Palestine war
- Other work: President of Cotton Farmers of Israel; Representative of Israel Food and Agriculture Organization of the United Nations

Shimon Mazeh (Sometimes spelled Shimon Maz'ah; Hebrew: שמעון מזא"ה; September 3, 1907 – April 2, 2000) was Haganah fighter, a major general in the Israel Defense Forces, an agronomist, and a businessman. He served as the head of the Manpower Directorate from 1949 until December 1952.

== Biography ==
From left to right: Zvi Ayalon, Moshe Tzadok, Yaakov Dori, Shimon Mazeh, Mordechai Maklef, and Shlomo Shamir

Mazeh was born in the Russian Empire and grew up in Germany. During his teens he joined the Blau Weiss, a Jewish youth movement. He studied agronomy in Germany, Italy and France and completed his doctorate. In 1931 Mazeh migrated to Israel. He became a researcher for the Volcani Institute of Agricultural Research in Rehovot.

=== British Army and the Israel Defense Forces ===
Mazeh joined the Haganah in 1933. He volunteered in the British Army during World War II. He served in a transport unit and after the formation of the Jewish Brigade he commanded the brigade's supply unit in Europe. During the 1947–1949 Palestine war he became the founder of the combat service support of the IDF which he headed until May 1949. The division consisted of a number of sub-services: Food services, Fuel services, Equipment services, Transportation services, and service dogs and horses.

After a short stay in the United States, Mazeh was appointed to the head of the Manpower Directorate on October 9, 1949. His success in the combat service support proved to be invaluable for his work in the Manpower Directorate. Mazeh served this position until 1952 when he was succeeded by Tzvi Tzur.

=== After his release from the IDF ===
At 1955 Mazeh was released of his military service and went into private business. With the aid of foreign investors Mazeh founded an agricultural corporation named "מגל" ("sickle"). The company, which focused on growing mainly cotton and sugar beet, operated near Kibbutz Hazor and Gan Yavne. They also managed a number orchards in the area. At the time Mazeh became the President of Cotton Farmers of Israel. During the late 1960s and early 1970s Mazeh represented the organization in the Food and Agriculture Organization of the United Nations.

Mazeh died in 2000. He is buried in the Military cemetery at Mount Herzl.
