= Shlomo Margel =

Israeli chemist

- שלמה מרגל
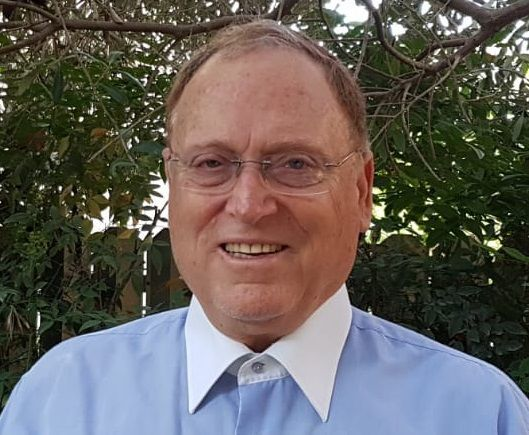
- Born: October 9, 1945 (age 80); Israel
- Citizenship: Israeli
- Education: Bar Ilan University; Weizmann Institute of Science
- Known for: Nanotechnology for Biomedical applications
- Scientific career
- Fields: Chemistry, Nanomaterials
- Workplaces: Bar-Ilan University
- Doctoral advisor: Moshe Levy
- Other academic advisors: Fred C. Anson (Caltech); Alan Rembaum (Caltech)

Shlomo Margel (Hebrew: שלמה מרגל; born 9 October 1945) is a Professor of Chemistry at Bar Ilan University specializing in polymers, biopolymers, functional thin films, encapsulation, surface chemistry, nanotechnology, nanobiotechnology and agro-nanotechnology.

== Early life ==
Shlomo Margel was born in 1945 in Israel during the Mandate era into a seven-generation Jerusalemite family. The Margel family descended from the Loewy (Hebrew: לעווי), Menachem Mendel (Hebrew: מנחם מנדל משקלוב) and Rivlin families. Their family trees merged several generations ago and they were all students of the Vilna Gaon (HaGra).

== Academic career ==
He obtained his Ph.D. from the Department of Materials Science at the Weizmann Institute of Science in 1976, followed by three years as a postdoctoral fellow at the Department of Inorganic Chemistry, California Institute of Technology (Caltech). In 1988 he joined the Bar-Ilan Department of Chemistry and has risen through the ranks to full professor in 1994. Margel was a visiting scientist in DuPont Central Research, Wilmington, Delaware, in the University of Ulm, Germany, in Tokyo Institute of Technology, Japan and in Massachusetts Institute of Technology (MIT), Institute for Soldiers' Nanotechnologies. Margel chaired the Bar-Ilan Chemistry Department (1999-2001), served as the dean of the Bar-Ilan Faculty of Exact Sciences (2002-2003) and was the Bar-Ilan dean of students (2011-2014). He was the head of the National Committee for Chemistry in High School Education (2000-2003) and the president of the Israel Chemical Society (2006-2009). The Israel Academy of Sciences and Humanities designated him to be the Israeli chairman of the National Committee of Chemistry towards IUPAC during 2010-2013. In addition, during 2014-2017 he served as the president and head of the Washington College for Education, Yavne. In 2016, Prof. Margel was chosen to lead the establishment of a new agro-nanotechnology center in the Volcani Institute for Agriculture, Beit Dagan.

== Scientific interests and publications ==
Margel earlier interests included electrochemistry of vinylic monomer and polymers, polyaldehyde microspheres and self-assembly monolayers. His current research focuses on functional polymeric nano/micro-particles for medical and industrial applications, surface modification, and functional thin coatings (self-cleaning, anti-biofouling, UV absorbers, anti-fogging and superhydrophobic coatings). Prof. Margel is a world pioneer and gained international reputation in the area of nanotechnology, particularly in the design of functional nano- and micrometer-sized particles of very narrow size distribution for medical and industrial applications. Many of his publications were collected to a book titled "Recent advances in polymers & nanotechnology".

During his career, Prof. Margel supervised over 100 students. He has over 300 peer-reviewed articles in print, which were cited nearly 8,100 times. Margel has published many book chapters on various aspects of nanoparticles and functional thin coatings, won about 75 national and international research grants and has about 40 patents and patent applications.

Among his previous awards were the Dr. Chaim Weizmann Postdoctoral Fellowship for Scientific Research, established by the Myron A. Bantrell Trust (1976-1978); Shmuel Yaroslavsky Memorial Prize for Study on the Development of Microspheres for Medical Applications, awarded by the Scientific Committee of the Weizmann Institute of Science (1984); M. Landau Grant Foundation for Achievement in the Area of Polymers, awarded by Mifal HaPayis (1989); Taubenblat Prize for studies on Bioactive Wound Dressing & Particles (2003); The Elias, Genevieve and Georgianna Atol Charitable Trust Fellow in Nanomedicine (2003) and the Israel Vacuum Society (IVS) Excellency Award for Research (2014).

== Personal life ==
Shlomo Margel is married to Hannah Margel, a Ph.D. in Science Teaching from the Weizmann Institute of Science. They live in Rehovot and have four children and seven grandchildren. His sister is former MK Gila Finkelstein.
