= Itzhak Arnon =

Israeli agronomist (1909–2005)

- יצחק ארנון
- Born: Isaac Aharonowitz; 1909; Antwerp, Belgium
- Died: 2005 (aged 95–96); Israel
- Education: Gembloux Agro-Bio Tech; Hebrew University of Jerusalem
- Known for: Establishing agricultural research stations in Israel
- Awards: 1971: Israel Prize for agriculture
- Scientific career
- Fields: Agronomy
- Workplaces: Agricultural Experimental Station, Acre; Neve Yaar Agricultural Station; Volcani Institute of Agricultural Research

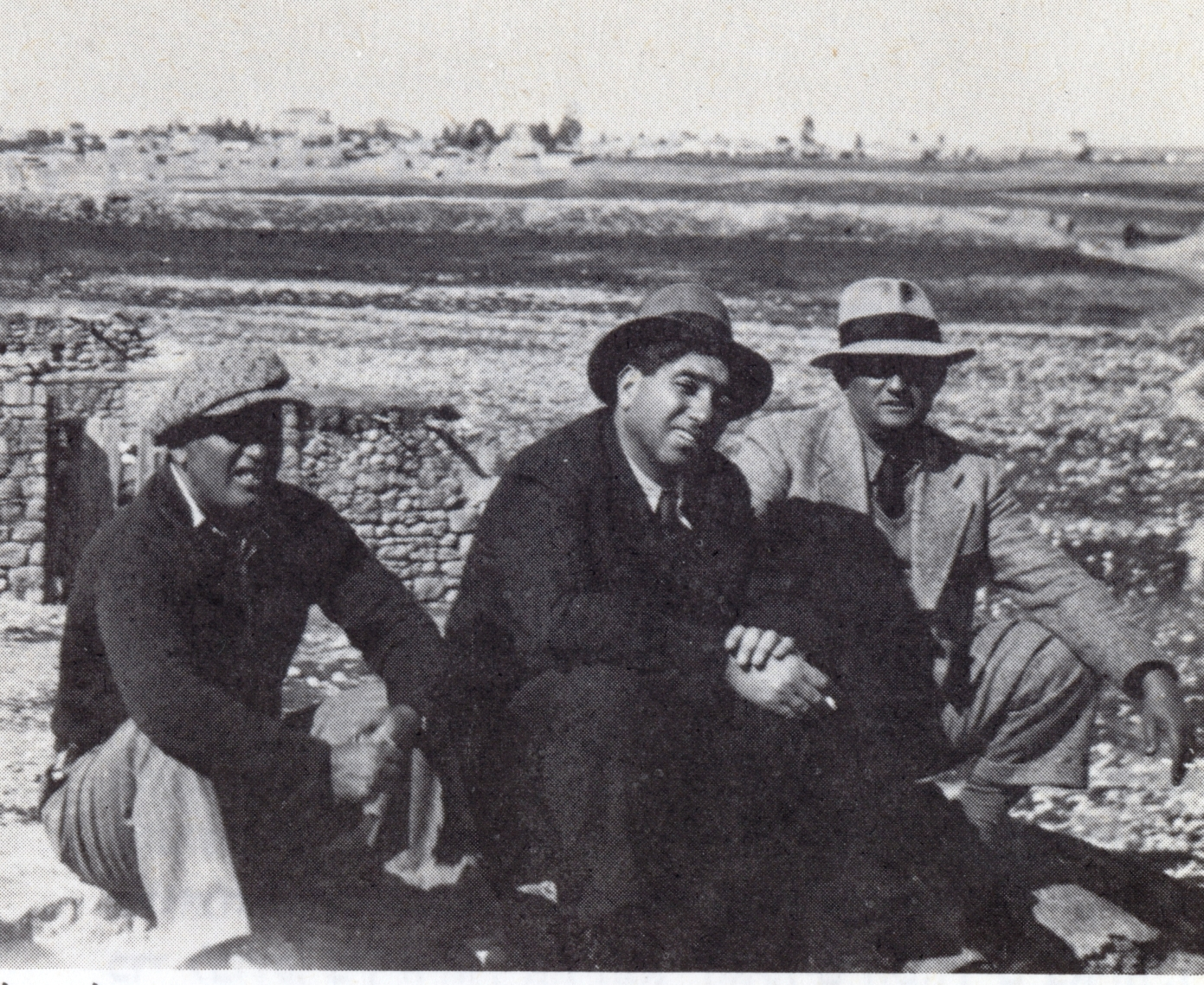
From right to left: Aminadav Altshuler, Ezra Danin and Yitzhak Arnon

Itzhak Arnon (Hebrew: יצחק ארנון; born Isaac Aharonowitz; 1909–2005) was an Israeli agronomist. Arnon was born in Antwerp (Belgium). He studied agronomy at Gembloux Agro-Bio Tech. In 1932, Itzhak Arnon immigrated to Palestine.

In 1933, he was appointed inspector of the Agricultural Experimental Station of the Mandatory Government in Acre. In 1948, he established the agricultural station at Neve Yaar.

In 1957, he obtained his PhD from the Hebrew University of Jerusalem. From 1958 to 1968, Itzhak Arnon headed the Volcani Institute of Agricultural Research. In 1971, he received the Israel Prize in agriculture. From 1971, he was a member of the Académie d'Agriculture.

== Selected publications ==
- Arnon, I. (1972). Crop production in dry regions. London: Leonard Hill.
