= Volcani Center =

Israeli research center

Agricultural Research Organization Volcani Institute
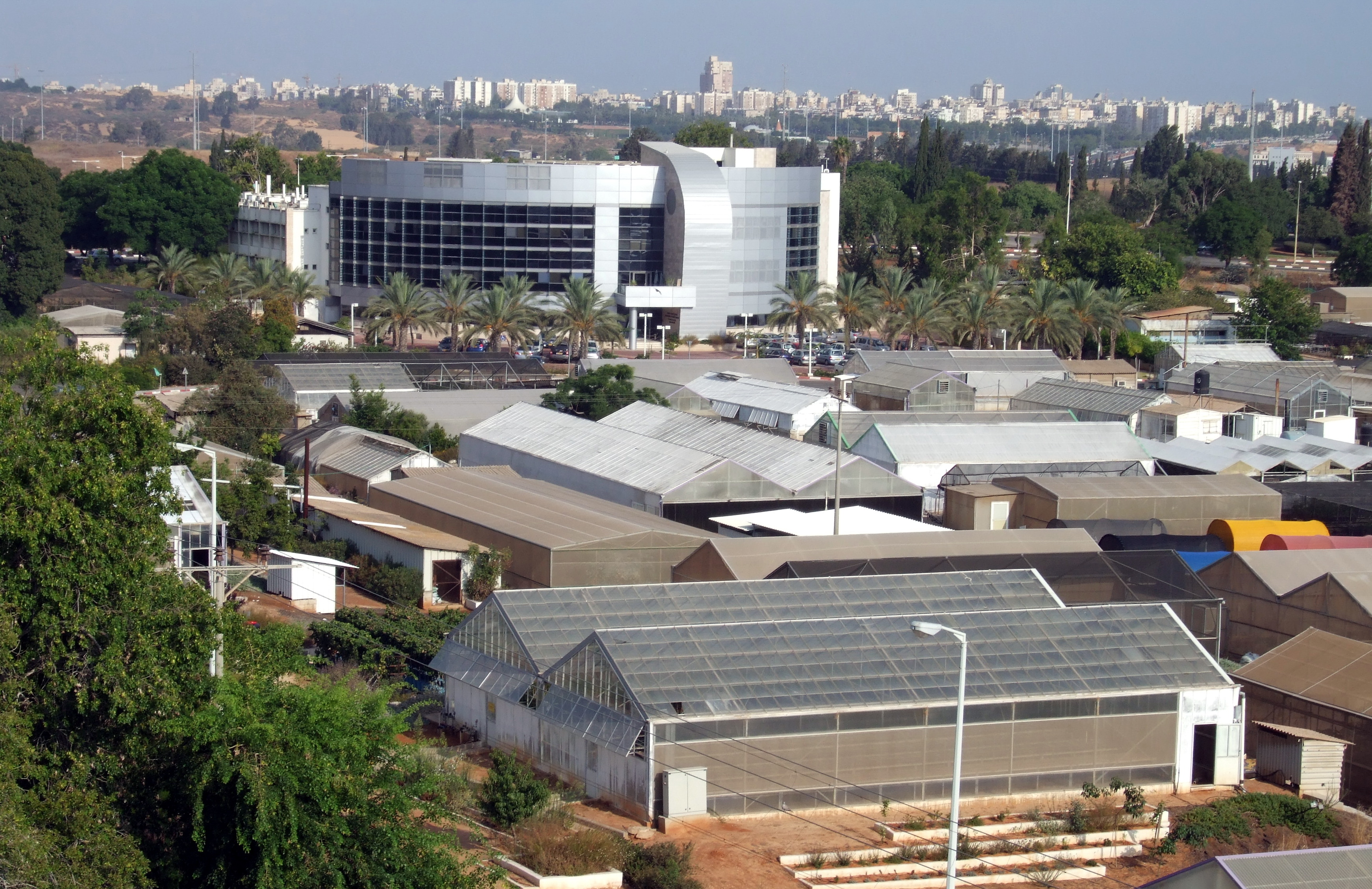
- Aerial view of part of the Volcani campus
- Other name: ARO
- Parent institution: Ministry of Agriculture and Rural Development
- Founder: Yitzhak Elazari Volcani
- Established: 1921
- Mission: Agricultural research and development
- Focus: Plant sciences; animal sciences; plant protection; soil, water and environmental sciences; postharvest and food sciences; agricultural engineering
- Subsidiaries: Kidum
- Owner: Government of Israel
- Formerly called: Agricultural Research Station of the Jewish Agency for Israel; Agricultural Research Station
- Address: Derekh Ha-Makkabim 68
- Location: Rishon LeZion campus; Newe Ya'ar campus; Gilat campus, Rishon LeZion, Israel
- Coordinates: 31°59′34″N 34°49′06″E
- Interactive map of Agricultural Research Organization; Volcani Institute
- Website: www.agri.gov.il/en/home

The Agricultural Research Organization, Volcani Institute (Hebrew: מנהל המחקר החקלאי - מכון וולקני), previously known as the Agricultural Research Station of the Jewish Agency for Israel, is an Israeli agricultural research center. It serves as the research arm of the Ministry of Agriculture and Rural Development of the State of Israel and provides research opportunities for local and international scientists at post-graduate levels, as well as educational opportunities for Israeli and international youths, farmers and scientists. The organization supports Israeli agriculture research, focusing on plant sciences, animal sciences, plant protection, soil and environmental sciences, food sciences, and agricultural engineering. The organization was founded in 1921 in Ben Shemen, Israel, by Yitzhak Elazari Volcani, for whom it is named.

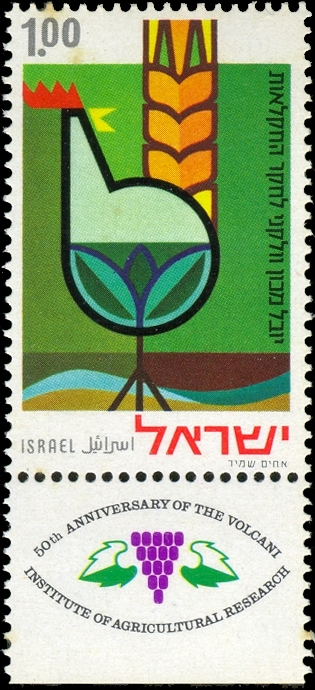
Israeli stamp celebrating the 50th anniversary of the Volcani Institute, 1971

== History ==
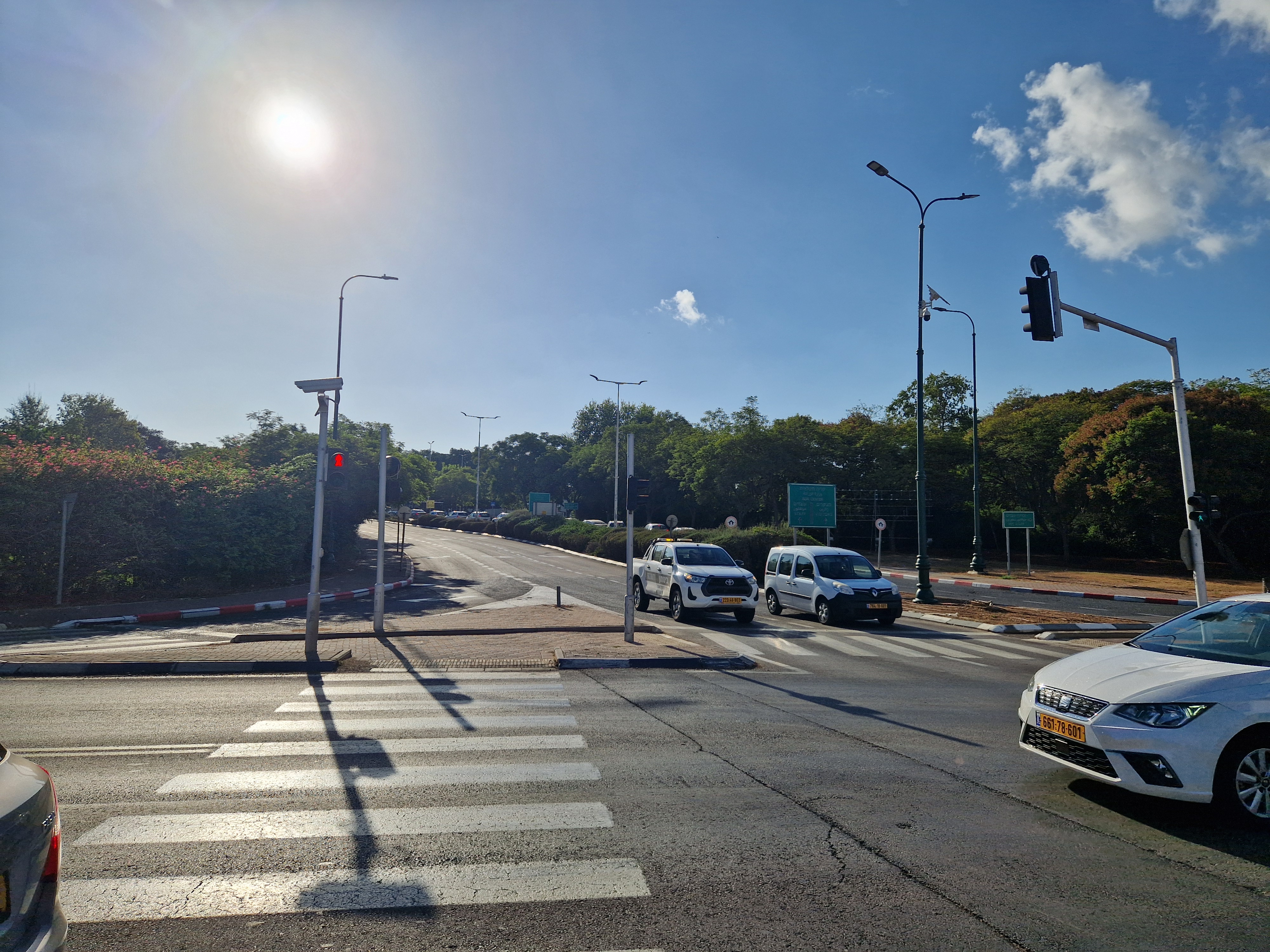
Entrance to the Volcani Center from Highway 412 in Rishon LeZion, 2024

During 1921, in the village of Ben Shemen, the Jewish Agency established the Agricultural Experiment Station under the leadership of Yitzhak Elazari Volcani. It was the first scientific institute in the British Mandate of Palestine. The station was established in response to a proposal by Chaim Weizmann and Arthur Ruppin, who recognized the need to advance agriculture in Israel. In 1932, the station was moved to Rehovot. In 1951, its control was transferred to the Israeli Ministry of Agriculture (Israel having been created in 1948), and the station was renamed the Agricultural Research Station (ARS). When Yitzhak Volcani died in 1951, after a directorship of thirty years, the organization was renamed the Volcani Institute in his honor. In the 1950s, the station was relocated to its present campus in Rishon LeZion, and in 1971, the ARS became part of the Agricultural Research Organization (ARO) under the auspices of the Ministry of Agriculture and Rural Development.

== Focus of research ==
Israel is a country with limited water resources. Its climate ranges from Mediterranean in the north to semi-arid and arid in the south. Due to these factors, research by the ARO has focused on:

- Agriculture under arid conditions and on marginal soils
- Irrigation using recycled wastewater and saline water
- Crop cultivation in protected environments
- Freshwater aquaculture under conditions of water shortage
- Minimization of produce losses through pest control and post-harvest storage methods
- Seed banking
- Breeding and development of new strains of crops and domestic animals better suited to adverse conditions

On July 24, 2017, UNESCO announced the ARO as one of the laureates of the UNESCO–Equatorial Guinea International Prize for Research in the Life Sciences for 2017, stating "The institute has successfully developed cutting-edge innovations and methodologies in agricultural research with practical applications as well as capacity building programmes to promote food security in arid, semi-arid and desert environments, advancing human well-being."

== Organization ==
The Agricultural Research Organization (ARO) has six institutes at three regional campuses (Rishon LeZion, Newe Ya'ar, and Gilat). The institutes include Plant Sciences, Animal Sciences, Plant Protection, Soil, Water, and Environmental Sciences, Postharvest and Food Sciences, and Agricultural Engineering. There is a seed laboratory for testing seed quality for local use and for export, and a plant gene bank to collect, preserve, and evaluate plant species indigenous to Israel, including landraces and primitive cultivars. Kidum, a unit of the ARO, manages the commercialization of the organization's intellectual property, technology transfer, and the establishment of partnerships, joint ventures, and business enterprises.

== Collaboration ==
The Agricultural Research Organization collaborates with other government-sponsored researchers, related industry bodies, educational institutions, farmers, and international organizations and scientists. The ARO's funding is from the Israeli government, farmers' organizations, and the private sector, as well as the US and the European Union. Investment is encouraged through the application of intellectual property rights. Private sector investment stems from companies in related industries, such as manufacturers of pesticides, fertilizers, seeds, plastics, irrigation equipment, and greenhouses.

== Education ==
The Agricultural Research Organization trains students in basic and applied agricultural research methodology and practice. Masters, doctoral, and post-doctoral students may complete their studies through the ARO's collaboration with universities, including The Hebrew University of Jerusalem; Bar-Ilan University; Ben Gurion University of the Negev; Technion – Israel Institute of Technology; Tel Aviv University; University of Haifa; and Ariel University. The ARO hosts visiting scientists and post-doctoral fellows from Israel and abroad. The organization has a post-doctoral fellowship program for up to 40 candidates from India and China.

In collaboration with Israel's Agency for International Development and Cooperation, research staff are involved in providing courses to scholars from developing countries, under the auspices of the Ministry of Foreign Affairs. The Volcani Institute also hosts courses for farmers from Gaza and the West Bank.

In 1973, a science-oriented youth unit was founded in cooperation with the Israel Ministry of Education. Junior and high school students may participate in activities including day-long study and enrichment sessions; special research projects and high school assignments in biology, agriculture, and the environmental sciences; science-oriented summer camps; and projects for the benefit of disadvantaged communities.

In 2006, the unit initiated a therapeutic agricultural project for the education and rehabilitation of youth at risk, The Organic Gardening and Marketing Program. The treatment program offers boys and girls an opportunity to study and work in organic gardening and marketing.

== Notable staff ==
=== Current ===
- Ellen Graber
- Shlomo Margel
- Efraim Lev

=== Past ===
- Shmuel Hurwitz
- Avraham Fahn (Head of Forestry Department)
- Itzhak Arnon (Head of the Institute)
- Eli Putievsky
- Shimon Mazeh
- Margalith Galun
- Zdenka Samish (Head of Food Technology Department)
- Chanan Oppenheimer (Head of Subtropical Fruit Trees Department)

== See also ==
- Agricultural research in Israel
- Kibbutz
- Science and technology in Israel
- Benjamin Elazari Volcani
