= Jonathan Gressel =

Israeli scientist and professor (born 1936)

Jonathan Ben Gressel
- יונתן גרסל
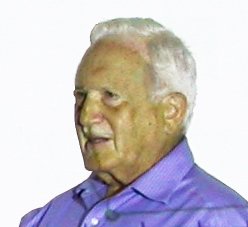
- Born: October 30, 1936; Cleveland, Ohio
- Education: University of Wisconsin–Madison
- Scientific career
- Fields: Plant geneticist, Agricultural science
- Workplaces: Weizmann Institute of Science

External videos
- "Pr. Jonathan Gressel, Weizmann Institute of Science (Israel)"

Jonathan Gressel (Hebrew: יונתן גרסל; born October 30, 1936, in Cleveland, Ohio) is an Israeli agricultural scientist and Professor Emeritus at the Weizmann Institute of Science in Rehovot, Israel. Gressel is a "strong proponent of using modern genetic techniques to improve agriculture" especially in third world and developing countries such as Africa. In 2010, Gressel received Israel's highest civilian award, the Israel Prize, for his work in agriculture.

== Early life ==
Jonathan Ben Gressel were born on October 30, 1936, in Cleveland, Ohio, US, and immigrated to Israel with his family, making aliyah in 1950 at the age of 14.

== Education ==
Gressel completed his secondary education at Pardes Hanna Agricultural High School in Israel in 1955. He returned to the United States, where he earned his B.Sc. in Plant Sciences at Ohio State University. He then attended the University of Wisconsin where he obtained his master's degree in Botany (Plant Physiology) in 1957, working with Folke K. Skoog, and his Ph.D. degree in 1962 working with LeRoy G. Holm, Eldon H. Newcomb, and R. H. Burris.

== Career ==
Gressel joined the Weizmann Institute of Science in Rehovot, Israel, in 1962, working in the biochemistry department. In 1963 he moved to the Plant Genetics Department (later the Department of Plant and Environmental Science.) For a number of years, he held the Gilbert de Botton Chair of Plant Sciences. As of 2005, he became a professor emeritus at the Weizmann Institute.

Gressel has edited several journals, including Plant Science and others in this field. He has taught classes on transgenic biosafety for the United Nations Industrial Development Organization (UNIDO).

Gressel belongs to the American Society of Plant Biologists, the International Weed Science Society, and Sigma Xi. He is an Honorary member of the Weed Science Society of America. He served as president of the International Weed Science Society from 1997 to 1999.

In 2008 Jonathan Gressel co-founded the company TransAlgae.

== Research ==
Two-thirds of the food eaten by the human population comes from just four main plant species: wheat, rice, maize, and soybeans. Historically, reliance on genetically uniform crops has put the human population at risk for catastrophic crop failures such as the European Potato Failure and the Great Famine of Ireland. Throughout the twentieth century, plant breeding has focused on increasing agricultural productivity, while pesticides and herbicides have been widely used to increase yields. Concerns have arisen about reliance on chemical means of weed control, and the ability of pests and weeds to develop resistance to pesticides and herbicides.

Jonathan Gressel and Lee Segel developed the first simulation model for the development of resistance to herbicides, later modifying and expanding it. Their models have been widely used to predict and study the possible evolution of herbicide resistance. In 1982, Gressel and Homer LeBaron edited the first book to be published on Herbicide Resistance in Plants.

Gressel and Segel's earliest models are relatively simple, and tend to predict pessimistic outcomes for the evolution and management of resistance. Their later models are more complex and suggest a variety of options for managing herbicide resistance. In 1991, Gressel reported a number of characteristics that tend to be associated with plants that develop herbicide resistance: 1) Herbaceous annuals 2) Self-fertile 3) Found in agricultural habitats 4) Colonisers 5) High reproductive capacity 6) Complex genetic variability (polymorphic phenotypes)

Assuming that a heritable variation of a trait occurs in a population, the rate at which it evolves will depend on the mode of inheritance of the traits, and intensity of selection in the population. The rate at which naturally resistant individuals occur in a population varies with plant species. Persistent applications of herbicides can result in recurrent selection, resulting in a shift in the average fitness in the population due to herbicide exposure. Resistant individuals in a population will produce seed for the next generation, while non-resistant individuals do not live to do so. Selection pressure will drive the proportion of resistant individuals in the next generation upward. The rate at which herbicide resistance appears in a weed population will depend on factors such as the initial frequency of resistant individuals, how many individuals in a population are treated, the mode of inheritance of the gene or genes involved, and the nature and extent of herbicide use.

Gressel has extensively studied weed control practices, with particular attention to developing countries where farmers may not have the resources to buy and use expensive herbicides. Herbicide rotation is one type of management practice that may slow the evolution of herbicide-resistant plants. In Molecular biology of weed control (2002) Gressel also reviews possible approaches such as the development of plant species that can produce their own weed-killing allelochemicals and the development of insects and plant pathogens that can act as biological control agents by targeting herbicide-resistant weeds.

In recent years, Gressel has focused on control options for the root parasitic weedsOrobanche (broomrape) and Striga (witchweed). These weeds are particularly important in the Middle East and sub-Saharan Africa, where they can cause farmers to lose half their potential yield and cause long-term environmental damage. Gressel has developed herbicide-resistant maize seeds coated in pesticide, which are now commercially available in Kenya and Uganda.

Gressel is also known for inventing the biobarcode. He has proposed the creation of a universal public repository to track 'biobarcoded' biological materials. PCR (polymerase chain reaction) based techniques would be used to create, assign and identify nucleotide sequences that can be recognized by universal primers. There are a variety of reasons to use biobarcodes, including protection of patented organisms, detection of transgenics, and tracking of the dispersal of genetic materials. Gressel suggests that such a system would have benefits to industry, regulators and taxpayers.

Another area of Gressels's research concerns the evolution of volunteers (plants that germinate in later years, after a crop has been harvested) and feral plants (derived from crops that have become de-domesticated). Understanding processes in the domestication and de-domestication of crops is particularly important as scientists develop and commercialize transgenic crops. In 2005, Gressel edited Crop ferality and volunteerism, the first book published on the topic.

In 2008, Gressel published Genetic Glass Ceilings: Transgenics for Crop Biodiversity, a careful, detailed, and passionate examination of the possible application of plant sciences such as molecular biology and transgenics to worldwide agricultural policies. He discusses the limitations and possible genetic modification of fourteen underutilised crops. He describes ways in which plant sciences could be used to expand biodiversity, address agricultural problems, and protect the environment.

"While these crop-specific chapters abundantly display Gressel's vast knowledge of genetics, molecular biology, agronomy, and plant breeding, his approach engages the reader with the style of a mystery novel. Each presents a set of genetic puzzles, or surprising and unexpected molecular events, which in the end are deftly resolved with an insight worthy of Sherlock Holmes. Although his chapters are dense with scientific knowledge and the scientific method, they are nonetheless riveting for those who can feel the excitement of scientific exploration and the joy of discovery."

In 2008 Jonathan Gressel co-founded TransAlgae, with his son, Noam Gressel and others. His goal was to develop genetically modified algae for growth in customized indoor and outdoor reactors that would be resistant to colonization and take-over by other types of algae and bacteria. The genetically designed algae, along with its optimal medium and growing system, could be specialized for a particular partner. To address limitations in water availability, the systems are designed to work with either fresh water or sea water. In the event of an accidental release, the algae were designed to die within a few hours, to prevent their escape into the wild. Possible applications of specialized algae include feedstocks for biofuels, animal feed, and drug delivery. Gressel has applied for or received at least 21 patents.

On 8 September 2016, Gressel delivered a lecture entitled "Hammering two new nails in Malthus’s coffin with genetic engineering" to Manchester Literary & Philosophical Society where notes of it may be viewed

== Awards ==
- 2010, Gressel received Israel's highest civilian award, the Israel Prize in the category of Agriculture for "breakthrough studies in the molecular mechanisms that allow the extermination of weeds in agriculture."
- 2008, Outstanding International Achievement award, International Weed Science Society
- 2007, Honorary Award, Weed Science Society of Israel
- 1992, Honorary Fellow, Weed Science Society of America
- 1979, Cohen Award in Plant Protection, Israel Agricultural Research Organization, for work on cellular and mathematical models for studying herbicide effects (with Dr. S. Zilkah)
- 1967, Sarah Leedy Award for Outstanding Young Scientist, Weizmann Institute of Science

== Publications ==
Gressel has published more than 300 peer reviewed journal articles and book chapters, and eight books. His Herbicide resistance in plants (1982) and Crop ferality and volunteerism (2005) are the first books on those topics.

=== Books ===
- LeBaron, Homer M.; Gressel, Jonathan (1982). Herbicide resistance in plants. New York u.a.: Wiley. ISBN 978-0-471-08701-4.
- Gressel, Jonathan (2002). Molecular biology of weed control. London [u.a.]: Taylor & Francis. ISBN 978-0-415-26642-0.
- Gressel, Jonathan, ed. (2005). Crop ferality and volunteerism: [Workshop on "Crop Ferality and Volunteerism: a Threat to Food Security in the Transgenic Era?" ... in Bellagio, Italy on May 24 - 28, 2004]. Boca Raton, Fla. [u.a.]: Taylor & Francis. ISBN 978-0-8493-2895-4.
- Ejeta, Gebisa; Gressel, Jonathan, eds. (2007). Integrating new technologies for striga control: towards ending the witch-hunt ([Online-Ausg.]. ed.). Singapore: World Scientific. ISBN 978-981-270-708-6.
- Gressel, Jonathan (2008). Genetic glass ceilings: transgenics for crop biodiversity. Baltimore: Johns Hopkins University Press. ISBN 978-0-8018-8719-2.
- Joel, Daniel M.; Gressel, Jonathan; Musselman, Lytton, eds. (2013). Parasitic Orobanchaceae: Parasitic Mechanisms and Control Strategies. Berlin: Springer. ISBN 978-3-642-38145-4.

=== Papers ===
- Gressel, Jonathan (May 2009). "Crops with target-site herbicide resistance for Orobanche and Striga control". Pest Management Science. 65 (5): 560–565. doi:10.1002/ps.1738. PMID 19280593.
- Gressel, Jonathan; Valverde, Bernal E (July 2009). "A strategy to provide long-term control of weedy rice while mitigating herbicide resistance transgene flow, and its potential use for other crops with related weeds". Pest Management Science. 65 (7): 723–731. doi:10.1002/ps.1754. PMID 19367567.
- Gressel, Jonathan (November 2010). "Needs for and environmental risks from transgenic crops in the developing world". New Biotechnology. 27 (5): 522–527. doi:10.1016/j.nbt.2010.05.015. PMID 20685306.
- Gressel, Jonathan (March 2015). "Are integrated pest management (IPM) and resistance management synonymous or antagonistic?". Pest Management Science. 71 (3): 329–330. doi:10.1002/ps.3945. PMID 25677101.
