= Benjamin Elazari Volcani =

Israeli microbiologist

- בנימין אלעזרי-וולקני
- Elazari Volcani in 1971
- Born: January 4, 1915; Ben Shemen, Ottoman Empire (modern-day Israel)
- Died: February 1, 1999 (aged 84); La Jolla, California, U.S.
- Education: Hebrew University of Jerusalem
- Occupation: Microbiologist
- Notable work: Hopkins Marine Station; Scripps Institution of Oceanography; University of California, San Diego
- Spouse: Eleanor Susan Brownell Anthony "Toni" Solomons
- Children: Yanon Volcani
- Parent(s): Yitzhak Elazari Volcani; Sarah Krieger

Benjamin Elazari Volcani (Hebrew: בנימין אלעזרי-וולקני; born 4 January 1915, died 1 February 1999) was an Israeli microbiologist who discovered life in the Dead Sea and pioneered biological silicon research at Scripps Institution of Oceanography at the University of California, San Diego.

== Biography ==
Volcani was born January 4, 1915, in Ben Shemen, in what was then the Ottoman Empire the son of Yitzhak Elazari Volcani (1880–1955) and Sarah Krieger. He had two sisters, Ruth and Zafrira. His father, as a young Zionist in Lithuania, had studied agricultural economics, and agronomy before immigrating to Palestine in 1908, where he became a world leader in these fields. Yitzhak Elazari Volcani is considered the founder of modern agriculture in Israel. The Volcani Institute of Agricultural Research is named for his father, as is Beit Elazari, a moshav in central Israel.

As a teenager Benjamin Volcani wanted to become an actor, but as an undergraduate became interested in biology. He received his Master of Science degree in microbiology from Hebrew University of Jerusalem in 1936. That same year, he found that the Dead Sea, so called because it was thought to be too salty to sustain life, in fact supports several types of microorganisms now classified as halophilic archaea. Both his M.Sc. degree (1936) and Ph.D. (1940) were from the Hebrew University, Jerusalem. His Ph.D. thesis was the first ever written in Hebrew (“Studies of the Microflora of the Dead Sea”).

His discovery of microorganisms in the Dead Sea was the focal point of his work from 1936 to 1945 and was the theme of his doctoral thesis. From 1939 to 1958 Volcani served on the staff of the Weizmann Institute of Science in Rehovot, and in 1948 he was appointed head of the institute's Section of Microbiology. During the 1940s, he also spent time in the United States as a research fellow at the University of California, Berkeley; Hopkins Marine Station of Stanford University; the California Institute of Technology; and the University of Wisconsin.

In March 1948, Volcani married Eleanor Susan Brownell Anthony "Toni" Solomons Jackson, the daughter of Theodore Solomons, in New York City. (Note: She was the daughter of Theodore Seixas Solomons (1870–1947) an explorer and early member of the Sierra Club and who helped discover and define the John Muir Trail; and Katherine Gray Church, the only daughter of Henry Seymour Church and Margaretta Josephine Gray.) (Note: An unusually gifted student, Toni scored so high on intelligence tests that she was selected for a lifelong research project known as the Terman Genetic Studies of Genius. The study was started by Lewis Terman at Stanford University. After marrying and divorcing Benjamin O. Jackson, she began a relationship with Ed Ricketts in 1940 and became his common-law wife. Toni, who had attended the University of California, Los Angeles, later worked as a personal assistant for Pulitzer Prize–winning writer John Steinbeck and was the editor of The Log from the Sea of Cortez. Beside Steinbeck, their circle of friends also included the writer and painter, Henry Miller and the mythologist, writer, and lecturer Joseph Campbell. She left Ricketts after the death of her daughter (by her first husband) Katherine Adele Jackson. Katherine died on October 5, 1947 at the age of 12 of a brain tumor and only five months after the death of her father.) After their marriage, the couple settled in Israel. Volcani smuggled in a small field-radar unit in his baggage. His wife remembers walking to the market in Rehovot, about one mile (1.6 km) from their house, and diving into foxholes along the road when pairs of small two-seater Arab planes came over on bombing runs. They came in low, each dropping its 25 lb (11 kg) bomb as it flew off. The first bomb of the war fell on the street in front of the Volcani's house. Volcani and his wife had one child, Yanon Volcani, born in Israel in January 1949. Yanon is a clinical psychologist practicing in San Diego, California.

Volcani died on February 6, 1999, in La Jolla, California.

== Scientific career ==
In 1939, Volcani became a member of the Sieff Institute in Rehovot, later renamed the Weizmann Institute of Science. He headed its laboratory of microbiology until 1959, when he joined the faculty at Scripps Institution of Oceanography. He decided to focus on diatoms, one of the very few organisms that use silicon rather than calcium for their skeletal structures. Silicon is one of the most abundant elements on earth, and in 1959 no one was working on its metabolism. The biology of silicon had been shunned by all biochemists, the dogma being that it was inert. Volcani realized that diatoms, whose life cycle is based on silicon, provided an ideal experimental canvas. From 1959 onward, his lab made multifaceted discoveries centered on biologically active silicon in marine diatoms. The lab became a focal point for the study of silicon metabolism and biomineralization at the molecular level, embracing experimental techniques, from elegant electron microscopy of diatom shells to gene cloning and the expression of silicon transporting proteins in frog eggs.

He invented ways to synchronize the cell division cycle of diatoms. He showed that silicon activates the gene coding for the polymerase enzyme that copies diatom DNA. He was also interested in the toxic and pathological effects of polysilicates, such as talc and asbestos, on mammalian cells in tissue culture, and was the first to do tissue culture at Scripps. He spent a one-year sabbatical at the University of Swansea studying the effects of polysilicates on mammalian cells, and published papers on the uptake of silicic acid by rat liver mitochondria.

His studies of silicon metabolism often involved growing diatoms of various species in different concentrations of silicon and then studying the effect on specific metabolic pathways. These experiments studied pigments, lipids, amino acids, cell wall synthesis, DNA synthesis, ribosomes, sodium-potassium membrane pumps, cell membrane characterization, glycolate metabolism, cyclic nucleotide metabolism, protein kinases, and a catalog of genes that were turned on by silicon. Several papers centered on the effects of silicon on photorespiration in diatoms.

He published over 100 papers related to silicon metabolism and co-edited Silicon and Siliceous Structures in Biological Systems (Springer, 1981). He received continuing grants from the National Institutes of Health for 32 years. He trained many doctoral students and had a constant stream of postdoctoral associates and visitors passing through the lab until his retirement in 1985.
