= Yitzhak Elazari Volcani =

Israeli writer, agronomist and botanist (1880–1955)

- יצחק אלעזרי וולקני
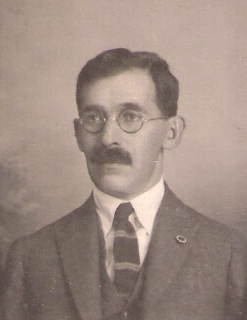
- Yitzhak Volcani in 1923
- Born: January 28, 1880; Eišiškės, Vilna Governorate, Russian Empire
- Died: May 24, 1955 (aged 75); Rehovot, Israel
- Burial place: Nahalal Cemetery

Yitzhak Elazari Volcani (Hebrew: יצחק אביגדור אלעזרי-וולקני; January 28, 1880 - May 24, 1955) was a writer, agronomist and botanist, pioneer of agricultural research in Israel and the founder of Volcani Center of Agricultural Research.

Born as Yitzchak-Avigdor Wilkansky in Eišiškės, Russian Empire (now in Lithuania), Elazari-Volcani got a degree in Agronomy from the University of Königsberg and made aliyah to Eretz Israel in 1908. There, he worked as a director of experimental farm in Ben Shemen and Huldah, where he lived from 1914, and was a member of Zionist organization Hapoel Hatzair. He founded the first agricultural research station in Israel, that later became a faculty of the Hebrew University. As a member of Hapoel Hatzair, Volcani was a proponent of moshav rather that kibbutz, believing in a "personal freedom of creation" as opposed by more collectivist kibbutz movement. Volcani was a member of Executive Committee of the Zionist Organization in Palestine, and advisor of the World Zionist Organization.

He wrote several plays and articles in Hebrew under pseudonyms Ben Avuya and A. Zioni.

His brother, Meir Wilkansky (1882–1949), was a Hebrew writer and translator. His son, Benjamin Elazari Volcani, was a biologist who found life in the Dead Sea; his daughter, Zafrira Volcani (1910-1988), was a microbiologist.

== Gallery ==
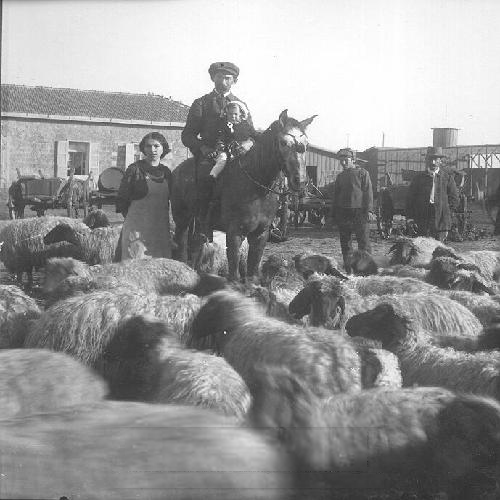
Yitzhak Volcani with his daughter Tzafira and wife Sara in Ben Shemen, 1912

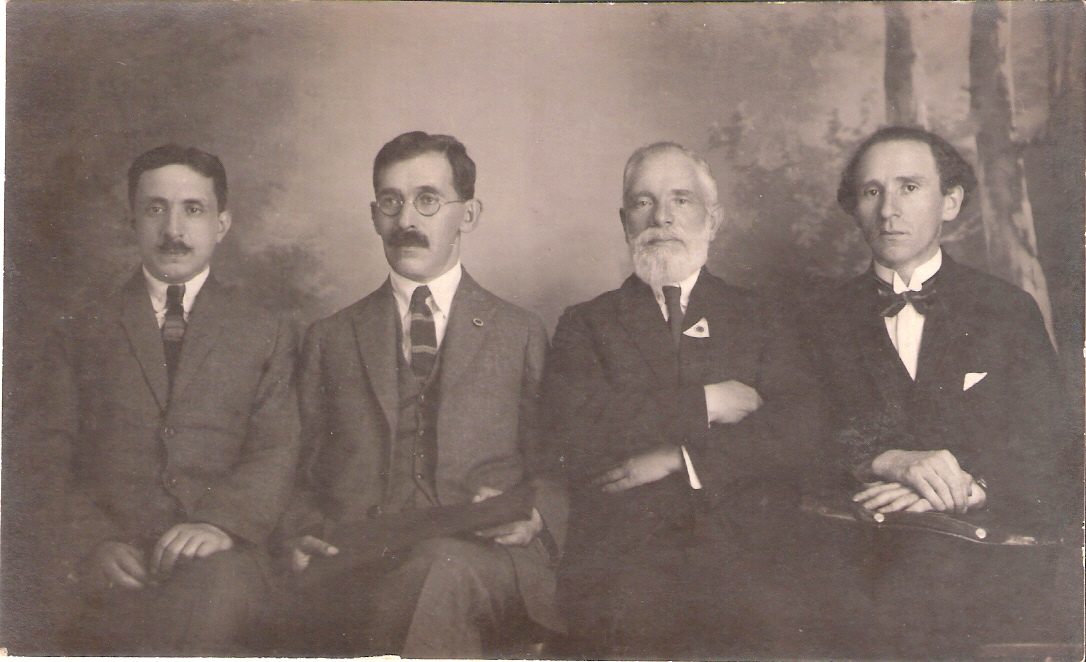
Yehoshua Fridman, Yitzchak Vilkanski and Eliezer Eliyahu Fridman in the 13th Zionist Congress in 1923

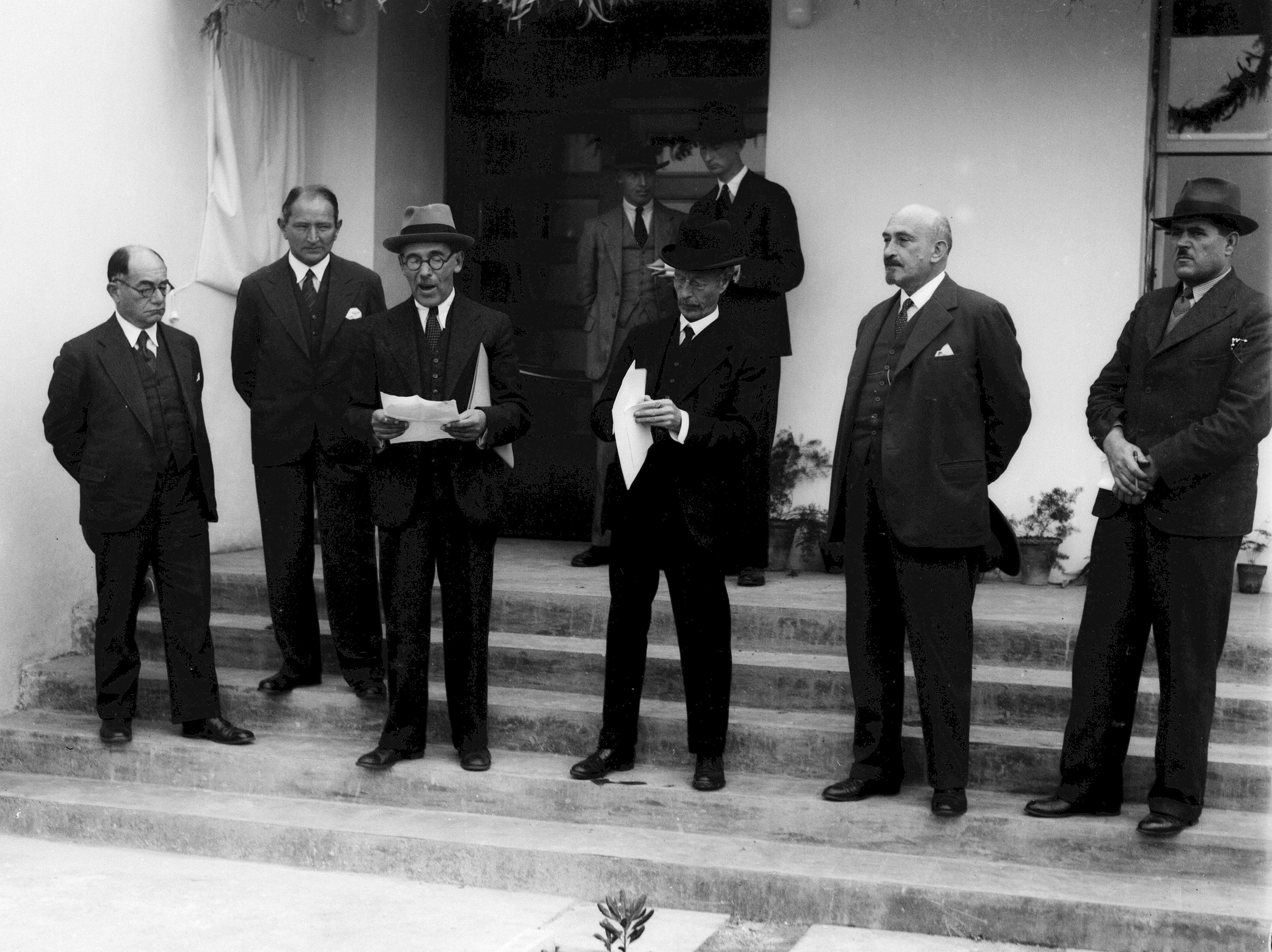
Dedication ceremony of soil research center in Rehovot. From left to right: Arthur Ruppin, Itzhak Magazinik, Yitzhak Elazari Volkani, Wauchope, Chaim Weizmann, Kuperman. 1935

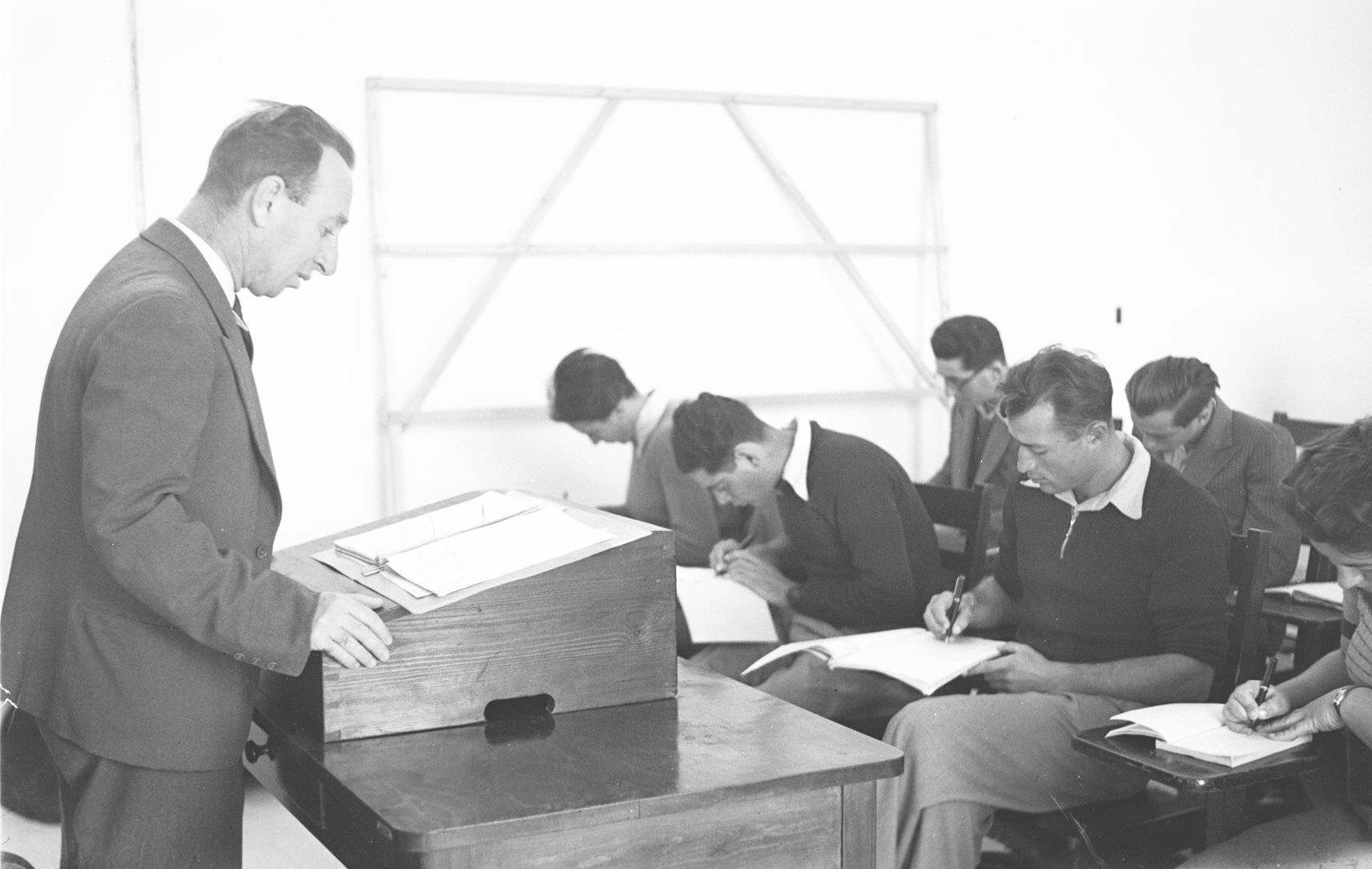
Professor Volcani at the Institute of Agriculture, Rehovot, 1942
