= List of Israel Prize recipients =

This is an incomplete list of recipients of the Israel Prize from the inception of the Prize in 1953 - 2025.

== List ==
For each year, the recipients are, in most instances, listed in the order in which they appear on the official Israel Prize website.

Note: The table can be sorted chronologically (default), alphabetically or by field utilizing the icon.

Year	Name	Field	Comments
1953	Gedaliah Alon	Jewish studies	Posthumously awarded prize, three years after his death. First recipient of the prize for Jewish studies.
1953	Haim Hazaz	Literature	One of first two recipients of the prize for Literature.
1953	Ya'akov Cohen	Literature	Also awarded the Israel Prize in 1958. One of first two recipients of the prize for Literature.
1953	Dina Feitelson-Schur	Education	First female recipient of the Israel Prize. First recipient of the prize for Education.
1953	Mark Dvorzhetski	Social science	First recipient of the prize for Social science.
1953	Lipman Heilprin	Medical science	First recipient of the prize for medicine or Medical science.
1953	Zeev Ben-Zvi	Sculpture	First recipient of the prize for any of the fine arts.
1953	Shimshon Amitsur	Exact sciences	One of the first two recipients of the prize for Exact sciences.
1953	Jacob Levitzki	Exact sciences	Family relationship: Father of recipient Alexander Levitzki (1990, Life sciences). One of the first two recipients of the prize for Exact sciences.
1954	Moshe Zvi Segal	Jewish studies	First rabbi to receive the Israel Prize.
1954	Schmuel Hugo Bergmann	Humanities	Also awarded the Israel Prize in 1974. First recipient of the prize for the Humanities.
1954	David Shimoni	Literature	
1954	Shmuel Yosef Agnon	Literature	Also awarded the Israel Prize in 1958.
1954	Arthur Biram	Education	
1954	Gad Tedeschi	Jurisprudence	First recipient of the prize for Jurisprudence or law.
1954	Franz Ollendorff	Exact sciences	
1954	Michael Zohary	Life sciences	First recipient of the prize for Life sciences.
1954	Shimon Fritz Bodenheimer	Agriculture	First recipient of the prize for Agriculture.
1954	Ödön Pártos	Music	First recipient of the prize for Music.
1955	Ephraim Urbach	Jewish studies	
1955	Isaac Heinemann	Jewish studies	
1955	Zalman Shneur	Literature	
1955	Yitzhak Lamdan	Literature	
1955	Michael Fekete	Exact sciences	
1955	Israel Reichert	Life sciences	
1955	Yaakov Ben-Tor	Life sciences	
1955	Akiva Vroman	Life sciences	
1955	Benjamin Shapira	Medical science	
1955	Sara Hestrin-Lerner	Medical science	Family relationship: Sister of recipient Shlomo Hestrin (1957, Exact sciences).
1955	Netanel Hochberg	Agriculture	
1955	Zahara Schatz	Painting and Sculpture	
1956	Naftali Herz Tur-Sinai	Jewish studies	
1956	Yigael Yadin	Jewish studies	
1956	Yehezkel Abramsky	Rabbinical literature	First recipient of the prize for specifically Rabbinical literature.
1956	Gershon Shufman	Literature	
1956	Miriam Yalan-Shteklis	Children's literature	First recipient of the prize specifically for Children's literature.
1956	Nechama Leibowitz	Education	
1956	Yaakov Talmon	Social sciences	
1956	Avraham HaLevi Frankel	Exact sciences	
1956	Manfred Aschner	Life sciences	
1956	Haim Ernst Wertheimer	Medicine	
1956	Hanna Rovina	Theatre	First recipient of the prize for the Theatre, acting or Stage arts.
1957	Haim Shirman	Jewish studies	
1957	Yohanan Levi	Humanities	Posthumously awarded Prize.
1957	Yaakov Fichman	Literature	
1957	Uri Zvi Grinberg	Literature	
1957	Paltiel Daykan	Jurisprudence	
1957	Siegfried Lehman	Education	
1957	Shlomo Hestrin	Exact sciences	Family relationship: Brother of recipient Sara Hestrin-Lerner (1955, Medical science).
1957	David Feingold	Exact sciences	
1957	Gad Avigad	Exact sciences	
1957	Saul Adler	Medicine	
1957	Shmuel Horowitz	Agriculture	
1957	Paul Ben-Haim	Music	
1957	Reuvein Margolies	Rabbinical literature	
1957	Eliezer Smoli	Children's literature	
1957	Dov Karmi	Architecture	Family relationships: Father of recipients Ram Karmi (2002, Architecture) and Ada Karmi-Melamede (2007, Architecture). First recipient of the prize for Architecture.
1958	Yosef Klausner	Jewish studies	
1958	Ben-Zion Dinur	Jewish studies	Also awarded the Israel Prize in 1973.
1958	Gershom Scholem	Jewish studies	
1958	Yehezkel Kaufmann	Jewish studies	
1958	Yitzhak Baer	Jewish studies	
1958	Isaac HaLevi Herzog	Rabbinical literature	
1958	Yehuda Leib Maimon	Rabbinical literature	
1958	Yosef Zvi HaLevy	Rabbinical literature	Family relationship: Grandfather of recipient Abraham Haim Halevy (2002, Agriculture).
1958	Martin Buber	Humanities	
1958	Shmuel Yosef Agnon	Literature	Also awarded the Israel Prize in 1954.
1958	Isaac Dov Berkowitz	Literature	
1958	Ya'akov Cohen	Literature	Also awarded the Israel Prize in 1953.
1958	Youth Aliyah	Education	Organization – one of the first four organizations to receive the Prize.
1958	Rachel Katznelson-Shazar	Social sciences	
1958	Yoel (Giulio) Racah	Exact sciences	
1958	Marcus Reiner	Exact sciences	
1958	Leo Picard	Life sciences	
1958	Bernhard Zondek	Medicine	
1958	Selig Suskin	Agriculture	
1958	Bezalel Academy of Art and Design	Painting and Sculpture	Organization – one of the first four organizations to receive the Prize.
1958	Habima Theatre	Theatre	Organization – one of the first four organizations to receive the Prize.
1958	Israel Philharmonic Orchestra	Music	Organization – one of the first four organizations to receive the Prize.
1959	Shlomo Yosef Zevin	Rabbinical literature	
1959	Leo Aryeh Mayer	Humanities	
1959	S. Yizhar (Yizhar Smilansky)	Literature	
1959	Ezra Fleischer	Literature	
1959	Ephraim Katchalski (Ephraim Katzir)	Life sciences	Family relationship: Brother of recipient Aharon Katzir (1961, Life sciences).
1959	Michael Sela	Life sciences	
1959	Hillel (Heinz) Oppenheimer	Agriculture	
1959	Joseph Zaritsky	Painting	
1959	Yehoshua Bertonov	Theatre	Family relationship: Father of recipient Devorah Bertonov (1991, Stage arts).
1960	Abraham Haim Shalit	Jewish studies	
1960	Avraham Arnon	Education	
1960	Shabtai Rosenne	Jurisprudence	
1960	Aharon Meskin	Theatre	
1960	Isaac Michaelson	Medicine	
1960	Franz Sondheimer	Exact sciences	
1961	Shlomo Goren	Rabbinical literature	
1961	Yechezkel Kutscher	Humanities	
1961	Yehuda Burla	Literature	
1961	Aharon Katzir	Life sciences	Family relationship: Brother of recipient Ephraim Katzir (1959, Life sciences).
1961	Ora Kedem	Life sciences	
1961	Jacob van der Hoeden	Agriculture	
1961	Menachem Avidom	Music	
1962	Hanoch Yelon	Jewish studies	
1962	Joseph Bentwich	Education	
1962	Yitzhak Kanav	Social sciences	
1962	Ze'ev Lev	Exact sciences	
1962	Zvi Sliternik	Medicine	
1962	Arieh Sharon	Architecture	
1963	Menachem Mendel Kasher	Rabbinical literature	
1963	Nathan Rotenstreich	Humanities	
1963	Eliezer Steinman	Literature	
1963	Avraham Fahn	Life sciences	
1963	Mordechai Ardon	Painting	
1964	Ze'ev Ben-Haim	Jewish studies	
1964	Moshe Zilberg	Jurisprudence	
1964	Moshe Rachmilewitz	Medicine	
1964	Meir Margalit	Theatre	
1965	Shlomo Zemach	Literature	
1965	Shlomo Dykman	Literature	
1965	Karl Frankenstein	Education	
1965	Israel Defense Forces	Education	Organization – the only organization to receive the Prize during the 1960s.
1965	Judith Shuval	Social sciences	
1965	Amos de-Shalit	Exact sciences	
1965	Igal Talmi	Exact sciences	
1965	Shmuel Stoller	Agriculture	
1965	Mordechai Seter	Music	
1966	Shlomo Morag	Jewish studies	
1966	Yitzhak Arieli	Rabbinical literature	
1966	Hans Jakob Polotsky	Humanities	
1966	Moshe Rudolf Bloch	Life sciences	
1966	Alfred Mansfeld	Architecture	
1966	Dora Gad	Architecture	
1967	Avraham Shlonsky	Literature	
1967	Ernst Simon	Education	
1967	Benjamin Akzin	Jurisprudence	
1967	Aryeh Leo Olitzki	Medicine	
1967	Marcel Janco	Painting	
1968	Ovadia Hedaya	Rabbinical literature	
1968	Moshe Yechiel Epstein	Rabbinical literature	
1968	Shmuel Yeivin	Jewish studies	
1968	Benjamin Mazar	Jewish studies	
1968	Dov Sadan	Jewish studies	
1968	Shmuel Sambursky	Humanities	
1968	Shlomo Pines	Humanities	
1968	Avigdor Hameiri	Literature	
1968	Natan Alterman	Literature	
1968	Yaakov Berman	Education	
1968	Alexander M. Dushkin	Education	
1968	Shoshana Persitz	Education	
1968	David Horowitz	Social sciences	
1968	Shimon Agranat	Jurisprudence	
1968	Emanuel Goldberg	Exact sciences	
1968	Ernst David Bergmann	Life sciences	
1968	Chaim Sheba	Medicine	
1968	Chanan Oppenheimer	Agriculture	
1968	Yitzhak Danziger	Sculpture	
1968	Yosef Milo	Theatre	
1968	Gertrud Kraus	Dance	First recipient of the prize specifically for dance.
1968	Benjamin Idelson	Architecture	
1969	Yosef Qafih (Kapach)	Jewish studies	Family relationship: Husband of recipient Bracha Qafih (1999, Special contribution to Society and the State). The first husband and wife to have both received the Israel Prize (followed by Elihu Katz [1989] and Ruth Katz [2012]).
1969	Joshua Prawer	Humanities	
1969	Schneor Lipson	Life sciences	
1969	Shimon Finkel	Theatre	
1969	Yuval Ne'eman	Exact sciences	Returned the Prize in 1992.
1970	Ovadia Yosef	Rabbinical literature	
1970	Abba Kovner	Literature	
1970	Leah Goldberg	Literature	posthumously
1970	Don Patinkin	Social sciences	
1970	Josef Tal	Music	
1970	Andre De Vries	Medicine	
1971	Saul Lieberman	Jewish studies	
1971	Haim Ormian	Education	
1971	Zeev Tseltner	Jurisprudence	
1971	Itzhak Arnon	Agriculture	
1971	Arie Aroch	Painting	
1972	David Ayalon	Humanities	
1972	Yocheved Bat-Miriam	Literature	
1972	David Ginsburg	Exact sciences	
1972	Leo Sachs	Life sciences	
1972	Ya'acov Rechter	Architecture	
1972	Avraham Harzfeld	Special contribution to Society and the State	First recipient of the Prize for "Special contribution to Society".
1973	Yehuda Even-Shmuel	Jewish studies	
1973	Yad Harav Herzog	Rabbinical literature	Organization. Awarded in respect of Complete Israeli Talmud Institute project.
1973	Dorothea Krook-Gilead	Humanities	
1973	Shalom Yosef Shapira ("Shin Shalom")	Literature	
1973	Ben-Zion Dinur	Education	Also awarded the Israel Prize in 1958.
1973	Shmuel Noah Eisenstadt	Social sciences	
1973	Aryeh Dvoretzky	Exact sciences	
1973	Heinrich Mendelssohn	Life sciences	
1973	Richard Stein	Medicine	
1973	Haim Halperin	Agriculture	
1973	Reuven Rubin	Painting	
1973	Hanna Maron	Theatre	
1973	Sara Levi-Tanai	Dance	
1973	Aryeh Elhanani	Architecture	
1973	Pinchas Rosen	Jurisprudence	
1973	Shaul Avigur	Special contribution to Society and the State	
1973	Yad Vashem, Holocaust Martyrs' Remembrance Authority	Special contribution to Society and the State	Organization. Prize awarded for the Encyclopedia of Jewish Communities (Pinkas HaKehillot) project. Yad Vashem also awarded the Israel Prize in 2003.
1974	Shraga Abramson	Jewish studies	
1974	Raphael David Levine	Exact sciences	
1974	Isaac Berenblum	Life sciences	
1974	Yedidya Admon	Music	
1974	Schmuel Hugo Bergmann	Special contribution to Society and the State	Also awarded the Israel Prize in 1954.
1974	Yehoshua Alouf	Special contribution to Society and the State in Sports	First recipient of the prize who was a sportsperson.
1975	Simon Halkin	Literature	
1975	Arieh Simon	Education	
1975	Yoel Zussman	Jurisprudence	
1975	Aharon Barak	Jurisprudence	
1975	Miriam Bernstein-Cohen	Theatre	
1975	Golda Meir	Special contribution to Society and the State	
1975	Helena Kagan	Special contribution to Society and the State in community service	
1976	Eliezer Waldenberg	Rabbinical literature	
1976	Josef Rom	Technology and Engineering	First recipient of the prize for Engineering or technology.
1976	Gabriel Baer	Arabic linguistics	One of the first two recipients of the prize for Arabic linguistics.
1976	Ezra Mani	Arabic linguistics	One of the first two recipients of the prize for Arabic linguistics.
1976	Mordechai (Moti) Kirschenbaum	Radio, Television and Cinema	
1976	Simcha Holzberg	Special contribution to Society and the State	
1976	Ezra Korine	Special contribution to Society and the State	
1976	Rivka Guber	Special contribution to Society and the State	
1976	Yakov Maimon	Special contribution to Society and the State	
1977	Raphael Mahler	History of the Jewish people	
1977	Menahem Stern	History of the Jewish people	
1977	Nahman Avigad	Land of Israel studies	First recipient of the prize for the study or Knowledge of the "Land of Israel".
1977	David Amiran	Geography	First recipient of the prize specifically for geography.
1977	Shmuel Avitzur	Cultural research	
1977	Zvi Avidov	Agriculture	
1977	Jacob Ephrat	Agriculture	
1977	Elisheva Cohen	Design	One of first two recipients of the prize specifically for Design.
1977	Yona Fischer	Design	One of first two recipients of the prize specifically for Design.
1977	Dani Karavan	Sculpture	
1977	Esther Levit	Special contribution to work	
1977	Avraham Yaakov	Special contribution to work	
1977	Avraham Klier	Special contribution to industry	
1978	Nachum Guttman	Children's literature	
1978	Anda Pinkerfeld Amir	Children's literature	
1978	Levin Kipnis	Children's literature	
1978	Avraham Even-Shoshan	Hebrew language	
1978	Haim Baruch Rosen	Linguistics	First recipient of the prize specifically for linguistics.
1978	Louis (Eliyahu) Guttman	Social sciences	
1978	Nathan J. Saltz	Medicine	
1978	Gary Bertini	Music	
1978	Rachel Yanait Ben-Zvi	Special contribution to Society and the State	
1978	Moshe Zvi Neria	Special contribution to Society and the State	
1979	Isaiah Tishbi	Jewish studies	
1979	Menachem Elon	Hebrew law	
1979	Baruch Ben-Yehuda	Education	
1979	Yitzchak Raphael Halevi Etzion	Education	
1979	Yokhanan (Hans) Lindner	Natural sciences	
1979	Orna Porat	Theatre	
1979	Raphael Klatchkin	Theatre	
1979	Tal Brody	Special contribution to Society and the State in Sports	
1979	Yosef Yekutieli	Special contribution to Society and the State in Sports	
1980	David Flusser	History of the Jewish people	
1980	Jacob Katz	History of the Jewish people	
1980	Haim Cohn	Jurisprudence	
1980	Chaim Leib Pekeris	Physics	First recipient of the prize specifically for physics.
1980	Pinchas Litbinovsky	Painting	
1980	Anna Ticho	Painting	
1980	Yosl Bergner	Painting	
1980	Yad LaBanim (in Petah Tikva)	Special contribution to Society and the State in the activity of perpetuating the memory of Israel's (fallen) sons (and daughters)	Organization. Award also noted its founder Baruch Oren.
1980	Baruch Oren	Special contribution to Society and the State in the activity of perpetuating the memory of Israel's (fallen) sons (and daughters)	Noted in the award to Yad LaBanim (in Petah Tikva).
1980	Society for the Protection of Nature in Israel	Special contribution to Society and the State for the environment	Organization. Award also noted Amotz Zahavi, Azaria Alon and Yoav Sagi.
1980	Amotz Zahavi	Special contribution to Society and the State for the environment	Noted in the award to the Society for the Protection of Nature in Israel.
1980	Azaria Alon	Special contribution to Society and the State for the environment	Noted in the award to the Society for the Protection of Nature in Israel.
1980	Yoav Sagi	Special contribution to Society and the State for the environment	Noted in the award to the Society for the Protection of Nature in Israel.
1981	Avraham Sofer-Schreiber	Rabbinical literature	
1981	Joram Lindenstrauss	Mathematics	One of first two recipients of the prize specifically for mathematics.
1981	Ilya Piatetski-Shapiro	Mathematics	One of first two recipients of the prize specifically for mathematics.
1981	Meir Jacob Kister	Arabic Linguistics and Middle Eastern studies	
1981	Gurit Kadman	culture of Dance	
1981	Kvutza Degania Alef	Special contribution to Society and the State in social	Organization
1981	Recha Freier	Special contribution to Society and the State in the service of well-being, community and youth	
1982	Joshua Jortner	Chemistry	First recipient to receive the prize specifically for chemistry.
1982	David Benvenisti	Acquisition of knowledge and love of the Land of Israel	
1982	Zev Vilnay	Acquisition of knowledge and love of the Land of Israel	
1982	Amir Gilboa	Hebrew poetry	
1982	Yehuda Amichai	Hebrew poetry	
1982	Roberto Bachi	Demographics	The only recipient to date of the prize for demographics.
1982	Avraham Yaski	Architecture	
1982	Ruth Amiran	Land of Israel studies	
1982	Haim Gvati	Special contribution to Society and the State in work and industry	
1983	Saul Friedlander	History	One of first two recipients of the prize specifically for history.
1983	Aron Saltman	History	One of first two recipients of the prize specifically for history.
1983	Aharon Appelfeld	Literature	
1983	Naomi Shemer	Hebrew song (lyrics and melody)	
1983	Moshe Wilensky	Hebrew song (melody)	
1983	Haim Hefer	Hebrew song (lyrics)	
1983	Zerach Warhaftig	Special contribution to Society and the State for the advancement of Hebrew law	
1983	Shmuel Rodensky	Lifetime achievement	
1984	Yemima Avidar-Tchernovitz	Children's literature	
1984	Moshe (Max) Jammer	History of science	
1984	Aron (Alfred) Bondi	Agriculture	
1984	Shlomo Ravikovitch	Agriculture	
1984	Shmuel Rodansky	Theatre	
1984	Nahal - Noar Halutzi Lohem (Fighting Pioneer Youth)	Special contribution to Society and the State	Organization
1984	Development Towns in Israel project	Special contribution to Society and the State	Organization
1985	Abraham Sutzkever	Yiddish Literature	The only recipient to date of the prize specifically for Yiddish Literature.
1985	Joshua Blau	Linguistics and Hebrew language	
1985	Henry E. Neufeld	Medicine	
1985	Baruch Padeh	Medicine	
1985	Yad Ben Zvi	Middle Eastern Jewish Literature	Organization
1985	Israel Television in Arabic	Special contribution to Society and the State	Organization
1986	Yeshayahu Avrech	Opinion journalism	
1986	Shalom Rosenfeld	Opinion journalism	
1986	Michael Evenari	Lifework in desert studies	
1986	Yoel De Malach	Lifework in desert studies	
1986	Ulpan Akiva	Lifework in Education	Organization. Prize awarded jointly with Shulamith Katznelson.
1986	Shulamith Katznelson	Lifework in Education	Jointly awarded with Ulpan Akiva.
1986	HaKfar HaYarok	Lifework in Education	Organization. Prize awarded jointly with Gershon Zak
1986	Gershon Zak	Lifework in Education	Jointly awarded with HaKfar HaYarok
1986	Batya Lichansky	Lfework in Sculpture (Land of Israel)	
1986	Yechiel Shemi	Lfework in Sculpture (Land of Israel)	
1986	Yona Sayid	Lifetime achievement	
1986	Eldin Khatukai	Lifetime achievement	
1987	Alex Bein	Zionist historiography	The only recipient to date of the prize specifically for Zionist historiography.
1987	Ezra Zion Melamed	Biblical interpretation and Rabbinical literature	
1987	Menahem Yaari	Economics	First recipient of the prize for economics.
1987	Ovadia Harari	Engineering and Technology	
1987	Miriam Zohar	Acting	
1987	Lea Koenig	Acting	
1987	Makram Khoury	Acting	First Israeli Arab recipient of the prize
1988	Moshe Goshen-Gottstein	Jewish studies	
1988	Adin Steinsaltz	Jewish studies	
1988	Natan Goldblum	Life sciences	
1988	Haim Gouri	Hebrew poetry	
1988	Moshe Shamir	Hebrew Literature	
1988	Sacha (Alexander) Argov	Hebrew song	
1988	Shoshana Damari	Hebrew song	
1988	Arie "Lova" Eliav	Special contribution to Society and the State	
1988	Reuben Hecht	Special contribution to Society and the State	
1988	Teddy Kollek	Special contribution to Society and the State	
1989	Shmuel Werses	Hebrew Literature	
1989	Israel Yeivin	study of the Hebrew language	
1989	Haim Harari	Exact sciences	
1989	Yakir Aharonov	Exact sciences	
1989	Elihu Katz	Social sciences	His wife, Ruth Katz, received the Israel Prize in Musicology in 2012.
1989	Wingate Institute	Sports	Organization. One of the first two recipients of the prize specifically for sports.
1989	Ian Froman	Sports	One of first two recipients of the prize specifically for sports.
1989	Ya'akov Hazan	Special contribution to Society and the State	
1989	Bethsabee de Rothschild	Special contribution to Society and the State	
1989	Israel Exploration Society	Special contribution to Society and the State	Organization
1990	Meir Weiss	Jewish studies	
1990	Nathan Spiegel	Humanities	
1990	Zvi Yavetz	Humanities	
1990	Moshe Altbauer	Humanities	
1990	Moshe Prywes	Life sciences	
1990	Meir Wilchek	Life sciences	
1990	Alexander Levitzki	Life sciences	Family relationship: Son of recipient Jacob Levitski (1953, Exact sciences).
1990	Yehezkel Streichman	Painting	
1990	Amin Tarif	Special contribution to Society and the State	
1990	Raanan Weitz	Special contribution to Society and the State	
1990	Israel Polack	Special contribution to Society and the State	
1991	Haim Beinart	Jewish studies	
1991	Naomi Feinbrun-Dothan	Land of Israel studies	
1991	Moshe Landau	Law	
1991	Daniel Friedmann	Law	
1991	Elhanan Helpman	Economics	
1991	Shmuel Agmon	Exact sciences	
1991	Dov Frohman	Exact sciences	
1991	Devorah Bertonov	Stage arts	Family relationship: Daughter of recipient Yehoshua Bertonov (1959, Theatre).
1991	Yossi Yadin	Stage arts	
1991	Miriam Ben-Porat	Special contribution to Society and the State	
1991	Stef Wertheimer	Special contribution to Society and the State	
1991	Yeshivat Hesder	Special contribution to Society and the State	Organization
1991	Zubin Mehta	special prize awarded to non-Israeli	Special award in recognition of Mehta's devotion to Israel and to the IPO.
1992	Shaul Yisraeli	Jewish studies	
1992	Yehuda Kiel	Jewish studies	
1992	Daniel Sperber	Jewish studies	
1992	Moshe Lissak	Social sciences	
1992	David Navon	Social sciences	
1992	Reuven Feuerstein	Social sciences	
1992	David Erlich	Social sciences	
1992	Yitzhak Wahl	Life sciences	
1992	Emile Habibi	Arabic Literature	First recipient of the prize for Arabic Literature.
1992	Avoth Yeshurun	Hebrew poetry	
1993	Dan Miron	Hebrew Literature	
1993	Gershon Shaked	Hebrew Literature	
1993	Moshe Bar-Asher	Hebrew language and Jewish languages	
1993	Gideon Goldenberg	Hebrew language and general linguistics	
1993	Yehoshua Arieli	History	
1993	Hava Lazarus-Yafeh	History	
1993	Michael Confino	History	
1993	Yehoshafat Harkabi	Political science	First recipient of the prize specifically for political science.
1993	Hillel Furstenberg	Exact sciences	
1993	Shlomo Alexander	Exact sciences	
1993	Jacob Ziv	Exact sciences	
1993	Ram Loevy	Communications, Radio and Television	
1993	Yaacov Farkas (“Ze’ev”)	Communications, journalism	
1994	Moshe Greenberg	Bible	One of the first two recipients to receive the prize for Biblical studies.
1994	Moshe Weinfeld	Bible	One of the first two recipients to receive the prize for Biblical studies.
1994	Haim Zalman Dimitrovsky	Talmud	
1994	Eliezer Schweid	Jewish thought	
1994	Shneur Zalman Feller	Law	
1994	Robert John (Israel) Aumann	Economics	
1994	Michael Bruno	Economics	
1994	Avram Hershko	Biochemistry	One of the first two recipients to receive the prize specifically for biochemistry.
1994	Nathan Sharon	Biochemistry	Family relationship: Brother of recipient Shmuel Shtrikman (2001, physics). One of the first two recipients to receive the prize specifically for biochemistry.
1994	Eliahu Swirski	Agriculture	
1994	Hanoch Avenary	Music	
1994	Yaakov Orland	Hebrew song	
1994	Arie Shapira	composition	
1994	Yad Sarah	Special contribution to Society and the State	Organization
1994	Neot Kedumim	Special contribution to Society and the State	Organization. Prize awarded jointly with Noga Hareuveni.
1994	Noga Hareuveni	Special contribution to Society and the State	Jointly awarded with the staff of Neot Kedumim.
1995	Claire Epstein	Archaeology	First recipient of the prize for archaeology.
1995	Dov Nir	Geography	
1995	Amos Funkenstein	Jewish history	
1995	Yehuda Amir	Psychology	First recipient of the prize specifically for psychology.
1995	Rina Shapira	Education	
1995	Israel Dostrovsky	Exact sciences	
1995	Michael O. Rabin	Computer sciences	First recipient of the prize for computer sciences.
1995	Nathan Zach	Hebrew poetry	
1995	A. B. Yehoshua (Avraham B. Yehoshua)	Hebrew Literature	
1995	Lea Nikel	Painting	
1995	Menashe Kadishman	Sculpture	
1995	David Resnick	Architecture	
1995	Yitzhak Ben-Aharon	Special contribution to Society and the State	
1995	Ada Sereni	Special contribution to Society and the State	
1996	Yehuda Ratzaby	Jewish languages	
1996	Chone Shmeruk	Jewish languages	
1996	Shimon Sandbank	Translation of Literature and poems to Hebrew	First recipient of the prize specifically for translation.
1996	Shlomo Avineri	Political science	
1996	Moshe Barash	History of art	First recipient of the prize specifically for history of art.
1996	Moshe Piamenta	Middle Eastern studies	
1996	Meir Sternberg	general Literature	
1996	Ilan Chet	Agriculture	
1996	Yehezkel Stein	Medicine	
1996	Nisim Aloni	Stage arts – dramatics	
1996	Moshe Efrati	Stage arts – dance	
1996	Arieh Navon	Stage arts – theatrical scenery	
1996	Marcel-Jacques Dubois	Special contribution to Society and the State	
1996	Meir Shamgar	Special contribution to Society and the State	
1997	Yaakov Sussmann	Talmudic studies	
1997	Joseph Dan	Jewish thought	
1997	Shemaryahu Talmon	Biblical studies	
1997	Yehoshua Bacharach	Rabbinical literature	
1997	Hayim David HaLevi	Rabbinical literature	
1997	Izhak Englard	Law	
1997	Yitzhak Zamir	Law	
1997	Ben-Zion Orgad	Music	
1997	Abel Ehrlich	Music	
1997	Andre Hajdu	Music	
1997	Haim Yavin	Communications	One of the first two recipients of the prize for communications.
1997	David Rubinger	Communications	One of the first two recipients of the prize for communications.
1997	Uzia Galil	Special contribution to Society and the State	
1997	Israel Tal	Special contribution to Society and the State	
1997	Avraham Elimelech Firer	Special contribution to Society and the State	
1998	Yehuda Bauer	History of the Jewish people	
1998	Moshe Gil	Land of Israel	
1998	Trude Dothan	Archaeology	
1998	Yona Rosenfeld	Social work	
1998	Arye Levy	Education	
1998	Emanuel Marx	Sociology	
1998	Yehudit Birk	Agriculture	
1998	Rami Rahamimoff	Medical science	
1998	Saharon Shelah	Mathematics	
1998	Dan Shechtman	Physics	
1998	Dahlia Ravikovitch	original Poetry	
1998	Amos Oz	Literature	
1998	Dan Tsur	Architecture	Jointly awarded with Lipa Yahalom.
1998	Lipa Yahalom	Architecture	Jointly awarded with Dan Tsur.
1998	Dan Reisinger	Design	
1998	Hassia Levy-Agron	Stage arts	
1998	Yehudit Arnon	Stage arts	
1998	Yossi Banai	Stage arts	
1998	Yafa Yarkoni	Hebrew song	
1998	Ehud Manor	Hebrew song	
1998	Sara Stern-Katan	Special contribution to Society and the State	
1998	Shlomo Hillel	Special contribution to Society and the State	
1998	Haim Yisraeli	Special contribution to Society and the State	
1999	Moshe Idel	Jewish thought	
1999	Aaron Mirski	Hebrew Literature	
1999	Menahem Zevi Kaddari	Hebrew language	
1999	Menachem Banitt	Jewish languages	
1999	Mordechai Breuer	original Rabbinical literature	
1999	Avraham Steinberg	original Rabbinical literature	
1999	Myriam Yardeni	General history	
1999	Shmuel Moreh	Middle Eastern studies	
1999	Bezalel Narkiss	History of art	
1999	Yehoshua Ben-Arieh	Geography	
1999	Arie Shachar	Geography	
1999	Michel Revel	Medicine	
1999	Yigal Cohen	Agriculture	
1999	Haim (Howard) Cedar	Biology	First recipient to receive the prize specifically for biology.
1999	Menahem Golan	Cinema	One of the first two recipients of the prize for Cinema.
1999	David Perlov	Cinema	One of the first two recipients of the prize for Cinema.
1999	Yehoshua Rozin	Sports	
1999	Esther Roth-Shahamorov	Sports	
1999	Rebecca Bergman	Special contribution to Society and the State	
1999	Jeshajahu Weinberg	Special contribution to Society and the State	
1999	Bracha Qafih (Kapach)	Special contribution to Society and the State	Family relationship: Wife of recipient Yosef Qafih (1969, Jewish studies). The only husband and wife to have both received the Israel Prize.
2000	Menahem Haran	Biblical studies	
2000	Avraham Goldberg	Talmudic studies	
2000	Yonah Frenkel	Talmudic studies	
2000	Hillel M. Daleski	study of Literature	
2000	Harel Fisch	study of Literature	
2000	Gad Ben Ami Tsarfati	Linguistics	
2000	Shaul Shaked	Linguistics	
2000	Yirmiyahu Yovel	Philosophy	
2000	Asa Kasher	Philosophy	
2000	Raphael Mechoulam	Chemistry	
2000	Yosef Zinger	Engineering and Technology	
2000	Amir Pnueli	Computer sciences	
2000	Amalia Kahana-Carmon	original Hebrew Literature	
2000	Meir Wieseltier	Literature and Poetry	
2000	Moshe Kupferman	Painting	
2000	Michael Gross	Painting and Sculpture	
2000	Micha Bar-Am	Photography	
2000	Shulamit Aloni	Lifetime Achievement & Special contribution to Society and the State	
2000	Aryeh Karol	Lifetime Achievement & Special contribution to Society and the State	
2000	Hagashash Hachiver	Lifetime Achievement & Special contribution to Society and the State	Members comprise Gavriel (Gavri) Banai, Yeshayahu (Shaike) Levi and Yisrael (Poli) Poliakov.
2000	Gavriel (Gavri) Banai	Lifetime Achievement & Special contribution to Society and the State	Awarded as a member of Hagashash Hachiver.
2000	Yeshayahu (Shaike) Levi	Lifetime Achievement & Special contribution to Society and the State	Awarded as a member of Hagashash Hachiver.
2000	Yisrael (Poli) Poliakov	Lifetime Achievement & Special contribution to Society and the State	Awarded as a member of Hagashash Hachiver.
2001	Aviezer Ravitzky	Jewish thought	
2001	Gavriel Salomon	Education	
2001	Ya'akov Rand	Education	
2001	Ruth Ben Yisrael	Law	
2001	Yehoshua Weissman	Law	
2001	Marcel Elyakim	Medicine	
2001	Ruth Arnon	Medicine	
2001	Beracha Ramon	Medicine	
2001	Yoseph Imry	Physics	
2001	Shmuel Shtrikman	Physics	Family relationship: Brother of recipient Nathan Sharon (1994, biochemistry).
2001	Zvi Avni	Music	
2001	Yehezkel Braun	Music	
2001	Herzl Shmueli	Music	
2001	Baruch Hagai	Sports	
2001	Abba Eban	Lifetime Achievement & Special contribution to Society and the State	
2001	Mordechai Ben Porat	Lifetime Achievement & Special contribution to Society and the State	
2001	Yitzhak Shamir	Lifetime Achievement & Special contribution to Society and the State	
2002	Asher Koriat	Psychology	
2002	Moshe Brawer	Geography	
2002	Menashe Harel	Knowledge of the Land of Israel	
2002	Shmuel Safrai	Knowledge of the Land of Israel	
2002	Avraham Biran	Archaeology	
2002	Jacob A. Frenkel	Economics	
2002	Ariel Rubinstein	Economics	
2002	Abraham Haim Halevy	Agriculture	Family relationship: Grandson of recipient Yosef Zvi HaLevy (1958, Rabbinical literature).
2002	Itamar Willner	Chemistry	
2002	Ada Yonath	Chemistry	
2002	Ram Karmi	Architecture	Family relationships: Son of recipient Dov Karmi (1957, Architecture) and brother of recipient Ada Karmi-Melamede (2007, Architecture).
2002	David Tartakover	Design	
2002	Dov Yudovsky	Media	
2002	Nahum Rakover	Jewish thought	
2002	Eli Hurvitz	Lifetime Achievement & Special contribution to Society and the State	
2002	Ephraim Kishon	Lifetime Achievement & Special contribution to Society and the State	
2002	Jewish National Fund	Lifetime Achievement & Special contribution to Society and the State	Organization
2003	Israel Ta-Shma	Talmud studies	
2003	Avraham Grossman	Jewish history	
2003	Shulamit Shahar	General history	
2003	Bilha Manheim	Sociology	
2003	Charles S. (Yehoshayahu) Liebman	Government studies	
2003	Menahem Amir	Criminology	One of the first two recipients of the prize for criminology.
2003	Shlomo Giora Shoham	Criminology	One of the first two recipients of the prize for criminology.
2003	Aaron Ciechanover	Biology	
2003	Avinoam Libai	Engineering	
2003	Zvi Ben-Avraham	Earth sciences	
2003	Yosef Bar Yosef	Theatre	
2003	Zaharira Harifai	Theatre	
2003	Yehudit Hendel	Literature	
2003	Aharon Megged	Literature	
2003	Aharon Amir	Translation	
2003	Geula Cohen	Lifetime Achievement & Special contribution to Society and the State	
2003	Meir Amit	Lifetime Achievement & Special contribution to Society and the State	
2003	Yad Vashem, Holocaust Martyrs' and Heroes' Remembrance Authority	Lifetime Achievement & Special contribution to Society and the State	Organization. Also awarded the Israel Prize in 1973, for the Encyclopedia of Jewish Communities (Pinkas HaKehillot) project.
2004	Sarah Yefet	Biblical studies	
2004	Menahem Brinker	Literature	
2004	Dov Noy	Literature	
2004	Avraham Doron	Social work	
2004	Ziva Amishai-Maisels	History of art	
2004	Aharon Razin	Biochemistry	
2004	Joseph Bernstein	Mathematics	
2004	David Harel	Computer sciences	
2004	Ester Samuel-Cahn	Statistics	
2004	Yigal Tumarkin	Sculpture	
2004	Gila Almagor-Agmon	Cinema	
2004	Gil Aldema	Hebrew song	
2004	Yehoram Gaon	Hebrew song	
2004	Yitzchak Dovid Grossman	Lifetime Achievement & Special contribution to Society and the State	
2004	Lia van Leer	Lifetime Achievement & Special contribution to Society and the State	
2004	Moshe Schnitzer	Lifetime Achievement & Special contribution to Society and the State	
2005	Ben-Ami Sharpstein	Philosophy	
2005	Miriam Erez	Management	
2005	Yehezkel Dror	Management	
2005	Aharon Dotan	Hebrew language and Linguistics	
2005	Olga Kapeliuk	Linguistics	
2005	Ya'akov Landau	Middle Eastern studies	
2005	Sasson Somekh	Middle Eastern studies	
2005	Rena Zeitzov	Medicine	
2005	Shaul Feldman	Medicine	
2005	Jacob Bekenstein	Physics	
2005	Alex Livak	Photography	
2005	Ohad Naharin	Dance	
2005	Yitzhak Orpaz-Auerbach	Literature	
2005	Israel Pinkas	Poetry	
2005	Shabtai Teveth	Lifetime Achievement & Special contribution to Society and the State	
2005	Yisrael Meir Lau	Lifetime Achievement & Special contribution to Society and the State	
2005	Cameri Theatre	Lifetime Achievement & Special contribution to Society and the State	Organization
2006	Gerald Blidstein	Jewish philosophy	
2006	Haim Adler	Education	
2006	Miriam Ben-Peretz	Education	
2006	Ruth Lapidoth	Law	
2006	Amnon Rubinstein	Law	
2006	Nahum Keidar	Agriculture	
2006	Zvi Rappoport	Chemistry	
2006	Pnina Salzman	Music	
2006	Mendi Rodan	Music	
2006	Ya'akov Hodorov	Sports	
2006	Ralph Klein	Sports	
2006	Dvora Omer	Lifetime Achievement & Special contribution to Society and the State	
2006	Al Schwimmer	Lifetime Achievement & Special contribution to Society and the State	
2006	Israeli Andalusian Orchestra	Lifetime Achievement & Special contribution to Society and the State	Organization
2007	Elisha Efrat	Geography	
2007	Amnon Cohen	Knowledge of the Land of Israel	
2007	Shalom H. Schwartz	Psychology	
2007	Nissan Liviatan	Economics	
2007	Zvi Selinger	Biology	
2007	Zvi Hashin	Engineering	
2007	Yaacov Yaar	Architecture	
2007	Ada Karmi-Melamede	Architecture	Family relationships: Daughter of recipient Dov Karmi (1957, Architecture) and sister of recipient Ram Karmi (2002, Architecture).
2007	Yarom Vardimon	Design	
2007	Nahum Barnea	Communications	
2007	The Responsa Project (Project Hashut)	Rabbinical literature	Organization
2007	American Jewish Joint Distribution Committee	Lifetime Achievement & Special contribution to Society and the State	Organization
2007	The Gevatron	Lifetime Achievement & Special contribution to Society and the State	Folk singers group
2007	Dov Lautman	Lifetime Achievement & Special contribution to Society and the State	
2007	Alice Shalvi	Lifetime Achievement & Special contribution to Society and the State	
2008	David Weiss Halivni	Talmudic studies	
2008	Anita Shapira	History	
2008	Benjamin Isaac	History	
2008	Sammy Smooha	Sociology	
2008	Zeev Sternhell	Political science	
2008	Moshe Oren	Biochemistry	
2008	Noga Alon	Mathematics	
2008	Adi Shamir	Computer sciences	
2008	Pinchas Cohen Gan	Painting	
2008	Rene Yerushalmi	Theatre	
2008	Nissan Nativ	Theatre	Posthumous receipt of Prize.
2008	Ida Fink	Literature	
2008	Tuvya Ruebner	Hebrew poetry	
2008	Nili Mirsky	Hebrew translation	
2008	Jewish Agency	Lifetime Achievement & Special contribution to Society and the State	Organization
2008	Manufacturers Association of Israel	Lifetime Achievement & Special contribution to Society and the State	Organization
2008	Youth Movements Council	Lifetime Achievement & Special contribution to Society and the State	Organization
2008	Ezer Mizion	Lifetime Achievement & Special contribution to Society and the State	Organization
2008	Perach	Lifetime Achievement & Special contribution to Society and the State	Organization
2008	Women's International Zionist Organization (WIZO)	Lifetime Achievement & Special contribution to Society and the State	Organization. Joint award to three Israeli women's organization, WIZO, Na'amat and Emunah.
2008	Na'amat	Lifetime Achievement & Special contribution to Society and the State	Organization. Joint award to three Israeli women's organization, WIZO, Na'amat and Emunah.
2008	Emunah (National Religious Women's Movement)	Lifetime Achievement & Special contribution to Society and the State	Organization. Joint award to three Israeli women's organization, WIZO, Na'amat and Emunah.
2009	Emanuel Tov	Biblical studies	
2009	Israel Levin	Literature	
2009	Reuven Tsur	Literature	
2009	Zahava Solomon	Social work	
2009	Mordechai Rotenberg	Social work	
2009	Amihai Mazar	Archaeology	
2009	Zvi Laron	Medicine	
2009	Itamar Procaccia	Physics	
2009	Micha Ullman	Sculpture	
2009	Yehuda (Judd) Neeman	Cinema	
2009	Nachum (Nahtche) Heiman	Hebrew song	
2009	Dov Seltzer	Hebrew song	
2009	Israel Democracy Institute	Lifetime Achievement & Special contribution to Society and the State	Organization
2009	Ruth Rasnic	Lifetime Achievement & Special contribution to Society and the State	
2009	Mordechai Shani	Lifetime Achievement & Special contribution to Society and the State	
2010	Avishai Margalit	Philosophy	
2010	Hanoch Bartov	Literature	
2010	Aryeh Sivan	Poetry	
2010	Abraham Tal	Hebrew Linguistics	
2010	Arye Levin	General Linguistics	
2010	Moshe Adad	criminology	
2010	Yair Aharoni	administrative science	
2010	Abraham Nitzan	Chemistry	
2010	Yehoshua Kolodny	Earth sciences	
2010	Jonathan Gressel	Agriculture	
2010	Peter Mirom	Photography	
2010	Suzanne Dellal Center for Dance and Theater	Dance	Organization
2010	Aharon Yadlin	Lifetime Achievement & Special contribution to Society and the State	
2010	Yardena Cohen	Lifetime Achievement & Special contribution to Society and the State	
2010	Kamal Mansour	Lifetime Achievement & Special contribution to Society and the State	
2010	ILAN - Israel Foundation for Handicapped Children	Lifetime Achievement & Special contribution to Society and the State	Organization
2011	Michael Schwarz	Jewish thought	
2011	Yosef Shiloh	Life sciences	
2011	Ruth Gavison	Legal research	
2011	Pnina Klein	Education	
2011	David Harari	Engineering	
2011	Ya'acov Dorchin	Visual arts	
2011	Noam Sheriff	The study of music	Members of the selection Committee – Betty Olivero who was selected by N. Sheriff for the E.M.E.T. Prize in 2015
2011	Shimon Mizrahi	Sports	
2011	Hulda Gurevitch	Lifetime Achievement & Special contribution to Society and the State	
2011	Eli Alaluf	Lifetime Achievement & Special contribution to Society and the State	
2012	David Kazhdan	Mathematics and Computer sciences	
2012	Shlomo Bentin	Psychology	
2012	David Milstein	Chemistry and Physics	
2012	Ruth Katz	Lifetime Achievement & Special contribution to Society and the State	
2012	Dalia Cohen	Lifetime Achievement & Special contribution to Society and the State	
2012	Azaria Alon	Lifetime Achievement & Special contribution to Society and the State	
2012	Haim Drukman	Education	
2012	Yoav Benjamini	Statistics	
2012	Nathan Shaham	Hebrew Literature and poetry	
2012	Ya'akov Ahimeir	communications	
2013	Gedeon Dagan	earth science	
2013	Nathan Nelson	Life Sciences	
2013	Yosef Kaplan	History of the Jewish people	
2013	Chava Turniansky	Jewish language and Literature	
2013	Adam Mazor	Architecture	
2013	Yoram Bilu	Sociology and Anthropology	
2013	Nola Chelton	Stage arts	
2013	Eliyahu Hacohen	Lifetime Achievement & Special contribution to Society and the State	
2013	Ron Nachman	Lifetime Achievement & Special contribution to Society and the State	
2014	Shamma Friedman	Talmud	
2014	Mordechai Segev	Physics and Chemistry	
2014	Yaacov Katan	Plant pathology and entomology	
2014	Irad Malkin	History	
2014	Aharon Lichtenstein	Jewish Literature	
2014	Marta Weinstock-Rosin	Medicine	
2014	Michal Na'aman	Visual arts	
2014	Haim Levy	Management	
2014	Avinoam Naor	Lifetime Achievement & Special contribution to Society and the State	
2014	Adina Bar-Shalom	Lifetime Achievement & Special contribution to Society and the State	
2015	Chaim Topol	Lifetime Achievement & Special contribution to Society and the State	
2015	Esther Herlitz	Lifetime Achievement & Special contribution to Society and the State	
2015	David Gurfinkel	Cinema	
2015	Erez Biton	Hebrew Literature and poetry	
2015	Shimon Ullman	Mathematics and Computer science	
2015	David Weisburd	Social work and Criminology	
2015	Harold Zvi Schiffrin	East Asian studies	
2015	Shmuel Ahituv	Biblical studies	
2015	Zelig Eshhar	Life sciences	
2016	Meir Lahav	Chemistry & Physics	
2016	Leslie Leiserowitz	Chemistry & Physics	
2016	Edit Doron	Linguistics	
2016	Nurit Hirsh	Hebrew song	
2016	Eli Sadan	Lifetime Achievement & Special contribution to Society and the State	
2016	Doron Almog	Lifetime Achievement & Special contribution to Society and the State	
2016	Yohanan Friedmann	Near Eastern studies	
2016	Eviatar Nevo	Life sciences	
2016	David Shulman	Religious studies and Philosophy	
2016	Hadas Efrat	Stage arts	
2016	Yossi Katz	Geography, Archeology, and Land of Israel studies	
2017	Ágnes Keleti	Sports	
2017	Tzvika Levy	Lifetime Achievement & Special contribution to Society and the State	
2017	David Beeri	Lifetime Achievement & Special contribution to Society and the State	
2017	Yosef Yarden	Life sciences	
2017	Arie Vardi	Music	
2017	Malka Margalit	Education	
2017	Yehuda Liebes	Jewish thought	
2017	Uri Shaked	Engineering	
2018	Ron Ben-Yishai	Journalism	
2018	David Grossman	Literature	
2018	Shlomo Havlin	Physics	
2018	Sergiu Hart	Economics	
2018	Alexander Lubotzky	Mathematics and Computer Science	
2018	Miriam Peretz	Lifetime Achievement & Special contribution to Society and the State	
2018	Yitzhak Schlesinger	Psychology	
2019	Amnon Ben-Tor	Archaeology	
2019	Naomi Polani	Theater and Dance	
2019	Dan Yakir	Environmental sciences, geology and atmospheric sciences	
2020	Joseph Klafter	Chemistry and Physics	
2020	Avishay Braverman	Lifetime Achievement	
2021	Nitza Ben-Dov	Hebrew Literature	
2021	Michal Bat-Adam	Film Art	
2021	Oded Goldreich	Mathematics & Computer Sciences	Prize blocked by politicians, Supreme Court decided in favour
2021	Eli Keshet	Life Sciences	
2021	Ben-Ami Shillony	Far Eastern Studies	
2021	Nurit Zarchi	Literature	
2021	Joseph Ciechanover	Special contribution to Society and the State	
2021	Yair Zakovitch	Biblical Studies	
2022	Moussa B.H. Youdim	Life Sciences	
2022	Yemima Ben-Menahem	Philosophy Research	
2022	Ruth A. Berman	Linguistic Research	
2022	Avihu Medina	Israeli Music	
2022	Yoram Palti	Entrepreneurship	
2022	Oded Kotler	Theatre	
2022	Shimon Shamir	Middle Eastern Studies	
2022	Izi Sheratzki	Special contribution to Society and the State	
2022	Joshua Zak	Physics	
2022	Maryuma Klein	Special contribution to Society and the State	
2023	Amnon Shashua	Special contribution to Society and the State	
2023	Yoram Dinstein	Legal research	
2023	Emanuel Peled	Chemistry and Chemical engineering	
2023	Amal Nasser el-Din	Special contribution to Society and the State	
2023	Rachel Haber	Special contribution to Society and the State	
2023	Dov Schwartz	Jewish thought	
2023	Daklon (Joseph Levy)	Israeli Music	
2023	Zemira Mevarech	Education	
2023	Michal Schwartz	Life Sciences	
2023	Michal Rovner	Plastic arts	
2023	Jehoash Hirshberg	Music and musicology	
2023	Avital Gazit	Environmental Sciences	
2024	Moshe Edri	Special contribution to Society and the State	
2024	Cochav Elkayam-Levy	Societal Responsibility	
2024	Gershon Ben-Shakhar	Psychology	
2024	Hagai Bergman	Life Sciences	
2024	Miki Berkovich	sports	
2024	Eyal Waldman	Entrepreneurship and technological innovation	
2024	Yitzhak Yosef	Rabbinical literature	
2024	Tsevi Mazeh	Physics	
2024	Vitali Milman	Mathematics and Computer Science	
2024	Shlomo Nakdimon	Communications	
2024	Edna Solodar	Lifetime Achievement Prize	A day after she died, her family was informed that she had won the 2024 Israel Prize for Lifetime Achievement.
2024	Elhanan Team	Citizen Heroism	
2024	Chen Kugel	Citizen Heroism	
2024	Yaakov Ritov	Economic and Statistics	
2025	Yonina Eldar	Engineering Research and Engineering Sciences	
2025	Belu-Simion Fainaru	Interdisciplinary design and art	
2025	Shlomo Maman	Theater, Dance and Opera	
2025	Devora Gilula	Literature, poetry, and translation	
2025	Yaron Tsur	Jewish History	
2025	Zohar Shavit	Cultural and Art Research	
2025	Ruth Kark	Geographical research and knowledge of the Land of Israel	
2025	Nina Avidar Wiener	Lifetime Achievement & Special contribution to Society and the State	
2025	Ronny Douek	Lifetime Achievement & Special contribution to Society and the State	
2025	Yinon Ben Neriah	Medical Sciences	
2026	Yaacov Agam	Visual Arts	
2026	Benjamin Weiss	mathematics and computer science research	
2026	Reshef Tenne	Chemistry and Chemical Engineering Research	
2026	Billie Melman	General History	
2026	Micha Popper	Political Science and International Relations	
2026	Avraham Rivkind	lifetime achievement	
2026	Joseph Chetrit	Hebrew language research	
2026	Adi Altschuler	Young Leadership	
2026	Donald Trump	Special contribution to Society and the State	First recipient of the prize for non-Israeli (besides special prize).

In 1993, Yeshayahu Leibowitz was selected for the Israel Prize for "his life's work and special contribution to the society and the state," but after backlash from Prime Minister Yitzhak Rabin on political grounds, Leibowitz refused the prize in order to avoid "caus[ing a] tangle for the prime minister."

== See also ==
- List of Israeli Nobel laureates
