= Shlomo Hestrin =

Israeli biochemist

- שלמה הסטרין
- Born: 1914; Winnipeg, Manitoba, Canada
- Died: February 2, 1962 (aged 48); Israel
- Awards: Israel Prize in exact sciences (1957)
- Scientific career
- Fields: Biochemistry

Shlomo Hestrin (Hebrew: שלמה הסטרין; born 1914; died 2 February 1962) was an Israeli biochemist.

== Biography ==
Hestrin was born in 1914 in Winnipeg, Manitoba. He emigrated with his parents to then British Mandate of Palestine, now Israel, in 1932.

== Awards ==
In 1957, Hestrin was awarded the Israel Prize, in exact sciences, jointly with his research partner David Sidney Feingold and their student Gad Avigad.

Hestrin's sister, Sara Hestrin-Lerner, was the recipient of the Israel Prize, in medical science, in 1955.

== See also ==
- List of Israel Prize recipients
