= Franz Ollendorff =

Israeli physicist (1900-1981)

- פרנץ אולנדורף
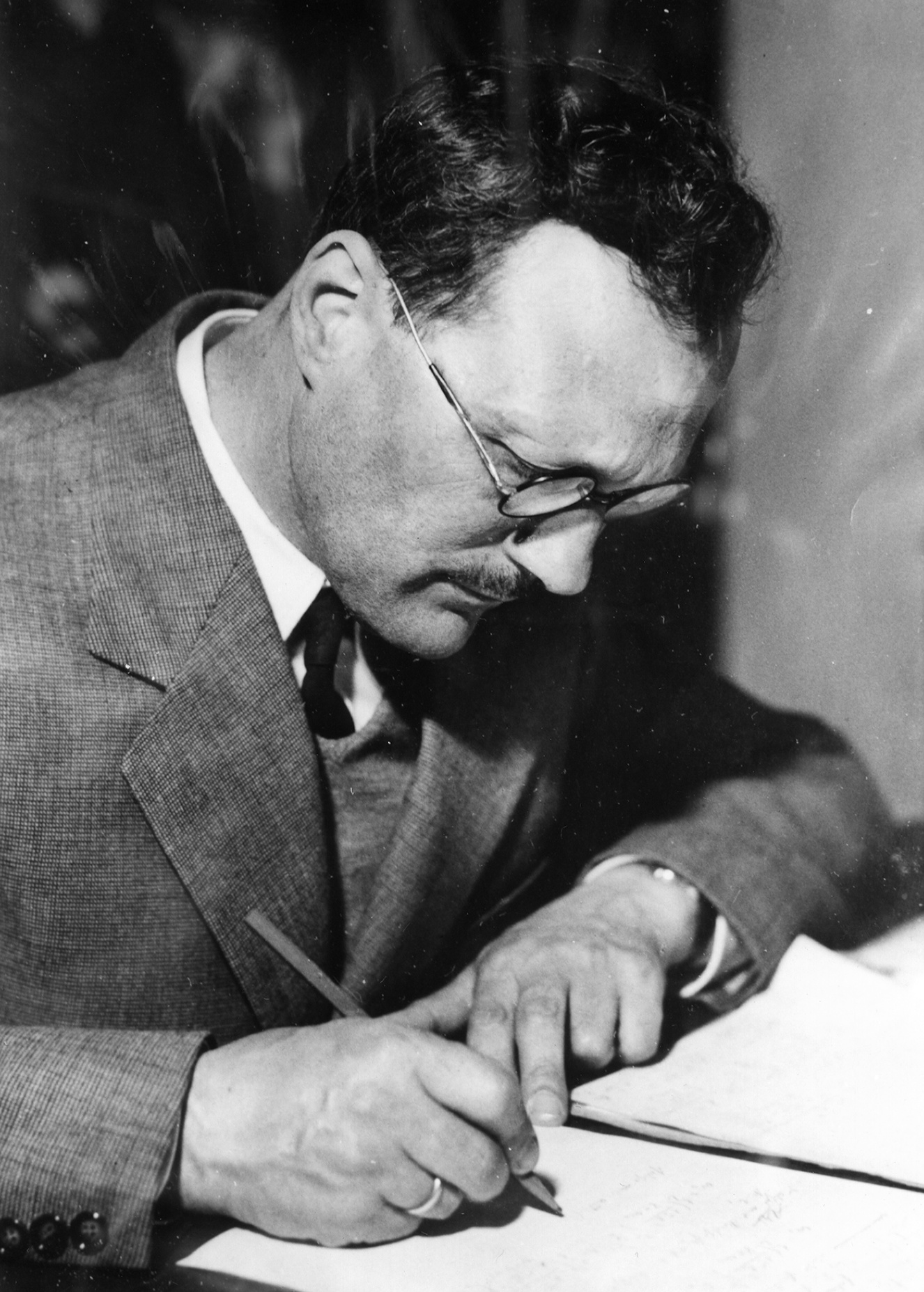
- Born: May 15, 1900; Berlin, Germany
- Died: December 9, 1981 (aged 81)
- Awards: Israel Prize (1954); IEEE James H. Mulligan, Jr. Education Medal (1971)
- Scientific career
- Fields: Physics
- Workplaces: Technion

Franz Heinrich Ollendorff (Hebrew: פרנץ אולנדורף or חיים אולנדורף; May 15, 1900 – December 9, 1981) was an Israeli physicist.

== Biography ==
Franz Heinrich (Haim) Ollendorf was born in Berlin. In 1924, he joined the Siemens research department in Berlin, working under Reinhold Rüdenberg. From 1928 he taught in the engineering faculty of the Berlin Technische Hochschule. Despite protest from his supervisor and university rector Ernst Orlich, the Nazis forced Ollendorff to resign in 1933. Soon after the dismissal, Ollendorff joined the teaching staff of the Jewish public school in Berlin, moving to Jerusalem when the school and staff transferred there in 1934.

Ollendorff returned to Germany in the following year to organize the transfer of Jewish children to Mandatory Palestine within the framework of the newly established Youth Aliyah. In 1937 he was finally expelled by the Gestapo.In 1938, one son was born in Israel. In 1939, he joined the staff of the Haifa Technion and founded the faculty of electrical engineering in which he was professor. He specialized in biomedical electronics and physics.

He was a member of the Israel Academy of Sciences and was awarded the Israel Prize for his research in magnetic fields (1954). He was elected a fellow of the American Institute of Electrical Engineers in 1963 and served as the institute's vice president.

His interest in the education of teenagers made him a keen supporter of the Technion's vocational high school.

Ollendorff wrote books and papers on electronics, physics, mathematics, acoustics, medical electronics, technical education, and other specialized fields. His publications include Die Grundlagen der Hochfrequenztechnik (1926); Erdstroeme (1928); Die Welt der Vektoren (1950); and Innere Elektronik (1955).

== Awards ==
In 1954, Ollendorff was awarded the Israel Prize, in exact sciences.

A plaque commemorating Orlich's courage hangs in the Physics department at the Technion.

== See also ==
- List of Israel Prize recipients
