= David Sidney Feingold =

American biochemist (1922–2019)

- דוד סידני פיינגולד
- Born: November 15, 1922; Chelsea, Massachusetts
- Died: September 26, 2019 (aged 96)
- Education: Massachusetts Institute of Technology, University of Zurich, Hebrew University of Jerusalem (PhD, 1956)
- Awards: Israel Prize in exact sciences
- Scientific career
- Institutions: Hadassah Hospital, Jerusalem; University of California, Los Angeles; University of Pittsburgh
- Doctoral students: Gad Avigad

David Sidney Feingold (Hebrew: דוד סידני פיינגולד; November 15, 1922 – September 26, 2019) was an American biochemist.

== Biography ==
Feingold was born in Chelsea, Massachusetts, United States in 1922. In 1944 he graduated from Massachusetts Institute of Technology with a bachelor's degree in chemistry. Following his graduation, he enlisted in the United States Navy. Feingold served on an Landing Ship, Tank in the Pacific for nine months, from 1945 to 1946. From 1947 to 1949 he continued his studies in chemistry at the Chemical Institute at the University of Zurich, in Switzerland.

In 1949 he moved to Israel. Until 1950, he served in the scientific division of the Israeli Army as a second lieutenant. From 1950 to 1951, he worked at the Hadassah Hospital in Jerusalem. Between 1951 and 1956, Feingold was a student of biochemistry in Jerusalem. In 1956 he was awarded a Ph.D. from the Hebrew University of Jerusalem.

Following receipt of his PhD he returned to the United States and served as a research assistant at the University of California, Los Angeles from 1956 to 1960. In 1960 he moved to the University of Pittsburgh as an assistant professor in the department of biology. In 1966 he was appointed professor of microbiology at the University of Pittsburgh School of Medicine. He also served as an invited professor in Switzerland, Brazil, and Argentina, as well as at the University of Colorado. He taught until his retirement in 1993. He died in September 2019 at the age of 96.

== Awards ==
In 1957 Feingold was awarded the Israel Prize, in exact sciences, jointly with his research partner Shlomo Hestrin and their student Gad Avigad.

== Published works ==
- Infection-promoting activity of levan and dextran as a function of degree of polymerization.
- Synthesis of sucrose and other β-d-fructofuranosyl adolases by levansucrase.
- An enzymic synthesis of a sucrose analog: α-d-xylopyranosyl-β-fructofuranoside.
- The mechanism of polysaccharide production from sucrose. 4. Isolation and probable structures of oligosaccharides formed from sucrose by a levansucrase system.
- Enzymatic synthesis and reactions of a sucrose isomer α-d-galactopyransoyl β-d-fructofuranoside.
- The structure and properties of levan, a polymer of d-fructose produced by cultures and cell-free extracts of Aerobacter levanicum.
- Uridine diphosphate N-acetylglucosamine and uridine diphosphate glucuronic acid in mung bean seedlings.
- Enzymatic synthesis of uridine diphosphate glucuronic acid and uridine diphosphate galacturonic acid with extracts from Phaseolus aureus seedlings.
- Xylosyl transfer by asparagus extracts.
- Sugar nucleotides in the interconversion of sugars of higher plants.
- The 4-epimerization and decarboxylation of DUP-d-glucuronic acid by extracts of Phaseolus aureus seedings.
- Decarboxylation of uridine diphosphate-d-glucuronic acid by an enzyme preparation from hen oviduct.
- Uridine diphosphate d-xylose: acceptor xylosyltransferase of Cryptococcus laurentii.
- Interferon production in mice by cell wall mutants of Salmonella typhimurium.
- l-Rhamnulose 1-phosphate aldolase from Escherichia coli. Crystallization and criteria of purity.
- Biosynthesis of uridine diphosphate-d-xylose. IV. Mechanism of action of UDP-glucuronate carboxyl-lyase.
- Biosynthesis of uridine diphosphate-d-xylose. V. UDP-d-glucuronate and UDP-d-galacturonate carboxy-lyase of Ampullariella digitata.
- Uridine diphosphate-d-glucose dehydrogenase of beef liver. Subunit structure and sulfhydryl groups.

== See also ==
- List of Israel Prize recipients
- Feingold
