= Abhijit Deshmukh =

Abhijit Deshmukh may refer to:

- Abhijit Deshmukh (engineer), Indian engineer
- Abhijit Deshmukh (umpire), Indian cricket umpire
