= Gad Avigad =

Israeli biochemist (born 1930)

- גד אביגד
- Born: 1930 (age 95–96); Jerusalem, Israel
- Education: Hebrew University of Jerusalem
- Known for: Biochemistry research
- Parent: Nahman Avigad (father)
- Awards: Israel Prize in exact sciences (1957)
- Scientific career
- Fields: Biochemistry
- Workplaces: Hebrew University of Jerusalem, Robert Wood Johnson Medical School

Gad Avigad (Hebrew: גד אביגד; born 1930) is an Israeli biochemist.

== Biography ==
Avigad was born in 1930 in Jerusalem. He studied at the Hebrew University High School. At 17, he joined the ranks of the Palmach. He studied at the Hebrew University of Jerusalem, receiving a doctorate in 1958.

Avigad was Associate Professor of Biochemistry at the Hebrew University and, in 1967, moved to the United States and taught at the Robert Wood Johnson Medical School in New Jersey.

== Awards ==
In 1957, Avigad was awarded the Israel Prize, in exact sciences, jointly with Shlomo Hestrin and David Sidney Feingold, with whom he studied.

== Personal life ==
Gad is the son of Israeli archeologist Nahman Avigad.

== See also ==
- List of Israel Prize recipients
