= Azaria Alon =

- עזריה אלון
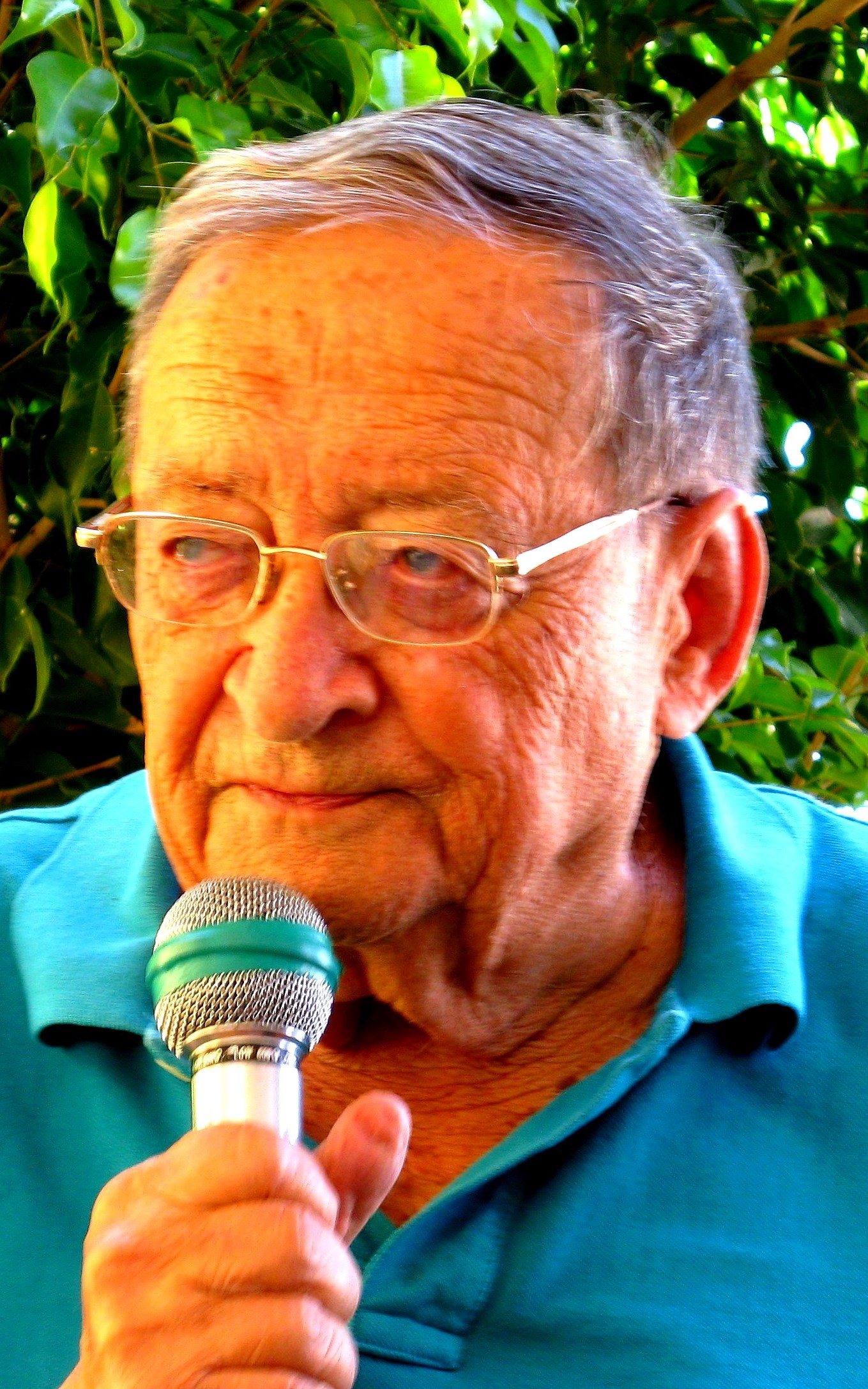
- Azaria Alon in 2009
- Born: 15 November 1918; Ukraine
- Died: 19 January 2014 (aged 95); Beit HaShita, Israel
- Occupations: Conservationist, Environmentalist
- Spouse: Reut Alon
- Children: 4

Azaria Alon (Hebrew: עזריה אלון; 15 November 1918 – 19 January 2014) was an Israel Prize-winning environmentalist, and a co-founder of the Society for the Protection of Nature in Israel (HaHevra LeHaganat HaTeva).

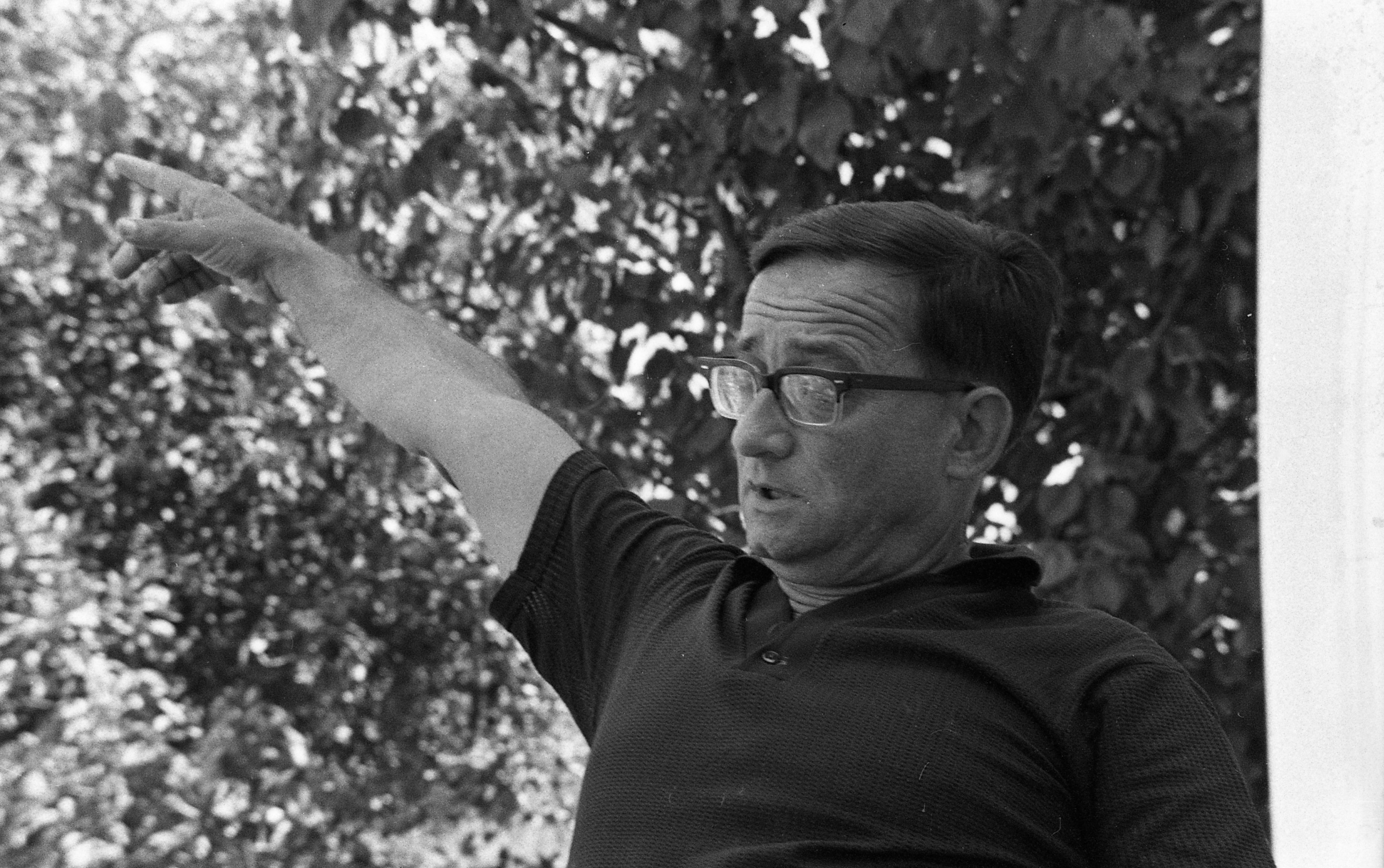
Alon 1969

== Biography ==
Azaria Alon was born in Ukraine. His family immigrated to Palestine in 1925, settling on Kfar Yehezkel, a moshav in the Jezreel Valley. They moved to Kiryat Haim in 1932, the year in which he graduated from the Hebrew Reali School. Alon returned to the Jezreel Valley at the age of 20 to live on Kibbutz Beit HaShita. In 1952, he married Reut, with whom he had four children.

== Awards and recognition ==
Alon received an Israel Prize for lifetime achievement in 2012. He had previously been nominated for the Israel Prize when the Society for the Protection of Nature in Israel won it in 1980. Alon also entered the Guinness Book of World Records as the anchor of the oldest radio program.

== Books ==
- Israel National Parks & Nature Reserves : a Carta Guide, (2014), Carta, ISBN 9652207055

== See also ==
- List of Israel Prize recipients
