= Yehoshua Bertonov =

Israeli actor

- יהושע ברטונוב
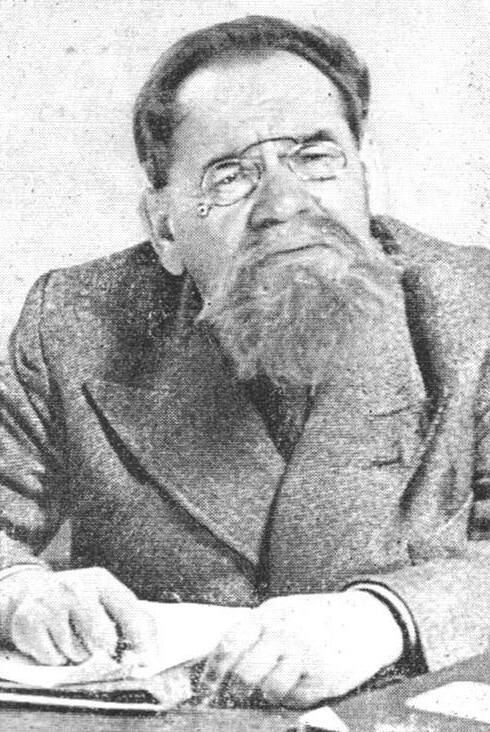
- c. 1930
- Born: March 16, 1881; Vilnius, Vilna Governorate, Russian Empire
- Died: 1971 (aged 89–90); Tel Aviv, Israel
- Children: Devorah Bertonov; Shlomo Bertonov

Yehoshua Bertonov (Hebrew: יהושע ברטונוב; March 16, 1881 – c. 1971) was an Israeli stage actor.

== Biography ==
Bertonov was born on March 16, 1881, in Vilna (Vilnius, Lithuania), then part of the Russian Empire. He acted in the Russian municipal theater in Vilna from 1905 to 1911. After initially playing small roles, he was at one point unexpectedly called upon to play the role of Shmaga in Alexander Ostrovsky's play Guilty Without Guilt, filling in for an actor who had fallen ill; the performance was such a success that he henceforth became the lead comic actor of the troupe.

He went on to act and direct on the Russian stage in other cities; for a time he was the director of the Russian state theater in Tiflis (today, Tbilisi, Georgia), where he simultaneously led a Yiddish amateur theater.

He established a Jewish amateur theatre group that performed in the Sholem Aleichem theatre in Moscow.

In 1912, during a guest performance with a Russian theater group in Bialystok, Bertonov encountered Nahum Zemach, later known as the founder of the Hebrew-language Habima Theatre. Bertonov became a member of an amateur Hebrew theatre group that Zemach had organized in Bialystok at that time – one of the forerunners of what later became Habima. When Zemach arranged for his group to perform at the 11th Zionist Congress in Vienna, in 1913, in order to win support for his idea of establishing a Hebrew art theatre, Bertonov directed the play – a Hebrew translation of Osip Dymov's Russian-language historical drama The Eternal Wanderer. Learning his lines in Hebrew under Zemach's guidance, Bertonov, in turn, coached the other actors in Hebrew.

After the performance at the congress failed to attract or engage a significant audience, the group was left without financial resources, and Zemach withdrew due to illness. Bertonov and Zemach's brother reorganized the group several weeks later and, with the sponsorship of the association Lovers of the Hebrew Language, led the revived group on a tour, performing The Eternal Wanderer in various cities in the Russian Empire, including Minsk, Bobruisk, and Vilna. Thwarted by poor organization, this group, too, disbanded after a few weeks. Nearly a decade later, after Zemach had successfully established Habima in Moscow (in 1918), Bertonov applied to join the tight-knit, idealistic Habima troupe; some members initially opposed his admission, out of skepticism that such a long-established professional actor would have the open-mindedness and readiness for experimentation that the drama collective required of its members, but with Zemach's support, he was admitted in 1922. He emigrated to Mandate Palestine in 1928, together with the Habima Theatre. He played in several plays including HaAnusim, Edipus Rex, Daughters of the Smith and others.

== Awards and honours ==
- In 1959, Bertonov was awarded the Israel Prize, in theatre.
- The Bertonov Hall at the Habima Theatre is named after him.

== Family ==
Bertonov's daughter was the Israel Prize-winning dancer and choreographer, Devorah Bertonov, and his son was actor and announcer, Shlomo Bertonov.

== See also ==
- List of Israel Prize recipients
