= Sara Hestrin-Lerner =

Israeli physiologist

- שרה הסטרין-לרנר
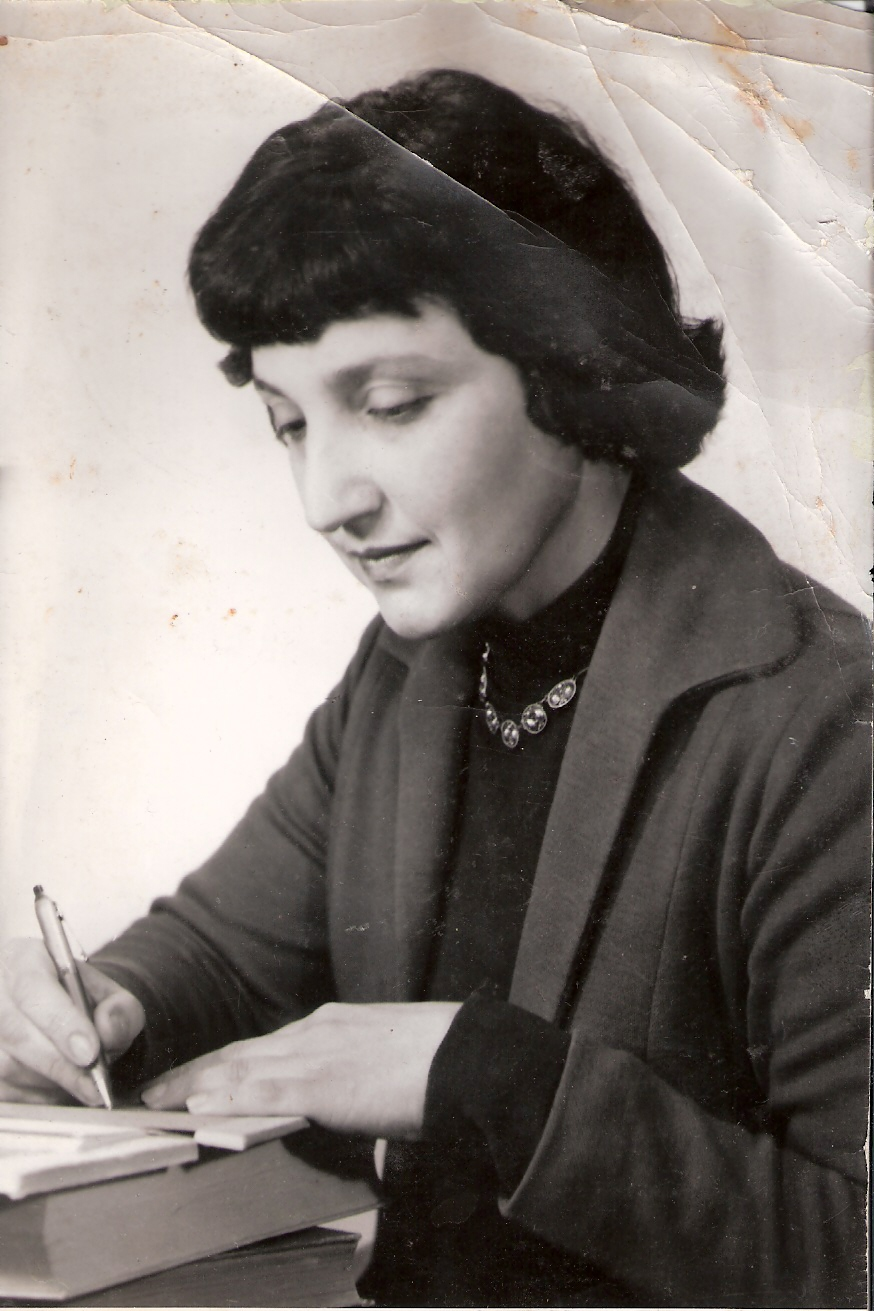
- Sara Hestrin-Lerner in 1950
- Born: May 18, 1918; Winnipeg, Manitoba, Canada
- Died: November 18, 2017 (aged 99)
- Education: Hebrew University of Jerusalem
- Occupation: Physiologist

Sara Hestrin-Lerner (Hebrew: שרה הסטרין-לרנר; May 18, 1918 – November 18, 2017) was a Canadian-born Israeli physiologist.

== Biography ==
Hestrin-Lerner was born in Winnipeg, Manitoba, Canada in May 1918. Aged 14, she emigrated with her parents to the then British Mandate of Palestine (now Israel) in 1932. She studied zoology and received her doctorate in pathological physiology from the Hebrew University of Jerusalem. She died in November 2017 at the age of 99.

== Awards ==
In 1955, Hestrin-Lerner was awarded the Israel Prize, for medical science. Hestrin-Lerner's brother, Shlomo Hestrin, was also awarded the Israel Prize, in exact sciences, in 1957.

== See also ==
- List of Israel Prize recipients
