= Society for the Protection of Nature in Israel =

Israeli non-profit environmental organization

- Founded: 1953
- Founder: Azaria Alon and Amotz Zahavi
- Type: Nonprofit

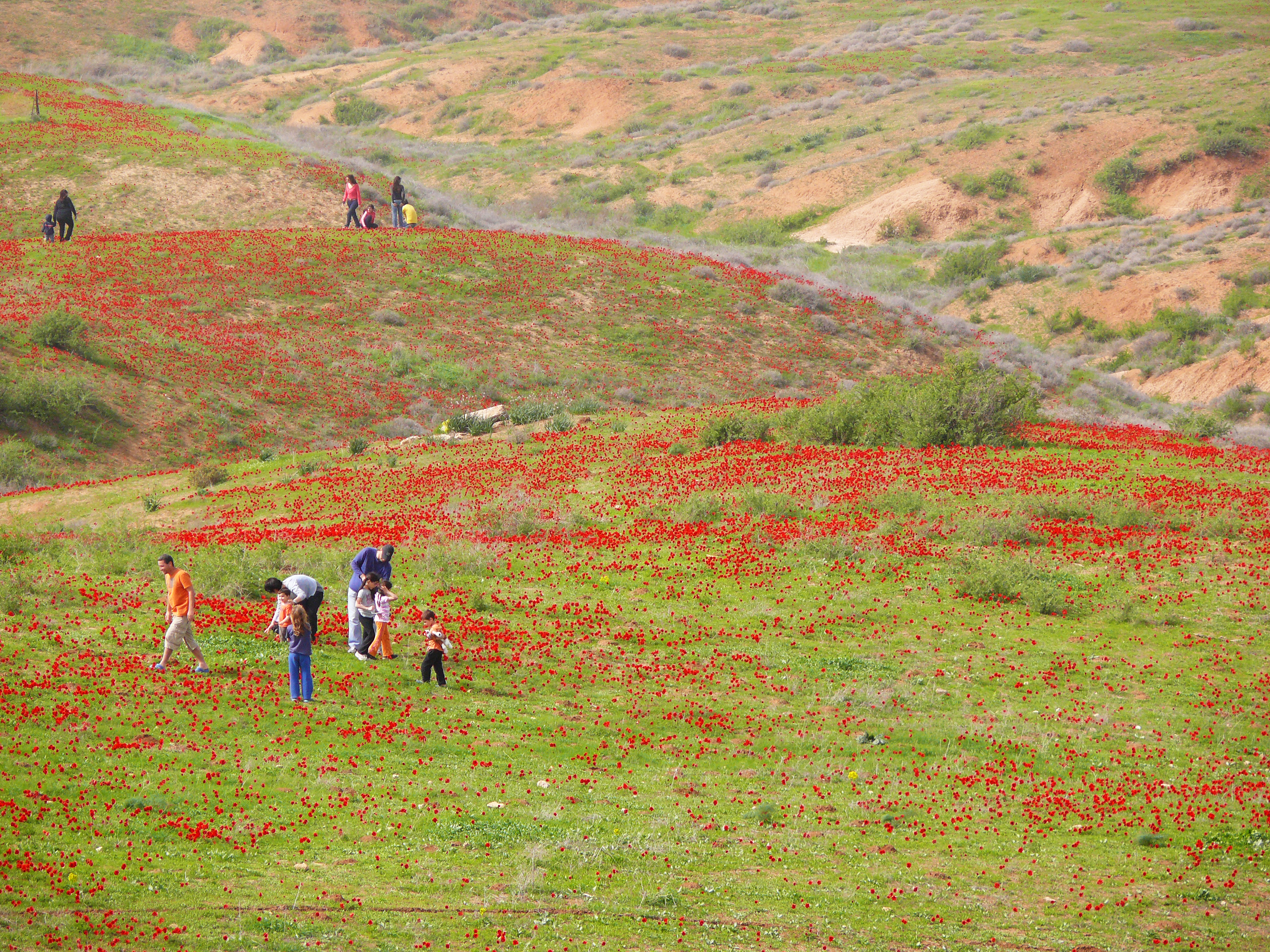
Family hiking in field of anemones, a protected flower species in Israel, Pura Nature Reserve

Society for the Protection of Nature in Israel (Hebrew: החברה להגנת הטבע, HaHevra LeHaganat HaTeva), or SPNI, is an Israeli non-profit environmental organization working to preserve plants, animals, and natural environments that represent bio-diversity, by protecting the lands and waters needed for their survival. It is Israel's oldest and largest conservation organization.

== History ==
SPNI was founded in 1953 by Azaria Alon and Amotz Zahavi in response to plans to drain the Hula Valley. The Israeli government and the Jewish National Fund ultimately did drain a majority of the Hula wetlands to prevent the spread of malaria and to create agricultural land. After 40 years of SPNI campaigning, some 10% of the Hula wetlands were re-flooded in the early 1990s.

In 1980, SPNI, together with Azaria Alon, Amotz Zahavi, and Yoav Sagi, was awarded the Israel Prize for its special contribution to society and the State for the environment.

== Major divisions ==
Best known to the public for sponsoring hikes (today, SPNI's hikes are guided in Hebrew - the only regular nature tours in English are through SPNI-Jerusalem branch), SPNI is also active in political and environmental improvement efforts. Projects have included working out an agricultural management plan for the Hula Valley to insure the health of migrating common cranes, and preventing the draining of a large area of salt pans, the last breeding site in Israel for Nubian nightjars. The campaign to create the 2004 Coastal Law, which forbids new development in any area within 300 meters from the coastline was a notable accomplishment. With almost 800 employees, SPNI is an enormous non-profit organization, with a wide range of activities, thus SPNI is known as well by its various divisions' names as it is by the name "SPNI".

== Environmental Protection Division ==
SPNI's Environmental Protection Division (EPD) is the watchdog and advocate for the little remaining open space left in Israel. Mass immigration has contributed to a drain on water resources, increased land usage for housing and industrial development, and major transportation congestion and pollution issues. Israel today is highly urbanized, with one of the world's highest population density rates; nationally the number of persons per square kilometer is very close to that of Japan, while the Tel Aviv area's density is higher than that of Hong Kong. SPNI is dedicated to finding creative solutions to preserve Israel's fragile ecosystem.

- Rivers – Israel's rivers are in a state of crisis. Problems include drainage – draining water from the waterways for industrial, agricultural and residential use; sewage dumping – sewage and other waste, often toxic, is being dumped in the rivers; lack of enforcement – plans to protect the rivers and streams are postponed; and rapid development – unsustainable land development along stream banks cause serious harm to rivers, streams and water habitats. SPNI's River Rehabilitation Campaign strategically researches the problems, suggests solutions and networks with the various organizations to agree on a master plan, while running a public awareness campaign on river, stream and water management issues.
- Integrated Coastal Management – The Mediterranean coast is one of the country's greatest recreation and tourist assets. The creation of marinas, coastal housing, and private beaches limit the enjoyment of this asset by the general public. SPNI is working at every level to keep Israel's beaches clean, ecologically natural, and accessible to all.
- Sea of Galilee & the Kinneret Trail – Israel's main source of fresh water is the Sea of Galilee. A major beauty spot for Israelis and visitors, the Kinneret has been threatened for years by overuse of its water and commercialization of its beaches. SPNI's Lake Kinneret Project enlists the cooperation of all involved parties in maintaining the Kinneret water levels and in keeping its shoreline accessible to the public for future generations.
- Metropolitan Parks – SPNI promotes conserving and establishing new Metropolitan Parks and recreation areas in central Israel. Lobbying for the legal establishment, infrastructure in public areas, for the purpose of using them as parks in population-dense areas that lack parks. The success of this project will ensure that there will be 8 open spaces in Israel's densely populated central region that will act as recreation, nature and sport areas close to place of living.
- Legal/Lobbying – the Unit for Law and the Environment enables SPNI to address legal questions as they arise and to incorporate legal tools into strategic plans for SPNI campaigns to defend Israel's most precious natural resources. The legal arm also provides legal services to SPNI projects, among them: regional coordinators representing environmental interests on regional planning committees, EPD planner representing environmental interests on the National Planning and Construction Council and its various subcommittees, wildlife, mammal and ornithological centers, and more.
- Transportation/Air Quality – Congestion, traffic and the resulting air pollution have created a public health crisis. SPNI is working to develop a sustainable urban transportation policy involving alternative means of public transportation and promoting new criteria for road construction.

== Open Landscape Institute (OLI) ==
Land has become a precious commodity; the economic incentive for developers is highly enticing. SPNI is at the frontline, preserving the untouched land, still in its natural state, for wildlife, birds, and recreation, while promoting sustainable development, allowing residential areas to expand without clear-cutting the forests Israel has spent so many years planting.

== Birding Division ==
SPNI, through its Israel Ornithological Center (IOC) and International Center for the Study of Bird Migration (ICSBM), leads Israel's partnership in the world of wildlife preservation and protection of bird species threatened by urbanization and economic development. SPNI sponsors the Champions of the Flyway, an international birding competition and fundraiser that raises money for BirdLife International partners around the Mediterranean in an effort to stop illegal hunting and trapping of migratory birds.

Israel Ornithological Center (IOC) - founded in 1980, the IOC works toward preserving endangered species such as the Lesser Kestrel, cranes, and Houbara Bustard. The IOC has several successful ongoing projects, including rehabilitating and conserving habitats for birds; leading research and surveying activities; and running numerous educational programs in schools throughout Israel.

International Center for the Study of Bird Migration (ICSBM) - the center at Latrun was founded by Yossi Leshem who was the executive director of the SPNI from 1991 to 1995, and is the center's director and a senior researcher at the Department of Zoology in the Faculty of Life Sciences at Tel Aviv University. ICSBM - Latrun is the joint initiative of SPNI and the Tel Aviv University. The center deals with many cutting edge and creative educational projects, such as migration research, flight safety, eco-education, ecotourism, and international cooperation.

== Education ==
SPNI's education programs work to foster young people's connection to the land, heritage and to their own communities, with the aim of growing a generation that is concerned with preserving Israel's natural treasures for all time.

- Children Make a Difference – Lively student participation in SPNI's Children Make a Difference program and the connections developed between students from across Israel during large events like the annual children's conference have resulted in the development of a national network of environmentally active young people that take part in environmental campaigns and events. For their part, participating schools are obliged to adopt environmental thinking and green management in cooperation with the community and the neighborhood.
- A Beautiful Israel - All across Israel, children and youth are working to clean up the environment. A Beautiful Israel incorporates adoption of sites, intelligent use of resources, and litter clean-up actions into the eco-education process.
- Obligated to the Environment – All Israeli 10th grade students are obligated to volunteer in their local communities, a minimum of sixty hours throughout the school year through the national education program "Personal Accountability", which teaches youth consciousness of civic responsibility. SPNI's "Obligated to the Environment" program extends students' options to the realm of environmental work.
- Orienteering - SPNI's youth organization uses nature education to nurture future influential leaders for a sustainable Israel. From Afula to Beer Sheva, Orienteering groups meet weekly and offer about 18 hikes a year.
- Multicultural Orienteering – Programs vary from on-site lessons and field trips for Ethiopian and Caucaucus youth, helping them integrate and to come to truly know Israel. Donor-sponsored Multicultural Orienteering activities provide opportunities to strengthen the feeling of personal and social belonging and personal empowerment by dealing with physical and emotional challenges.
- Eco-Community Centers – (in Hebrew known as MaLaShim, which is an abbreviation for "Merkaz Limudei Sadeh") – SPNI operates a network of about a dozen Environmental Community Centers primarily serving development towns with limited social services, whose populations face multiple difficulties such as unemployment and poverty. Malashim offer in-school and after-school fun activities that relate to the environment and nature, including occasional nature trips for the whole family. Over the past three decades, Malashim have become a vital part of local educational and extracurricular programming. Some Malashim bring together underprivileged Jewish and Arab children and some serve populations heavily affected by terrorism, for example in Sderot.

== Urban Branches ==
Spearheading environmental activities in Israel's major metropolitan areas is integral to SPNI's overall endeavors. Field-based and hands-on, SPNI staff run urban eco-centers from which they work with residents to raise awareness of environmental issues and run educational activities for children, youth and adults to promote a sense of pride and belonging to the land. These centers also serve as the core from which SPNI assembles and coordinates grassroots activities, takes part in regional planning activities and promotes environmental issues with local government bodies. SPNI's major branches are located in Jerusalem, Tel Aviv, Be'er Sheva, Haifa and Modi'in.

In 2011, the Russian government asked the organization to vacate its offices in Jerusalem in the Sergei Courtyard complex.

== Ecotourism ==
SPNI is known for its network of field schools named after their location:

- Alon Tavor near Kadoorie Agricultural High School
- Eilat
- Ein Gedi
- Golan near Snir
- Har Hanegev in Mitzpe Ramon
- Hatzeva
- Hermon in Katzrin
- Ma'agan Michael (no accommodation)
- Mount Meron
- Ofra (no accommodation)
- Shikmim/Shiqmim (no accommodation) at Nitzanim (see Ashdod Sand Dune)

They are established adjacent to some of Israel's nature reserves and national parks. Tens of thousands of Israelis and tourists participate in SPNI guided hikes and walks focusing on nature study. SPNI's Field School system combines three main areas of activity: education – teaching youth and adults about the region; conservation – protecting the region's natural environment; and research – gathering information about the region in conjunction with SPNI's various departments. Field Schools are an integral part of SPNI's operations, a focal area for local eco-activities, and play a leading role in Israeli environmental tourism and education.

English-language tours are offered by the Jerusalem Bird Observatory.

== Israel Trails Committee (ITC) ==
The ITC marked and actively maintains 10,000 kilometers paths, 950 kilometers of which represents the Israel National Trail. A few full-time SPNI employees out in the field mark and repair trail markers, from the Galilee to the Negev.

== Logo ==
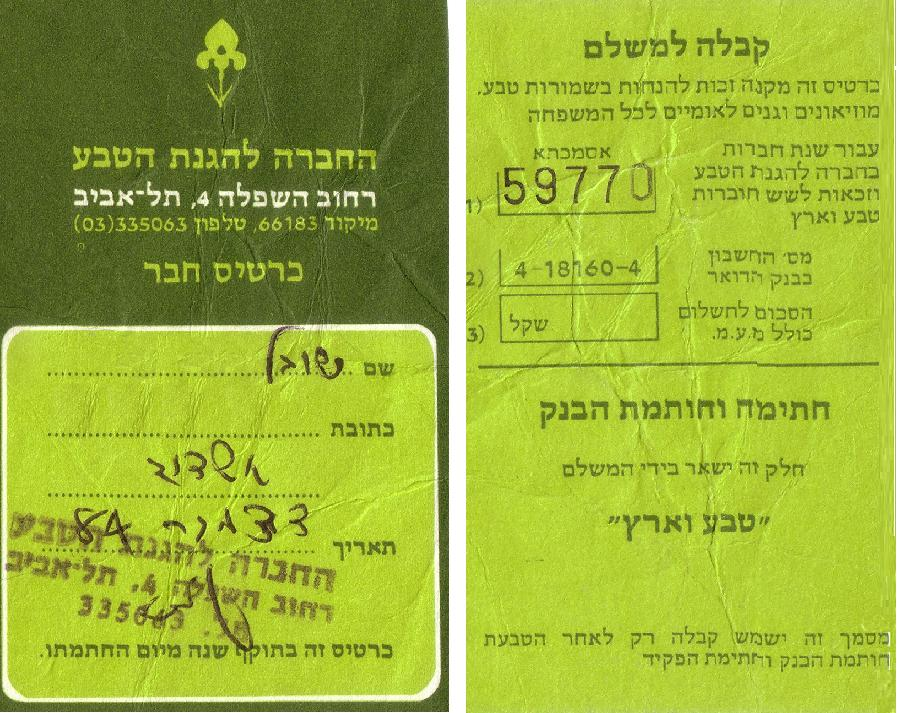
SPNI member card with Iris logo

The Iris haynei (the Gilboa Iris) was chosen, as the logo of The Society for the Protection of Nature in Israel.

== See also ==
- Israel Union for Environmental Defense
- List of Israel Prize recipients
- Wildlife of Israel
