= Devorah Bertonov =

Israeli dancer (1915–2010)

- דבורה ברטונוב
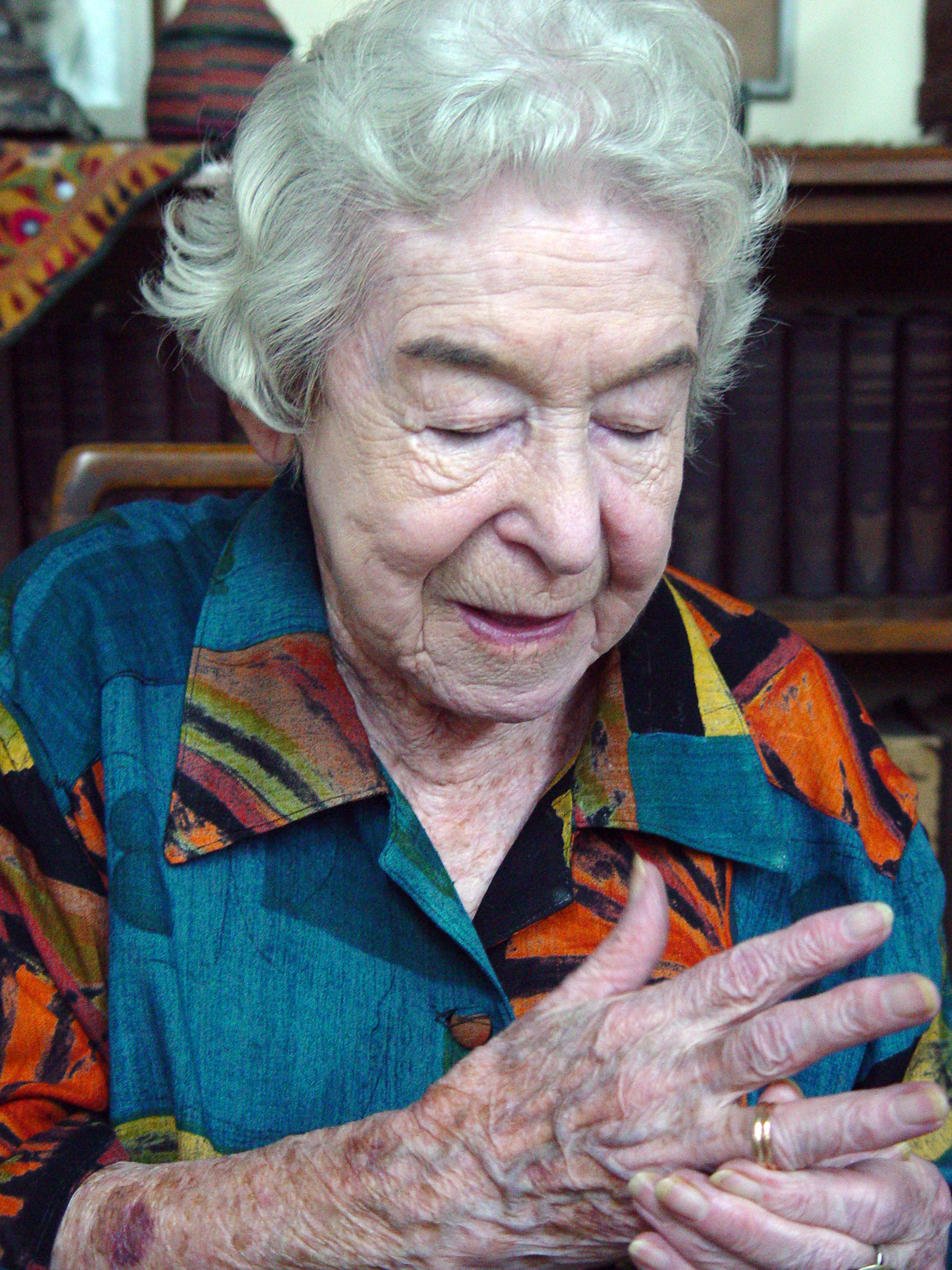
- Bertonov in 2004
- Born: 12 March 1915; Tbilisi, Tiflis Governorate, Russian Empire
- Died: 19 April 2010 (aged 95); Tel Aviv, Israel
- Occupations: Dancer; choreographer; actress
- Years active: 1928–2010
- Spouse: Emanuel Ben-Gurion (m. 1937; died 1987)
- Children: Iddo Ben-Gurion
- Father: Yehoshua Bertonov
- Relatives: Shlomo Bertonov (brother)

Devorah Bertonov (Hebrew: דבורה ברטונוב; 12 March 1915 – 19 April 2010) was an Israeli dancer, choreographer and actress. She was a pioneer of dance and stage arts in Israel.

== Biography ==
Devorah Bertonov was the daughter of Yehoshua Bertonov, one of the founders of Habima Theatre in Moscow, who also won the Israel Prize. She was born in Tbilisi, Georgia (which was then part of the Russian Empire) in 1915. Her family immigrated to Mandatory Palestine in 1928 and settled in Tel Aviv. She studied dance in Berlin from 1929 until 1932.

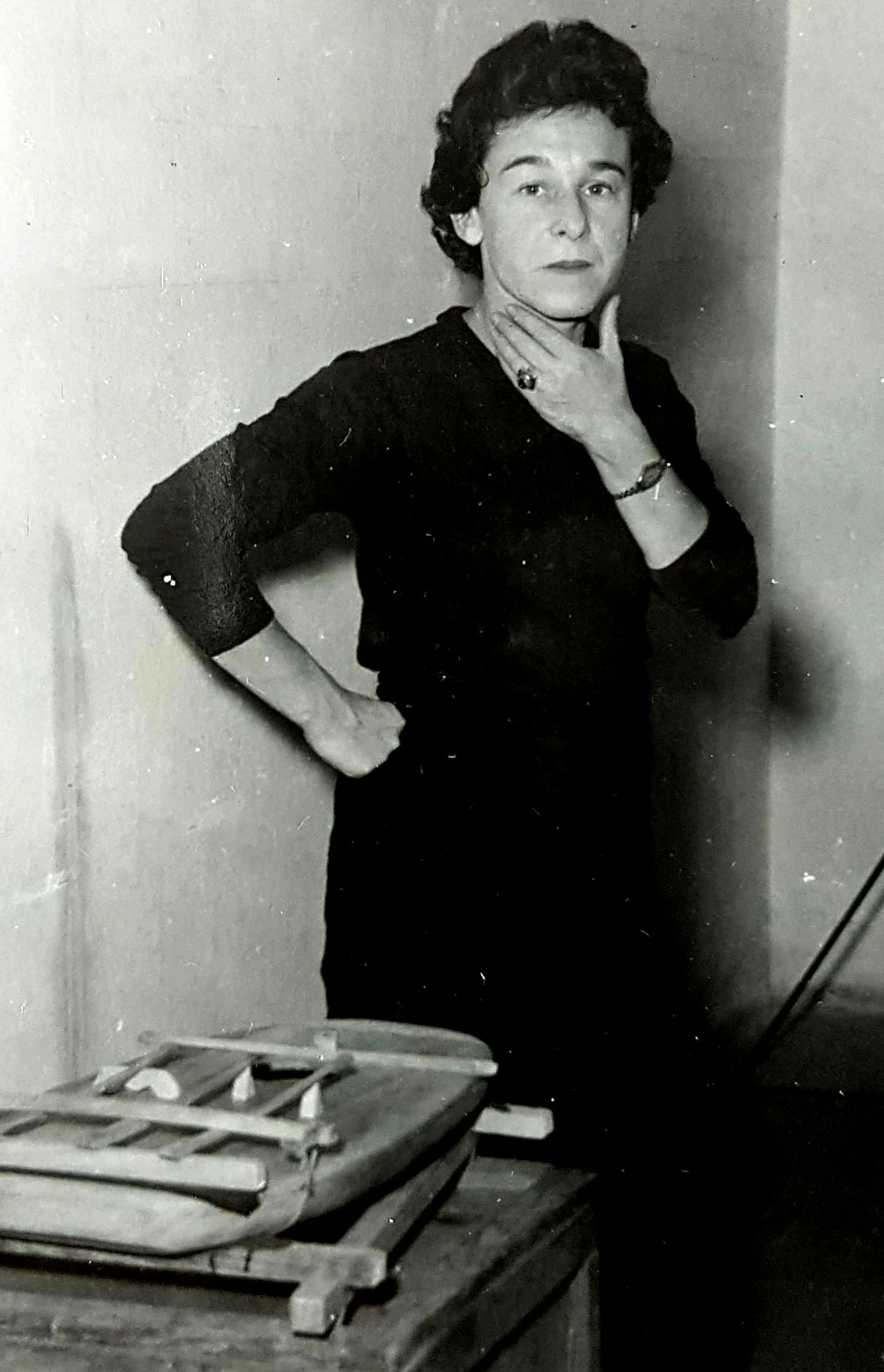
Devorah Bertonov during a recording rehearsal (likely in 1951)

== Awards and recognition ==
Bertonov was awarded the Israel Prize in 1991. Making Way for a Green Leaf is a documentary about Bertonov filmed when she was 85.

== See also ==
- Dance of Israel
- List of Israel Prize winners
