= Joseph J. Talavage =

Professor of Industrial Engineering

- Scientific career
- Fields: Industrial Engineering, Systems Engineering, Complex Systems and Manufacturing
- Workplaces: Purdue University and Case Western Reserve University
- Doctoral advisor: Irving Lefkowitz
- Notable students: Abhijit Deshmukh

Joseph J. Talavage was a Professor of Industrial Engineering at Purdue University. He received his Ph.D. degree in Systems Engineering from Case Institute of Technology in 1968. He published numerous research and technical papers on simulation methodology, including the development of a manufacturing decision support system, and the use of simulation to design improved hierarchical control systems for steel production. He was a consultant to numerous companies and governmental agencies, and was the prime developer of the microNET simulation language.
