= Abhijit Deshmukh (engineer) =

American industrial engineering professor

Abhijit V. Deshmukh
- Citizenship: American
- Education: Purdue University
- Awards: Ralph R. Teetor Educational Award
- Scientific career
- Fields: Complex systems, industrial engineering and manufacturing
- Workplaces: Purdue University
- Doctoral advisor: Moshe M. Barash and Joseph J. Talavage

Abhijit Deshmukh is the James J. Solberg Head of Industrial Engineering at Purdue University in Indiana, United States. He has significantly contributed to manufacturing, decision-making, and complex systems.

Deshmukh received his doctorate degree from Purdue University in 1993, working with professors Moshe M. Barash and Joseph J. Talavage.
