= Rachel Haber =

- רחל הבר
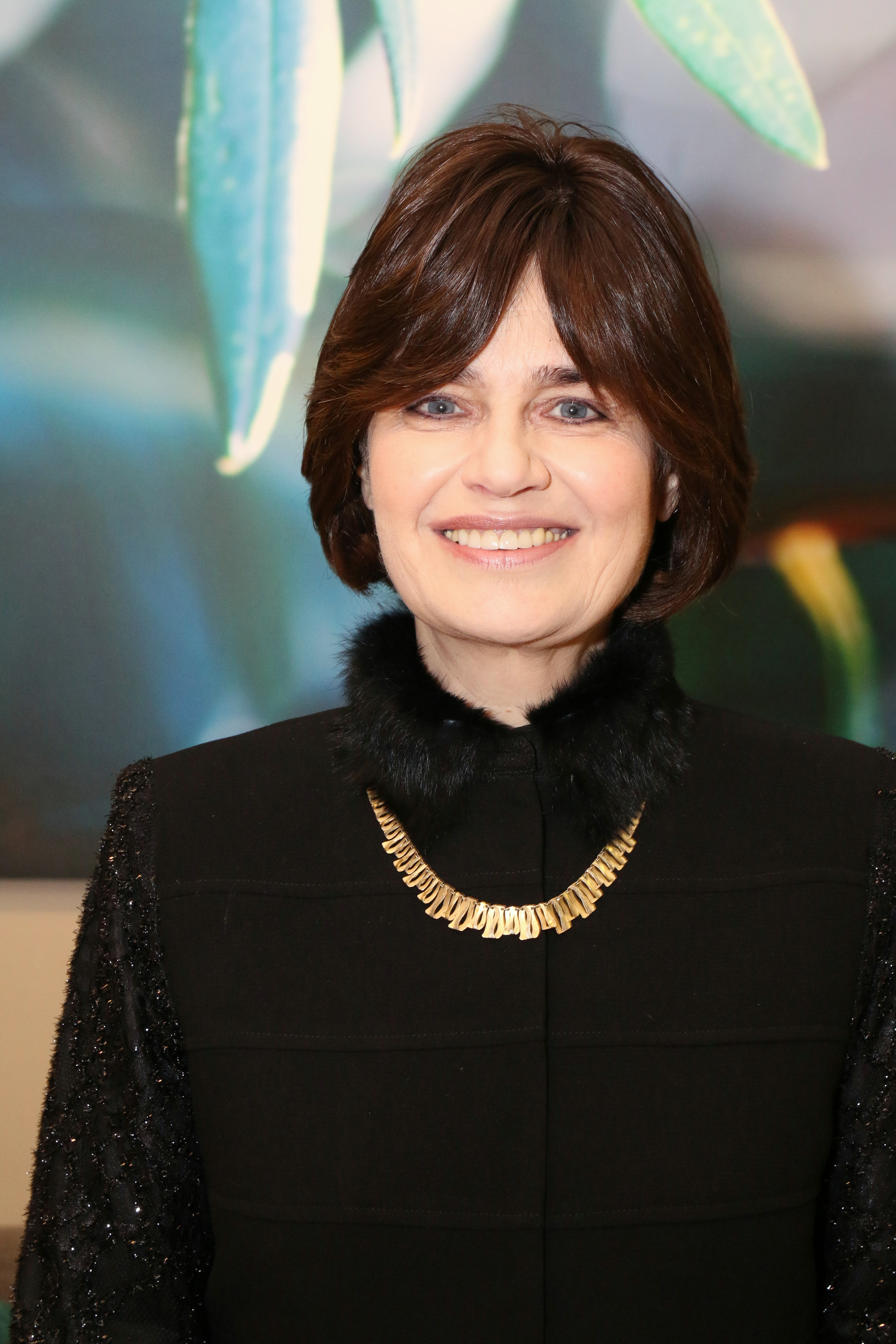
- Born: August 5, 1967
- Citizenship: Israel
- Occupation: Teacher
- Known for: Chairman of Matnat Chaim
- Children: 2

Rachel Haber (Hebrew: רחל הבר; born 5th 1967) is an Israeli education women and the chairman of the association Matnat Chaim (מתנת חיים; lit. 'Gift of Life'). In 2023, she won an Israel Prize on lifetime achievement topic.

== Biography ==
Rachel was born in Jerusalem to Avraham and Sarah Katz, both educators, as the eldest of five daughters. At the age of 12, she relocated with her family to Chicago, United States, for a two-year educational mission. Upon completing their mission, the family returned to Israel.

At the age of 19, she married Avraham Yeshayahu Haber (אברהם ישעיהו הבר). She pursued studies in teaching at the Bais Yaakov seminary and subsequently worked as a teacher, educator, and mentor for female teaching.

In 2009, Haber, along with her husband, co-founded the Matnat Chaim association (which literally translated to "Gift of Life"), an association-organization dedicated to facilitating the search for kidney donors for patients in need of kidney transplanation in Israel. The couple was motivated to establish the association after her husband underwent a kidney transplant and reportedly personally witnessed the challenges faced by patients awaiting a donor match.

On April 23, 2020, During the COVID-19 pandemic in Israel, her husband contracted the virus and died from complications. Following his death, she was appointed chairperson of the association, while continuing her work as a teacher.

In the association, Haber meets with department heads and transplant coordinators at medical centers, delivering lectures on kidney donation, maintains contact with transplant candidates and donors throughout the donation process, and visits donors in hospitals. She also manages the office staff and oversees the association's volunteers.

In 2023, she was awarded the Israel Prize for her contributions. The award committee noted that she "instills kidney patients with a spirit of life and hope, supporting donors, transplant recipients, and their families throughout the process until recovery".

In June 2024, she was awarded an honorary degree from Ariel University.

== Personal life ==
Haber lives in Ha Nof, Jerusalem and is a mom to 2.
