= Micha Popper =

Israeli psychologist

- מיכה פופר
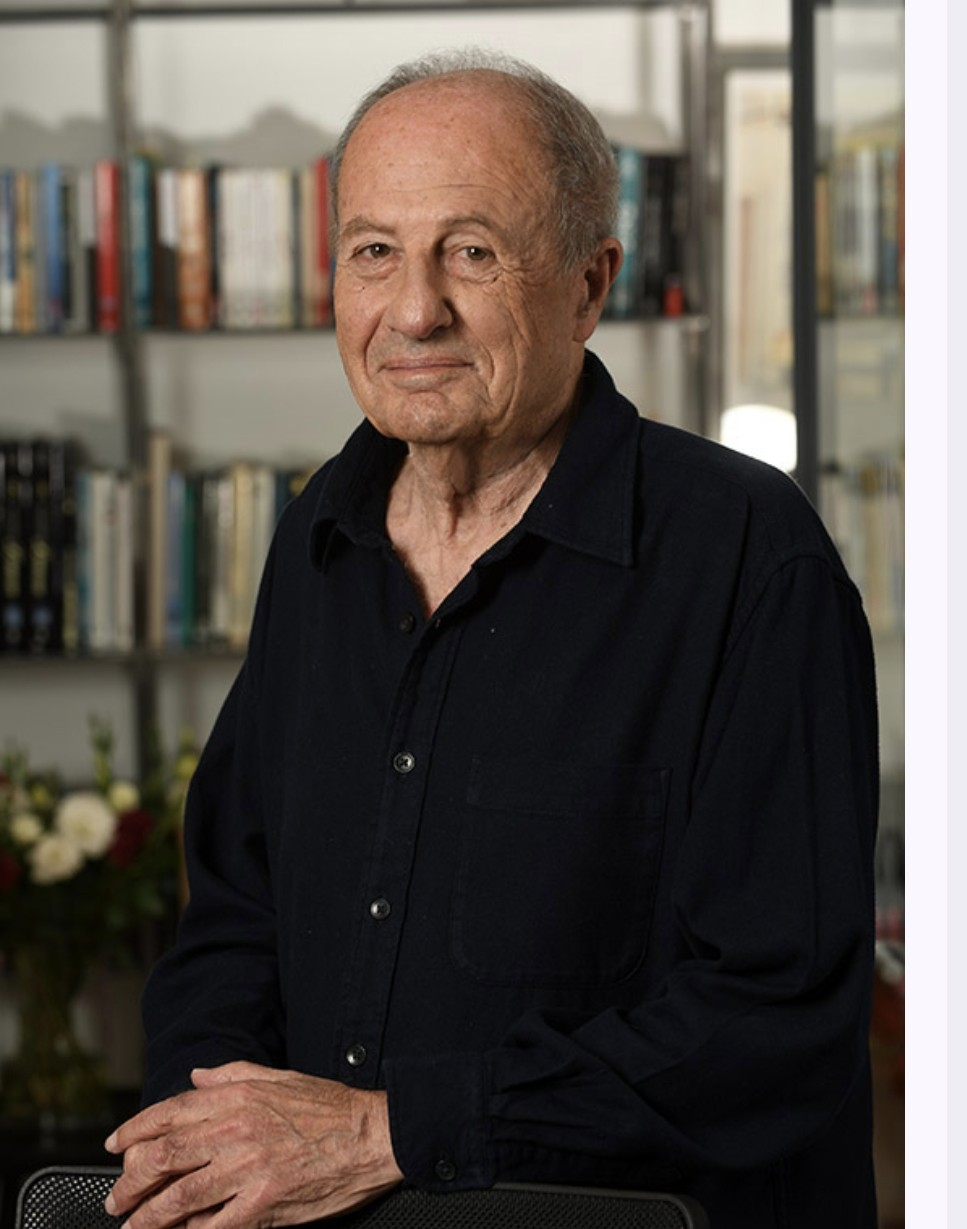
- Born: 1947 (age 78–79)
- Education: Hebrew University of Jerusalem; Tel Aviv University
- Awards: Israel Prize (2026)
- Scientific career
- Fields: Psychology
- Workplaces: University of Haifa

Micha Popper (Hebrew: מיכה פופר) is a professor emeritus in the department of psychology at the University of Haifa, Israel. He was the commander of the Israel Defense Forces Leadership Development School, co-founder and director of the Institute for Quality Leadership in Israel, and, from 1995 he was a faculty member and head of the Organizational Psychology program at the University of Haifa. Micha Popper won the Israel Prize for the year 2026 in political science and international relations. The Israel Prize is the most prestigious award granted by the State of Israel.

== Biography ==
Popper received his BA degree from the Hebrew University of Jerusalem and his MA and PhD degrees from Tel Aviv University.

== Career ==
Popper's early research focused on exploring the roots of leadership in early childhood. Most knowledge in this field is inferred from biographies and studies (based mostly on psycho-dynamic analyses) of well-known people. His work in this field led him to formulate a conceptual framework dealing with three components relevant to being and functioning as a leader: (1) the psychological potential to lead (P); (2) the motivation to be in a leadership position (M); (3) the environment (e.g. role models, accessibility to leadership experiences...), namely the developmental component (D). Popper and his colleagues have contributed to the identification, definition, evaluation and measurement of each of these components.

Popper observed that in the Western world, particularly the US, leadership was usually perceived as a positive phenomenon and leaders were socially respected, often even admired. However, history also points to dark manifestations of leadership. This aspect has been discussed by historians but largely neglected in psychological research on leadership. Popper's work sheds light on the psychological foundations of the dark side of leadership.

He argued that psychological research on leadership was excessively preoccupied with leaders and there were not enough theoretical and empirical attempts to decipher the phenomenon of followership. Popper's work has thus focused on primary foundations of followership, both the phylogenetic elements and the cultural components that “color” differently leaders’ perceptions and images in various cultures.

Popper has also researched “organizational learning.” His work has focused mostly on how people learn from their own experiences and how lessons learned on a personal level become organizational knowledge.

The first question involves the development of concepts and methodologies for identifying “tacit knowledge” – knowledge created out of experience without awareness. Such knowledge is at the disposal of people when solving problems (as Polanyi puts it:” We know more than we can tell”).

The second question led Popper and his colleagues to study the structural and cultural aspects that characterize effective learning in organizations. These studies focused on organizational learning mechanisms such as debriefing of air force pilots or debriefing of medical staff performing operations.
