= Miriam Erez =

Israeli psychologist and management scholar (born 1943)

- מרים ארז
- Born: 1943 (age 82–83)
- Education: Hebrew University of Jerusalem (BA); Technion – Israel Institute of Technology (MSc, DSc)
- Known for: Research on work motivation, cross-cultural organizational behavior, and innovation in organizations
- Awards: Israel Prize (Management science, 2005); Distinguished Scientific Contributions Award, Society for Industrial and Organizational Psychology (2023)
- Scientific career
- Fields: Industrial and organizational psychology Organizational behavior Cross-cultural psychology
- Workplaces: Technion – Israel Institute of Technology

Miriam Erez (born 1943) is an Israeli industrial and organizational (I-O) psychologist and management scholar. She is a professor emerita at the Technion – Israel Institute of Technology, previously serving as dean of the Technion faculty now known as the Faculty of Data and Decision Sciences. Erez received the Israel Prize in management science (2005). In 2023, she was named a recipient of the Society for Industrial and Organizational Psychology's Distinguished Scientific Contributions Award.

== Early life and education ==
Erez was born in 1943. She completed her first degree at the Hebrew University of Jerusalem in psychology and sociology (1965). She later earned an MSc (1969) and a DSc (1972) from the Technion in behavioral sciences and management, with an emphasis on I-O psychology. She spent a postdoctoral year in the Department of Psychology at the University of Maryland (1975–1976).

== Academic career ==
Erez joined the Technion’s Faculty of Industrial Engineering and Management (now the Faculty of Data and Decision Sciences), and she served as dean of the faculty from 1996 to 1998. She held visiting appointments and sabbaticals at multiple institutions, including the University of Illinois, the University of California, Berkeley, Nanyang Technological University (Singapore), and Peking University (China).

== Research ==
Erez has conducted research on work motivation, organizational innovation, and cross-cultural differences in organizational behavior.

She served as editor of Applied Psychology: An International Review from 1997 to 2003 and has served on journal editorial boards in management and applied psychology. In 2010, she was appointed chair of Israel’s Council for the Promotion of Women in Science and Technology.

== Awards and honors ==
- Israel Prize in management science (2005)
- Distinguished Scientific Contributions Award (Distinguished Scientific Contributions: Miriam Erez), Society for Industrial and Organizational Psychology (2023)

== Selected works ==
- Earley, P. Christopher; Erez, Miriam. Culture, Self-Identity, and Work. Oxford University Press, 1993.
- Earley, P. Christopher; Erez, Miriam. The Transplanted Executive: Why You Need to Understand How Workers in Other Countries See the World Differently. Oxford University Press, 1997.
- Gelfand, Michele J.; Erez, Miriam; Aycan, Zeynep. “Cross-Cultural Organizational Behavior.” Annual Review of Psychology 58 (2007): 479–514.
