= Tsevi Mazeh =

Israeli astronomer

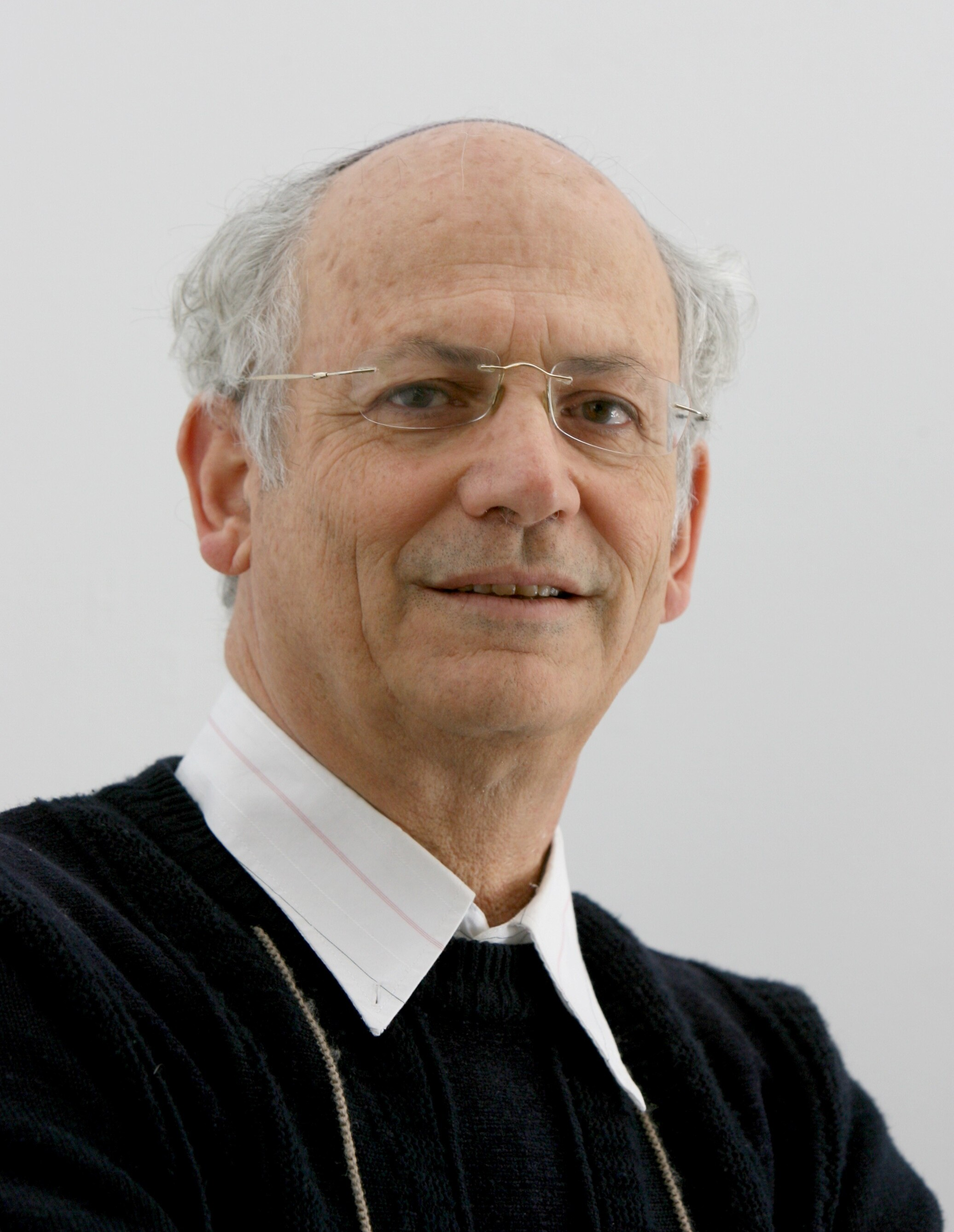
Tsevi Mazeh

Tsevi Mazeh (Hebrew: צבי מזא"ה; born 1946) is an Israeli astrophysicist and Professor Emeritus at the School of Physics and Astronomy at Tel Aviv University.

== Biography ==
Born in Jerusalem, son of Yitzhak and Dina Mazeh. Grew up in Moshav Hemed.

Between 1967 and 1979 he studied at the Hebrew University of Jerusalem, where he earned a doctorate in physics.

He carried out his doctoral work on triple-star systems under the supervision of Professor Yaakov Shaham. He has been a faculty member at Tel Aviv University ever since.

He completed postdoctoral training as a fellow at the University of California, Berkeley.

Mazeh was a visiting researcher at Harvard University and at the Radcliffe Institute for Advanced Study there; at the National Air and Space Museum in Washington; at the Geneva Observatory; and at the University of Amsterdam. He was a visiting fellow at All Souls College, Oxford University, and most recently was a visiting researcher at the Max Planck Institute for Astronomy in Heidelberg.

He served as director of the Tel Aviv University Observatory and as head of the Department of Astronomy and Astrophysics.

He led a research group at the Institute for Advanced Studies of the Hebrew University about large databases and planets.

Mazeh is married to Miri and is the father of Merav, Haggi, Yoav, Hanan, and Itzik.

== Scientific Research ==
Prof. Mazeh was among the first to search for planets outside the solar system, and took part in discovering the invisible small-mass companion of the star HD 114762, which was the first candidate exoplanet. Since then, he has studied exoplanets using ground- and space-based observations, serving as a team member on the European CoRoT spacecraft, the American Kepler mission, and more recently the European Gaia mission.

Mazeh also studies black holes found in binary systems, where two bodies are orbiting one another. He took part in an international team of astronomers that succeeded, in 2007, in measuring the mass of a black hole orbiting its companion in the neighboring galaxy M33, located about 3 million light-years from Earth. Based on that measurement, M33 X-7 was at the time the most massive black hole known in a binary system.

In the early 2020s, Mazeh took part in the discovery of two black holes, Gaia BH1 and Gaia BH2, the closest known to Earth — the first at a distance of about 1,500 light-years and the second about 4,000 light-years, based on data collected by the European space mission Gaia. In 2024 he was among the leaders of the research team behind the Gaia spacecraft's discovery of Gaia BH3, a black hole in a binary system with a mass 33 times that of the Sun. As of 2026, Mazeh is leading the Gaia research group preparing to publish the discovery of additional black holes, a study due to be published on December 2, 2026.

== On Religion and Science ==
Tsevi Mazeh is a liberal religious Jew.

In Professor Mazeh's view, the account of the creation of the world in the Book of Genesis does not match what is known astronomically today. He argues that the core of the story is a theological conception on the relationship between man and God, meant to convey monotheistic faith and the equality of all human beings, who were all born of a common ancestor. The story is set within a cosmological framework based on the knowledge at the period in which the biblical text was written. For example, Mazeh explains that the firmament described in Genesis as separating the lower waters from the upper waters was, according to the ancient astronomical conception, a kind of transparent dome rotating around the Earth, in which the stars were set.

The authority of the Torah, in Mazeh's view — following Yeshayahu Leibowitz — does not derive from any inherent sanctity of its own, but from the sanctity that the Sages (Chazal) conferred upon it. In his view, it was the Sages who shaped the style and form of Judaism, who determined which writings would become canonical and thereby become sacred scripture, and who also determined which commandments would be sanctified and observed, as against other commandments that would be diminished or annulled.

== Positions on Human Rights ==
Mazeh served as chairman of the Netivot Shalom movement for peace and justice. As a member and chair of Netivot Shalom, Mazeh fought for the civil rights of Palestinians living under Israeli military administration.

In May 2024, upon receiving the Israel Prize, he called on the Israeli government to recognize the limits of military power and to do everything possible to secure the release of the hostages in Gaza.

He donated his Israel Prize money in physics to the "Rabbis for Human Rights" association and to the "Yom Kippur War '73 Veterans" association.

== Awards and Honors ==
- Weizmann Prize for Research in the Exact Sciences, from the Tel Aviv-Yafo Municipality, 2009.
- Lecar Prize for exoplanet research, from the Harvard-Smithsonian Center for Astrophysics, 2015
- Fellow of the Israel Physical Society, 2020
- The Israel Prize in physics, 2024.

== Books ==
- Drishat Shalom ("Seeking Peace"): sermons on the Torah in the spirit of peace and justice, edited by Pinchas Leiser and Tsevi Mazeh, 2010, Yedioth Books
- Introduction to the Theory of Special Relativity, Paradox Publishing, 2006; Magnes, 2025
- On the Revolutions of the Heavenly Spheres: The Unfolding of the Copernican Revolution, Magnes Press, 2021 (ISBN 9789657790229)
- On the Revolution of the Heavenly Spheres: Copernicus and the Making of Modern Cosmology, Magnes, 2026
