= Menachem Amir =

Israeli criminologist (1930–2015)

- מנחם אמיר
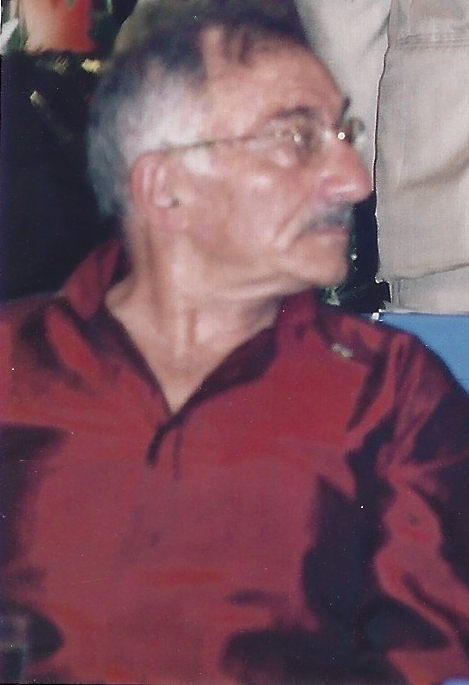
- Amir pictured in 2003, receiving the Israel Prize
- Born: July 20, 1930
- Died: May 21, 2015 (aged 84)
- Known for: Pioneer sociological study on the phenomenon of rape, characterizing rapists as psychologically normal; seminal work on victim-precipitated forcible rape.
- Title: Benjamin Berger Chair Professor of Criminology
- Spouse: Dr. Delilah Amir
- Children: Orly, Gili
- Awards: Israel Prize (2003)

Academic work
- Discipline: Criminology
- Institutions: Hebrew University of Jerusalem
- Notable works: Patterns in Forcible Rape (1971) "Victim Precipitated Forcible Rape" (1968)

Menachem Amir (Hebrew: מנחם אמיר; 20 July 1930 – 21 May 2015) was an Israeli criminologist. He spent most of his career as a professor at the Hebrew University of Jerusalem, where he was the Benjamin Berger Chair Professor of Criminology until he retired in 1999. Amir received the Israel Prize from the Israeli government in 2003 for his work, one of the first two criminologists to do so alongside Shlomo Giora Shoham. He received his BA in sociology and education from the Hebrew University of Jerusalem, his MA in sociology and psychology from the same institution, and his PhD in criminology from the University of Pennsylvania.

== Work ==
Amir is best-known for his work on rape, including his article "Victim Precipitated Forcible Rape" (1968), and his first book Patterns in Forcible Rape (1971). His work was the first sociological study on the phenomenon of rape. Patterns in Forcible Rape, a study of rape cases in Philadelphia, Pennsylvania, between 1958 and 1960, is notable in characterizing rapists as psychologically normal. According to a contemporary review by Albert J. Reiss, a sociologist at Yale University, Patterns in Forcible Rape assembled more "information on forcible-rape victims and their alleged offenders" than any previous study on the subject.

Some American feminists utilized Amir's work in their anti-rape activism.

Amir also worked on topics concerning juvenile delinquents, elderly victims of crime, and international organized crime.

== Personal life and death ==
Menachem Amir was married to Dr. Delilah Amir, a sociologist at Tel Aviv University. They had two children, Orly and Gili. He died on 21 May 2015, at the age of 84.
