= Moshe M. Barash =

American engineer and academic

Moshe, Barash M.
- Scientific career
- Fields: Industrial Engineering and Manufacturing
- Institutions: Purdue University and University of Manchester
- Notable students: Abhijit Deshmukh

Moshe M. Barash was the Ransburg Professor of Manufacturing and Professor of Industrial Engineering at Purdue University. He received his B.Sc. and Dipl.Ing. degrees in electrical engineering at the Technion, Israel Institute of Technology, Haifa, and his Ph.D. degree in mechanical engineering at the University of Manchester, England. He published numerous research and technical papers in design, manufacturing systems, automatic planning and many other areas.
