= Shlomo Giora Shoham =

Israeli criminologist (born 1929)

- שלמה גיורא שוהם
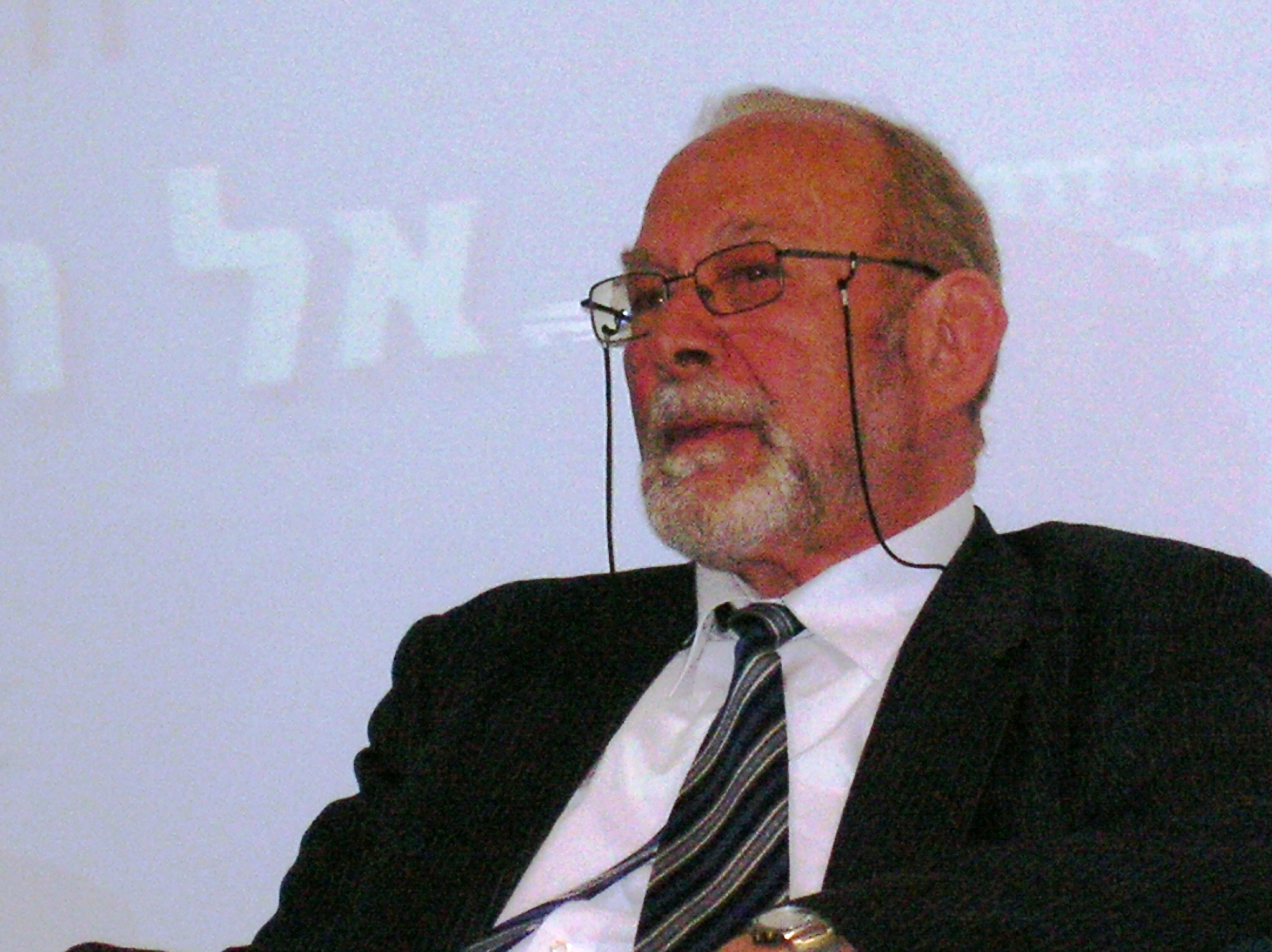
- Born: 1929; Lithuania
- Education: Hebrew University of Jerusalem (JD, PhD); University of Cambridge (Criminology)
- Occupations: Criminologist, Academic
- Notable work: The Mark of Cain, Valhalla, Calvary and Auschwitz
- Awards: Israel Prize (2003)

Academic work
- Discipline: Criminology
- Institutions: Bar-Ilan University; Tel Aviv University

Shlomo Giora Shoham (Hebrew: שלמה גיורא שוהם) received the Israel Prize in the category of Criminology Research in 2003, one of the first two criminologists to do so along with Menachem Amir.

== Personal information ==
Shlomo Shoham was born in Lithuania in 1929 and immigrated to Israel in 1935. He is married and had a son and daughter, the former was killed in the Yom Kippur War. Following his son’s death he added Giora (his son's name) to his name.

== Israel’s wars ==
Shoham fought in the 1947–1949 Palestine war in the Neve Daniel Gush Etzion Convoy that was called upon to provide assistance for the Gush Etzion Bloc which ultimately surrendered, resulting in his capture by the Jordanians.

== Education ==
Shoham was in the first class from the Faculty of Law at the Hebrew University of Jerusalem to graduate for both his Juris Doctor (JD) and PhD. He also studied Criminology at Cambridge University.

A doctoral thesis by Jean Motte dit Falisse from the Catholic University of Louvain was written about him, entitled, ‘Loi religieuse et loi morale dans la tradition juive : contribution à l’étude de la personnalité morale de délinquants juvéniles selon la théorie mytho-empirique de S.G. Shoham’. There was also a lecture series on him by Mark Seis in 1990.

== Academic foundations ==
Shoham founded Bar-Ilan University’s Institute of Criminology. Ten years later he founded Tel Aviv University’s Department of Criminology.

== Academic appointments ==
Shoham is a teacher and scholar at the Faculty of Law in Tel Aviv University. In the past he held a wide variety of roles including: Assistant District Attorney of Jerusalem, assistant to Israel’s attorney general, a co-representative of Israel at the International Congress of Comparative Law, the Denis Carrol International Award Representative for Israel held at the meeting of the directors of Criminological Research Institutes at Council of Europe. In 1985 he was Harvard University’s Center for Jewish Studies’ visiting scholar.

== Research ==
Working with Professor Yehuda Fried, Shoham has put together a technique to treat drug addicts, investigating social deviance, detailing a unique personality theory to comprehend crime and deviation. He has published books on this, the most notable of one which was translated into many languages: The Mark of Cain.

Shoham also refined a micro-macro theory of criminology, expressed through his book Valhalla, Calvary and Auschwitz, proving a macro-criminological perspective can be applied to explain the Nazi movement and using a macro-victimological thesis, the Holocaust can be better comprehended.

== Memberships ==
Shoham is on the Cohen Committee (that deals with penal methods and criminological research). Previously, he was a member of the Australian Society of Forensic Sciences. He was elected to the board of directors of the International Society of Criminology and a Member of the Scientific Commission at the International Center of Sociological, Penal and Penitentiary Research, in Italy in 1981. He was a member of the Scientific Advisory Board, Institute of Criminology and Penology and Penitentiary Research and Studies. He sat on the Board of Directors at the Directors Research Committee for the Sociology of Deviance and Social Control. He was also a member of the research committee at the International Sociological Association Louvain, University, Belgium.

He held the role of chairman at the International Sociological Association. He was on the committee for the Classification of Prisoners in Israel. He was vice president on the Research Committee on Alienation, at the International Sociological Association.

== Awards ==
In 1975 he was the Israel recipient of the Presidential Citation for “outstanding achievement in the field of criminology” from the American Society of Criminology. Two years later he received the Sellin-Glueck Award from the American Society of Criminology. He received a Medal of Honor presented from the French prime minister for his contribution in the field of international criminology. In 1991 he received the Annual Award of the World Society of Legal Medicine, for Significant Scientific Contribution. Shoham received the Israel Prize in 2003. In 2007 he was awarded the EMET Prize, the jury statement for this award reads: “Prof. Shlomo Giora Shoham is awarded the Emet Prize for his contribution to the formulation of original and profound ideas in varied fields of criminology and penal theory, and for setting himself the goal of developing criminology as a scientific socio-legal branch. He was one of the pioneers and path-finders in Israel in teaching and research of the field, including the founding of institutes of criminology and criminal law at the Bar-Ilan and Tel Aviv universities."

== Books ==
Shoham has written many books by a slew of different publishers. Here is a list of some of the most recent ones.

Title	Publisher	Year
Art, Crime and Madness: Gesualdo, Caravaggio, Genet Van Gogh, Artaud	Sussex Academy Press	2002
The Mytho-Empiricism of Gnosticism: Triumph of the Vanquished	Sussex Academy Press	2003
Art in the Authentic Domain	Cambridge Scholars Publishing	2006
Art, Myth and Deviance	Cambridge Scholars Publishing	2006
International Handbook of Penology & Criminal Justice	CRC Press	2007
World of Light	Cambridge Scholars Publishing	2009
Future Intelligence	Bertelsmann Foundation	2010
International Handbook of Victimology	CRC Press	2010
International Handbook of Criminology	CRC Press	2010
The Insatiable Gorge: An Existential View of Opiate Addiction and its Treatment	de Sitter Publications	2010
To Test the Limits of Our Endurance	Cambridge Scholars Publishing	2010
Glory & Agony: Isaac’s Sacrifice and National Narrative	Stanford University Press	2010
The Genesis of Genesis: The Myth-empiricism of Creation	Cambridge Scholars Publishing	2011
Torah! Torah! The Intimate Diary of Rabban Yochanan Ben-Zakkai	de Sitter Publications	2011
Jojo: The Healing Dialogue	de Sitter Publications	2011
The Smarter Bomb: Women and Children as Suicide Bombers	Rowman & Littlefield Publishers	2011
Policing and Preventing Terrorism around the Globe	de Sitter Publications	2012
The Measure of All Things: Anthropology	Cambridge Scholars Publishing	2013
Moses: The Righteous Sky Gazer	Cambridge Scholars Publishing	2014
