= Exact sciences =

Sciences that admit of absolute precision in their results

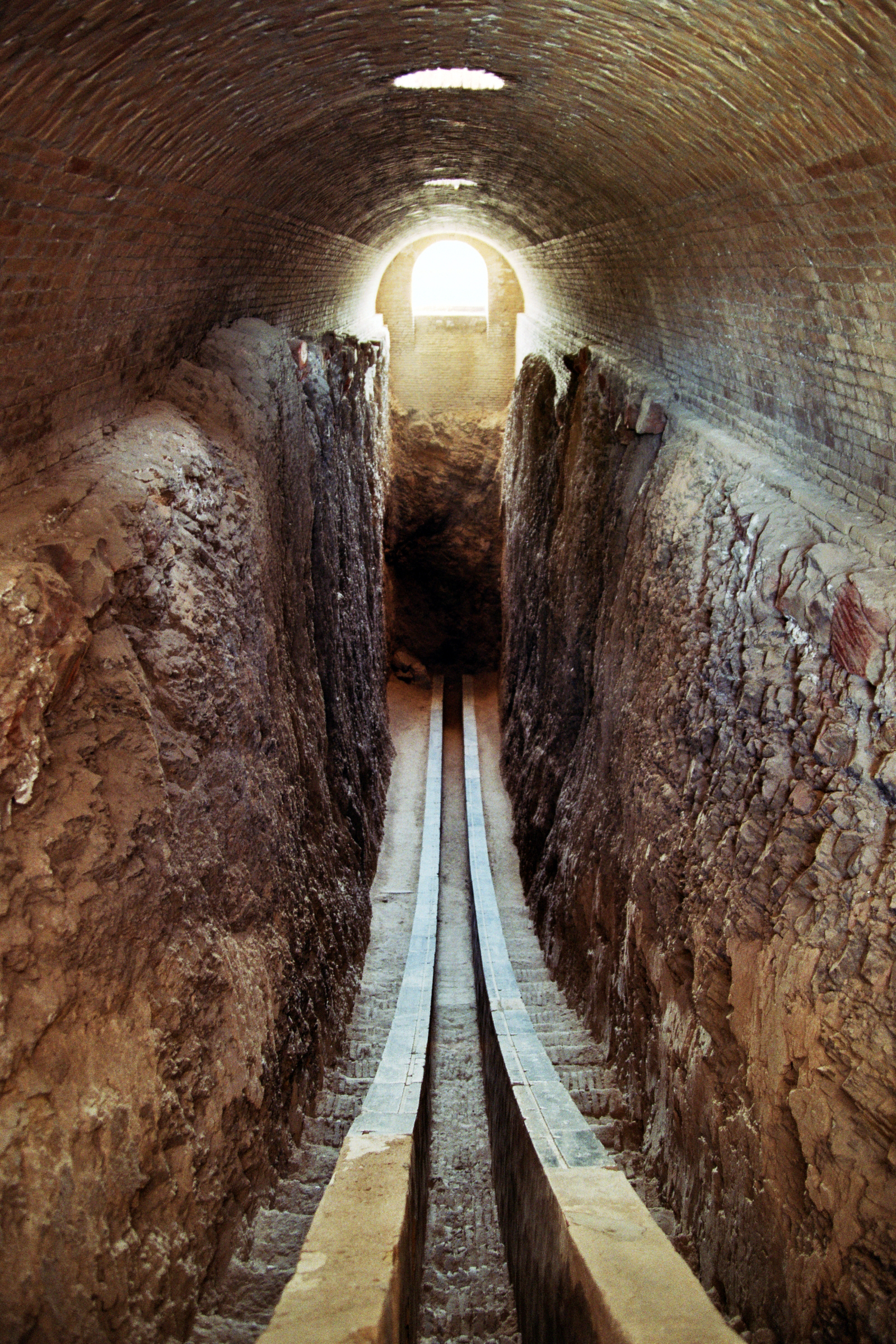
Ulugh Beg's meridian arc for precise astronomical measurements (15th c.)

The exact sciences or quantitative sciences, sometimes called the exact mathematical sciences, are those sciences "which admit of absolute precision in their results"; especially the mathematical sciences. Examples of the exact sciences are mathematics, optics, astronomy, and physics, which many philosophers from René Descartes, Gottfried Leibniz, and Immanuel Kant to the logical positivists took as paradigms of rational and objective knowledge. These sciences have been practiced in many cultures from antiquity to modern times. Given their ties to mathematics, the exact sciences are characterized by accurate quantitative expression, precise predictions and/or rigorous methods of testing hypotheses involving quantifiable predictions and measurements.

The distinction between the quantitative exact sciences and those sciences that deal with the causes of things is due to Aristotle, who distinguished mathematics from natural philosophy and considered the exact sciences to be the "more natural of the branches of mathematics." Thomas Aquinas employed this distinction when he said that astronomy explains the spherical shape of the Earth by mathematical reasoning while physics explains it by material causes. This distinction was widely, but not universally, accepted until the Scientific Revolution of the 17th century. Edward Grant has proposed that a fundamental change leading to the new sciences was the unification of the exact sciences and physics by Johannes Kepler, Isaac Newton, and others, which resulted in a quantitative investigation of the physical causes of natural phenomena.

== See also ==
- Hard and soft science
- Fundamental science
- Demarcation problem
