= Mishael Zion =

Israeli rabbi

- Born: 1981 (age 44–45); Jerusalem, Israel
- Occupations: Rabbi, author, educator
- Notable work: Halayla Hazeh: The Israeli Haggadah, A Night to Remember Haggadah

Mishael Zion (Hebrew: מישאל ציון; born 1981, Jerusalem, Israel) is an Israeli rabbi, author, and educator. He is a faculty member at the Mandel Leadership Institute and was founding director of its Program for Leadership in Jewish Culture. He has served as a faculty member of the Shalom Hartman Institute and as co-director of the Bronfman Fellowship. He is also a founder of Kehillat Klausner, a partnership minyan in the Talpiot-Arnona neighborhood of Jerusalem.

Zion is the author of Esther: A New Israeli Commentary (2019) and co-author, with his father Noam Zion, of Halaila Hazeh: An Israeli Haggadah (2004) and a Night to Remember: The Haggadah of Contemporary Voices (2007), as well as other publications.

In 2013 he was listed as one of ten "Rabbis to Watch" by The Daily Beast.

He was featured as one of the one hundred people portrayed in the 2025 book Hinenu:Israel at Ten Million intended to capture the diverse demographics in Israel upon reaching the milestone of ten million population.

== Early life and education ==
Mishael Zion was born in Jerusalem, Israel to Marcelle and Noam Sachs Zion. He studied at Yeshivat Maaleh Gilboa and Yeshivat Chovevei Torah, where he received his rabbinic ordination in 2011. Zion received a bachelor's degree from the department of anthropology and sociology of Hebrew University in Jerusalem in 2008 and a master's degree in Jewish history from Tel Aviv University in 2024. He is also a 2016 graduate of the Beit Midrash for Israeli Rabbis (Rabbanut Yisraelit).

He was a visiting scholar at University of California, Berkeley and a research fellow at the Tikvah Center for Law & Jewish Civilization at NYU School of Law.

== Career ==
Zion worked as an educator and served as co-director and rabbi of the Bronfman Youth Fellowship, now known as The Bronfman Fellowship.

Zion is currently the director of the Program for Leadership in Israeli Culture at the Mandel Leadership Institute in Jerusalem, which focuses on leadership development in culture, community education and media.

Zion has also taught at the Shalom Hartman Institute programs in both Israel and North America.

He has lectured and written on Jewish thought and identity, Israeli culture and contemporary religious life in schools, newspapers, radio, podcasts and blogs.

== Community involvement ==
Zion is one of the founders and leaders of the Klausner Minyan (Hebrew: מניין קלוזנר), a partnership minyan in the Talpiot-Arnona neighborhood of Jerusalem. It is one of a growing number of Orthodox egalitarian minyanim seeking to expand women's participation in prayer and Torah reading.

Zion is also involved in pastoral and other community efforts in his neighborhood.

Zion is a founding faculty member of Rikmah, the Yeshivat Chovevei Torah Beit Midrash for Rabbinic Leadership in Israel, set up to support professional rabbis and rabbaniyot-serving communities and schools in Israel.

== Published works ==
Zion’s first major publications were produced with his father Noam Sachs Zion. The Passover Haggadah, Halayla Hazeh: The Israeli Haggadah, (in Hebrew) integrates contemporary Israeli material into the Seder and provides a guide for discussions at the Seder table. An English version A Night to Remember: The Haggadah of Contemporary Voices was published in 2007. In 2024, twenty years after its initial release, a new edition was published. It included reflections and readings about the October 7 attacks, framing the Passover themes of suffering and redemption within the context of contemporary national trauma and resilience.

In 2019 Zion published Esther: A New Israeli Commentary, a contemporary interpretation of the Book of Esther, examining its influence on Israeli culture, art, and imagination. It is part of the "New Israel commentary" series published by the Avi Chai Foundation and edited by Avigdor Shinan, designed to provide an Israeli-focused interpretation of books of the Bible.

He also published Eighteen Talmudic Stories Every Jew Should Know', a digital anthology produced in collaboration with Sefaria and the Bronfman Fellowship (2018). The project presents classic Talmudic narratives in multimedia formats, including video introductions and sheets.

In 2024 he edited the book I Promise You, in Hebrew, a compilation of essays by Israeli cultural leaders presented as part of a conference run by the Mandel Leadership Institute. The book highlights reflections on the role of Israeli children's culture during war and especially in light of the October 7 events and offers suggestions for parents and teachers on how to talk to children about the war.

== Articles and lectures ==
- A Thanksgivukkah Manifesto, HUFFPOST, Nov 2013
- What kind of religious Jew am I? The Rachel and Jon kind, Times of Israel, Sept 2024
- Five Big Hartman Ideas, Times of Israel 2013
- From Mourning to Resilience: Community Rabbis Face Israel at War
- "Singing Leonard Cohen on Yom Kippur"
