= Center for Initiatives in Jewish Education =

The Center for Initiatives in Jewish Education (CIJE) was granted funding to give guidance and assistance to Jewish educational institutions. The organization's present focus is on STEM and they operate their own science competitions for students in co-ed schools, Orthodox all-boys schools, and all-girls schools. Their most recent multi-school STEM competition (December 2019) expanded, reaching down to the middle-school level.

The multi-organization task force from which CIJE was initiated had as their driving focus, according to their 1990 report, to go beyond the single-gender schools, and reach out to "the segment of the Jewish population which is finding it increasingly difficult to define its future in terms of Jewish values and behavior."

The way their work contrasts with that of Torah Umesorah – National Society for Hebrew Day Schools, another non-profit organization, was described as "from life back to the Torah.”

== History ==
=== Commission on Jewish Education in North America ===
The Commission on Jewish Education in North America, a newly formed group, "met six times .. from August 1, 1988 to June 12, 1990" and appointed a director to "a new entity, the Council for Initiatives in Jewish Education (CIJE)."

=== Council for Initiatives in Jewish Education ===
The Council for Initiatives in Jewish Education was the first of two organizations to use the initials CJIE. Its director, Alan David Hoffmann, one of the 24 individuals providing "individual consultations" to the commission, served from 1994 to 1996. It scheduled annual review meetings, while seeking to enhance the outcome from the "some estimates say 30,000" involved in Jewish education in North America.

=== Center for Initiatives in Jewish Education ===
The Center for Initiatives in Jewish Education (CIJE) was formed in 2001, as a New York-based followup to the first CIJE. Unlike the earlier organization (which, after much analysis, was seeking to focus on "three to five model communities"), this organization has a much larger focus. In 2015 it opened its CIJE-Tech Middle School Program as a "groundbreaking ... across the denominational spectrum in more than 180 schools nationwide" effort "to promote inquiry and project-based thinking, and curiosity." The goal, however, still remains from the first CIJE: "new personnel .. new programs .. teaching of Hebrew, the Bible, and Jewish history."

Providing lab equipment is a part of the CIJE program.

==== Innovation Day ====
Innovation Day is a CIJE program that began in 2013, in which students from North American Jewish high schools present competing innovations within six categories. More than one location hosts competing students. The largest for 2019 was in Holmdel, NJ (over 1,000 students from the Northeast); the Boca Raton, Florida site was for "eight South Florida Jewish day schools." Both 2019 events were on May 1.

== Effectiveness ==
The original report's listed goal was to involve "all sectors of the Jewish community." It was multi-dimensional: stream/denominations, roles, and lastly Jewish organizations and foundations.

As of 2010, it was noted that most Jewish children receive (and will continue to receive) "Jewish education in supplementary settings" rather than in day schools. Additionally, programs of a similar nature, though less time-intense were developed, including Birthright Israel (a 10-day program) and several summer-camp programs.

A 2019 report by Avi Chai Foundation indicated ongoing participation by boys and girls at schools identified as Orthodox, Conservative and Reform, covering "16 states" (albeit largely from the Northeast, Florida and Texas).

One criticism of many programs is instructor turnover, especially in non-Orthodox schools, where an estimated 25% of those teaching are in their first year.

== See also ==
- Avi Chai Foundation
