= Yair Zakovitch =

Israeli schollar

- יאיר זקוביץ
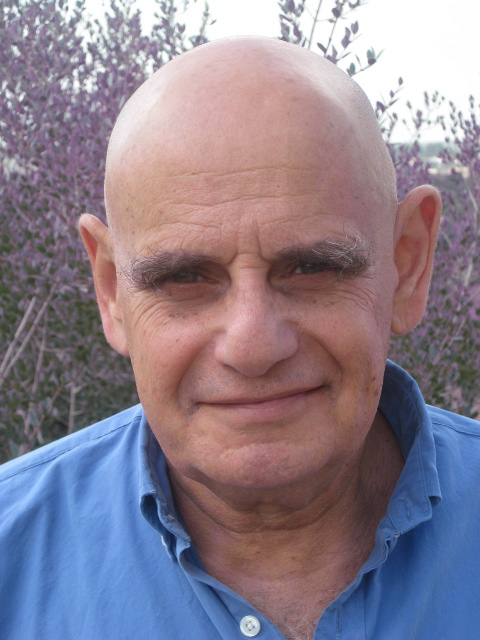
- Born: 1945 (age 80–81); Haifa, Mandatory Palestine
- Education: Hebrew University of Jerusalem (professor emeritus)
- Known for: Biblical Research, Israeli Prize winner

Yair Zakovitch (born in 1945) is a biblical scholar and professor emeritus in the Department of Bible at the Hebrew University of Jerusalem. He is the Israel Prize winner for his achievements in Biblical Studies for the year 2021.

== Biography ==
Yair Zakovitch grew up in Haifa, the son of a Haifa port worker. He completed his undergraduate studies at the University of Haifa, received his Master's degree from the Hebrew University of Jerusalem in 1972, and in 1978, he completed his doctoral dissertation at the Hebrew University on the topic "On Three and Four: The Literary Pattern of Three-Four in the Bible."

His research fields and publications include literary reading, intra-biblical interpretation, and beliefs and opinions in the Bible, as well as the relationship between post-biblical literature (Second Temple period, rabbinic literature, and early Christianity) and the Bible.

In his research, Zakovitch explores hidden polemics in biblical stories and echoes of ancient traditions that were excluded from the canon. Among other things, Zakovitch believes in two interpretative doctrines for uncovering early traditions: the "Law of Center and Periphery", how marginalized traditions can be traced in less prominent biblical narratives, and the "Safety Valve", the inclusion of alternative perspectives while maintaining the dominant narrative.

Zakovitch served as head of the Bible Department from 1987 to 1989, head of the Mandel Institute for Jewish Studies from 1995 to 1997, and Dean of the Faculty of Humanities at the Hebrew University from 1997 to 2001. He also chaired the Bible Studies Committee at the Ministry of Education from 1981 to 1984 and again from 2003 to 2011.

Zakovitch is one of the initiators and founders (with Alan David Hoffmann) of the "Revivim" (Hebrew: רְבִיבִים, lit. '(rain) showers') program for training teachers to teach Jewish Studies. He has served as a visiting lecturer at the University of Pennsylvania, the University of California, Berkeley, the Jewish Theological Seminary of America (JTS), and Harvard University. He is a recipient of the Israel Prize for Biblical Studies for the year 2021, a Fellow at the Open University, and an honorary Doctor of Divinity from the Jewish Theological Seminary of America.

He resides in Givat Yeshayahu, Israel.

== Books ==
- Zakovitch, Yair (1979). Al shlosha... ve'al arbaa [On Three... and On Four] (in Hebrew). Mekor Publishing.
- Zakovitch, Yair (1982). The Life of Samson: Judges 13–16 – A Critical Literary Analysis [Ḥayye Shimshon: Shoftim 13–16 – Nitu'aḥ sifruti bikkorti] (in Hebrew). Magnes Press. ISBN 9789652234117.
- Zakovitch, Yair; Shinan, Avigdor (1992). Sefer Bereishit ba-Miqra, ba-Tirgumim ha-Atiqim u-veSifrut ha-Yehudit ha-Kedumah [The Book of Genesis in the Bible, in Ancient Translations, and in Early Jewish Literature] (in Hebrew).
- Zakovitch, Yair (1985). Gavah me'al gavah – Nitu'aḥ sifruti shel Melakhim Bet perek 5 [Height Upon Height: A Literary Analysis of 2 Kings Chapter 5] (in Hebrew). Am Oved.
- Zakovitch, Yair (1987). Al tafisat ha-nes ba-Miqra [On the Concept of the Miracle in the Bible] (in Hebrew). Ministry of Defense Publishing.
- Zakovitch, Yair (1990). Rut, im mavo u-perush [Ruth, with Introduction and Commentary] (in Hebrew). Magnes Press.
- Zakovitch, Yair (1992). Mavo le-farshanut panim miqrait [Introduction to Inner-Biblical Interpretation] (in Hebrew). Rekhes. ISBN 9780802803887.
- Zakovitch, Yair (1992). Shir ha-Shirim, im mavo u-perush [Song of Songs, with Introduction and Commentary] (in Hebrew). Am Oved.
- Zakovitch, Yair; Galil, Gershon (1994). Yehoshua [Joshua]. Olam ha-Tanakh (in Hebrew). Tel Aviv.
- Zakovitch, Yair (1995). Miqra'ot be-Eretz ha-Mar'ot [Scriptures in the House of Mirrors] (in Hebrew). Hakibbutz Hameuchad.
- Zakovitch, Yair (1995). David: me-ro'eh le-mashiaḥ [David: From a Shepherd to a Messiah] (in Hebrew). Yad Izhak Ben-Zvi.
- Zakovitch, Yair (1998). Ki ha-adam yir'eh la-eynayim, ve-Adonai yir'eh la-levav ["For Man Sees with the Eyes, but the Lord Sees into the Heart": On Disguise and Recompense in Biblical Stories] (in Hebrew). Academon.
- Zakovitch, Yair (1998). Ke-afikim ba-Negev [Like Streams in the Negev] (in Hebrew). Office of the President.
- Zakovitch, Yair (2004). Mashmi'a shalom mevaser tov ["Proclaimer of Peace, Bringer of Good Tidings": Seven Visions of Peace for Jerusalem] (in Hebrew). University of Haifa.
- Zakovitch, Yair; Shinan, Avigdor (2004). Lo kakh katuv ba-Tanakh [That's Not What the Bible Says] (in Hebrew). Miskal.
- Zakovitch, Yair (2005). Avi'a ḥidot mi-yemei qedem ["I Will Utter Dark Sayings of Old": Riddles and Dreams – The Riddle in Biblical Narrative] (in Hebrew). Am Oved.
- Zakovitch, Yair (2007). Yeshu kore ba-Sifrei ha-Besorah [Jesus Reads from the Gospels] (in Hebrew). Am Oved.
- Zakovitch, Yair; Shinan, Avigdor (2009). Gam kakh lo katuv ba-Tanakh [That's Also Not What the Bible Says] (in Hebrew). Miskal.
- Zakovitch, Yair (2009). Tzvat be-tzvat asuyah: mah bein midrash panim-miqra'i le-midrash ḥutz-miqra'i [Tongs Made with Tongs: Inner-Biblical and Extra-Biblical Midrash] (in Hebrew). Am Oved.
- Zakovitch, Yair (2010). Ha-sefer ha-qaton al teva ha-malakim [The Little Book on the Nature of Angels] (in Hebrew). Kinneret Zmora-Bitan Dvir.
- Zakovitch, Yair (2012). Ya'akov: ha-sippur ha-mafli'a shel avi ha-uma [Jacob: The Surprising Story of the Father of a Nation] (in Hebrew). Dvir.
- Zakovitch, Yair (2013). Ha-mesharet [The Servant] (in Hebrew). Carmel.
- Zakovitch, Yair (2014). Ha-milon ha-miqra'i ha-samuy min ha-ayin [The Hidden Biblical Dictionary] (in Hebrew). Carmel.
- Zakovitch, Yair; Ruzer, Serge (2014). Bereshit haya ha-davar: shmoneh siḥot al ha-Besorah ha-Revi'it [In the Beginning Was the Word: Eight Conversations on the Gospel of John] (in Hebrew). Magnes Press.
- Zakovitch, Yair; Shinan, Avigdor (2015). Sefer Yonah – perush Yisra'eli ḥadash [The Book of Jonah – A New Israeli Commentary] (in Hebrew). Yedioth Sfarim.
- Zakovitch, Yair (2015). Yaldut be-Ginat Eden (Tashah–Tashi'a) [Childhood in the Garden of Eden (1945–1951)] (in Hebrew). Carmel.
- Zakovitch, Yair; Ruzer, Serge (2016). Ki devar ha-Elohim ḥai hu: shmoneh siḥot al ha-iggeret el ha-Ivri'im [For the Word of God is Living: Eight Conversations on the Epistle to the Hebrews] (in Hebrew). Magnes Press.
- Zakovitch, Yair; Shinan, Avigdor (2017). Megillat Eikhah – perush Yisra'eli ḥadash [Lamentations – A New Israeli Commentary] (in Hebrew). Yedioth Sfarim.
- Zakovitch, Yair; Shinan, Avigdor (2019). Megillat Shir ha-Shirim – perush Yisra'eli ḥadash [Song of Songs – A New Israeli Commentary] (in Hebrew). Yedioth Sfarim.
- Zakovitch, Yair (2019). Ha-Tanakh: Mahapeikhat Elohim [The Bible: The Divine Revolution] (in Hebrew). Magnes Press.
- Zakovitch, Yair (1991). The Concept of the Miracle in the Bible. MOD Books. ISBN 9789650505493.
- Zakovitch, Yair (1991). "And You Shall Tell Your Son": The Concept of the Exodus in the Bible. Magnes Press. ISBN 9789652237804.
- Zakovitch, Yair (1992). "Das Buch Rut. Ein jüdischer Kommentar" [The Book of Ruth - A Jewish commentary]. Stuttgarter Bibel-Studien (in German) (177). Stuttgart.
- Zakovitch, Yair (2004). Das Hohe Lied [Song of Songs]. Herders Theologisches Kommentar zum Alten Testament (in German). Freiburg: Verlag Herder. ISBN 9783451268304.
- Zakovitch, Yair; Shinan, Avigdor (2012). From Gods to God: How the Bible Debunked, Suppressed, or Changed Ancient Myths and Legends. Jewish Publication Society and University of Nebraska Press. ISBN 9780827609082.
- Zakovitch, Yair (2012). Jacob: Unexpected Patriarch. Yale University Press. ISBN 9780300144260.

== Articles ==
- "The Sun Stood Still at Gibeon: The Evolution of a Miracle" (שמש בגבעון דום: גלגוליו של נס), in: Gal Weinstein: The Sun Stood Still at Gibeon, ed. Tami Katz-Freiman, The Israeli Pavilion, Venice Biennale, 2017, pp. 144–148.
- "Concrete Metaphors and Metaphorical Language in Biblical Interpretation—Internal and External" (קונקרטיזציה של מטפורות ולשון מטפורית בפרשנות המקרא - פנימית וחיצונית), Shnaton: An Annual for Biblical and Ancient Near Eastern Studies 24 (2016), pp. 5–55.
- "'A Thousand Shall Be Yours, Solomon' (Song 8:12): On the Tradition of Solomon's Thousand Wives" (האלף לך שלמה...), in: Shemut Ve-Ruach: Festschrift for Avraham Shapira, eds. A. Zakai, P. Mendes-Flohr, Z. Gries, Jerusalem 2015, pp. 255–263.
- "My Son, My Son Absalom – A Father's Lament, Not a King's" (בני, בני אבשלום – קינת אב ולא קינת מלך), in: Lev Avot al Banim, eds. Y. Shaviv and B. Offen, Alon Shvut 2014, pp. 252–259.
- "On Plagues, Miracles, Angels, and the Immunity of Jerusalem" (על מגפות, ניסים, מלאכים וחסינות ירושלים), in: Jerusalem – Medical File, ed. N. Shalev-Kalifa, Jerusalem 2014, pp. 29–36.
- "On Four Sick Kings in Jerusalem" (על ארבעה מלכים חולים בירושלים), same vol., pp. 51–56.
- "On Borders and Crossing Them" (על גבולות וחצייתם), in: L. Ramon, Through the Window She Gazed (with A. Shinan), Tel Aviv: Hakibbutz Hameuchad, 2012, pp. 11–23.
- Roundtable Contribution: "Are We Still the People of the Book?" (האם אנחנו עדיין עם הספר?), Zehuyot, Issue 1 (2012), pp. 102–106.
- "The Legion Among the Swine – Bible, Midrash, and Allegory (Matt. 8:28–34; Mark 5:1–20; Luke 8:26–39)" (לגיון הזרים בעדרי חזירים...), in: Like a Dream and a Dybbuk – On Dreams and Possession, eds. R. Elior, Y. Bilu, Y. Zakovitch, A. Shinan, Jerusalem: Magnes, 2013, pp. 235–256.
- "Three 'Who Is This?' Questions in Song of Songs" (על שלוש שאלות 'מי זאת' בשיר השירים), in: Merakim: Culture, Literature, Folklore, eds. H. Salomon and A. Shinan, Jerusalem 2013, pp. 33–40.
- "Psalm 135 – A Mosaic of Verses, Its Meaning and Intent" (תהלים קלה – פסיפס כתובים), in: Zer Rimonim, eds. M. Avioz, A. Asis, Y. Shemesh, Atlanta 2013, pp. 286–296.
- "Inner-Biblical Interpretation" (פרשנות פנים מקראית), in: Biblical Literature: Introductions and Studies, ed. Z. Talshir, Vol. I, Jerusalem 2011, pp. 429–453.
- "From Crisis to Correction: Return to Eden in Isa 51:1–3" (משבר לתיקון: השיבה לגן ה'), in: Fracture and Repair, eds. A. Shinan, A. Bilski, Jerusalem 2010, pp. 28–34.
- "Is the Tree of Knowledge the Tree of Life?" (עץ הדעת הוא עץ החיים?), in: Paradise of Old, ed. R. Elior, Jerusalem 2010, pp. 63–70.
- "The Exodus as the Big Bang – A Reading of Psalm 114" (יציאת מצרים המפץ הגדול), in: Sefer Michael, ed. A. Sagi, Jerusalem–Even Yehuda 2008, pp. 81–96.
- "Woman (in the Bible)" (אישה במקרא), in: Zman Yehudi Hadash, Vol. I, Jerusalem 2007, pp. 174–178.
- "Bread of Miracle and Wonder" (לחם נס ופלא), with A. Shinan, in: Bread in the Religions and Communities of Israel, ed. N. Ben-Yosef, Israel Museum, Jerusalem 2006, pp. 29–45.
- "The Book of Moses in the Book of David" (ספר משה בספר דוד), in: Moses: Father of the Prophets, eds. M. Halamish, H. Kasher, H. Ben-Pazi, Ramat Gan 2011, pp. 45–52.
- "On the D–Ts Interchange in Biblical Hebrew" (על חילופי ד-צ בלשון המקרא), in: Festschrift for Avi Hurvitz, Jerusalem 2009, pp. 113–120.
- "'I' and 'We' in the Psalms" (אנכי ואנחנו בשירת תהלים), in: On the Individual and the Collective, eds. A. Bilski et al., Tel Aviv 2007, pp. 46–51.
- "Hints, Allusions, and Textual Criticism" (רומזים, נרמזים וביקורת הנוסח), in: Festschrift for Sarah Japhet, eds. M. Bar-Asher et al., Jerusalem 2008, pp. 323–331.
- "Midrashic Interpretations of the Name Zion – From Ruin to Redemption" (מדרשי השם ציון), in: Eretz-Israel 28 (Teddy Kollek Volume), Jerusalem 2008, pp. 203–208.
- "Basic Law and Its Foundations – Basic Law: Israel Lands" (חוק-יסוד ויסודותיו), in: Shoreshim ba-Mishpat, ed. D. Zilber, Nevo, 2020, pp. 151–[end] (with Orit Koteb).
- "In the Looking for Closeness to God", in: A. Brenninkmeijer-Werhahn (ed.), Marriage – Constancy and Change in Togetherness, Symposion vol. 15, Vienna 2017, pp. 156–169.
- "Do the Last Verses of Malachi (Mal 3:22–24) Have a Canonical Function? A Biblical Puzzle", in: E. Di Pede & D. Scaiola (eds.), The Book of the Twelve – One Book or Many?, Tübingen 2016, pp. 60–81.
- "Keep Your Thousand, Solomon! (Song 8:12): A History of the Tradition of Solomon's Thousand Wives", in: S. M. Attard & M. Pavan (eds.), Studi in onore del prof. Gianni Barbiero, Rome: Gregorian and Biblical Press, 2015, pp. 359–370.
- "Why Is 'A' Placed Next to 'B'? Juxtaposition in the Bible and Beyond", in: M. Kister et al. (eds.), Tradition, Transmission, and Transformation, Leiden 2015, pp. 322–342 (with A. Shinan).
- "Reading Biblical Narrative", in: The Jewish Study Bible, 2nd ed., eds. A. Berlin & M.Z. Brettler, Oxford University Press, 2014, pp. 2191–2201.
- "On the Ordering of Psalms as Demonstrated by Psalms 136–150", in: The Oxford Handbook of the Psalms, ed. W.P. Brown, Oxford University Press, 2014, pp. 214–228.
- "The Bible's Hidden Dictionary: The Example of Psalms", in: A. Grund et al. (eds.), Ich will dir danken unter den Völkern, Gütersloh: Gütersloher Verlagshaus, 2013, pp. 299–305.
- "Intermarriage and Halakhic Creativity: The Book of Ruth", INTAMS Review 19.1 (2013), pp. 56–69.
- "Inner-Biblical Interpretation", in: M. Henze (ed.), A Companion to Biblical Interpretation in Early Judaism, Grand Rapids 2012, pp. 27–63.
- "Scripture and Israeli Secular Culture – Past, Present, Future", in: B.D. Sommer (ed.), Jewish Concepts of Scripture, New York–London 2012, pp. 299–316.
- "A Woman of Valor (Prov. 31:10–31): A Conservative Response to the Song of Songs", in: D.J.A. Clines & E. van Wolde (eds.), A Critical Engagement, Sheffield 2011, pp. 401–413.
- "Ruth"; "Jonah", in: The New Oxford Annotated Bible, New York 2010, pp. 392–398, 1301–1305.
- "Inner-Biblical Interpretation", in: R. Hendel (ed.), Reading Genesis – Ten Methods, Cambridge University Press, 2010, pp. 92–118.
- "Humor and Theology or the Successful Failure of Israelite Intelligence: A Literary-Folkloric Approach to Joshua 2." In Text and Tradition: The Hebrew Bible and Folklore. Edited by Susan Niditch, page 75. Atlanta: Scholars Press, 1990.
