= David Rozenson =

Jewish cultural leader and CEO of Beit Avi Chai in Jerusalem

- דוד רוזנסון
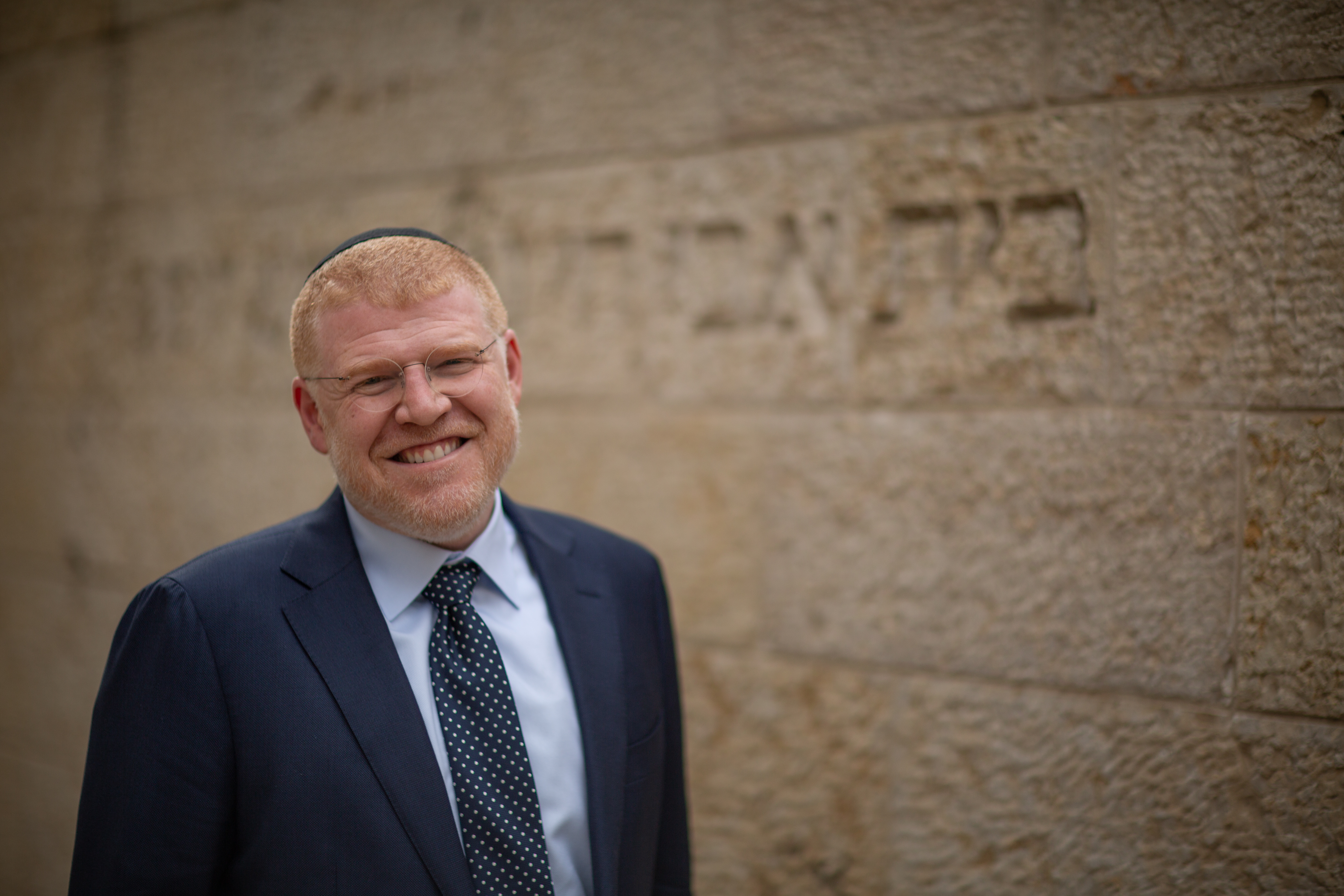
- Rozenson in 2019
- Born: October 7, 1971 (age 54); Leningrad, Soviet Union
- Occupations: Cultural and educational leader
- Known for: CEO of Beit Avi Chai; Former Director of AVI CHAI FSU
- Spouse: Jenny Rozenson
- Children: 6

David Rozenson (Russian: Давид Розенсон; Hebrew: דוד רוזנסון); born October 7, 1971) is a Jewish cultural and educational leader and literary scholar. He is recognized for his contributions to Jewish philanthropy, education, and cultural development. He was the founding executive director of the Avi Chai Foundation in the former Soviet Union and is chief executive officer of Beit Avi Chai, a cultural center in Jerusalem dedicated to exploring Jewish and Israeli culture.

== Background and Family ==
Rozenson was born in Leningrad, Soviet Union (now Saint Petersburg, Russia). In 1976, after his family applied to emigrate, his father was arrested by Soviet authorities on fabricated charges, including possession of The Black Book by Ilya Ehrenburg and Vasily Grossman. He was sentenced to two and a half years in Luga, a town with labor camps used for internal exile.

With the Jackson–Vanik amendment aiding emigration, Rozenson's father was released in 1978, and the family left the Soviet Union shortly thereafter. They temporarily sent Rozenson and his sister to relatives in Simferopol, where they went missing for two days due to a snowstorm before reuniting. The family later emigrated to the United States.

Rozenson's grandfather, Efraim Meir (Fima) Bruk, was the brother of Rabbi Eliezer Ben Zion Bruk, founder of Yeshivat Beth Yosef Novardok in Jerusalem.

== Education ==
Rozenson attended Jewish day schools in the United States and graduated summa cum laude from Yeshiva University. He received rabbinic ordination from Rabbis Chaim Brovender and Shlomo Riskin at the Straus Rabbinical Academy. He later earned a master's degree and PhD in Russian literature from the Russian State University for the Humanities (RGGU) in Moscow, focusing his dissertation on Isaac Babel.

== Career ==
=== AVI CHAI Foundation (2001–2013) ===
In the late 1990s, David Rozenson traveled frequently to the former Soviet Union to lead seminars for the Memorial Foundation for Jewish Culture and to coordinate educational programs associated with Rabbi Adin Steinsaltz's initiatives, including outreach to Jewish communities in Siberia.

Rozenson established the AVI CHAI Foundation’s operations in the former Soviet Union in 2001. Based in Moscow, he oversaw the development of Jewish education and identity initiatives, including support for Jewish day schools, Hebrew instruction, teacher training, and summer camps.

He played a key role in establishing Jewish Studies departments at Moscow State University and Saint Petersburg State University. With the academic network Sefer, he helped organize seminars and conferences, and supported the translation and publication of over 150 Jewish-themed books into Russian.

Rozenson launched the Russian-language website Booknik, the adult education initiative Eshkolot, and promoted Jewish book fairs and cultural outreach across the region.

=== Beit Avi Chai (2013–present) ===
In 2013, Rozenson became CEO of Beit Avi Chai, a Jerusalem-based cultural institution. Under his leadership, the center expanded its programming in Hebrew, English, and Russian, targeting diverse audiences including families, soldiers, and international visitors.

During the COVID-19 pandemic, Beit Avi Chai transitioned to virtual programming. Following the October 7 attacks, the center created trauma-informed initiatives for evacuees and IDF units.

Signature projects under his tenure include:

- Let Objects Speak, an international video series
- The weekly Kabbalat Shabbat performance series
- Annual exhibitions of contemporary Israeli/Jewish art
- Podcasts, literary anthologies, artist residencies, and educational materials

In 2023, he co-curated the exhibition Anatoli Kaplan: The Enchanted Artist with Amichai Chasson at the Beit Avi Chai Gallery in Jerusalem.

Rozenson advocates for a balance between tradition and innovation, using education and culture to connect diverse Jewish communities. His work emphasizes accessibility and dialogue across ideological, generational, and cultural divides. In addition to his executive leadership roles, Rozenson has authored essays on Jewish literature, culture, and identity. He has been featured in podcasts and interviews with organizations such as The Tikvah Fund and Tablet Magazine, and lectures internationally on Jewish culture and post-Soviet Jewish life.

== Honors and Affiliations ==
- 2010: Russia's Man of the Year Award, presented at the Kremlin Palace of Congresses
- 2015: Honorary Citizenship of Saint Petersburg, awarded by the World Club of Petersburgers
- 2015: Rozenson published a Russian-language monograph, Isaac Babel: Man and Paradox (Russian language: «Бабель: человек и парадокс»), which was named one of Russia's top ten nonfiction books of the year.

== Personal life ==
Rozenson is married to Jenny Rozenson, a psychologist originally from Lipetsk, Russia, and raised in Sydney, Australia. They have six children and grandchildren.
