= Alan David Hoffmann =

Israeli educator

- אלן דוד הופמן
- Born: 1946 (age 79–80); Johannesburg, South Africa
- Citizenship: Israeli
- Education: University of Witwatersrand (BA in Political Science and Philosophy); Hebrew University of Jerusalem (Law and Jewish Philosophy); Harvard Graduate School of Education
- Occupation: Educator
- Known for: Director-General and CEO of the Jewish Agency for Israel (2010–2018)
- Board member of: Jewish Agency for Israel (former Director-General and CEO); Melton Centre for Jewish Education at Hebrew University (former Director); Center for Initiatives in Jewish Education (former Director); Mandel Center at the Hebrew University (former Director)
- Spouse: Nadia Hoffmann
- Children: 4

Alan David Hoffmann (Hebrew: אלן דוד הופמן) is an Israeli educator who served as the Director-General and CEO of the Jewish Agency for Israel from 2010-2018.

== Early life ==
Hoffmann was born in 1946 in Johannesburg, South Africa to Dr. Samuel Hoffmann, an anesthetist, and Ida (Cohen). After his graduation from the University of Witwatersrand (1966) in political science and philosophy, he became the Education Director of his local Zionist Youth Movement, Habonim, followed by service as the movement's Secretary General and CEO.

== Career ==
With the outbreak of the Six-Day War, Hoffmann went to Israel to volunteer, leading to his Aliyah and service in the IDF (1968-1970) in the Nachal Paratroop Brigade. From 1971-73, Hoffmann attended Hebrew University in Law and Jewish philosophy, alongside teaching on Young Judea's Year Course through Hadassah. From 1973-76, he was the Director of the Year Course. Hoffmann was a graduate student at Harvard Graduate School of Education (1976–79).

In 1979, Hoffmann returned to Israel where he became Director of Evaluation of JDC Israel. In 1980 he was recruited by Professor Seymour Fox and Professor Michael Rosenak to the Melton Centre for Jewish Education in the Diaspora. He spent the next decade and a half at the Melton Center for Jewish Education of Hebrew University – serving as its Director from 1984-94.

In 1994, Hoffmann took a leave of absence from Hebrew University and was appointed Director of the Center for Initiatives in Jewish Education (CIJE) in New York, initiated and sponsored by Morton Mandel.

In 1996, Hoffmann returned to Israel to serve as the Director of the Mandel Center at the Hebrew University, where he co-founded the Revivim program at Hebrew University with Professor Yair Zakovitch. He joined the Jewish Agency for Israel (JAFI) in 2000.

For the next decade, he served as the Director General of the Department of Jewish Zionist Education at the Jewish Agency. In March 2010 he was appointed Director General and CEO of the Jewish Agency and was the first immigrant to hold this position.

While at the Jewish Agency, Hoffmann co-founded Masa Israel Journey with JAFI Chairman Sallai Meridor and Prime Minister Ariel Sharon in 2004, developed the Makom Israel Education Lab, and then co-founded the service year shlichim initiative (Shinshinim) in 2014.

== Personal life ==
Hoffmann lives in Jerusalem with his wife, Nadia and together they have four children.
