= The Bronfman Fellowship =

Israeli-American non-profit educational program

- Formation: 1987; 39 years ago
- Type: non-profit educational program
- Location(s): New York, NY and Jerusalem, Israel
- Executive Director: Rebecca Voorwinde
- Website: Bronfman.org

The Bronfman Fellowship is a non-profit educational program for young Jews in Israel and North America.

The Bronfman Fellowship selects 26 outstanding North American teenagers and 22 Israeli teenagers for a rigorous academic year of seminars including a free, five-week trip to Israel for North American Fellows between the summer of Fellows’ junior and senior years of high school, and a free trip to the United States for Israeli Fellows during their final year of high school. The program educates exceptional young Jews from diverse backgrounds to grow into leaders grounded in their Jewish identity and committed to pluralism.

Founded in 1987 by philanthropist Edgar M. Bronfman, it is partially funded through his foundation, The Samuel Bronfman Foundation. It was formerly known as The Bronfman Youth Fellowships in Israel (BYFI).

The Bronfman Fellowship's network of over 1,400 alumni include 9 Rhodes Scholars, 2 Schwarzman Scholars, 20 Fulbright Scholars, 35 Wexner Fellows and 27 Dorot Fellows. The 2011 applicant to Fellow ratio was 12:1. Chuck Hughes, former Senior Admissions Officer at Harvard, described the Fellowship as one of the programs which "act as filters for admissions officers to validate candidates who have been similarly identified by other organizations for talent and promise."

== History ==
The Bronfman Fellowship was founded in 1987 by Edgar M. Bronfman, in response to what he perceived as a lack of dialogue among the various Jewish denominations in North America. Edgar also dreamed of a renaissance of Torah study, in which all Jews would not only be welcomed into the dialogue but would also be equipped with the thoughtfulness and Jewish literacy to engage in serious study of Jewish texts. In 1998, the organization launched Amitei Bronfman, its program for young Israelis.

== Educational Philosophy ==
The Bronfman Fellowship's "Bronfmanim Impact Framework" outlines the four core developmental goals for Fellows: Community Builders, Deep Thinkers, Moral Voices, and Cultural Creators. Their methodology for achieving these goals is grounded both in experiential learning and in Jewish text study, facilitated by professional rabbis and Jewish educators who share the Fellowship's philosophical commitments. The Fellowship places particular emphasis on the intellectual autonomy of the young Fellows, rather than on any one particular worldview or mode of Jewish practice.

The Fellowship utilizes Jewish text study as a central pedagogical framework. A broad variety of works serve as jumping-off points for conversation, including canonical texts such as the Tanakh and the Talmud, philosophy, literature, poetry, and visual art.

The Bronfman Fellowship's pedagogy is also relational, with knowledge emerging not from one rabbi or text but from ongoing conversations among Fellows and faculty. One of the first traditional texts which each Fellowship cohort studies is a famous line of Pirkei Avot which translates to “make for yourself a teacher, acquire for yourself a friend.” This text is used to introduce one of the core tenets of the program: that connecting with others and engaging in challenging dialogue with them allows friends to become teachers, and teachers to become friends. The Fellowship intentionally selects as religiously and politically diverse a cohort as possible.

== Program Description ==
The Bronfman Fellowship program consists of three dedicated group experiences, regular video conferences throughout the year, and a culminating project.

In the summer, fellows spend five weeks in Israel, engaging in learning and bonding with their peers while traveling the country. They also have the opportunity to live in a homestay with an Israeli Fellow ("Amit") during part of the trip. In December, the Israeli Amitim come to the United States for their own travel experience, as well as a weekend retreat and a homestay with the American Fellows. In the spring, Fellows embark on a five-day exploration of American-Jewish identity, typically New York City or Washington, D.C.

Throughout the Fellowship Year, Fellows work on their Beyond Bronfman project, a process of exploration of a question or idea, which culminates in an artifact which Fellows then share with their peers. Throughout the program Fellows meet with a large variety of educators, authors, artists, and leading thinkers in the Israeli/Jewish landscape. The educators are often alumni of the program or previous educators/directors, among them Rabbi Mishael Zion, Gila Fine, Ilana Kurshan, Dr. Evan Parks, and Sivan Har-Shefi.

== Disruptions ==
In the 2020 cohort's summer experience was fully remote and the 2021 cohort stayed in the United States due to the COVID-19 pandemic.

The 2024 cohort also had a modified schedule, staying in the United States for most of the summer (4 weeks) and spending only 1 week in Israel due to the Gaza war after October 7th. The extra time spent by the fellows in the United States shifted the focus of the year towards the complexities and nuances of American Judaism. Fellows spoke with a variety of American Jewish leaders to understand how America has created an environment for Jewish innovation and evolution.

== Alumni ==
Following the Fellowship Year, Bronfman Fellows join an alumni community of over 1,400 people across North America and Israel. From 1987 to 2017, the most frequently attended colleges by alumni were Harvard, Yale, Princeton, Brown, and Columbia.

Alumni are able to take advantage of programs such as collegiate gatherings, lectures and seminars, mentoring programs, interest groups, and a pluralism discussion series. Alumni also participate in an active listserv that helps to connect them and spark discussions in a pluralistic space. The Bronfman Fellowship’s approach to building a community among alumni at different life stages has been featured by The Schusterman Family Foundation’s Alumni Playbook.

In 2005, The Bronfman Fellowship launched the Bronfman Alumni Venture Fund (AVF), the first Jewish mini-grant program of its kind, which fundraises from the Fellowship’s North American and Israeli alumni for the sole purpose of re-distributing that funding to alumni-led projects. The projects supported serve the wider community and perpetuate the values of pluralism, Jewish learning, engagement with Israel, and social responsibility. As of 2025, the AVF has distributed over $398,000 in grants to projects led by over 200 alumni. The AVF was named one of the nation’s 50 most innovative Jewish nonprofits by Slingshot in their 2010-11 and 2011-12 guides.

== Notable alumni ==
=== Authors ===
- Jonathan Safran Foer
- Dara Horn
- Daniel Handler, pen name Lemony Snicket
- Ilana Kurshan
- Itamar Moses

=== Journalists ===
- Matti Friedman
- Adam Davidson, NPR business correspondent and NYT Magazine Columnist
- Jonathan Tepperman, Managing Editor of Foreign Affairs
- Anya Kamenetz, lead education blogger at NPR and author of The Art of Screen Time

=== Filmmakers ===
- Amir Bar Lev, documentary film director
- Etan Cohen
- Noah Oppenheim, former President of NBC News

=== Creatives ===
- Alex Riff, poet and co-founder of the Cultural Brigade for Russian-Jewish Israeli Heritage
- Aryeh Nussbaum Cohen, counter-tenor

=== Jewish leaders ===
- Angela Warnick Buchdahl, senior rabbi at Manhattan's Central Synagogue
- Joshua Foer and Brett Lockspeiser, co-creators of Sefaria
- Judith Rosenbaum, Executive Director of the Jewish Women’s Archive
- Yehuda Kurtzer, President of the Shalom Hartman Institute of North America

=== Other ===
- Tali Farhadian (born 1975 or 1976), Iranian-born American former federal prosecutor

== See also ==
- Birthright Israel
