= Dov Karmi =

Israeli architect

- דב כרמי
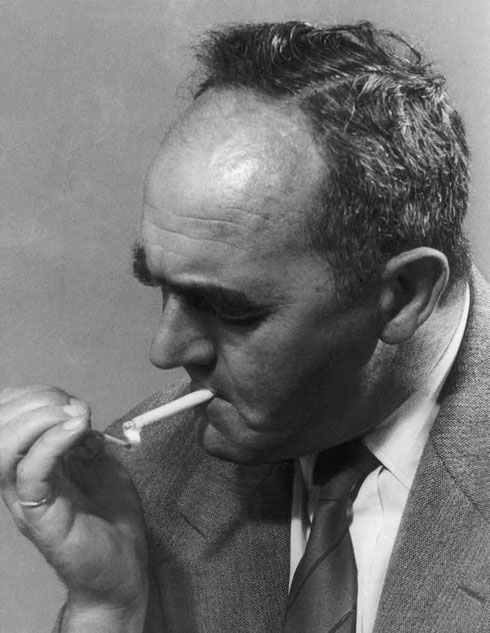
- Born: 1905; Zhvanets, Russian Empire (now Ukraine)
- Died: 14 May 1962 (aged 56–57); Israel
- Education: Ghent University
- Occupation: Architect
- Awards: Israel Prize (1957)
- Buildings: Max-Liebling House, Tel Aviv, 1936; Culture Palace, Tel Aviv, 1957; The Knesset, Jerusalem (with other architects), 1958-1966
- Known for: Leading figure in modernist architecture in Israel

Dov Karmi (Hebrew: דב כרמי; 1905 – 14 May 1962) was an architect of Mandatory Palestine and Israel.

== Biography ==
Dov Karmi was born in 1905, the son of Hannah and Sholom Weingarten, in Zhvanets, Russian Empire, in modern-day Ukraine. In 1921, the family resettled in Mandatory Palestine, the future State of Israel.

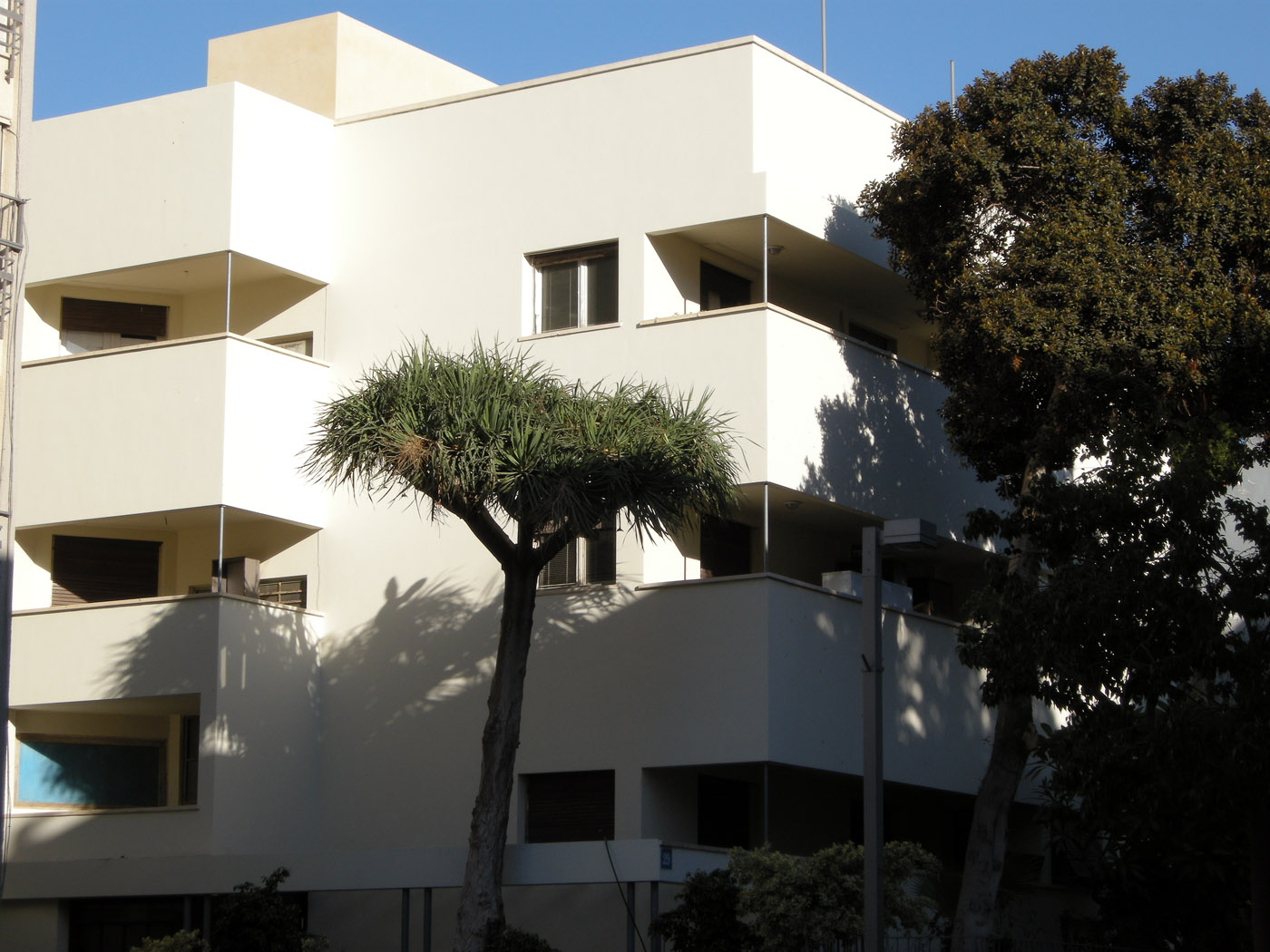
Max-Liebling House

Karmi studied painting at the Bezalel Academy of Art and Design , Jerusalem, but was attracted to architecture and went to Belgium to complete his studies in this field at Ghent University.

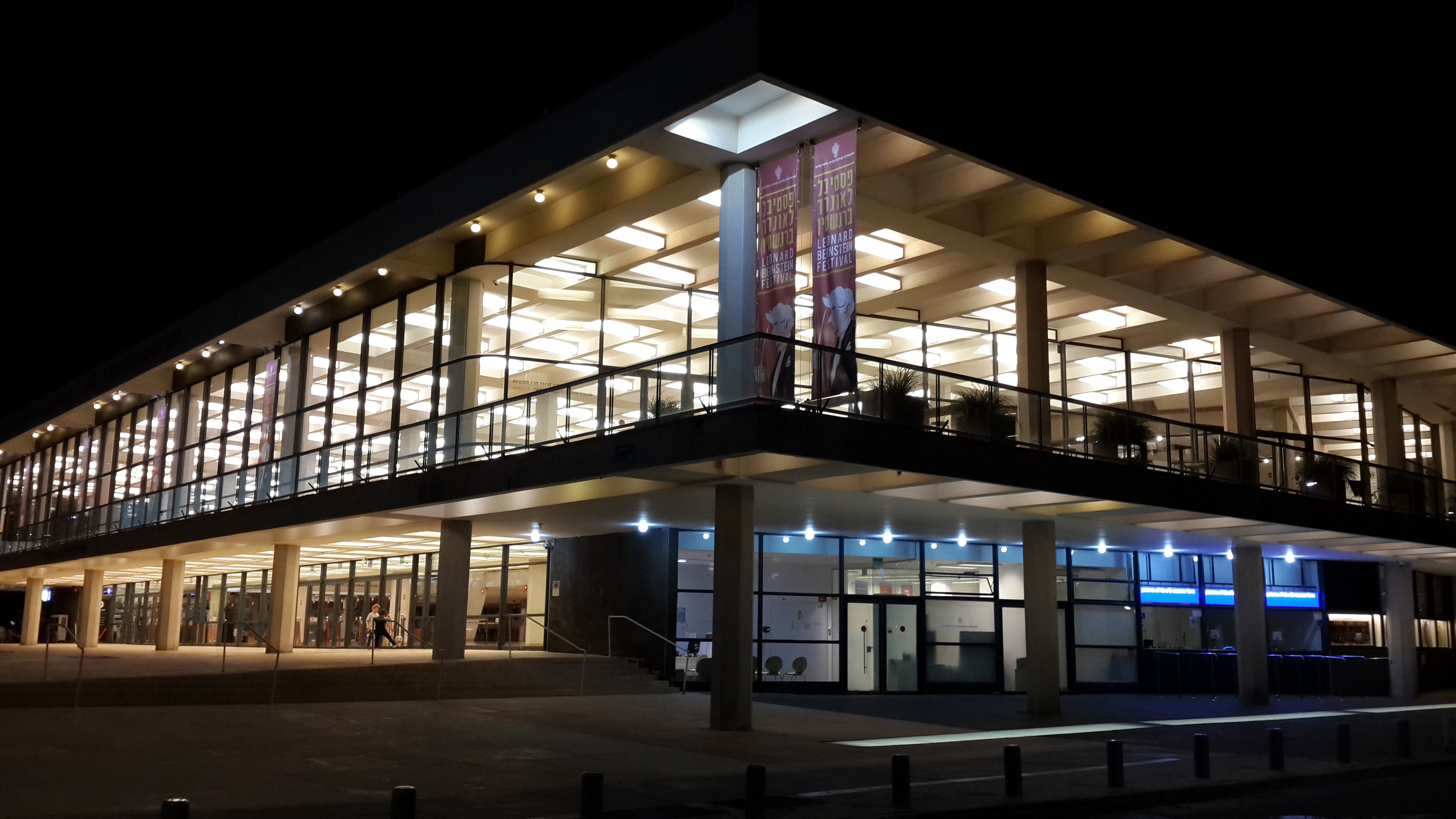

== Architecture career ==
In 1932, Karmi moved to Tel Aviv and co-founded the Circle, a group aiming to introduce modern architecture to the city. Alongside Zeev Rechter and Arieh Sharon, Karmi helped shape local architecture and became a leading figure in the professional and cultural elite. Later Karmi also worked with his son, Ram Karmi. During his professional career he designed more than two hundred buildings, mostly in Tel Aviv. Karmi's main style was modernist; he influenced a generation of Israeli architects.

== Israel Prize ==
In 1957, Karmi was awarded the Israel Prize, for architecture, the first recipient of the Prize in this field.

== Family ==
Karmi married Haia Maklev; the couple had two children, both of whom became notable architects. In 2002, Karmi's son, Ram Karmi, was awarded the Israel Prize for architecture and Carmi's daughter, Ada Karmi-Melamede, was awarded the Israel Prize for architecture, in 2007.

== Major buildings ==
- Max-Liebling House, Tel Aviv, 1936
- Culture Palace, Tel Aviv, 1957 (with Zeev Rechter and Yaakov Rechter)

=== Contributions ===
- The Knesset (Jerusalem, 1958-1966) was built after an initial plan by Joseph Klarwein, with modifications by Shimon Powsner, Dov and Ram Karmi, Bill Gillitt, and an interior design by Dora Gad.

== See also ==
- List of Israel Prize recipients
