= Supreme Court of Israel Building =

Supreme Court Building
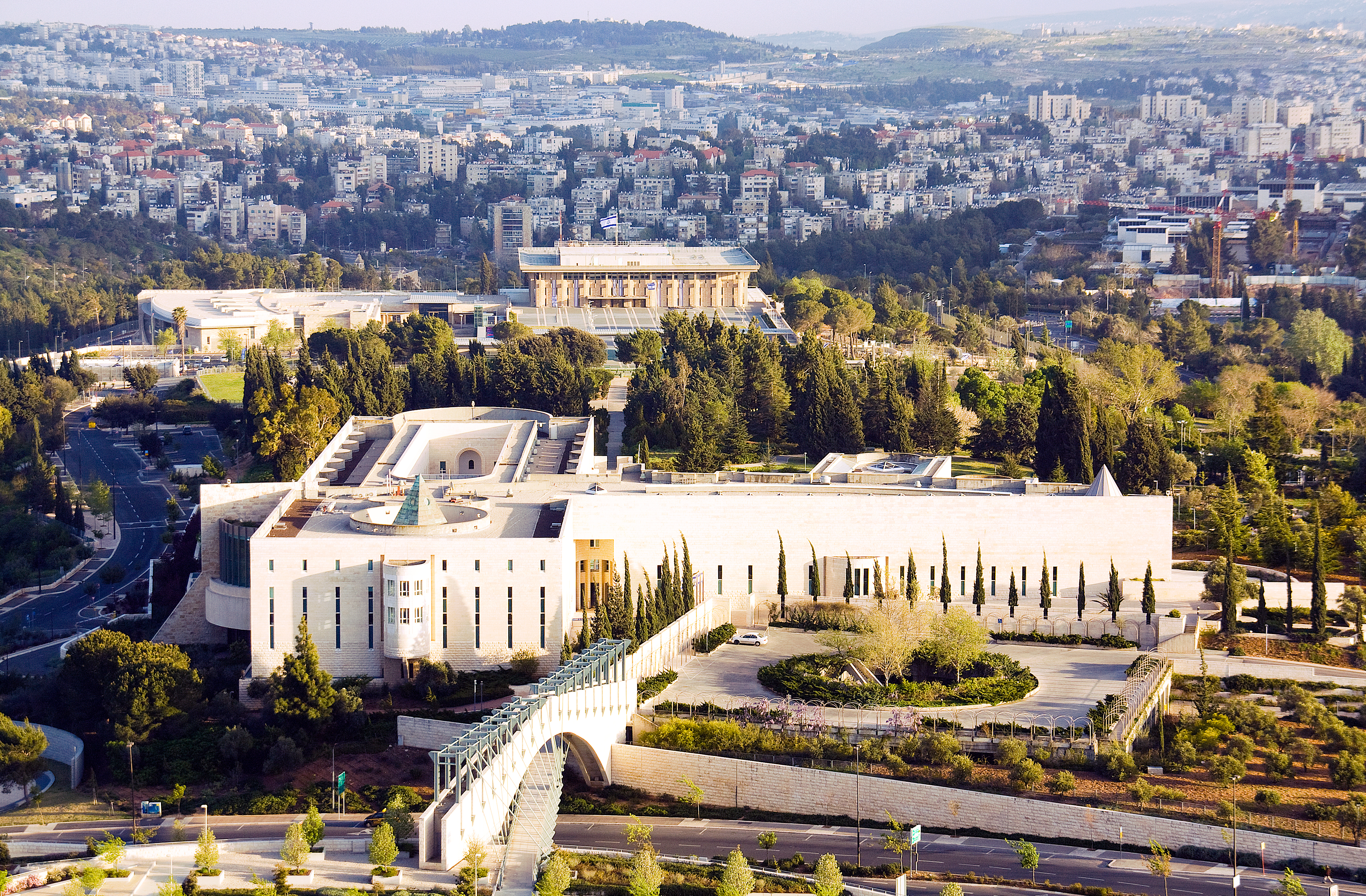
- The building of the Israeli Supreme Court from above.

- Location within Jerusalem

General information
- Architectural style: Traditional, Post Modern
- Location: 1 Derech HaShofet Meir Shamgar, Kiryat Ben-Gurion, Jerusalem, Israel
- Coordinates: 31°46′51″N 35°12′13″E
- Construction started: 1982; 44 years ago
- Completed: 1992; 34 years ago
- Owner: State of Israel

Design and construction
- Architects: Ada Karmi-Melamede, Ram Karmi

The Supreme Court of Israel resides in a building in the Givat Ra'am neighbourhood in Jerusalem. The building was inaugurated in 1992, having been designed by Israeli architects Ada Karmi-Melamede and her brother Ram Karmi. Its design combines both traditional motifs as well as post modernist architectural design. The Supreme Court's building resides on the highest hill in Jerusalem, symbolising rule of law over all in Israel.

== History ==
In 1986, an architectural competition was held to design a permanent building for the Supreme Court of Israel, which had operated for decades out of a historic structure in Jerusalem's Russian Compound. The Yad Hanadiv foundation (the Rothschild family philanthropic trust) offered to fund the construction of a new complex within the Kiryat HaMemshala (Government Complex). This initiative was intended to complete the "democratic triangle" on the hill, encompassing the legislative (the Knesset), executive (the Government ministries), and judicial (the Supreme Court) branches as well as providing the nation's highest judicial authority with a purpose-built facility. Prominent international architects participated in the competition, including Ricardo Legorreta and Richard Meier. The commission was ultimately awarded to Tel Aviv-based architects and siblings Ada Karmi-Melamede and Ram Karmi. Construction began in 1989 and was completed in 1992. The building received some architectural criticism regarding its spatial functionality; however, it garnered praise for its elegance, aesthetic harmony, and symbolic integration with Jerusalem's architectural heritage and traditional Jewish motifs. The complex features five courtrooms designed with consistent formal motifs and an emphasis on natural daylight, varying primarily in scale to accommodate differing caseload needs. The facility also houses judicial chambers, the Courtyard of the Arches, a law library, and a panoramic window overlooking the city. The building resides on the highest hill in Jerusalem standing symbolically even higher than the Israeli parliament building, symbolising Israel's rule of law.

== Gallery ==
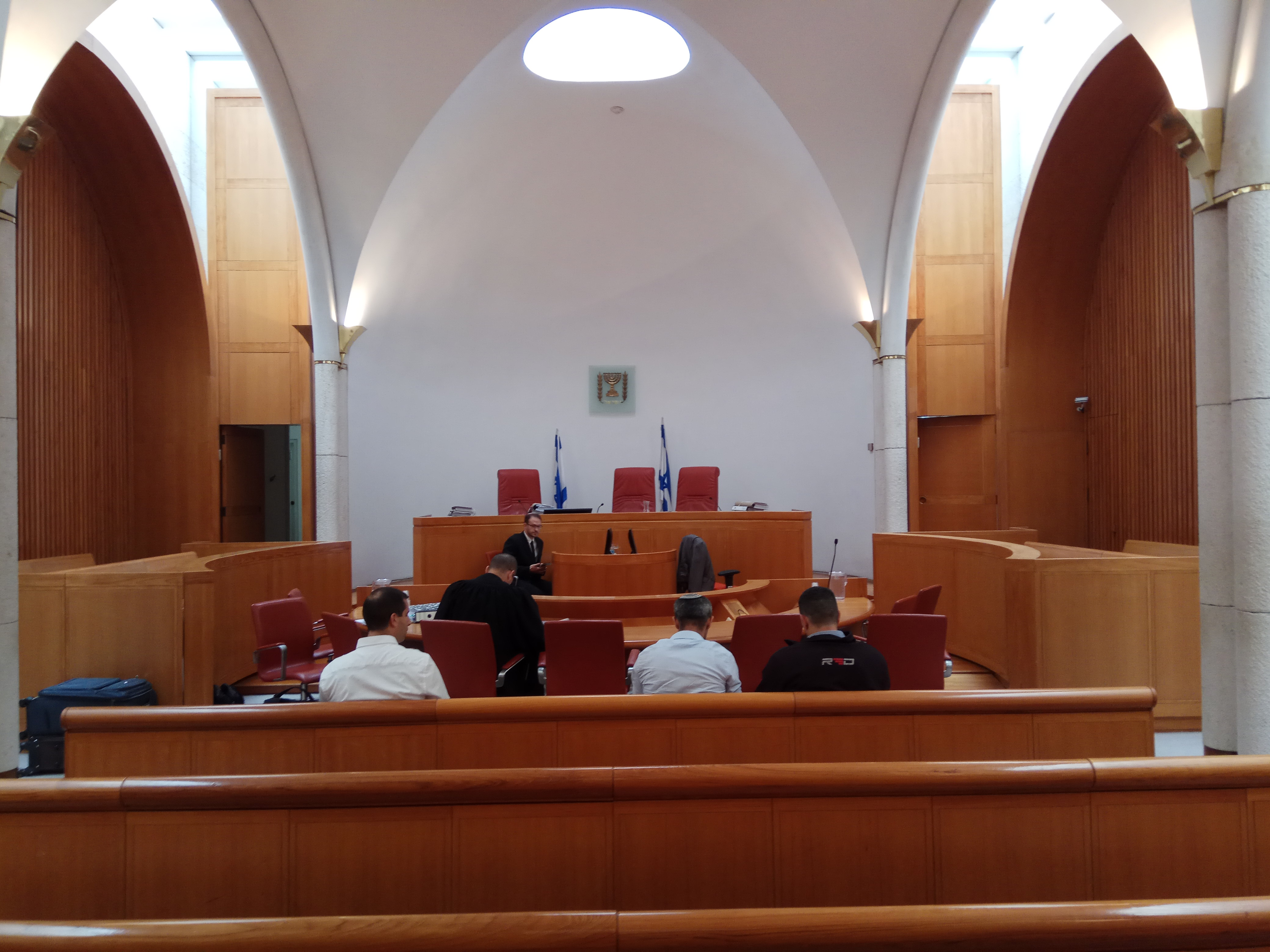
A hearing hall

A hearing hall, 2024

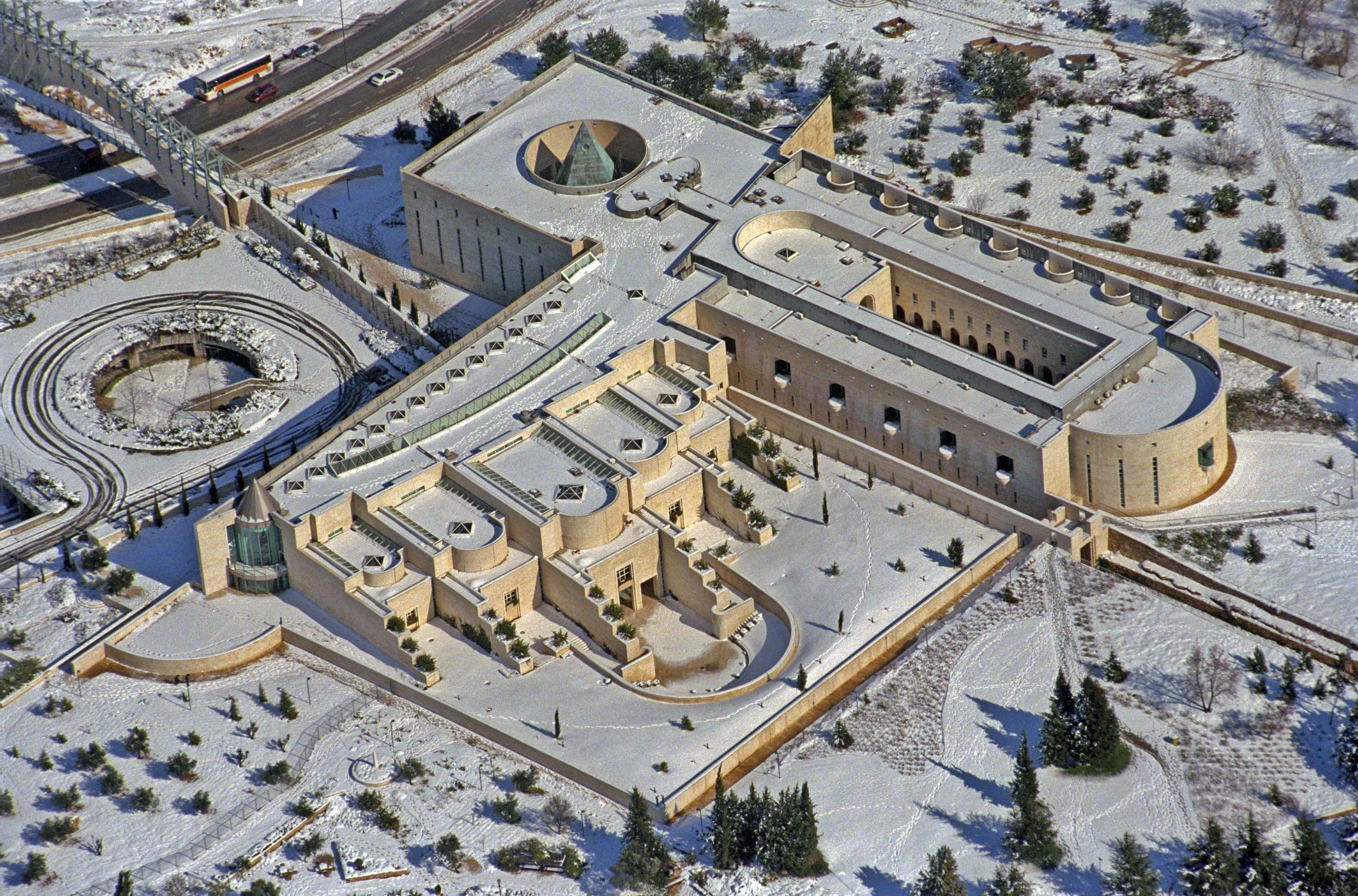
The building from above after snowfall, 1998
