= Beit Avi Chai =

Israeli art gallery

- בית אבי חי
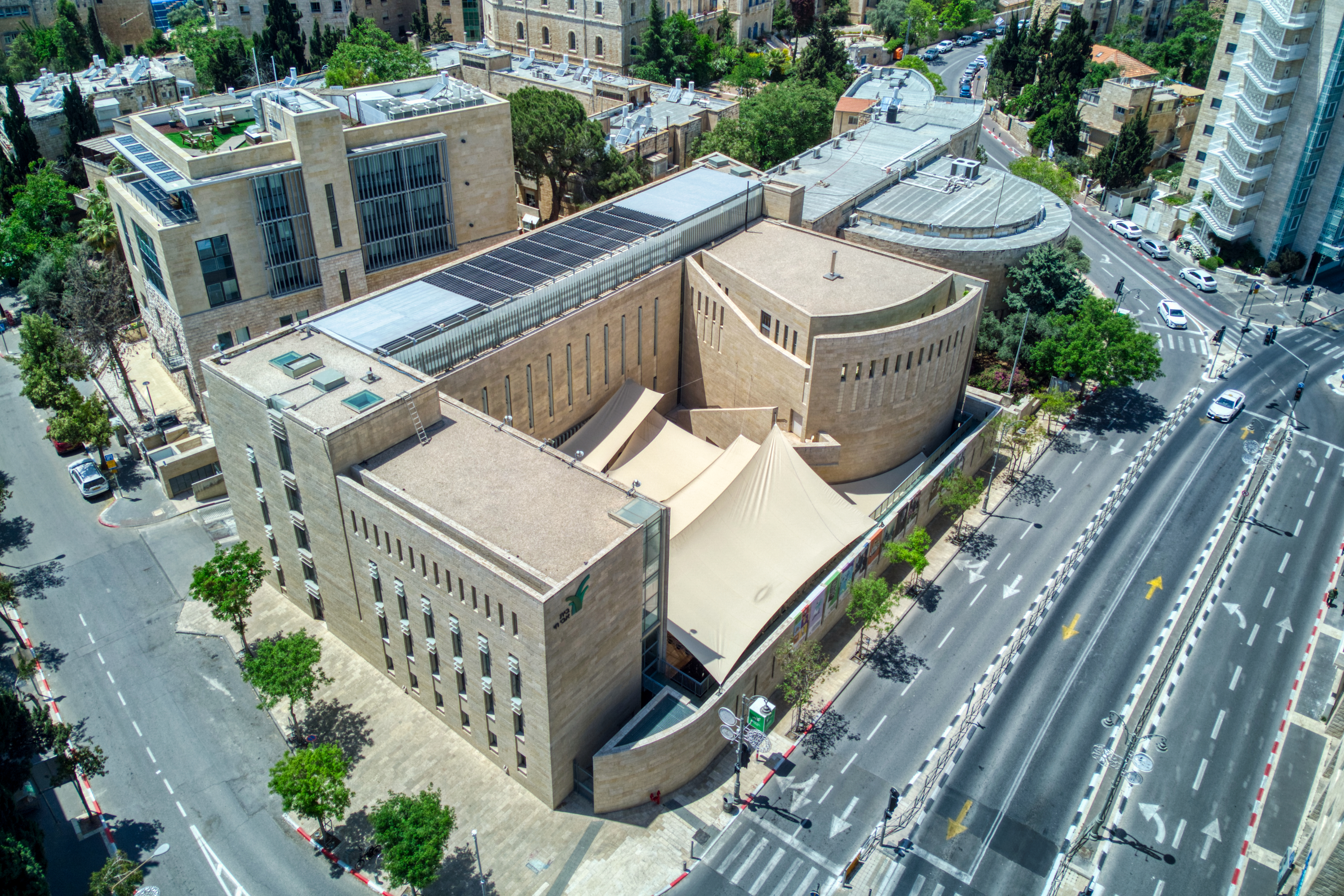
- Beit Avi Chai, 2023
- Established: 2007
- Location: 44 King George Street, Jerusalem, Israel
- Coordinates: 31.7774°N 35.2159°E
- Type: Cultural center and Art museum
- Visitors: Ada Karmi-Melamede
- Founder: Avi Chai Foundation
- Director: David Rozenson
- Public transit access: Bus Nos. 19, 22, 34, 59, 74
- Website: www.bac.org.il/en/

Beit Avi Chai (Hebrew: בית אבי חי) is a cultural center and art gallery located in Jerusalem, Israel. It was established by the Avi Chai Foundation to promote Jewish-Israeli culture, creativity, and identity. The center hosts an array of artistic performances, academic lectures, public events, podcasts, web series and visual art exhibitions, which reflect various perspectives on Jewish life, thought, and contemporary Israeli society.

== History and establishment ==
Beit Avi Chai was founded in 2007 with the support of the Avi Chai Foundation, which focuses on fostering Jewish commitment and continuity. The foundation, active in Israel, United States, and the former Soviet Union, was established by philanthropist Zalman Bernstein to encourage Jewish learning and cultural engagement through various educational and artistic initiatives. The Jerusalem center is the foundation’s flagship project in Israel.

The building, located on King George Street in central Jerusalem, was designed by Ada Karmi-Melamede, recipient of the Israel Prize for Architecture. Its modern design, featuring clean lines and open spaces, reflects the center's innovative approach to Jewish culture, blending tradition with contemporary artistic and intellectual expression.

Beit Avi Chai serves as a platform for dialogue and interaction between diverse segments of Israeli society and the global Jewish community. Its programming includes a wide range of cultural forms, such as film screenings, theater performances, musical concerts, lectures, panel discussions, and workshops focusing on Jewish history, philosophy, literature, and social issues.

In addition to its physical space, Its website provides access to recorded lectures, concerts, cultural events, and online courses and digital resources for educators and students interested in Jewish studies.

Since 2012, Dr. David Rozenson has served as the director of Beit Avi Chai, and Professor Avigdor Shinan acts as the center's academic advisor. The poet Amichai Chasson serves as the artistic director and chief curator of the Beit Avi Chai Art Gallery.

== Beit Avi Chai's art gallery ==
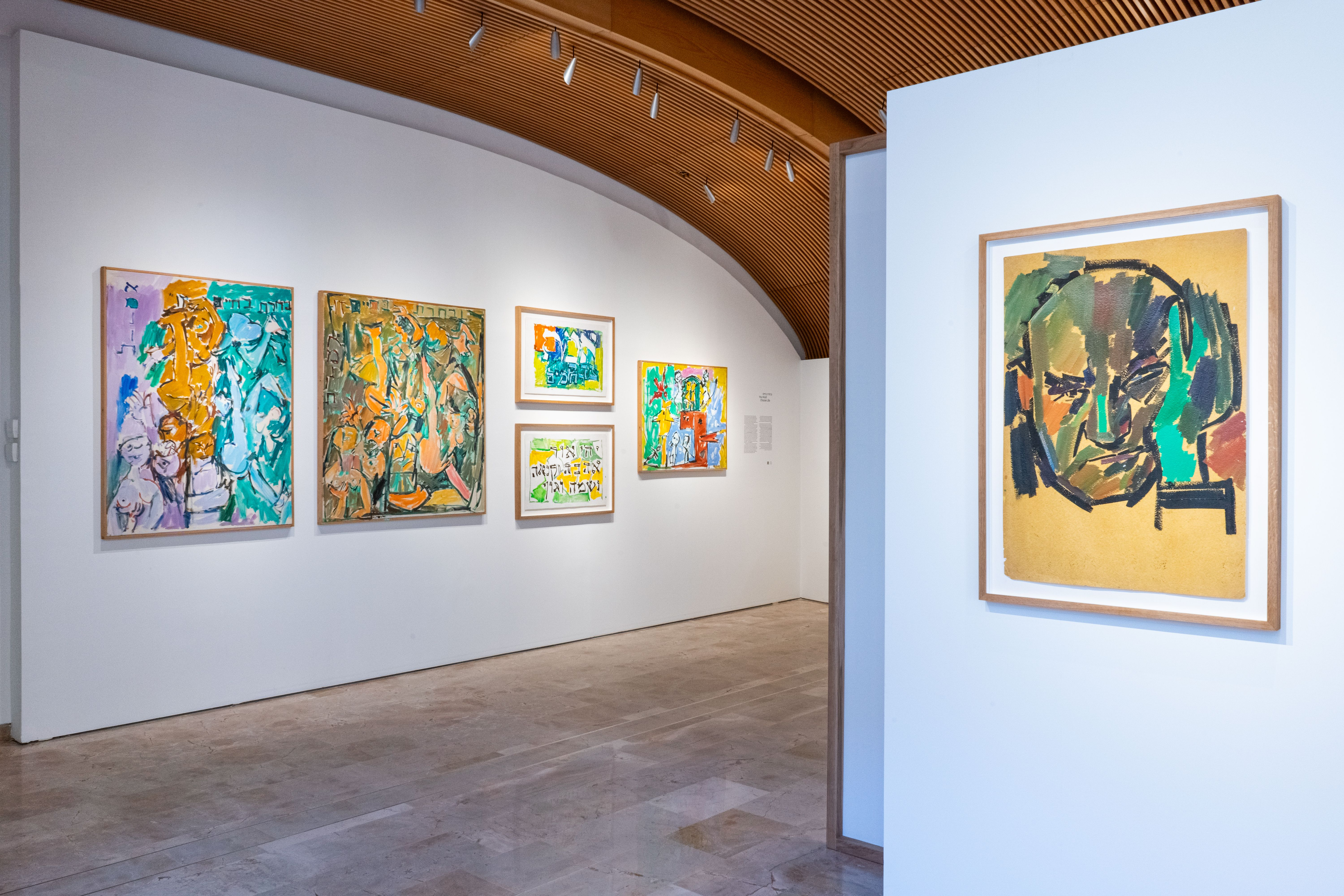
Detail from the Litvinovsky exhibition at Beit Avi Chai's Art Gallery (2024)

A central part of Beit Avi Chai is its modern art gallery, which hosts one major exhibition each year, accompanied by a catalog. Notable exhibitions in Beit Avi Chai’s gallery have featured works by Jewish-Russian artist Anatoli Kaplan, Israel Prize-winning painter Pinchas Litvinovsky, as well as prominent Israeli artists like Avraham Ofek, Amos Kenan, Ronny Someck, and Marek Yanai.

== See also ==
- List of museums in Israel
- Architecture of Israel
