= Ada Karmi-Melamede =

Israeli architect

- עדה כרמי-מלמד
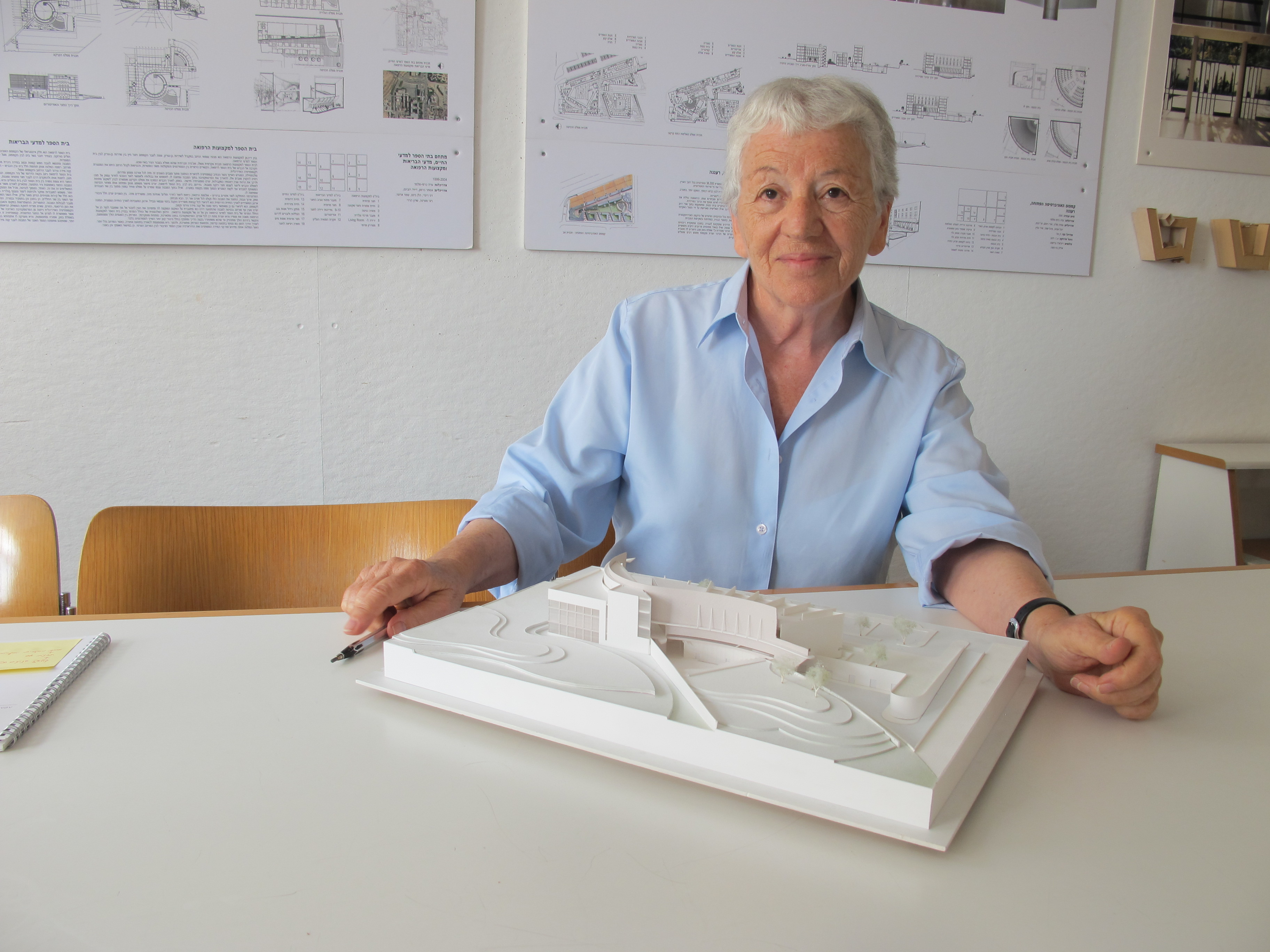
- Ada Karmi-Melamede
- Born: December 24, 1936; Tel Aviv, Mandatory Palestine
- Occupation: Architect
- Known for: Co-designing the Supreme Court of Israel building
- Awards: Israel Prize (2007); Sandberg Prize for Research in Art and Architecture (1985)

Ada Karmi-Melamede (Hebrew: עדה כרמי-מלמד; born 1936) is a noted Israeli architect.

== Biography ==
Karmi-Melamede was born on December 24, 1936, in Tel Aviv, in Mandate Palestine (now Israel).

She studied at the Architectural Association School of Architecture in London from 1956 to 1959 and at the Technion – Israel Institute of Technology from 1961 to 1962, being awarded her degree in 1963. She has taught at Columbia University (1969–1982), Yale University (1985, 1993), and the University of Pennsylvania (1991).

She established Ada Karmi-Melamede Architects in 1985 in Tel Aviv.

In 1986 she and her brother Ram Karmi won an international competition to design the Supreme Court of Israel compound, which opened in 1992. New York Times architecture critic Paul Goldberger wrote that "the sharpness of the Mediterranean architectural tradition and the dignity of the law are here married with remarkable grace".

She is the subject of the documentary film Ada: My Mother the Architect (2024).

== Projects ==
Ramat Hanadiv Visiting Center, Ramat Hanadiv Memorial Gardens, 2008, Zikhron Ya'akov, Israel

Life Sciences Building, Ben-Gurion University, Beer-Sheva, Israel.

Supreme Court Building, Jerusalem, Israel, 1992.

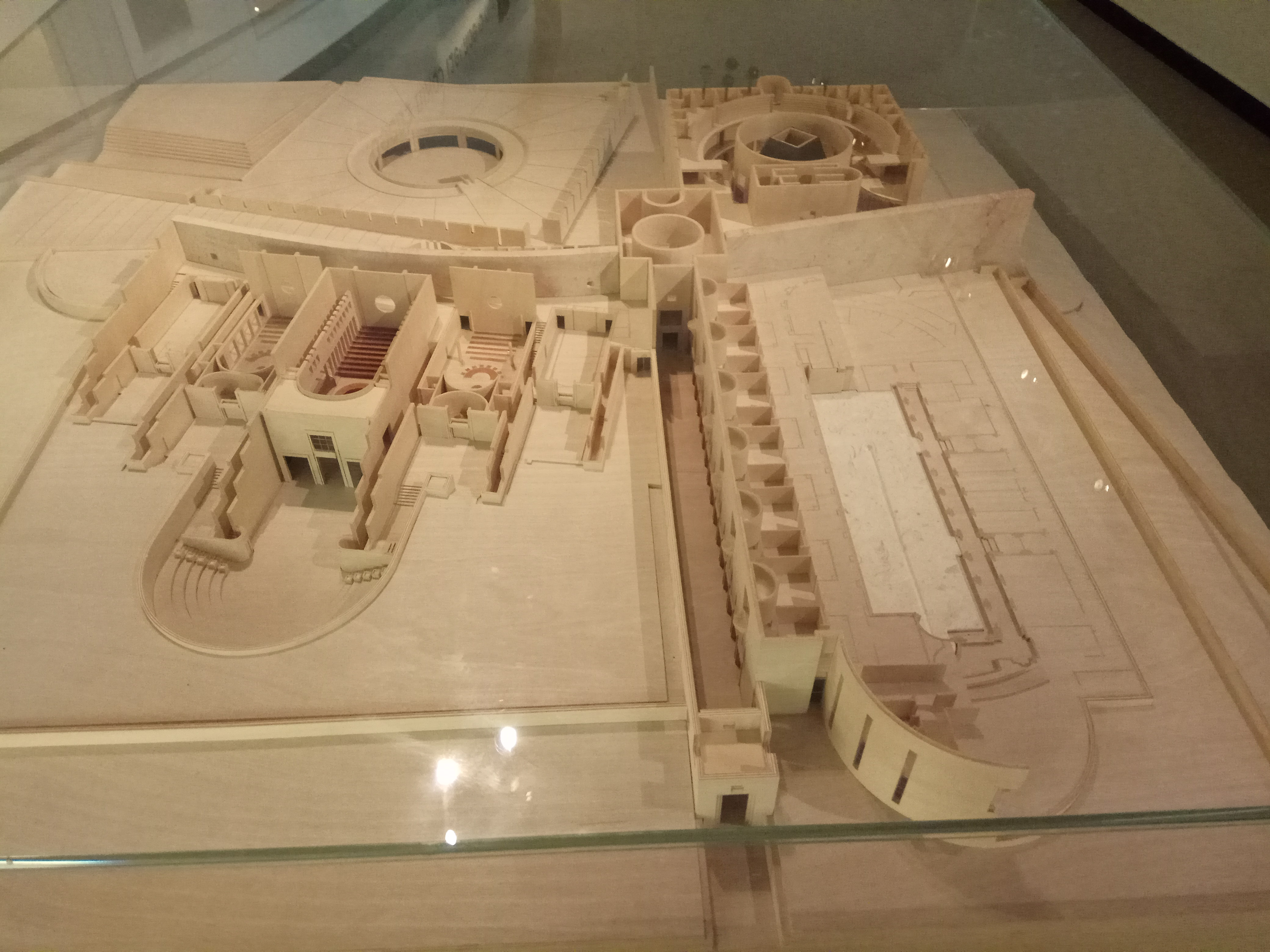
Model of Israel supreme court building

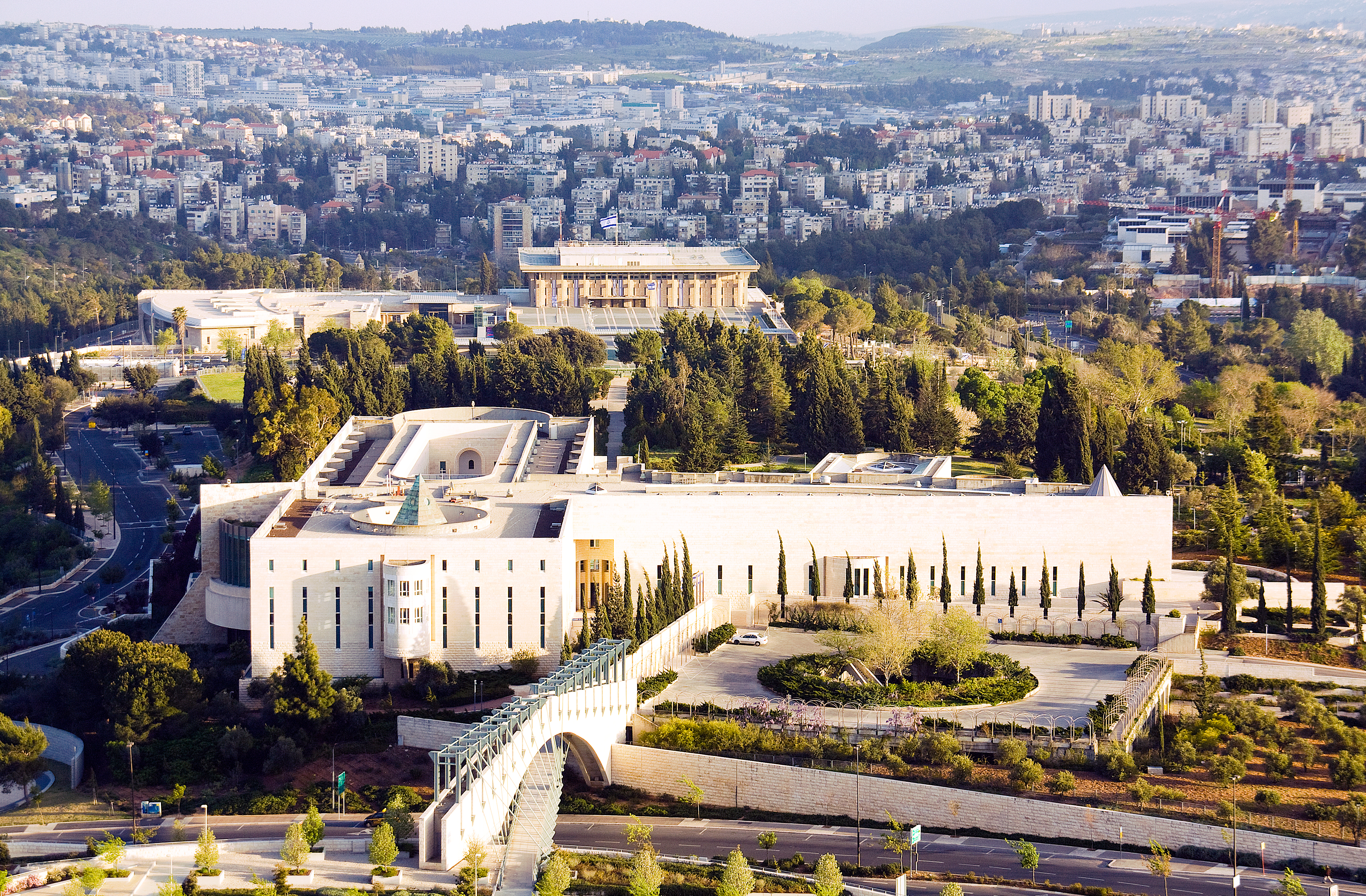
aerial view, Israel Supreme Court

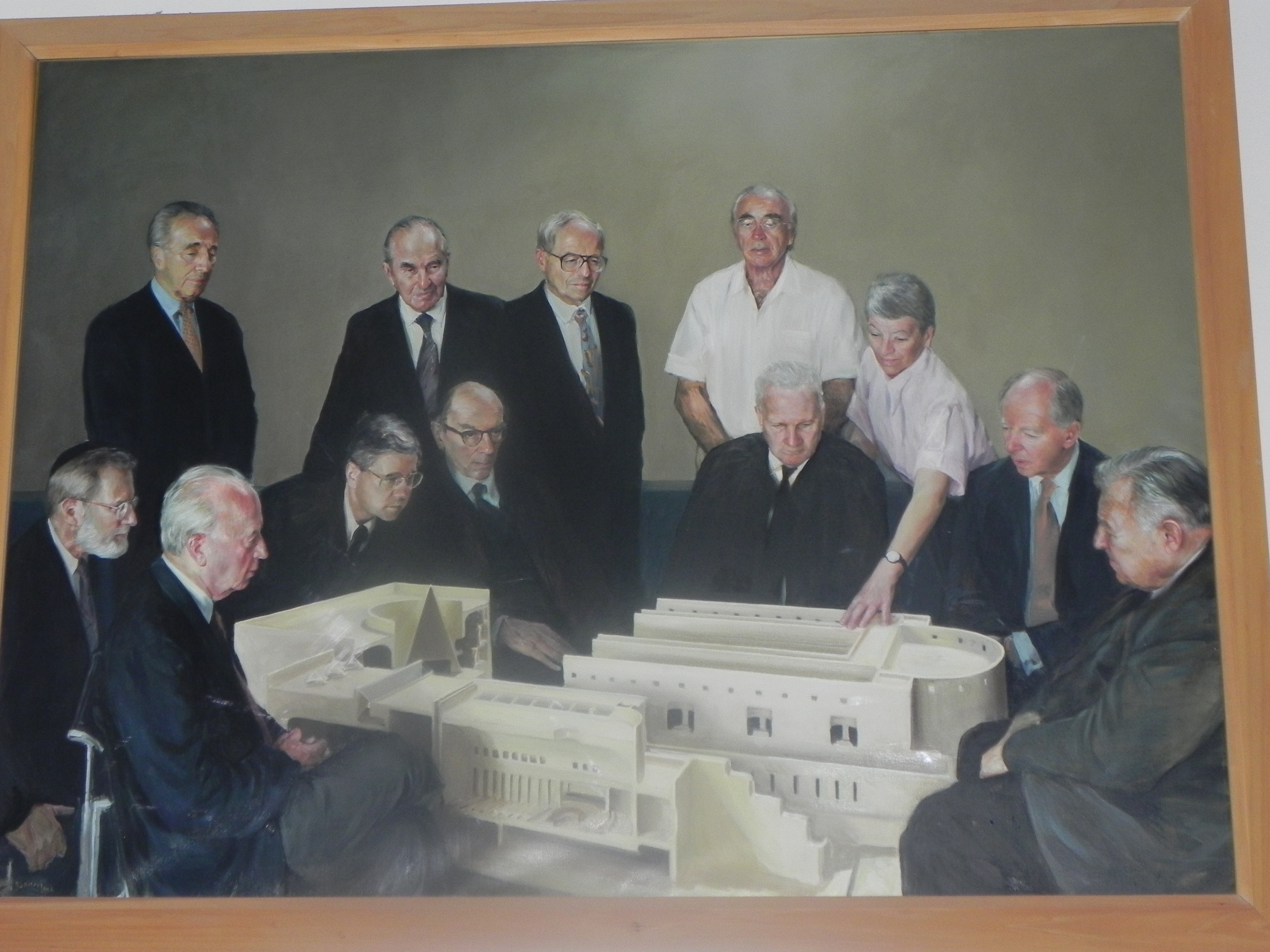
Viewing the model

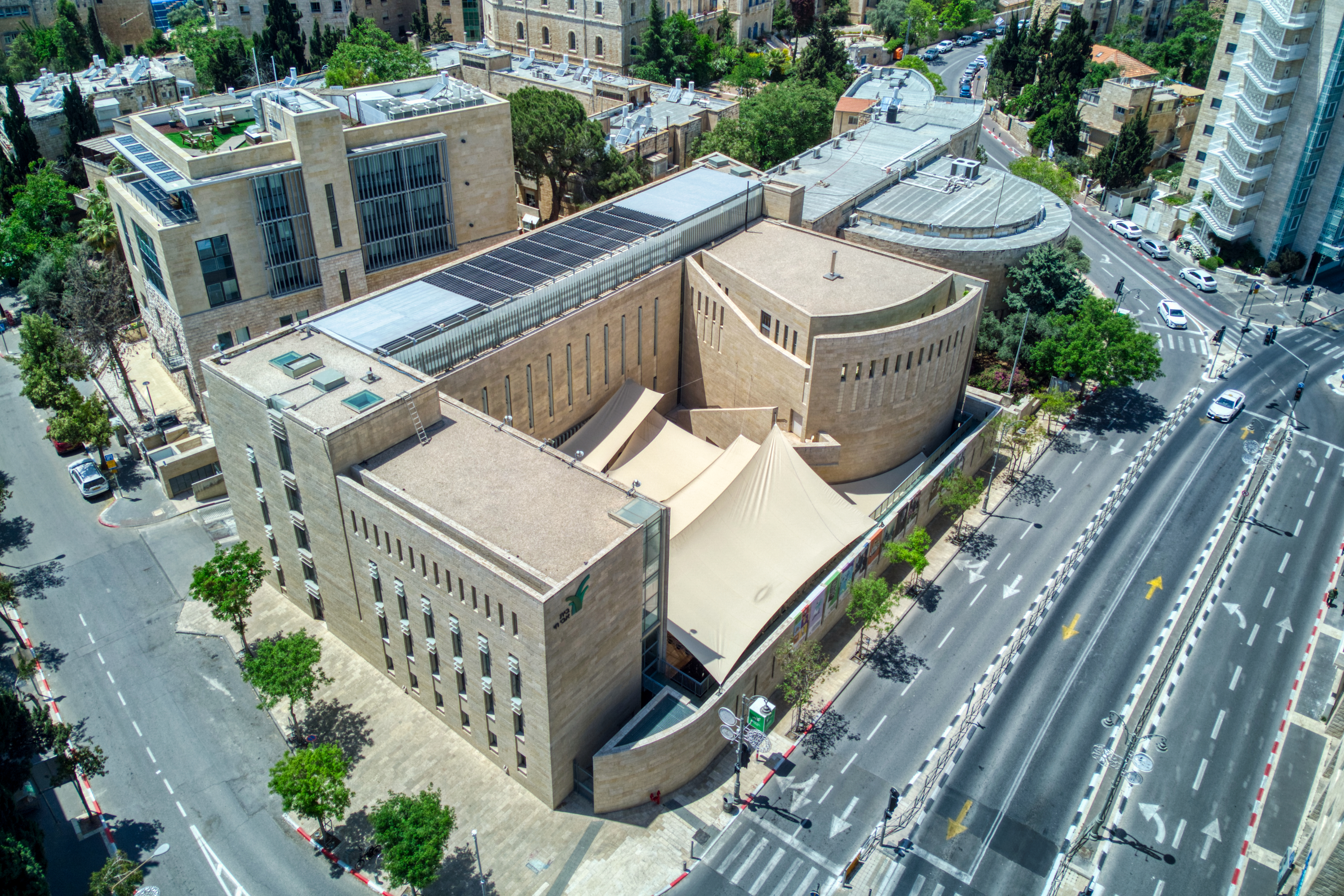
Beit Avi Chai

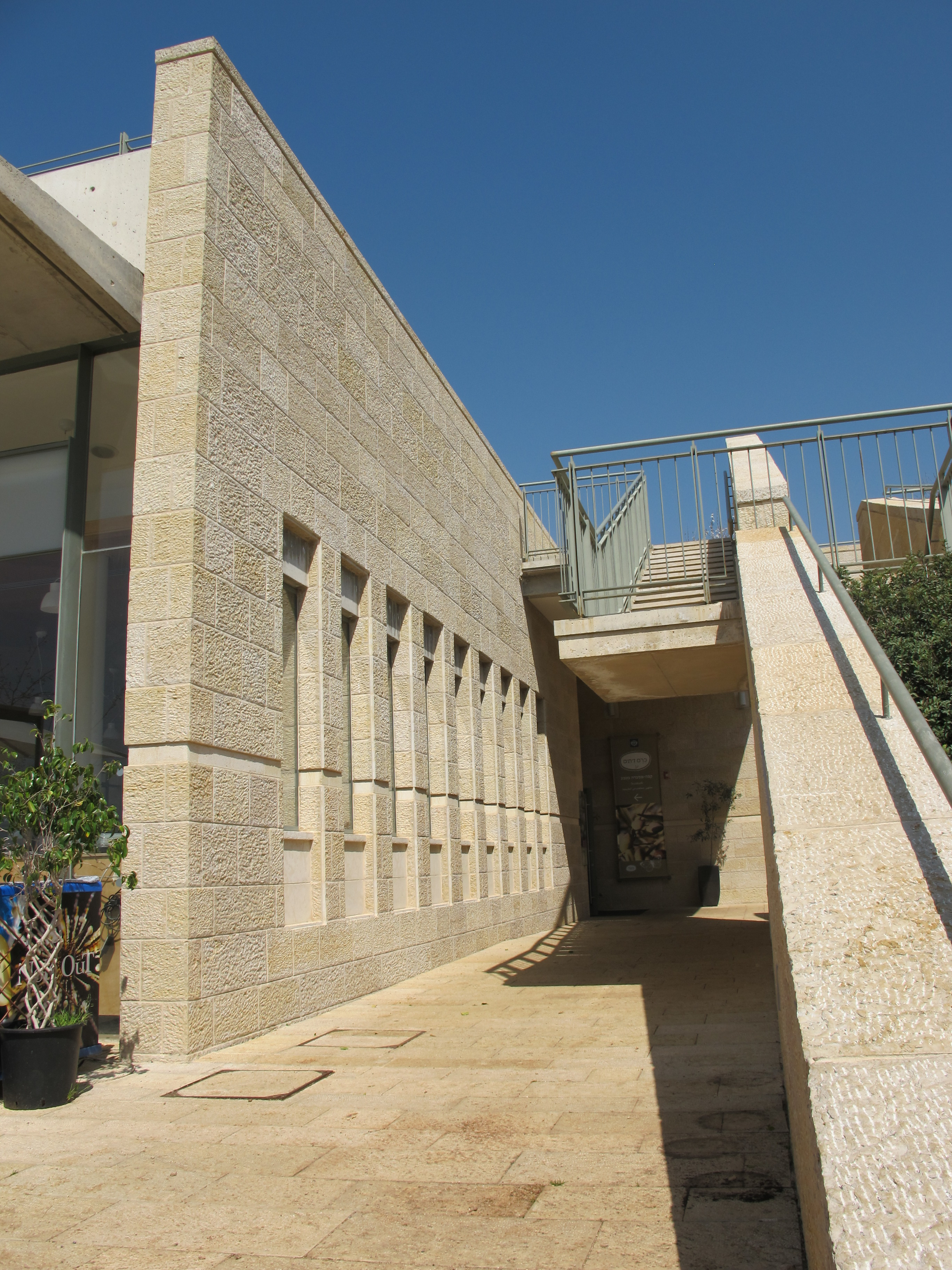
Ramat HaNadiv

== Awards ==
- In 2007, Karmi-Melamede was awarded the Israel Prize, for architecture, the second woman to have ever been awarded this prize. Her father, Dov Karmi, had received the same prize in 1957, and her brother Ram Karmi in 2002.
- Awarded the Sandberg Prize for Research in Art and Architecture (1985?)
- Awarded grants from the United States National Endowment for the Arts
  - New York City's Second Avenue (1975)
  - transportation, mixed-use development, housing, and industry in Long Island City (1976–1977)
  - architecture in Palestine under the British Mandate (1984)

== See also ==
- List of Israel Prize recipients
