= Ram Karmi =

Israeli architect (1931–2013)

- רם כרמי
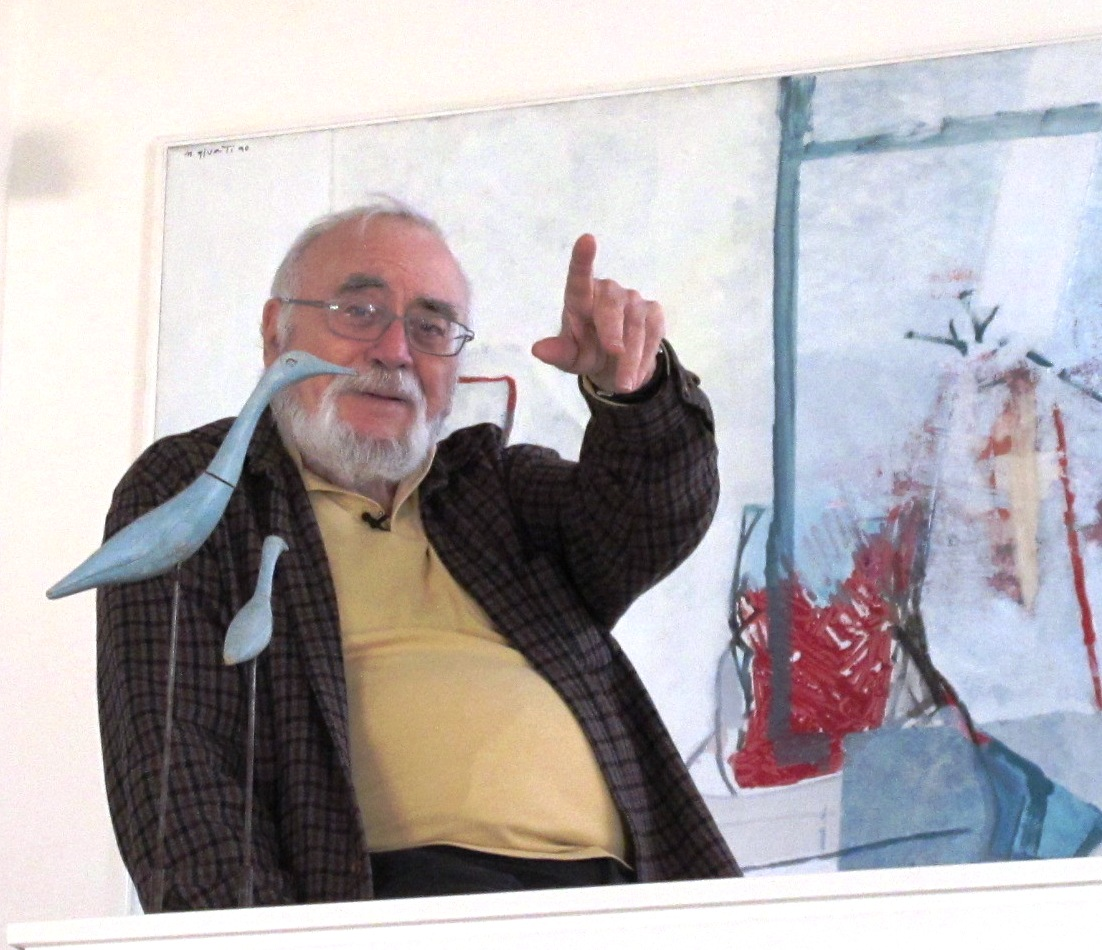
- Born: 1931; Jerusalem
- Died: 11 April 2013 (aged 81–82)
- Citizenship: Israeli
- Education: Avni Institute of Art and Design Technion
- Alma mater: Technion, Haifa, and Architectural Association School of Architecture, London
- Occupation: Architect
- Employer: Ram Karmi Architects Company
- Style: Brutalist
- Spouse: Rivka Karmi-Edry
- Children: 6

Ram Karmi (Hebrew: רם כרמי; 1931 – 11 April 2013) was an Israeli architect. He was head of the Tel Aviv-based Ram Karmi Architects company, and is known for his Brutalist style.

== Biography ==
Ram Karmi was born in Jerusalem. His father was architect Dov Karmi. Karmi grew up in Tel Aviv, served in the Israel Defense Forces in the 1948 Arab–Israeli War.

He studied visual art in the Avni Institute of Art and Design in 1947 following which he studied architecture at the Technion, Haifa, and Architectural Association School of Architecture, London in 1951–56. His father, Dov Karmi, was also an architect and won the Israel Prize in 1957. His sister, the architect Ada Karmi-Melamede, was also awarded the Israel Prize for architecture, in 2007. He was married to Rivka Karmi-Edry with whom he has a son and two daughters. He also has two sons and a daughter from a previous marriage.

== Architectural career ==
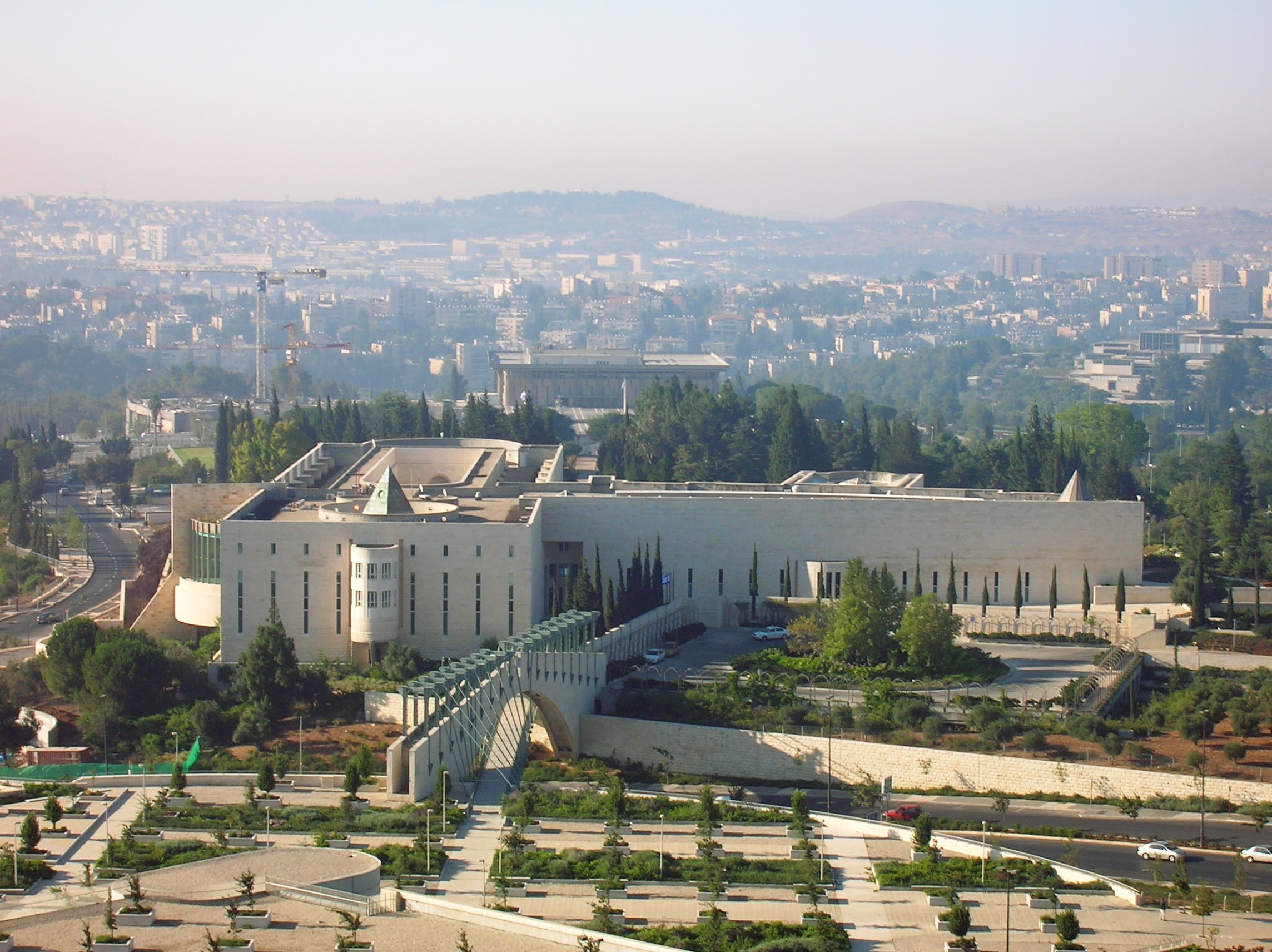
The Supreme Court of Israel building

Early in his career Ram Karmi was employed in his father's office where he worked on plans for the Knesset along with the design competition winner Joseph Klarwein. Karmi planned the Negev Center, Beersheba, in 1960 and El Al building, Tel Aviv, in 1963. He continued his architectural work while lecturing at the Technion, designing the Amal School in Tel Aviv and the Tel Aviv Central Bus Station.

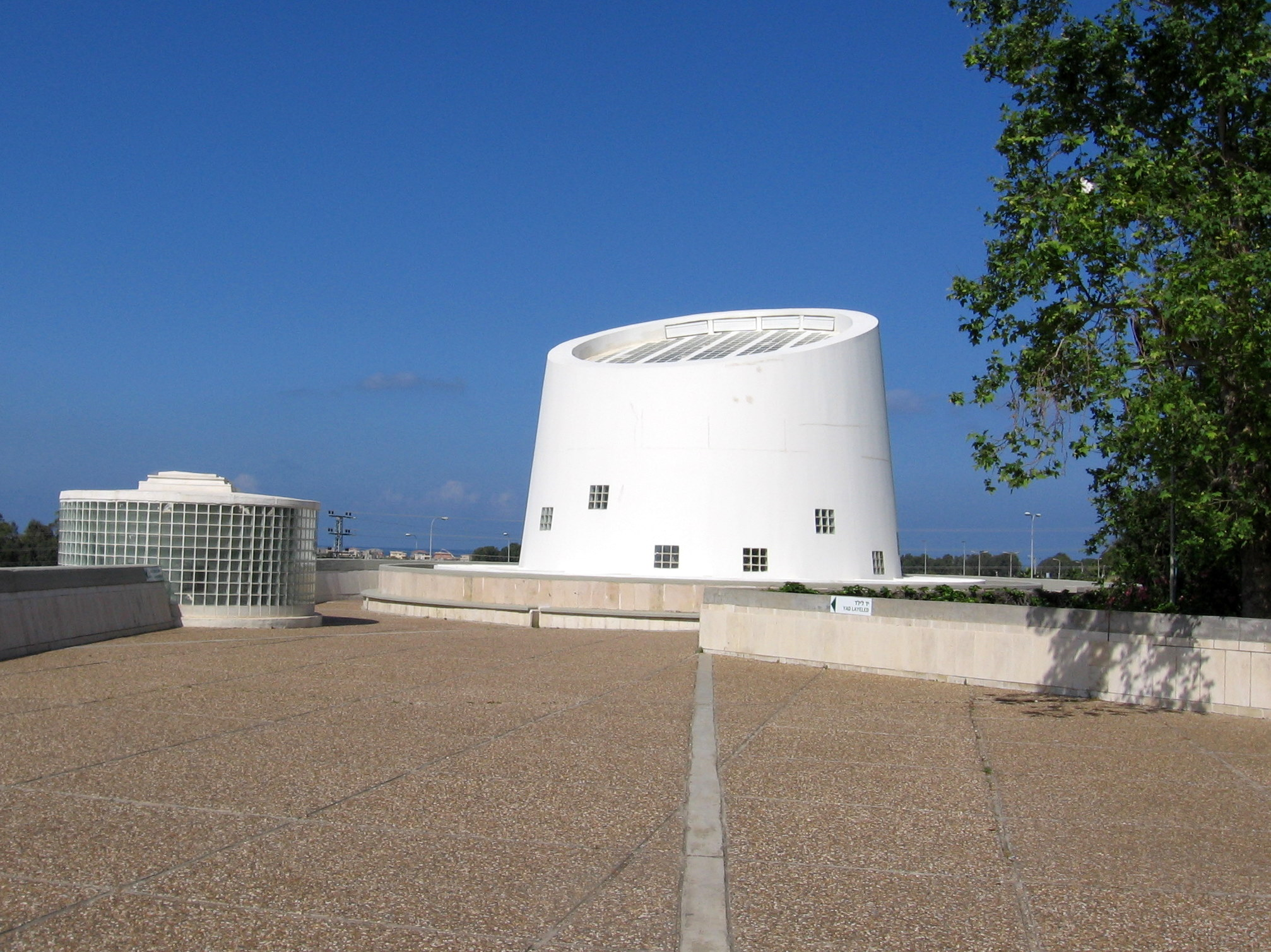
The Yad LaYeled Children's Museum

According to Karmi, after the 1967 Six-Day War, the changed atmosphere in Israeli society caused him to re-think his brutalist style. In 1974, Karmi voluntarily became the chief architect in the Housing and Construction Minister of Israel, a position he held until 1979, and worked to re-design the near-ubiquitous public housing projects in Israel. In 1981, he finished the Hecht Synagogue in Jerusalem.

In 1986 Karmi and his sister Ada Karmi-Melamede were invited to participate in the international competition for the design of the Supreme Court of Israel which they won. The building, designed by Karmi and Karmi-Melamede opened in 1992. New York Times architecture critic Paul Goldberger wrote of Karmi's design, "the sharpness of the Mediterranean architectural tradition and the dignity of the law are here married with remarkable grace." Beginning in 2007, Karmi was the architect in charge of renovating the Habima Theatre.

== Academic career ==
Karmi taught at the Technion, Haifa between 1964 and 1994. He lectured at MIT, Columbia University and the University of Houston.

Karmi was a full professor at the School of Architecture of Ariel University Center of Samaria.

== Criticism ==
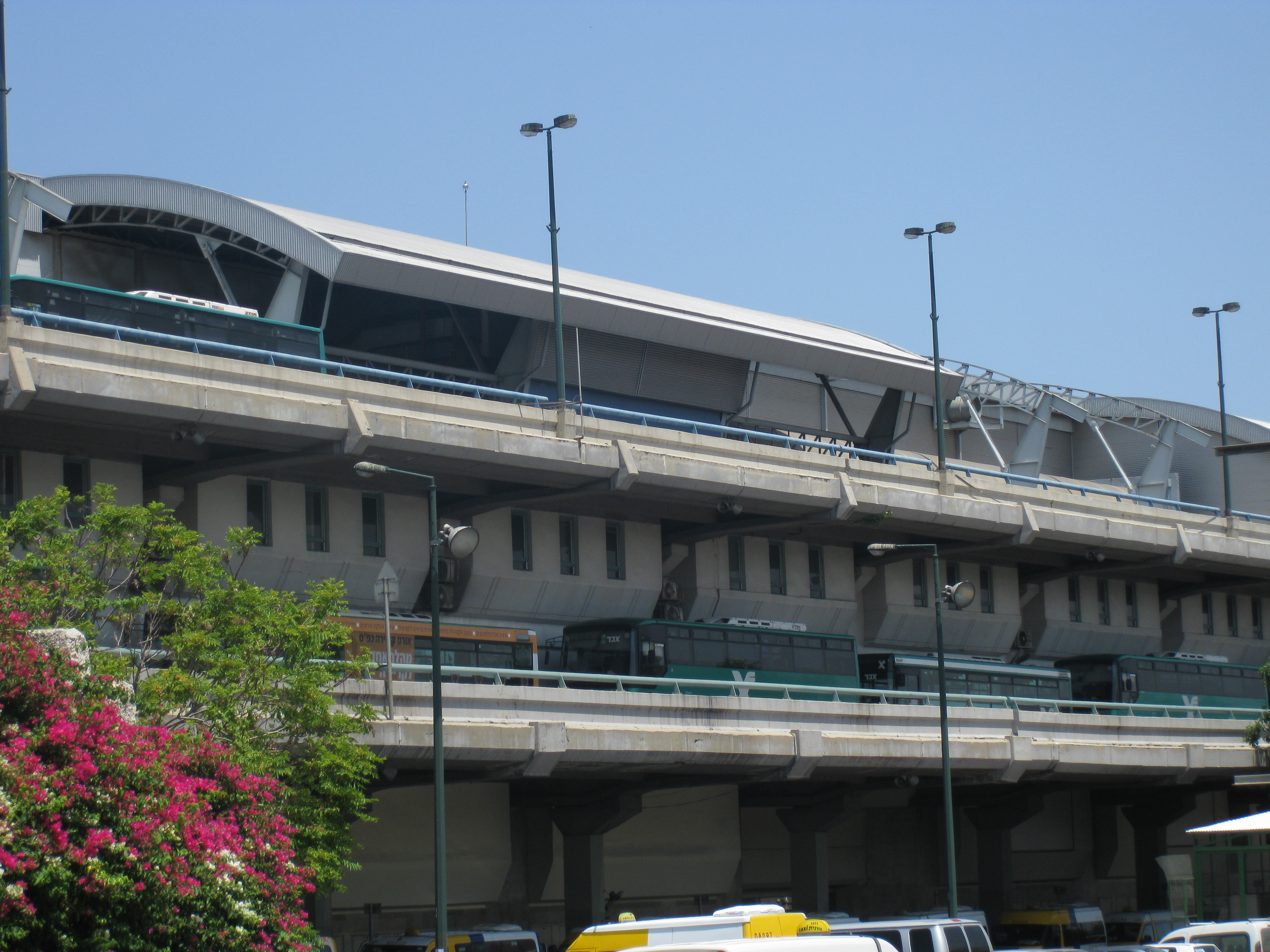
Tel Aviv bus station

The Tel Aviv Central Bus Station, which Karmi designed along with the architects Tzvi Komet and Ya'el Rothschild, has been criticized over the years for being a difficult to navigate bloated structure which destroyed the neighborhood it was built in, despite numerous improvements. In an interview, Haim Avigal, the CEO of the station from 2005, downplayed the navigation complaints, but said that "if I caught the architect who designed this building, I'd beat him up". In 2010, his renovation of Habima Theatre, which at the time was still under way after three years of development, was fiercely criticized.

Karmi was also involved in the Holyland Park project in Jerusalem, which is called the "Monster on the Hill" by many Jerusalemites.

== Awards and recognition ==
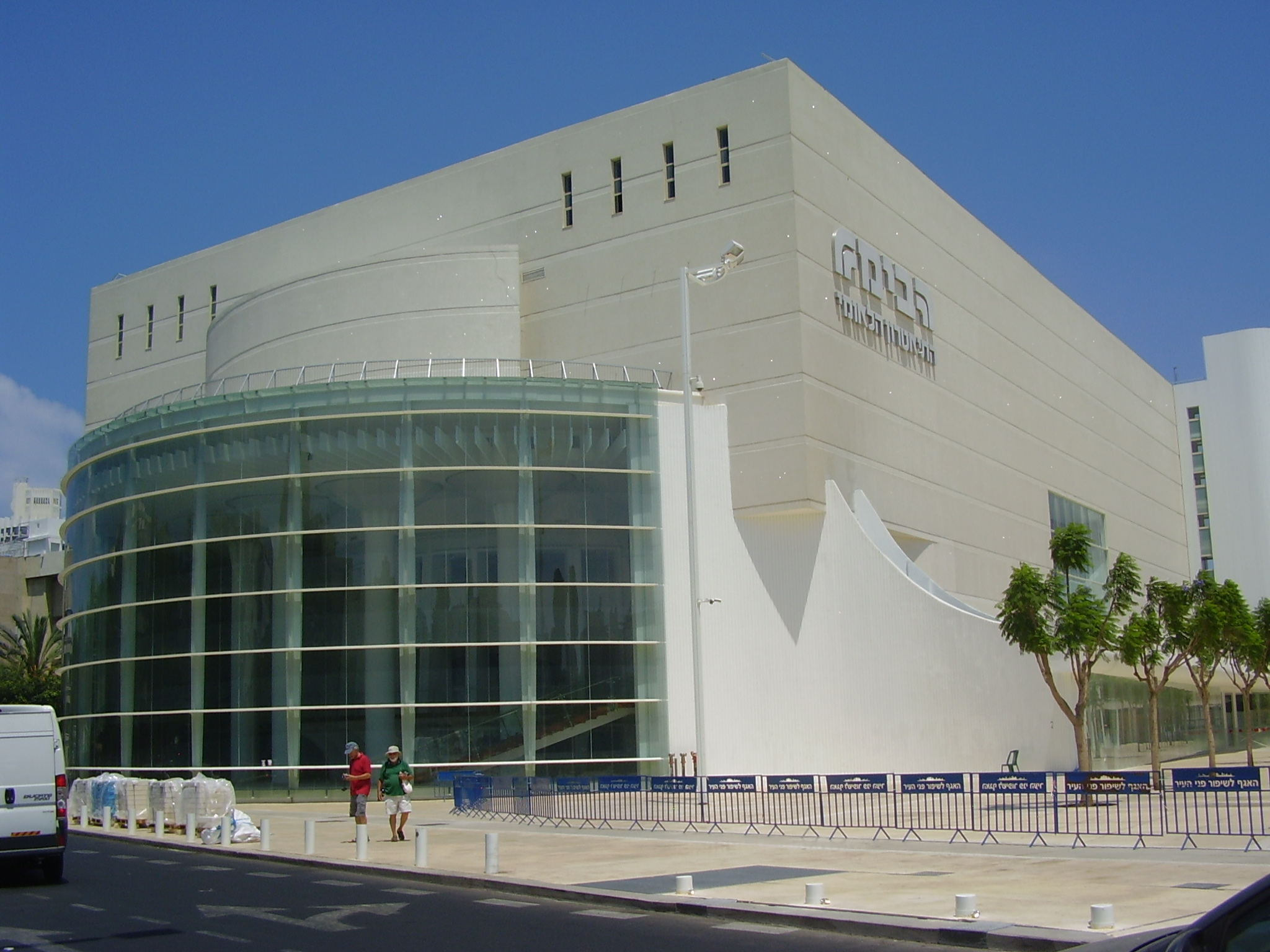
Habima Theater, Tel Aviv

Karmi won the following awards:

- Israel Prize, 2002 – for architecture.
- Rechter Prize:
  - 1967 – for the Negev Center in Beersheba;
  - 1999 – for the Children's Memorial (Yad LaYeled) in the Ghetto Fighters' House.
- Reinholds Prize, 1969 – for a mixed residential/commercial project in Beersheba.
- Rokach Prize:
  - 1965 – for the El Al building in Tel Aviv;
  - 1970 – for residential buildings in Be'eri St., Tel Aviv.

== Published works ==
- Adrikhalut Lirit (lit. Lyric Architecture) (2001). Israeli Ministry of Defense.

== See also ==
- List of Israel Prize recipients
