= Avigdor Shinan =

Czech-born Israeli academic (born 1946)

- אביגדור שנאן
- Born: Prague, Czech Republic
- Citizenship: Israeli
- Organization: Hebrew University of Jerusalem
- Known for: Jewish philosophy

Professor Avigdor Shinan (Hebrew: אביגדור שנאן) is the Yitzhak Becker professor emeritus Jewish Studies in the departments of Hebrew Literature, Yiddish and Comparative Jewish Folklore at the Hebrew University of Jerusalem. Shinan has served as head of the departments of General Studies, and of Hebrew Literature and as Dean of The Hebrew University. He has served as visiting professor at Yale, JTS, and Yeshiva University and has also taught at Ben-Gurion, Tel-Aviv, and at the Schechter Institute.

He retired in 2012.

== Biography ==
Born in Prague in 1946, he has been living in Israel since 1949. He completed his higher education at The Hebrew University, where he has been teaching since 1972 while engaged in his principal research fields: the literature of the Aggadah and the Midrash, the Aramaic translations of Scriptures and the history of the Siddur. He has published and over 140 articles in these various fields and more than ten books. Shinan also translated Yosef Dov Soloveitchik's books into Hebrew, and edited the popular journal "Et Ha-Da'at". He initiated a new series of books introducing a new "Israeli commentary" on several books of the Bible. He wrote/cowrote four- on the Book of Jonah, Song of Songs, Ecclesiastes, and Pirkei Avot (Ethics of the Fathers). He served as advisor to the Book of Esther, written by Rabbi Mishael Zion.

According to Haaretz newspaper, the Pirkei Avot book was a best seller when it appeared in 2009.

He also serves as an academic consultant for Keren Avi Chai and Beit Avi Chai in Jerusalem.

== Books ==
Shinan, A. This Man. Jesus Through Jewish Eyes (Hebrew), Ludwig Mayer, 1999

Shinan, A. The Avi Chai Siddur, 1999

Shinan, A. Midrash Shemot-rabah, parashot 1-14: Yotse la-or ʻal-pi ketav-yad shebi-Yerushalayim uve-tsado ḥilufe-nusḥaʼot, perush u-mavo (Hebrew Edition) Devir Publisher, 1984, ISBN 978-965-01-0139-8

Shinan, A. The World of the Aggadah, Jewish Lights Publications, 1990, ISBN 978-965-05-0497-7

Shinan, A. Targum ṿe-agadah bo: Ha-agadah be-Targum ha-Torah ha-Arami ha-meyuḥas le-Yonatan ben ʻUziʼel (Sidrat sefarim le-ḥeḳer ha-Miḳra mi-yesodo shel S. Sh. Peri) (Hebrew Edition) Magnes Publishers, 1992, ISBN 978-965-223-811-5

Shinan, A, Pirkei Avot a New Israeli Commentary, Yediot Sefarim, 2009, ISBN 978-965-482-920-5

Zakovitz, Y, Shinan, A. Gam lo kakh katuv baTanakh [Once again, That's not what the good book says] (Hebrew) Yediot Achronot Press, 2010, ISBN 978-965-545-032-3

Bilski, S, Shinan, A, Rupture and Repair in Art, Judaism, and Society (Shever veTikun: BaHagut Baomanut, Bachevra). Adi Foundation, 2010, ISBN 978-965-91584-0-9

Shinan, A., Zakovitch, Y. & Zakovitch, V., From Gods to God: How the Bible Debunked, Suppressed, or Changed Ancient Myths and Legends. Jewish Publication Society, 2012, ISBN 978-0-8276-0908-2

Zakovitz, Y, Shinan, A. The Book of Jonah, a New Israeli Commentary (Hebrew), Yediot Sefarim, 2015, ISBN 978-965-564-093-9

Zakovitz, Y, Shinan, A. Song of Songs, a New Israeli Commentary (Hebrew), Yediot Sefarim, 2020, ISBN 978-965-201-178-7

Shinan, A, Ecclesiastes, a New Israeli Commentary (Hebrew) Yediot Sefarim, 2021, ISBN 978-965-201-367-5

== Key recent publications ==
- Shinan A ( Ed) The Wisdom of the Sages: Biblical commentary in Rabbinic literature - presented to Hananel Maco (translated from Hebrew) Carmel Press, Jerusalem, 2019
- Shinan, A. & Zakovitch, Y., Why is "A" placed next to "B"? Juxtaposition in the bible and beyond, Tradition, Transmission, and Transformation from Second Temple Literature through Judaism and Christianity in Late Antiquity: Proceedings of the Thirteenth International Symposium of the Orion Center for the Study of the Dead Sea Scrolls and Associated Literature: Jointly Sponsored by the Hebrew University Center for the Study of Christianity, 22-24 February, 2011. Brill Academic Publishers, p. 322-342 21 p. (Studies on the Texts of the Desert of Judah; vol. 113). 2015
- Shinan, A.,Where is Jonah from? in Jesus Among the Jews: Representation and Thought. Taylor and Francis, p. 36-45 1 Jan 2012
- Shinan, A., Kasher, R., Marmur, M. & Flesher, P. V. M., 2011, Michael Klein on the Targums: Collected Essays 1972-2002. Shinan, A., Kasher, R., Flesher, P. V. M. & Marmur, M. (eds.). Brill Academic Publishers, p. 1-331 331 p. (Studies in the Aramaic Interpretation of Scripture; vol. 11).
- Shinan, A., 2007, Early translations in the Semitic languages: From Hebrew into Aramaic Handbücher zur Sprach- und Kommunikationswissenschaft. Kittel, H., Frank, A. P., Greiner, N., Hermans, T., Koller, W., Lambert, J. & Paul, F. (eds.). Walter de Gruyter GmbH, p. 1182-1186 5 p. (Handbücher zur Sprach- und Kommunikationswissenschaft; vol. 2).
- Shinan, A., The late midrashic, paytanic, and targumic literature, The Cambridge History of Judaism: Volume IV the Late Roman-Rabbinic Period. Cambridge University Press, p. 678-698 21 p. 1 Jan 2006
