= Avi Chai Foundation =

American Jewish private foundation

The Avi Chai Foundation
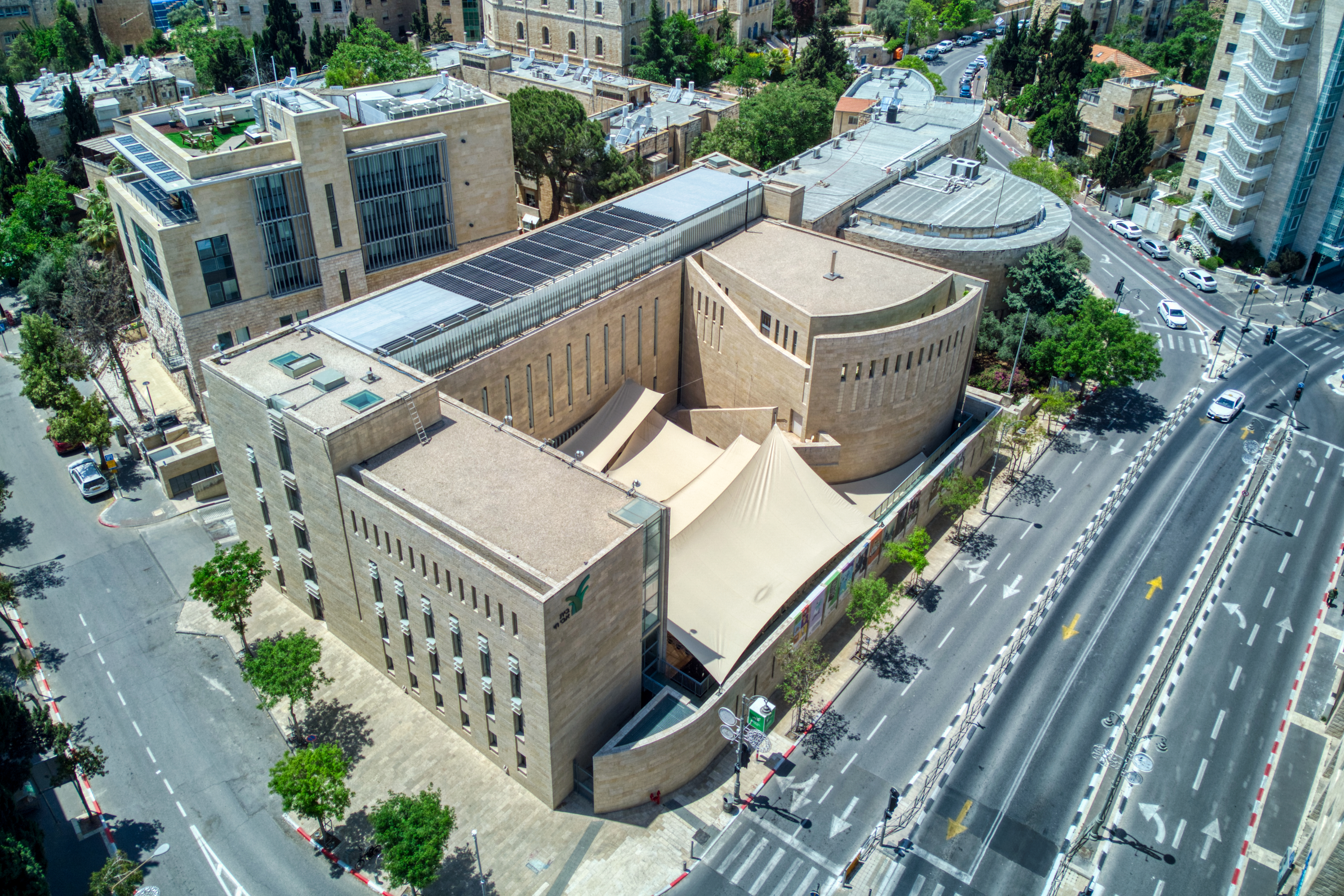
- Beit Avi Chai in Jerusalem
- Formation: 1984; 42 years ago
- Founder: Zalman Bernstein
- Type: Private foundation
- Tax ID no.: 13-3252800
- Headquarters: New York City, United States
- Fields: Jewish education and culture
- Revenue: $16,496,545 (2024)
- Disbursements: $16,999,060 (2024)
- Expenses: $18,131,369 (2024)
- Website: avichai.org

The Avi Chai Foundation is an American private foundation established in 1984 by Zalman Bernstein, an investor and founder of Sanford C. Bernstein & Company. It supported Jewish educational and cultural initiatives in Israel, North America, and the former Soviet Union. Its North American grantmaking focused primarily on Jewish day schools and overnight summer camps.

Following a planned spend-down, Avi Chai concluded its general grantmaking on December 31, 2019, but remained in existence. The foundation retained an endowment for Beit Avi Chai, its Jerusalem cultural center. Established by the foundation in 2007, Beit Avi Chai presents discussions, lectures, exhibitions, workshops, musical and theatrical productions, and online programming focused on Jewish and Israeli culture and education.

== History and mission ==
Bernstein founded the investment management firm Sanford C. Bernstein & Company in 1967 and served as its chief executive officer. His father's death later marked a turning point in his Jewish life. Although he could then read little Hebrew, his determination to recite Kaddish led him to Lincoln Square Synagogue in Manhattan, where he met Rabbi Shlomo Riskin. Riskin became a major influence on Bernstein's Jewish development, and Bernstein became increasingly involved in Jewish study and religious observance.

In 1984, Bernstein established the Avi Chai Foundation in collaboration with two friends whom he considered more knowledgeable about Jewish life. The foundation's mission was to strengthen Jewish tradition and Jewish literacy, deepen commitment to the State of Israel, and promote mutual understanding among Jews of different religious orientations.

Marvin Schick wrote that Bernstein held strong opinions but welcomed and respected contrary views. He described the foundation's mission as drawing on Bernstein's understanding of Rabbi Abraham Isaac Kook's teachings, including attachment to Israel, commitment to Jewish religious tradition, and mutual understanding among Jews of differing religious backgrounds and levels of observance.

The foundation conducted grantmaking in North America and Israel before expanding its activities to the former Soviet Union in 2001.

== Grantmaking programs ==
The foundation's grantmaking priorities differed by region in response to local educational and communal circumstances.

=== North America ===
In North America, the foundation focused on Jewish day schools and overnight summer camps, framing its work around Jewish literacy, religious purposefulness, Jewish peoplehood, and connection to Israel. By 1997, it was contributing more than $3 million annually to Jewish day schools. It also supported professional development for educators and school leaders, helped establish Jewish high schools, and funded preparatory programs for students entering Jewish high schools without prior day-school education.

Later initiatives included developing Hebrew-language and Jewish-studies curricula, supporting the organizational development of day schools, providing loans for school and camp renovations and expansions, and using matching programs to attract new donations. By the end of its general grantmaking, the foundation had distributed $339 million in North American grants, including $247 million to day schools and $34 million to camps, and had provided $158 million in interest-free loans for school and camp capital projects.

=== Israel ===
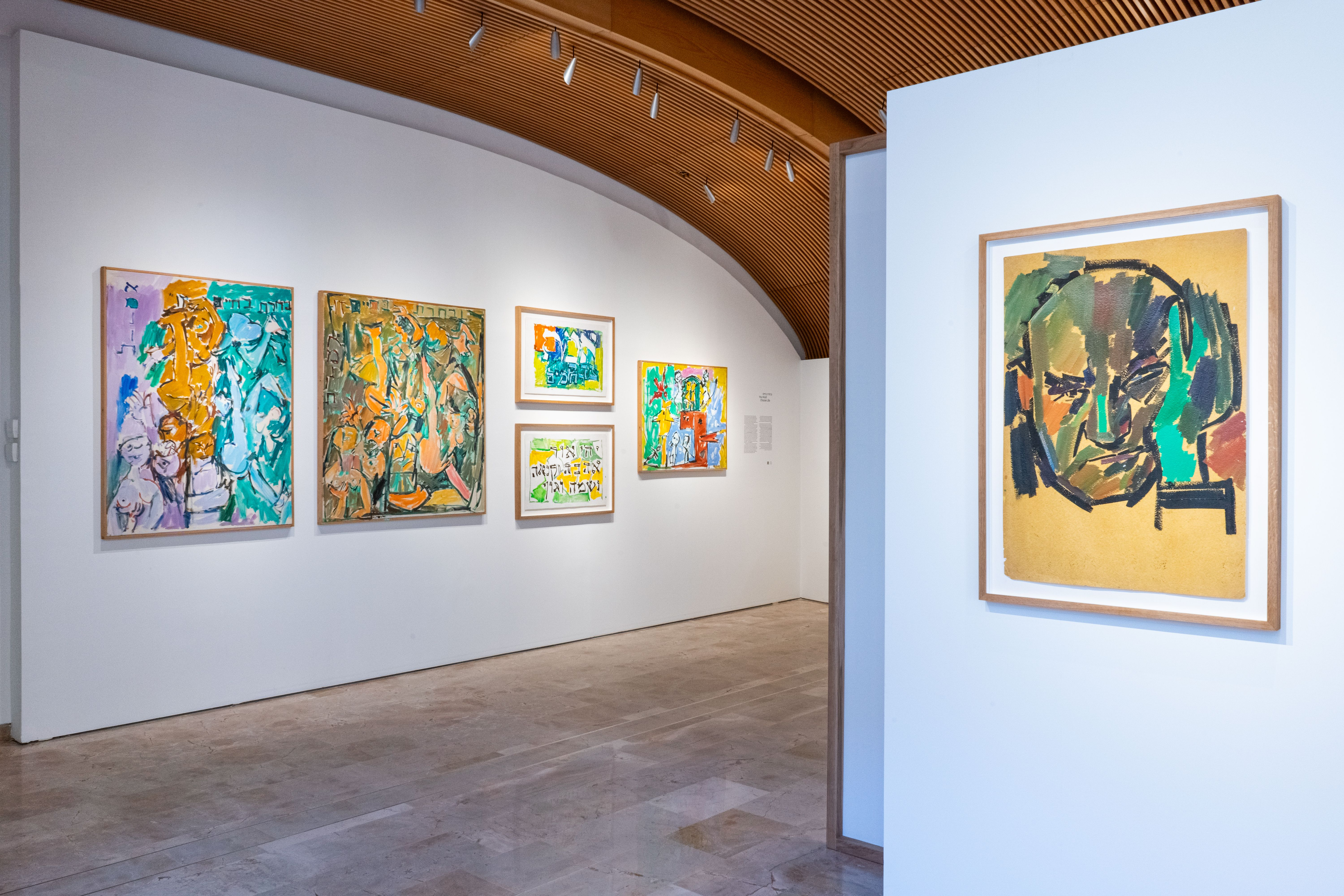
Pinchas Litvinovsky exhibition at Beit Avi Chai's Art Gallery (2024).

In Israel, Avi Chai's grantmaking focused on formal and informal Jewish education and adult learning. The foundation sought to encourage understanding among Jews with differing commitments to Jewish tradition, increase Jewish literacy among secular Israelis, and cultivate Jewish leadership. The foundation divided this work into three broad areas: informal Jewish study for secular adults, the promotion of Jewish culture through media, especially television, and the enhancement of Jewish studies in the nonreligious state school system. Its work in formal education included teacher preparation, professional development, curriculum development, and school-wide educational initiatives.

In 2007, the foundation established the Jerusalem-based Beit Avi Chai as a center for Jewish and Israeli education and culture. Intended to serve a broad spectrum of Israeli society, it offers discussions, lectures, workshops, Jewish-text study, theatrical productions, films, articles, and other digital content. Beit Avi Chai also collaborates with other organizations, cultural institutions, and municipalities throughout Israel to broaden the reach and impact of its educational and cultural programs and extend these initiatives to communities beyond Jerusalem.

One element of Avi Chai's educational strategy in Israel was its support for Jewish learning among people active in Israeli arts and culture. The foundation provided substantial support for Alma, a Tel Aviv-based institution that made the study of Jewish texts accessible to secular artists and cultural professionals. Participants were encouraged to draw on this learning as inspiration for their creative work.

Avi Chai's Film and Television Project began operating in Israel in 1999 to support the development and early financing of film and television productions, increase Jewish content, and encourage more complex portrayals of religious Israeli life than had previously appeared on screen. The project's first major initiative was a collaboration with the Gesher Multicultural Film Fund. Scholar Galeet Dardashti argued that Avi Chai's media projects helped increase Jewish content on Israeli television and encouraged more complex, less stereotypical portrayals of religious and ultra-Orthodox Israelis.

Around 2010, the foundation began developing the Nitzanim initiative in ten Israeli communities. The initiative was intended to connect educational and cultural institutions through coordinated local planning involving municipal officials and community leaders.

Avi Chai distributed approximately $208.5 million in grants in Israel from 1986 through 2018. This total does not include funding for Beit Avi Chai, which received an additional $63 million between 2006 and 2018. The largest shares of the foundation's Israeli grantmaking went toward Jewish study and literacy and programs promoting mutual understanding and responsibility among Israeli Jews of different backgrounds.

=== Former Soviet Union ===
In the former Soviet Union, the foundation supported Jewish schools, overnight summer camps, Hebrew-language education, and other programs intended to strengthen Jewish knowledge, identity, and communal participation after decades of restrictions on Jewish religious and cultural life under Soviet rule. Its grants also funded curriculum development for Jewish schools and summer camps, academic Jewish studies departments, and the Jewish Studies Center (Sefer) at the Russian Academy of Sciences. Cultural and educational outreach included social media, Jewish-themed publications, and the Booknik website.

Writing about Jewish schools in the region more broadly, Gitelman observed that, unlike Jewish schools in many Western communities, those in the former Soviet Union operated without much of the surrounding family, communal, religious, and cultural infrastructure that supported Jewish education. He also noted the lack of comprehensive research assessing the schools' effects on students, parents, and communities.

As the smallest of Avi Chai's three regional programs, the former Soviet Union program had annual expenditures of approximately $4–5 million. In 2011, it represented roughly 10 percent of Avi Chai's overall grantmaking budget. Almost three-quarters of the annual FSU budget went to the broad category of "Engaging Unaffiliated Jews in the FSU", which included websites, cultural and literary events, and Jewish book publishing aimed at reaching unaffiliated Jews. The next-largest expenditure area was day schools and the TaL AM Hebrew-language curriculum, while academic Jewish-studies programs constituted the smallest of the three principal budget categories.

== Spend-down and continuing operations ==
After Bernstein's death in 1999, the foundation's board announced in 2005 that, in keeping with a wish he had expressed informally, it would spend down its assets by 2020. The foundation concluded its general grantmaking on December 31, 2019.

In 2009, Avi Chai's trustees and program staff undertook a comprehensive assessment of the foundation's grantmaking initiatives, ranking them according to their importance to its mission. The board then determined which grants would continue at existing levels, which would be reduced, and which would end. The review responded both to the approaching spend-down and to the global financial downturn, and was intended to concentrate diminished resources on the initiatives considered most important while retaining some flexibility for new opportunities.

In 2011, the trustees moved away from Avi Chai's earlier practice of funding major initiatives largely on its own and began seeking other foundations and philanthropists as partners, with the aim of improving the prospects that supported organizations and initiatives would continue after Avi Chai's general grantmaking ended.

By 2019, several initiatives had obtained commitments for continuing support from other foundations, individual philanthropists, or government bodies. The foundation also retained an endowment for Beit Avi Chai, which continued to receive foundation support after general grantmaking ended.

== Bibliography ==
- Dardashti, Galeet (2015), "Televised Agendas: How Global Funders Make Israeli TV More "Jewish"", Jewish Film & New Media, 3 (1), Wayne State University Press: 77–103
- Fleishman, Joel L. (2011), Gearing Up to Spend Down: A Foundation in the Midst of Paradigm Shifts (PDF), Year Two Report on the Concluding Years of the AVI CHAI Foundation, Durham, North Carolina: Center for Strategic Philanthropy and Civil Society, Sanford School of Public Policy, Duke University
- Fleishman, Joel L. (2019), Against Strong Headwinds: The AVI CHAI Foundation's Bold Vision and Relentless Persistence Succeeded in Strengthening Jewishness in Countless Measurable Initiatives (PDF), Final Report on the Concluding Years of the AVI CHAI Foundation, Durham, North Carolina: Center for Strategic Philanthropy and Civil Society, Sanford School of Public Policy, Duke University
- Gitelman, Zvi (2009), "Do Jewish Schools Make a Difference in the Former Soviet Union?", in Pomson, Alex; Deitcher, Howard (eds.), Jewish Day Schools, Jewish Communities: A Reconsideration, Oxford: The Littman Library of Jewish Civilization, pp. 109–138
- Hamo, Nurit; Gilat, Itzik; Dushnik, Liron; Babchik, Tzipi; Ifergan, Itai (October 2019), סיפורה של קרן אבי חי בחינוך הפורמלי: סיכום רפלקטיבי [The Story of the Avi Chai Foundation in Formal Education: A Reflective Summary] (PDF) (in Hebrew), Levinsky College of Education
- Hanau, Shira (November 13, 2019), "Avi Chai Says Goodbye, But Not 'Mission Accomplished'", New York Jewish Week, Jewish Telegraphic Agency
- Lipman, Steve (January 15, 1999), "Sanford Bernstein's Second Life", New York Jewish Week, Jewish Telegraphic Agency
- Mandel, Saundra (August 27, 1997), "Foundations Target Jewish Education", Jewish Telegraphic Agency
- Schick, Marvin (2007), "Bernstein, Zalman Chaim", Encyclopaedia Judaica (2nd ed.), Gale – via Encyclopedia.com
