= Non-carbon nanotube =

Extremely small cylinder not made with carbon atoms

A non-carbon nanotube is a cylindrical molecule often composed of metal oxides, or group 13-Nitrides, such as BN, AlN, GaN and morphologically similar to a carbon nanotube. Non-carbon nanotubes have been observed to occur naturally in some mineral deposits.

A few years after Linus Pauling mentioned the possibility of curved layers in minerals as early as 1930, some minerals such as white asbestos (or chrysotile) and imogolite were actually shown to have a tubular structure. However, the first synthetic non-carbon nanotubes did not appear until Reshef Tenne et al. reported the synthesis of nanotubes composed of tungsten disulfide (WS_{2}) in 1992.

In the intervening years, nanotubes have been synthesised of many non-carbon materials, such as vanadium oxide and manganese oxide, and are being researched for such applications as redox catalysts and cathode materials for batteries.

== History and occurrence ==
Non-carbon nanotubes are morphologically similar to carbon nanotubes and are observed in some mineral deposits of natural origin. Synthetic structures of this type were first reported by the group of Reshef Tenne in 1992.

== Materials ==
Typical non-carbon nanotube materials are 2D layered solids such as tungsten(IV) sulfide (WS_{2}), molybdenum disulfide (MoS_{2}) and tin(IV) sulfide (SnS_{2}). WS_{2} and SnS_{2}/tin(II) sulfide (SnS) nanotubes have been synthesized in macroscopic amounts. However, traditional ceramics like titanium dioxide (TiO_{2}), zirconium dioxide (ZrO_{2}) and zinc oxide (ZnO) also form non-carbon nanotubes. More recent nanotube and nanowire materials are transition metal/chalcogen/halogenides (TMCH), described by the formula TM_{6}C_{y}H_{z}, where TM is transition metal (molybdenum, tungsten, tantalum, niobium), C is chalcogen (sulfur, selenium, tellurium), H is halogen (iodine), and the composition is given by 8.2<(y+z)<10. TMCH tubes can have a subnanometer-diameter, lengths tunable from hundreds of nanometers to tens of micrometers and show excellent dispersiveness owing to extremely weak mechanical coupling between the tubes.

In 2007, Chinese scientists announced the creation in the laboratory of copper and bismuth nanotubes.

== Properties and potential applications ==
Non-carbon nanotubes are an alternative material to better-explored carbon nanotubes, showing advantages such as easy synthetic access and high crystallinity, good uniformity and dispersion, predefined electrical conductivity depending on the composition of the starting material and needle-like morphology, good adhesion to a number of polymers and high impact-resistance. They are therefore promising candidates as fillers for polymer composites with enhanced thermal, mechanical, and electrical properties. Target applications for this kind of composites are materials for heat management, electrostatic dissipators, wear protection materials, photovoltaic elements, etc. Non-carbon nanotubes are heavier than carbon nanotubes and not as strong under tensile stress, but they are particularly strong under compression, leading to potential applications in impact-resistant applications such as bulletproof vests.

The mechanical strength of cellulose fibers can be increased by an order of magnitude by adding only 0.1 wt% of TMCH nanotubes, and measurements of electrical conductivity of polycaprolactone doped with TMCH nanotubes revealed a percolative behavior with an extremely low percolation threshold. The addition of WS_{2} nanotubes to epoxy resin improved adhesion, fracture toughness and strain energy release rate. The wear of the nanotubes-reinforced epoxy was eight times lower than that of pure epoxy. WS_{2} nanotubes were also embedded into a poly(methyl methacrylate) (PMMA) nanofiber matrix via electrospinning. The nanotubes were well dispersed and aligned along fiber axis. The enhanced stiffness and toughness of PMMA fiber meshes by means of non-carbon nanotubes addition may have potential applications as impact-absorbing materials.

Optical properties of semiconductor quantum dot–non-carbon nanotube hybrids reveal efficient resonant energy transfer from the quantum dot to the non-carbon nanotubes upon photoexcitation. Nanodevices based on one-dimensional nanomaterials are thought for next-generation electronic and photoelectronic systems having small size, faster transport speed, higher efficiency and less energy consumption. A high-speed photodetector for visible and near-infrared light based on individual WS_{2} nanotubes has been prepared in laboratory. Non-carbon nanotubes are hollow and can be filled with another material, to preserve or guide it to a desired location or generate new properties in the filler material which is confined within a nanometer-scale diameter. To this goal, non-carbon nanotube hybrids were made by filling WS_{2} nanotubes with molten lead, antimony or bismuth iodide salt by a capillary wetting process, resulting in PbI_{2}@WS_{2}, SbI_{3}@WS_{2} or BiI_{3}@WS_{2} core–shell nanotubes.

== Biomedical applications ==
Tungsten disulfide nanotubes have been investigated as reinforcing agents to improve the mechanical properties of biodegradable polymeric nanocomposites for bone tissue engineering applications. Addition of ~0.02 weight % of tungsten disulfide nanotubes significantly improved the compression and flexural mechanical properties of poly(propylene fumarate) nanocomposites, greater than carbon nanotubes. This was attributed to increased dispersion of tungsten disulfide nanotubes in the polymer matrix enabling efficient load transfer from the matrix to the underlying nanostructure.

== See also ==
- Nanowire
- Tungsten(IV) sulfide § Nanotubes
- Titanium dioxide § Nanotubes
