= Menahem Yaari =

Israeli economist

- מנחם יערי
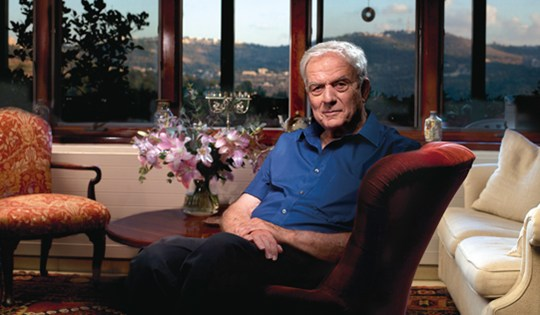
- Menahem Yaari (2012)
- Born: Menahem E. Yaari; April 26, 1935 (age 91); Jerusalem, Mandatory Palestine
- Education: Hebrew University of Jerusalem (BA); Stanford University (PhD)
- Title: S.A. Schonbrunn Professor of Mathematical Economics at The Hebrew University of Jerusalem; President of the Open University of Israel (1992-1997); President of the Israel Academy of Sciences and Humanities (since 2004)
- Awards: Israel Prize (1987); Rothschild Prize in the Social Sciences (1994); EMET Prize in the Social Sciences (2012)

Menahem E. Yaari (Hebrew: מנחם יערי; born April 26, 1935) is an Israeli economist who has been the S.A. Schonbrunn Professor of Mathematical Economics at The Hebrew University of Jerusalem and was the President of the Open University of Israel from 1992 to 1997. He was awarded the Israel Prize in 1987, the Rothschild Prize in the Social Sciences in 1994, and the EMET Prize in the Social Sciences in 2012.

== Biography ==
Yaari was born in Jerusalem in Mandatory Palestine.

He obtained a B.A. in Economics and Philosophy from The Hebrew University of Jerusalem in 1958, and a Ph.D. in Economics and Statistics from Stanford University in 1962.

From 1962 to 1967 Yaari was an Assistant Professor and Associate Professor at Yale University in New Haven, Connecticut, and a member of the Cowles Foundation for Research in Economics at the university.

From 1967 to 1970 he was a Senior Lecturer and Associate Professor of Economics and Philosophy of Science at the Hebrew University of Jerusalem. Since 1971 Yaari has been the S.A. Schonbrunn Professor of Mathematical Economics at the university (emeritus since 1998), and from 1971 to 1973 he was the Chairman of the university's Department of Economics.

From 1968 to 1975 Yaari was an editor of Econometrica.

Since 1969 he has been a Fellow of the Econometric Society, since 1988 Yaari has been a foreign Member of the American Academy of Arts and Sciences, since 1991 he has been a Member of the Israel Academy of Sciences and Humanities, since 1993 he has been a foreign honorary member of the American Economic Association, since 1996 he has been a Fellow of the Berlin-Brandenburg Academy of Sciences. He has been the founding Member of The International Scientific Council of IPSO (Israeli-Palestinian Science Organization) since 2003, the President of the Israel Academy of Sciences and Humanities from 2004 to 2010, and a Member of the American Philosophical Society since 2008.

Yaari was awarded the Israel Prize in 1987, the Rothschild Prize in the Social Sciences in 1994, and the EMET Prize in the Social Sciences in 2012.

He was the director of Israel Institute for Advanced Studies. Thereafter, he was the President of the Open University of Israel from 1992 to 1997, following Nehemia Levtzion, and was succeeded by Eliahu Nissim.

== Selected publications ==
- Yaari, M. E. (1965). Uncertain lifetime, life insurance, and the theory of the consumer. The Review of Economic Studies, 32(2), 137-150.
- Yaari, M. E. (1987). The dual theory of choice under risk. Econometrica: Journal of the Econometric Society, 95-115.
- Yaari, M. E., & Bar-Hillel, M. (1984). On dividing justly. Social choice and welfare, 1(1), 1-24.
