= Gershon Ben-Shakhar =

Israeli psychologist

- גרשון בן שחר
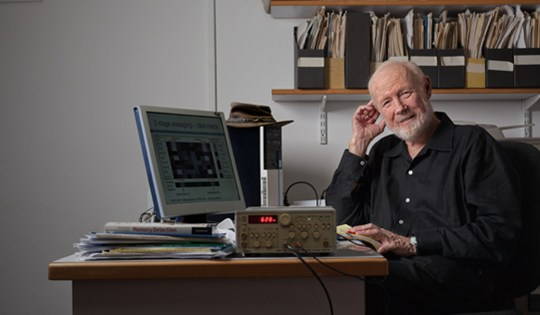
- Born: 25 May 1942
- Died: 11 February 2026 (aged 83)
- Education: The Hebrew University of Jerusalem (B.A. in Psychology and Statistics (1966), M.A. in Psychology (1970), Ph.D. in Psychology (1975); Northwestern University (Post-Doctoral Fellow, 1975-1976)
- Known for: President of the Open University of Israel
- Awards: EMET Prize; Israel Prize

Gershon Ben-Shakhar (Hebrew: גרשון בן שחר; born May 25, 1942, died February 11, 2026) was an Israeli psychologist. He served as president of the Open University of Israel. He received the Israel Prize in 2024.

== Academic career ==
Gershon Ben-Shakhar earned a B.A. in Psychology and Statistics (1966), an M.A. in Psychology (1970), and a Ph.D. in Psychology (1975) from The Hebrew University of Jerusalem. He was a Post-Doctoral Fellow at Northwestern University in Evanston, Illinois, from 1975 to 1976.

Ben-Shakhar taught in the Department of Psychology at The Hebrew University of Jerusalem from 1981 on, ultimately as a Professor and for a time as the Chair of the Department and the Dean of the Faculty of Social Sciences.

In 2003 he became president of the Open University of Israel, succeeding Eliahu Nissim.

== Published works ==
Along with John J. Furedy he wrote the book Theories and Applications in the Detection of Deception: A psychophysiological and international perspective (New York: Springer-Verlag, 1990).

== Awards and recognition ==
In 2011 he was an EMET Prize Laureate.

In 2024, he was received the Israel Prize for research in psychology for his significant contribution to the field.
