= United States factor =

The United States factor is a view of modern history that promotes the United States as the contingent reason for the Allied Powers winning both world wars and for preventing any powerful rival political regime from becoming mainstream in the 21st century world.

== Background ==
Azar Gat, argues that this "United States Factor" is both widely overlooked and the reason for democracy's victory over totalitarianism in the 20th century. According to the United States factor notion, "if it were not for the existence of the USA the liberal democracies would most probably have lost the great struggles of the twentieth century."

== United States factor in history ==
The 20th century did appear to witness what many theorists have seen as the end of the battles of political ideology, with the political model of liberal democracy coming out on top. Indeed, political scientists, including Francis Fukuyama, hailed the fall of the Soviet Union as the "end of history" in which the ideological evolution and the universalization of Western liberal democracy [becomes] the final form of human government." (See End of History and the Last Man)

In the view of the United States factor, this "end of history" is made possible only because the US was in a unique space economically, geographically, politically, and militarily throughout the 20th century that made it possible for the United States to "rescue" the Old World powers from the threat of totalitarianism. These menaces included both right wing totalitarian regimes, such as Nazism, as well as left wing totalitarianism—better known as Soviet-era Communism. (See State ideology of the Soviet Union.)

Though Gat acknowledges that the victory of democracy over totalitarianism was not necessarily "preordained" at the outset of either World War, he goes on to remark that the sheer fact that the US existed gave liberal democracies their "edge" in the battle against totalitarian regimes. This was achieved mainly by the US's contributions to the European Allies' war efforts from a distant location that was geographically large and politically united.

== American exceptionalism ==
This is a view of modern history that fits within the political theory of American exceptionalism. American exceptionalism, as defined by Jentleson, is a theory that holds that the United States possesses an inherent uniqueness and "special virtue" that is rooted in American principles and can be traced throughout American history. The idea that the United States is exceptional, or extraordinary, simply because it is the United States is a political philosophy that has been in existence for several decades and is a leading contributor to contemporary American political culture. (See Politics of the United States.)

== Competing views ==
There are many other ideas as to the behaviors of states and how they react and interact in the world. Such views that provide alternate theories to American exceptionalism and the United States factor include realism, constructivism, and idealism, just to name a few. These are some of the popular theories used in today's discussions about international relations. They put emphasis on states' behaviors and how to forecast potential outcomes of the entire spectrum of international affairs, from militarized conflict to diplomacy.
