= EMET Prize =

Israeli award for academic/professional excellence

- Awarded for: excellence in science, art, and culture in Israel
- Country: Israel
- Presented by: EMN Foundation
- Established: 2002
- Website: emetprize.com

The EMET Prize for Art, Science and Culture (Hebrew: פרס א.מ.ת) is an annual Israeli award presented for excellence in academic and professional achievements that have made a significant contribution to society. Established in 2002, the prize is sponsored by the EMN Foundation for the Advancement of Science, Art and Culture in Israel, in cooperation with the Prime Minister of Israel.

Prizes are awarded across five categories: the Exact Sciences, Life Sciences, Social Sciences, Humanities, and Arts and Culture. The award, which carries a total purse of one million dollars, is open to Israeli citizens and in certain cases non-citizens residing in Israel. The EMET Prize is administered by a professional committee composed of representatives appointed by the Prime Minister and the EMN Foundation.

== EMET Prize Laureates ==
Year	Category	Laureate(s)
2022	Life Sciences	Brain Research: Hermona Soreq, Rafael Malach
2022	Social Sciences	Law: Ruth Lapidoth, Amnon Rubinstein
2022	Humanities	Archeology: Oded Lipschits, Gideon Shelach-Lavi
2020	Exact Sciences	Nano technology: Reshef Tenne, Yechezkel Barenholtz
2020	Life Sciences	Biochemistry: Dan Tawfik
2020	Social Sciences	Psychology: Ruth Feldman
2020	Humanities	Biblical Research: Devorah Dimant, Eliezer Greenstein
2020	Culture and Arts	Architecture: Bracha Chyutin, Shamai Asif
2019	Exact Sciences	Physics: Mordechai Segev; Space Research: Tsvi Piran
2019	Life Sciences	Bio-Medicine: Michal Schwartz, Yair Reisner, Yinon Ben-Neriah
2019	Social Sciences	Political Science: Azar Gat, Avner de Shalit
2019	Humanities	History: Mechal Sobel, Benjamin Z. Kedar
2019	Culture and Arts	Translation: Hannah Amit-Kochavi, David Weinfeld
2018	Exact Sciences	Chemistry: Meir Lahav, Leslie Leiserowitz
2018	Life Sciences	Genetics: Hanna Engelberg-Kulka, Ephrat Levy-Lahad
2018	Social Sciences	Sociology: Eva Illouz; Anthropology: Hanna Herzog
2018	Humanities	Jewish Law: Nahum Rakover
2018	Culture and Arts	Photography: Michal Rovner, Sharon Yaari
2017	Exact Sciences	Computer Engineering: Jacob Ziv
2017	Life Sciences	Cancer Research: Zelig Eshhar, Alexander Levitzki
2017	Social Sciences	Economics: Assaf Razin
2017	Humanities	Philosophy: David Heyd
2017	Culture and Arts	Theater: Oded Kotler, Yevgeny Aryeh
2016	Exact Sciences	Mathematics: David Kazhdan, Joseph Bernstein
2016	Life Sciences	Brain Research: Haim Sompolinsky
2016	Social Sciences	Social Work: Zahava Solomon, Rami Benbenishty
2016	Humanities	Holocaust Research: Yehuda Bauer
2016	Culture and Arts	Hebrew Literature: Abraham B. Yehoshua, Ronit Matalon
2015	Exact Sciences	Earth Science: Joseph Loya; Environmental Science: Daniel Rosenfeld
2015	Life Sciences	Agriculture: Morris Soller, Dani Zamir
2015	Social Sciences	Education: Bat-Sheva Eylon, Miriam Ben-Peretz
2015	Humanities	Jewish Philosophy: Dov Schwartz
2015	Culture and Arts	Music: Betty Olivero, Tzvi Avni
2015	Special Honoree	Gabriel Bach
2014	Exact Sciences	Computer Science: Shimon Ullman
2014	Life Sciences	Biotechnology: David Wallach
2014	Social Sciences	Law: Yitzhak Zamir, Ariel Porat
2014	Humanities	Archaeology: Naama Goren-Inbar, Yoram Tsafrir
2014	Culture and Arts	Architecture: Shlomo Aronson, Yaacov Yaar
2014	Special Honoree	Michael Sela
2013	Exact Sciences	Physics: Moty Heiblum
2013	Life Sciences	Genetics: Ben-Zion Shilo, Giora Simchen, Gideon Rechavi
2013	Social Sciences	Political Science: Shlomo Avineri
2013	Humanities	Jewish Languages: David M. Bunis
2013	Culture and Arts	Painting: Zvi Goldstein; Sculpture: Nahum Tevet
2012	Exact Sciences	Chemistry: Raphael Mechoulam, Abraham Nitzan
2012	Life Sciences	Physiology: Adi Kimchi, Marshall Devor
2012	Social Sciences	Economics: Menahem Yaari
2012	Humanities	Linguistics: Ruth A. Berman, Moshe Bar-Asher
2012	Culture and Arts	Acting: Lea Koenig-Stolper
2011	Exact Sciences	Mathematics: Saharon Shelah, Noga Alon
2011	Social Sciences	Psychology: Dan Zakay, Gershon Ben-Shakhar
2011	Humanities	Jewish Law: Eliav Shochetman, Berachyahu Lifshitz
2011	Culture and Arts	Photography: Miki Kratsman, Hanan Laskin
2010	Exact Sciences	Computer Science: Sarit Kraus, David Harel
2010	Life Sciences	Brain Research: Moussa B.H. Youdim, Baruch Minke
2010	Social Sciences	Journalism: Carmela Menashe
2010	Humanities	Ancient Middle East Studies: Itamar Singer; African and Asian Studies: David Dean Shulman
2010	Culture and Arts	Poetry and Literature: Shin Shifra
2009	Exact Sciences	Physics: Harry J. Lipkin
2009	Life Sciences	Cancer Research: Chaim Cedar, Aharon Razin
2009	Humanities	Talmudic Studies: Menahem Kahana; Jewish Philosophy: Zev Harvey
2009	Culture and Arts	Choreography and Dance: Yair Vardi, Ohad Naharin
2008	Exact Sciences	Chemistry: Joshua Jortner, Itamar Willner
2008	Life Sciences	Genetics: Batsheva Kerem, Yoram Groner
2008	Social Sciences	Education: Moshe Dov Caspi, Rachel Elboim-Dror
2008	Humanities	Middle Eastern Studies: Etan Kohlberg, Sasson Somekh
2008	Culture and Arts	Music: Yizhak Sadai, Yoni Rechter
2007	Exact Sciences	Computer Science: Micha Sharir; Mathematics: Vitali Milman, Shmuel Agmon
2007	Life Sciences	Biochemistry: Yosef Yarden; Microbiology: Eliora Z. Ron
2007	Social Sciences	Law: Aharon Barak; Criminology: Shlomo Giora Shoham
2007	Humanities	Philosophy: Avishai Margalit; History: Myriam Yardeni
2007	Culture and Arts	Literature: Sami Michael, David Grossman
2006	Exact Sciences	Physics: Yakir Aharonov, Yoseph Imry; Earth Science: Zvi Garfunkel
2006	Life Sciences	Medicine: Peretz Lavie; Biology: Ada Yonath, Eli Keshet
2006	Social Sciences	Economics: Haim Levy; Management Science: Ariel Rubinstein
2006	Humanities	Talmudic Studies: Yaakov Sussmann; Jewish Philosophy: Yehuda Liebes
2006	Culture and Arts	Design: Zvi Narkis; Architecture: Nitza Metzger Szmuk
2005	Exact Sciences	Chemistry: Meir Wilchek; Chemical Engineering: Zehev Tadmor
2005	Life Sciences	Cancer Research: Yosef Shiloh; Biology: Zvi Selinger
2005	Social Sciences	Archaeology: Amos Kloner, Ephraim Stern; Sociology: S.N. Eisenstadt
2005	Humanities	Religion: R.J. Zwi Werblowsky; Literary Research: Benjamin Harshav
2005	Culture and Arts	Theater Director: Michael Gurevitch; Acting: Orna Porat
2004	Exact Sciences	Computer Science: Michael O. Rabin; Mathematics: Hillel Furstenberg
2004	Life Sciences	Biotechnology: Michel Revel; Brain Research: Moshe Abeles
2004	Social Sciences	Psychology: Mario Mikulincer; Education: Zvi Lamm, Haim Harari
2004	Humanities	History: Meir Benayahu; Biblical Research: Emanuel Tov
2004	Culture and Arts	Painting: Yair Garbuz; Sculpture: Ya'acov Dorchin
2003	Exact Sciences	Physics: Igal Talmi, Yuval Ne'eman
2003	Life Sciences	Biology: Varda Rotter, Moshe Oren; Agriculture: Ilan Chet
2003	Social Sciences	Law: Ruth Gavison
2003	Humanities	History: Michael Confino, Moshe Jammer
2003	Culture and Arts	Dance: Rina Schenfeld; Music: Noam Sheriff
2002	Exact Sciences	Chemistry: Dan Shechtman, Raphael Levine
2002	Life Sciences	Medicine: Avram Hershko, Aaron Ciechanover; Genetics: Leo Sachs
2002	Social Sciences	Economics: Elhanan Helpman, Israel Aumann
2002	Humanities	Talmudic Studies: Israel Ta-Shma; Jewish Philosophy: Moshe Idel
2002	Culture and Arts	Literature: S. Yizhar
