= Yair Reisner =

Israeli immunologist

- Born: 1948 (age 77–78)
- Education: BSc, Chemistry, 1972, Hebrew University of Jerusalem; MSc, Biochemistry, 1974, University of California, Berkeley; PhD, Chemistry, 1978, Weizmann Institute of Science
- Awards: EMET Prize (2019)
- Scientific career
- Workplaces: Weizmann Institute of Science; MD Anderson Cancer Center

Yair Y. Reisner is an Israeli immunologist. He is a professor in the Department of Immunology at the Weizmann Institute of Science. Reisner received the 2019 EMET Prize in Life Sciences Bio-Medicine Award for "developing strategies for overcoming immune barriers in bone marrow transplantation for the treatment of leukemia and other cancers."

== Education ==
Reisner was born in 1948. He earned his Bachelor of Science degree at the Hebrew University of Jerusalem and his Master of Science degree in Biochemistry from the University of California, Berkeley. He then returned to Israel for his PhD in Biophysics at the Weizmann Institute of Science. Reisner then moved to New York City to complete his post-doctoral fellowship at the Memorial Sloan Kettering Cancer Center from 1978 to 1981.

== Career ==
Reisner returned to the Weizmann Institute following his post-doctoral fellowship and became the Dr. Phil Gold Career Development Chair in Cancer Research in 1983. During his tenure at the Weizmann Institute, Reisner focused on improving regenerative medicine by using Embryonic stem tissues as a novel source for organ transplantation. In the early 1980s, Reisner developed a novel method for transplanting stem cells from family members who were only a partial match. He then collaborated with colleagues at Memorial Sloan Kettering Cancer Center to use this method to treat children suffering from severe combined immune deficiency (SCID). In 1994, Reisner designed a method to safely give leukemia patients bone marrow and stem cells from relatives who were not perfect matches. He subsequently received the 1996 Mortimer M. Borton Award for Outstanding Research in Blood and Marrow Transplantation. In 2002, Reisner's research team grew fully functional kidneys in mice using human stem cells. He subsequently received the 2003 Inventor of the Year Award and was recognized by the World Technology Network as "one of top five people in the field of Health and Medicine whose work is of the greatest likely long-term significance."

Reisner received the 2019 EMET Prize in Life Sciences Bio-Medicine Award for "developing strategies for overcoming immune barriers in bone marrow transplantation for the treatment of leukemia and other cancers." The following year, he was elected a Member of the Israel Academy of Sciences and Humanities.

=== Chernobyl disaster ===
Six days following the 1986 Chernobyl disaster, Reisner was contacted by Robert Peter Gale to help treat the Chernobyl victims. Due to the Soviet Union's role in the Arab–Israeli conflict, Reisner was concerned about his presence in the country without a visa. As he would be the first Israeli citizen in nearly 20 years to enter the Soviet Union, Reisner contacted the Israeli Embassy before his trip and was assured that medical personnel would meet him at the airport. Reisner landed in the Soviet Union 11 days following the disaster and was immediately handed a visa by Soviet officials, despite his Israeli citizenship. He was then taken to Hospital No. 6 where he set up a laboratory within 24 hours. Reisner then spent 10 days in the Soviet Union working in his laboratory with the supplies he had brought, performing bone marrow transplants, and helping other patients. Reisner also taught Soviet doctors his bone marrow techniques including how to prevent the rejection of bone marrow. Although the Soviet doctors all had copies of his published work, they lacked the resources and equipment to perform such techniques in their hospitals.

After Chernobyl, Reisner returned to the Weizmann Institute. During Margaret Thatcher's visit to Israel, she expressed her appreciation of Reisner for alerting Western countries to the kind of medical preparations needed to deal with possible similar catastrophies in the future.
