= David Wallach =

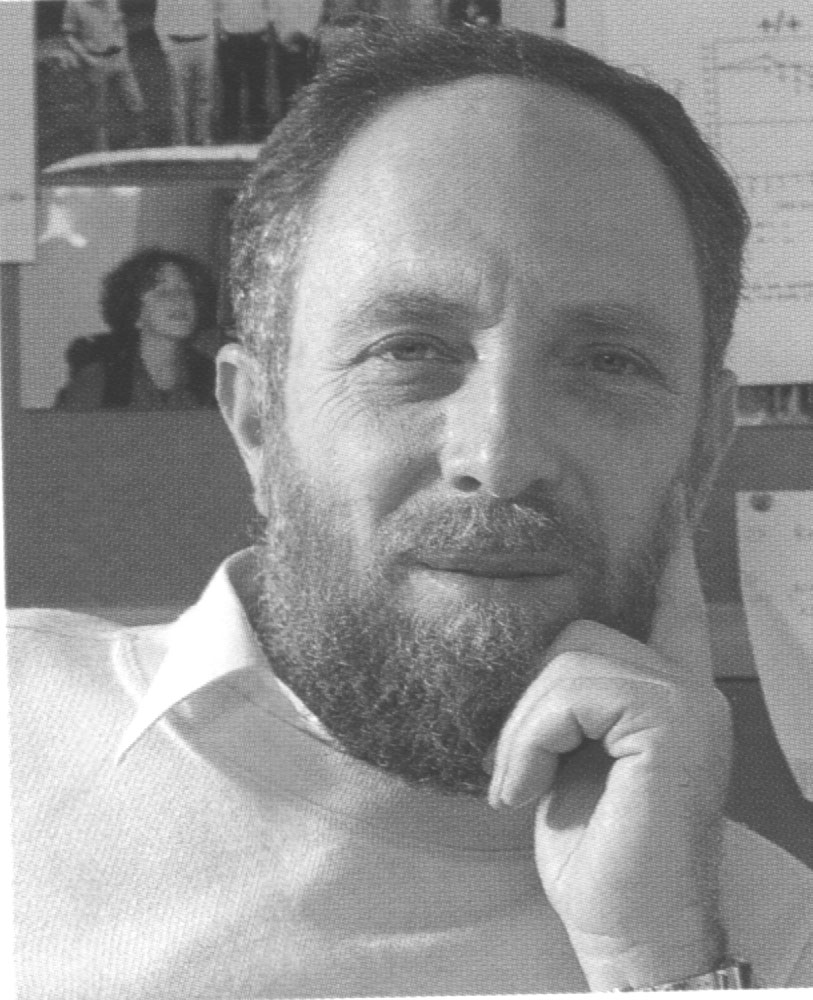
David Wallach

David Wallach (Hebrew: דוד ולך; born January 23, 1946) is a full professor at the Department of Biomolecular Sciences at the Weizmann Institute of Science, Israel, laureate of the 2014 Emet Prize for Life Sciences. , and laureate of the 2018 The Paul Ehrlich and Ludwig Darmstaedter Prize.

== Biography ==
David Wallach was born in Kiryat Bialik, where he lived until the age of 18, before moving to Jerusalem. His parents, Tzvi Wallach and Ziva (née Ludmer), immigrated from Bukovina and Galicia (Eastern Europe)) shortly before World War II. David has a brother and a sister. His sister, Sarah Stroumsa, is a full professor of Jewish Thought at the Hebrew University of Jerusalem, and formerly the university’s rector.

David Wallach’s academic studies, from B.Sc. to Ph.D., were conducted in the Department of Biological Chemistry at the Hebrew University. He did his master’s studies under the supervision of Professor Itzhak Ohad and his doctoral studies under the supervision of Professor Michael Schramm. In these studies, he explored the mechanisms of cell-membrane generation, and of protein packing in glandular secretory granules. His postdoctoral research was carried out on signaling mechanisms at the National Institutes of Health at Bethesda, Maryland under the supervision of Professor Ira Pastan. In 1977, Wallach returned to Israel and joined the Weizmann Institute of Science in Rehovot. He became an associate professor in 1983 and a full professor in 1995.

In 2011/2012, he served as president of the International Cytokine Society.

Wallach currently serves as chairman of the Jewish Galicia and Bukovina organization.

He is married to Naomi (née Rosenberg), a writer and painter, and they have two children, including the poet Rachel Wallach.

== Academic career ==
Since 1977, Wallach has been studying the functions of cytokines and their signaling mechanisms, focusing on a cytokine group known as the ‘TNF (Tumor Necrosis Factor) family’, as well as on cell-death mechanisms. Wallach’s lab was of the first to demonstrate that TNF can affect a variety of cellular activities including some that contradict each other, such as the induction of cell death and the induction of resistance to cell death.

Wallach was among the first to isolate TNF and its receptors. He deciphered the extrinsic cell-death pathway, as well as some of the mechanisms of activation of transcription factors of the NF-κB family. Among the molecules first cloned at his lab are the protease caspase-8, the adaptor protein FADD (MORT1), the cell-death inhibitory protein cFlip, the protein kinase NIK, and the adaptor protein NEMO (IKK-γ). Wallach’s work has contributed to the discovery of the ‘death domain’ protein motif, and provided the first evidence that proteases can serve as intracellular signaling molecules.

These discoveries aided the development of TNF-inhibiting medications, including Etanercept (Enbrel) and adalimumab (Humira) that are widely used to treat chronic inflammatory diseases such as rheumatoid arthritis, psoriasis, and the inflammatory bowel diseases Crohn’s disease and ulcerative colitis.

== Awards and recognition ==
- 1997 – Teva Founders Prize in the field of Cell Signal Transduction
- 2012 – Merck Serono Prize
- 2012 – Rappaport Prize in Biomedical Sciences in the Established Investigator category
- 2014 – Emet Prize, Life Sciences category in the field of Biotechnology
- 2018 – Paul Ehrlich and Ludwig Darmstaedter Prize
