= Moshe Abeles =

Brain researcher

- משה אבלס
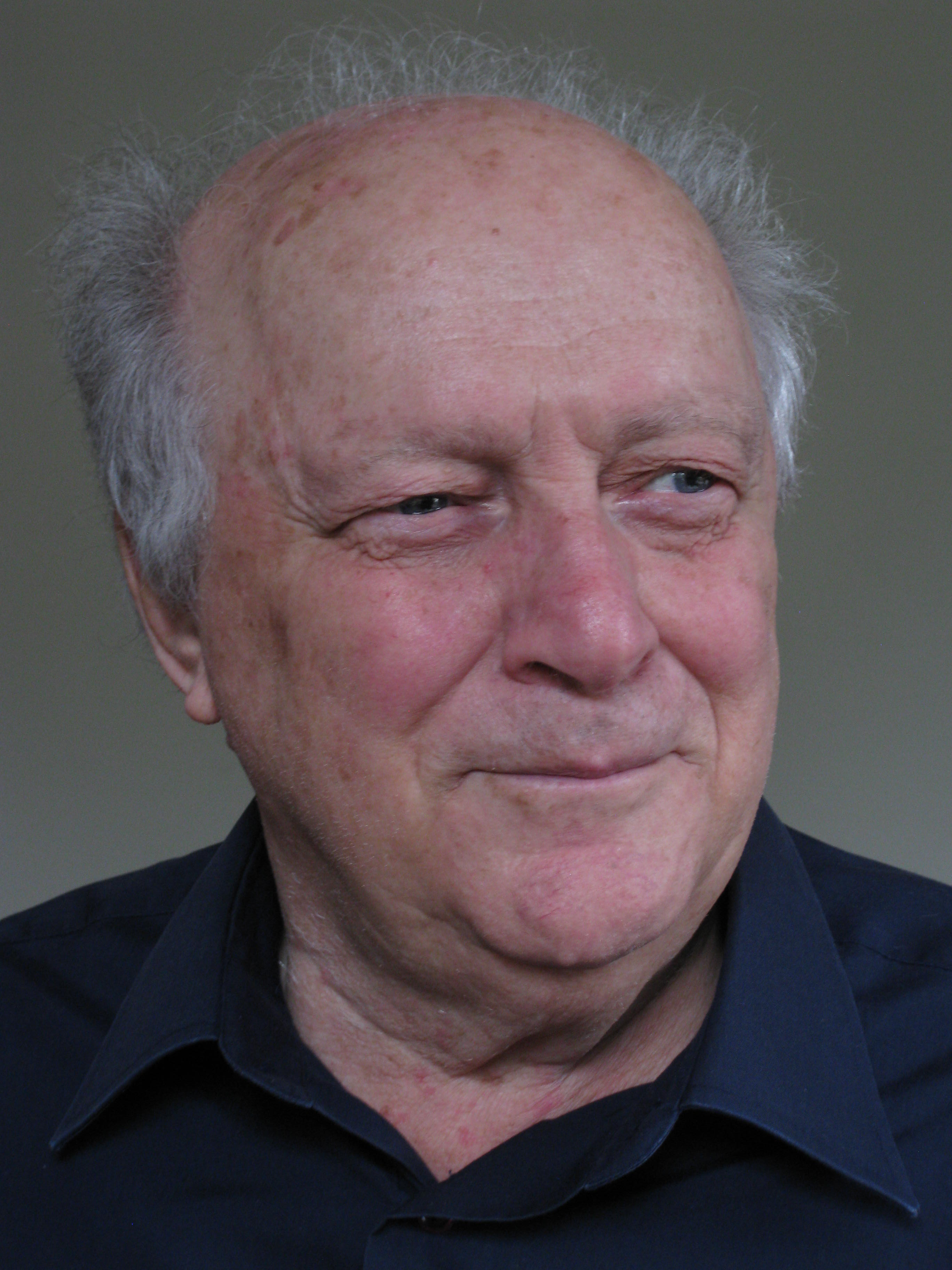
- Born: 1936 (age 89–90); Tel Aviv, Mandatory Palestine
- Education: Hebrew University of Jerusalem
- Known for: Synfire chain theory
- Scientific career
- Fields: Brain research, Neurophysiology
- Institutions: Hebrew University of Jerusalem, Bar Ilan University

Moshe Abeles (Hebrew: משה אבלס; born 1936 in Tel Aviv) is an Israeli brain researcher and neurophysiologist. He is emeritus professor at the Hebrew University in Jerusalem and at the Life Science Faculty of Bar Ilan University in Ramat Gan.

== Biography ==
Moshe Abeles is born in 1936 in Tel Aviv, then Mandatory Palestine. His father, Dr. Walter Abeles (1903–1985), was a physician, political activist and diplomat, who led the Jerusalem District direction of Clalit Health Services and in the 1960s was Israel's ambassador to Colombia and then to Costa Rica and Nicaragua. The mother, Cecilia born Nehamkis, was clothing designer and voluntary teacher of sewing at schools for poverty-stricken girls in Jerusalem În 1947 Abeles moved with his family to Jerusalem and learned at the Hebrew University Secondary School. then Abeles served in the Nahal paratroopers and in 1956 began medicine studies at the Hebrew University in Jerusalem. In the first years of his studies there Abeles distinguished himself in mathematics, physics and chemistry and became interested in physiology. After four years of medicine studies he devoted himself to research.

In 1960 he received his M.Sc. for a work on the influence of respiration on EEG waves under the direction of Professor Yonathan Magnes, who also supervised in 1966 his doctoral dissertation on Mechanisms of EEG Synchronization and De-synchronization.

In 1977-1980 and again in 1984-1994 Moshe Abeles was the director of the Israeli National Institute of Neurobiology. He specialized in Biomedical Engineering at Johns Hopkins University, then became lecturer, senior lecturer, associate professor and full professor of neurophysiology at the Hebrew University in Jerusalem. Prof. Abeles served also as Director of the Department of Physiology at the Hebrew University, as Head of the Interdisciplinary Center for Neural Computation, as Head of the Life Sciences Section of the Israel Science Foundation, and Director of the Gonda Brain Research Center at Bar Ilan University.

Abeles research focuses on the functional circuits in the cerebral cortex. His physiological findings and his models about the functional significance of temporal relations in the cortex led to the "synfire chain theory" about how information processing can be carried out through the coordinated dynamic activity of cell assemblies.

In 2005 Abeles has founded the Gonda Multidisciplinary Brain Research Center at Bar-Ilan University, and directed it until 2011.

Abeles is the author of several highly cited books in neuroscience, including Corticonics: Neural circuits of the cerebral cortex (1991) and Local Cortical Circuits: An Electrophysiological Study (2012).

== Researches, articles, books ==
- Local Cortical Circuits: An Electrophysiological Study, Springer-Verlag, 1982.
- Corticonics: Neural Circuits of the Cerebral Cortex, Cambridge University Press, 1991.
- with H. Bergman, E. Margalit and E. Vaadia,"Spatiotemporal Firing Patterns in the Frontal Cortex of Behaving Monkeys", J. Neurophysiol. Vol. 70, No. 4., 1993.
- with Y. Prut, H. Bergman, E. Vaadia and A. Aertsen, "Integration, Synchronicity and Periodicity", in A. Aertsen (ed.), Brain Theory: Spatio-temporal Aspects of Brain Function, Elsvier, Amsterdam, pp 149–181, 1993.

== Prizes and awards ==
- 1968 - Avigdor Beck Prize for 3 Papers on excitability of EEG synchronizing and desynchronizing neurons
- 1971 - IAPI First Prize for work on computer aided analysis of nerve cell activity
- 2004: Emet Prize
- 2012: the first Valentino Braitenberg award.
