= Carmela Menashe =

Israeli journalist (born 1949)

- כרמלה מנשה
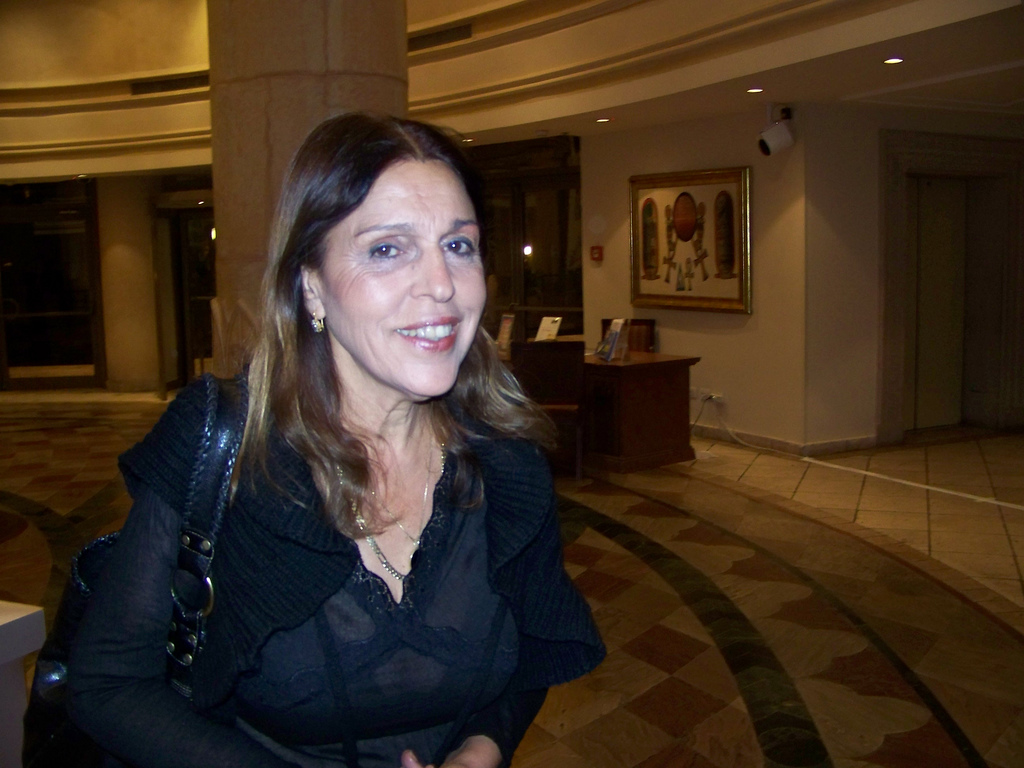
- Carmela Menashe in 2008
- Born: October 1, 1949 (age 76); Givataim, Israel

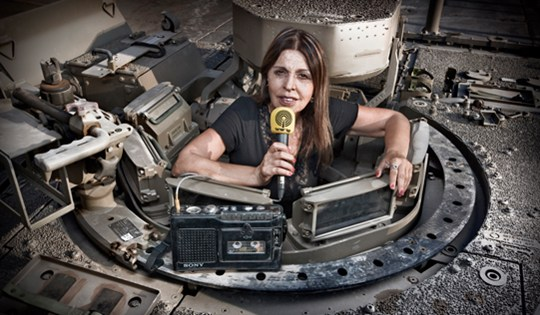
Carmela Menashe in 2010 after winning the EMET Prize

Carmela Menashe (Hebrew: כרמלה מנשה; born 1949) is an Israeli journalist serving as a military reporter on IDF issues, on Israel's public radio Kol Yisrael.

== Biography ==
Carmela Menashe is the daughter of Iraqi Jewish immigrants. She holds a master's degree in History of the Jewish People from Tel Aviv University. She served in the IDF Paratroopers Brigade. She has one daughter, Ella, whom she raised as a single mother. Besides her journalism career, she is known as a champion of IDF soldiers and their families, aiding those who have been harassed or neglected within the IDF.

== Journalism career ==
In 1974, Menashe started working at Kol Yisrael as a secretary. After graduating from a correspondents course, she was appointed the editor of the "Tzivei Keshset" radio program. Since 1994 she has also served as the director of military reporters at Kol Yisrael.

Menashe was the first female Israeli broadcaster to become a military correspondent.

== Awards and recognition ==
- Sokolov Award for her exposés and activities (1998)
- Bnot Brit award for outstanding contribution to society security
- Israel Broadcasting Authority's Ilan Roe Award presented by the CEO
- Movement for Quality Government in Israel award.
- Ometz - citizens for proper government and social and judicial justice award (2008)
- The EMET Prize for Art, Science and Culture, Category in the Social Sciences, field of Journalism (2010)
- In 2014, Menashe was chosen to light at torch at the Israel Independence Day ceremony on Mount Herzl.

== See also ==
- Women of Israel
