= Michael Confino =

Israeli historian (1926–2010)

- מייקל קונפינו
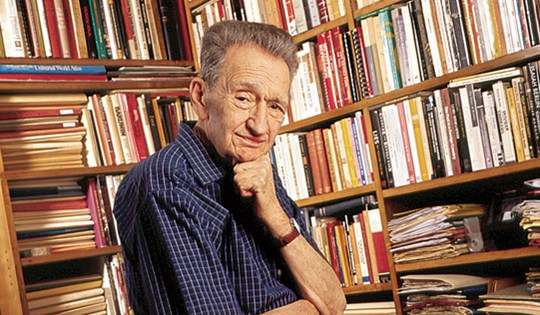
- Born: 2 April 1926; Sofia, Kingdom of Bulgaria
- Died: 16 June 2010 (aged 84); Herzliya, Israel
- Occupation: Historian

Michael (Michel) Confino (Hebrew: מייקל קונפינו; 1926–2010) was a historian of 18th and 19th century Russia.

== Biography ==
Confino was born in Sofia, Kingdom of Bulgaria. He began his academic studies at the University of Sofia. He moved to Israel in 1948 and continued his studies at the Hebrew University of Jerusalem and at École pratique des hautes études in Paris. Confino earned his PhD at the Sorbonne.

In 1959 he joined the teaching staff of the Hebrew University of Jerusalem, where he formed and headed the Russian Studies Department. In 1970 Confino joined Tel Aviv University, and in 1971 he founded the Institute of Russian and Eastern Europe studies, which he headed until 1977. Between 1980 and 1985 Confino served as a visiting professor at the universities of Stanford, Harvard, Duke, Chicago and some institutions in Europe.

Confino specialized in researching the history of Russia and the problems of Europe's agricultural comparative framework of the social structure, under different regimes, both past and present. He was a member of the Israel Academy of Sciences and Humanities. In 1993 Confino was awarded the Israel Prize in History, and in 2003 The EMET Prize for Art, Science and Culture.

One of his children is the historian Alon Confino.

== Publications ==
- On Intellectuals and Intellectual Traditions in Eighteenth- and Nineteenth-Century Russia (Spring, 1972)
