= Dorit Ravid =

Linguist

Dorit Diskin Ravid (Hebrew: דורית רביד; born 1952) is a professor of linguistics at Tel Aviv University, specializing in psycholinguistics with a focus on language acquisition.

== Education, career and honours ==
Ravid’s early studies were carried out under the mentorship of Ruth A. Berman. She has spent her whole career post-PhD at Tel Aviv University. Hired initially as a lecturer in 1994, she was promoted to senior lecturer (with tenure) in 1998, associate professor in 2003, and full professor in 2007.

In 2011 she was elected as a member of the Academia Europaea. Before this, in 2005, she was awarded an International Francqui Chair at the University of Antwerp, Belgium. She has also served as Chair of the Israel Organization for Language and Literacy between 2005 and 2009. In 2022 she was the recipient of a festschrift, Developing Language and Literacy: Studies in Honor of Dorit Diskin Ravid.

== Research ==
Ravid’s research has focused on language acquisition, both in children and adolescents, touching also on the fields of language change and sociolinguistics. Her research is carried out within a usage-based framework. Her 1995 book Language Change in Child and Adult Hebrew investigated variation and change in ten different groups of Modern Hebrew speakers, taking into account age, level of education, and socio-economic status, leading her to propose that the development of literacy goes hand in hand with cognitive maturation; the book has been described as pathbreaking.

== Selected publications ==
- Ravid, Dorit D. 1995. Language change in child and adult Hebrew: A psycholinguistic perspective. Oxford: Oxford University Press. ISBN 9780195090369
- Ravid, Dorit D., and Liliana Tolchinsky. 2002. Developing linguistic literacy: A comprehensive model. Journal of Child Language 29(2), 417-447. doi:10.1017/S0305000902005111
- Berman, Ruth A., and Dorit D. Ravid. 2009. Becoming a literate language user: oral and written text construction across adolescence. In David R. Olson and Nancy Torrance (eds.), The Cambridge handbook of literacy, 92–110. Cambridge: Cambridge University Press.
- DeKeyser, Robert, Iris Alfi-Shabtay and Dorit D. Ravid. 2010. Cross-linguistic evidence for the nature of age effects in second language acquisition. Applied Psycholinguistics 31(3), 413-438. doi:10.1017/S0142716410000056
- Ravid, Dorit D. 2011. Spelling morphology: the psycholinguistics of Hebrew spelling. New York: Springer. ISBN 9781441905888
