= Eve V. Clark =

British-born American linguist (born 1942)

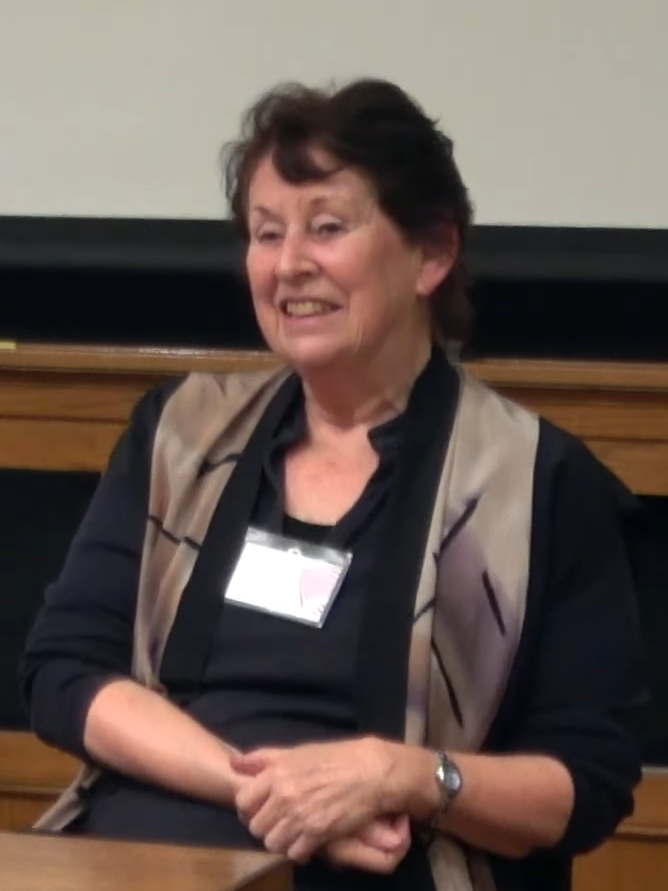
- Clark in 2019
- Born: July 26, 1942 (age 83)
- Education: University of Edinburgh (PhD)
- Occupations: Linguist; professor
- Spouse: Herbert H. Clark

Eve Vivienne Clark (born 26 July 1942) is a British-born American linguist. Clark's research focuses on first language acquisition, especially the acquisition of meaning. She has also worked on the acquisition and use of word-formation, including comparative studies of English and Hebrew in children and adults. Some of her research examines what children can learn about conventional ways to say things based on adult responses to child errors during acquisition.

== Academic career ==
Clark earned her PhD in Linguistics in 1969, studying with John Lyons at the University of Edinburgh. She worked on the Language Universals Project at Stanford with Joseph Greenberg, and subsequently joined the Linguistics Department at Stanford University. She is the Richard Lyman Professor emerita in the Humanities at Stanford.

== Awards and honors ==
- Fellow at the Center for Advanced Study in the Behavioral Sciences at Stanford (1979)
- Guggenheim Fellowship (1983).
- Elected Foreign Member of the Royal Netherlands Academy of Arts and Sciences/Koninklijke Nederlandse Akademie van Wetenschappen (KNAW) in 1991.
- Invited speaker in the Linguistic Society of America's inaugural Public Lectures on Language series (2017).
- Elected Fellow of the American Association for the Advancement of Science (2003)
- Elected Fellow of the Association for Psychological Science (APS) (2007)
- Fellow of the Cognitive Science Society
- Roger Brown Award from the International Association for the Study of Child Language (IASCL) (2020/2021)

== Research ==
Clark's work was focused heavily on first-language acquisition, the acquisition of meaning, word formation across children and language, and the varying issues in lexicon and language use. She has done extensive observational and experimental research. Some of her most remarkable studies come from the interaction of children with adults, where she demonstrates how vital these interactions are for further development of language for young children. She has also studied the pragmatics of coining words.

=== Young children's uptake of new words in conversation ===
Clark aimed to understand how children register words they haven't heard before by extracting the words and transcripts from five corpora (collection of written/spoken texts) (2007). She hypothesized that, because the repetition of a new word is how children place that word into their language, there will be a difference in repeat-rates for new information and given information. To test the prediction, she compared children's repetitions of the new words to the repetition in the new-to given conversation shifts. The study consisted of 701 new words that were used and exposed to the five children. An example of the way the words were said to the children is as follows:

"Deictic term (this/that/here) + new word

(This) is an + owl

(Here) is a + whisk"

(Clark & Wong, 2002)

The five corpora, or collections of written/spoken speech, were analyzed by three researchers who each observed specific children: Stanley Kuczaj (child: Abe), Jacqueline Sachs (child: Naomi) and Roger Brown (children: Adam, Eve and Sarah). Each child was recorded at different intervals, ranging from twice a week to every other week. To analyze whether the children were registering the new words, it was coded every time a child repeated the new word, acknowledged or moved on. Although the children all differed on who initiated the conversation first, her results found that 54% of the time, children repeated the word in their next turn, 38% of the time the child had utterances (move-ons) which were relevant to the new word and topic, and 9% of the time the children said 'yeah' (acknowledgement).

Even though the children's acknowledgments were very small in terms of measurement, it displays that the children are capable of understanding and acceptance of the new words, a step forward in grounding the new terms that the adults offered. Children who moved on from the new word continued the conversation in the same semantic field, meaning that although the grasping of the new word may not be verbally recognized, the meaning behind the continued conversation displays a possible grasp on integrating the context into their understanding.

From this study, Clark's results displayed that children repeated the new words about twice as much as they repeated utterance information from ordinary conversations. Her hypothesis was supported in that there is a difference in the function of repetition between new words and new information. Children are aware of new words, and rely on the introduction of them using the deictic frame. Clark wanted to continue this phenomenon of children and how they integrate these new words into their vocabulary, so she began to use words that young children surround themselves with everyday, but do not quite get exposed to in language, and that is color.

=== Color, reference, and expertise in language acquisition ===
Eve Clark furthered her research on children's understanding of new words, while focusing specifically on the knowledge and identification of colors. She discovered that children find difficulty in learning and understanding the label for each color, so her research led her to study tips to help children. Clark emphasized joint attention as a key piece of acquiring the terms for colors. When the child and the adult share the attention together, the child is able to learn colors, and furthermore, the complex shades and hues of that color. Along with joint attention, Clark found that in order for a child to learn the terms for colors, the child and adult must interact with conversation. Without direct attention, the child will struggle to grasp concepts on their own because there is nobody to tell them what is right or wrong.

Furthering her explanation, Clark tells that a child must first learn the hue. Only after the child has grasped that concept can they start to learn the tints and shades. This concept specifically grows from the interaction with an adult. The child's understanding of the tints or shade of a hue increases when presented by older individuals around them.

Eve Clark's research continues as she explores not only how children acquire the understanding and meaning of words, but how they can use those words in context.

=== Conventionality and contrast in language acquisition ===
Clark looks at how conventionality and contrast both add to language. Convention is defined as a norm, a standard everyone must follow to ensure proper communication. This rule is followed in terms of language as well as general knowledge. Everyone uses the same word to relay the same meaning, and mostly in the same way. When hearing a language for the first time, a child must figure out the meaning of the word in relation to the words around it. The contrasting words give hints to what the unknown word represents. With more context and exposure, children are able to make the connection and learn their first language. If a child and parent are at a zoo learning animals, learning the difference between two striped animals is where conventionality and contrast come in (tiger vs. zebra). While this rule can differentiate between nouns, this also applies when children figure out which tense of a verb to use (e.g. telled [sic] vs. told).

Conventionality and contrast are essential factors that help build on one's language acquisition; however, Clark expands on how language acquisition can build on cognitive development as well.

=== How language acquisition builds on cognitive development ===
Clark's accomplishments and reputation in linguistics is shown in her ability relate language acquisition to cognition. She details that cognition and language are co-extensive and children first build on what they know before language, and then use language as well in constructing additional categories. Clark's concepts on cognition in relation to language acquisition reinforce that cognition and language interact in a cyclical fashion as children learn more. Clark expresses that words might be regarded as invitations to form categories and to individuate object kinds. Also, Clark believes that language might enable analogies that allow for greater complexity of thought. When discovering language, Clark says that children learn most from their adult figures in their life and how infants pick up on the most frequent nouns, verbs, and adjectives first before extending their range. This suggests that we as children, and as people in general, use representations based not only on representations linked to specific languages, but also on their cognitive development, for categorization, identification, sorting and remembering.

== Publications ==
Clark H. H. and E. V. Clark (1977). Psychology and Language.

Clark E. V. (1979). Ontogenesis of Meaning.

Clark, E. V. and H. H. Clark (1979). "When nouns surface as verbs," Language 55: 767–811.

Clark E. V. and R. A. Berman (1984). "Structure and use in the acquisition of word formation," Language 60, 542-590.

Clark E. V. (1985). Acquisition of Romance, with special reference to French.

Clark E. V. (1993). The Lexicon in Acquisition.

Clark E. V. (2003). First Language Acquisition.

Clark, E. V. (2004). How language acquisition builds on cognitive development. Trends in Cognitive Sciences, 8(10), 472-478.

Clark E. V. (2006). Color, reference, and expertise in language acquisition. Journal of Experimental Child Psychology 94(4), 339-343.

Clark E. V. (2007). Conventionality and contrast in language and language acquisition. New Directions for Child & Adolescent Development, 2007(115), 11–23.

Clark E. V. (2007). Young children's uptake of new words in conversation. Language in Society 36(2), 157-182
