= Yaacov Yaar =

Israeli architect (born 1929)

- יעקב יער
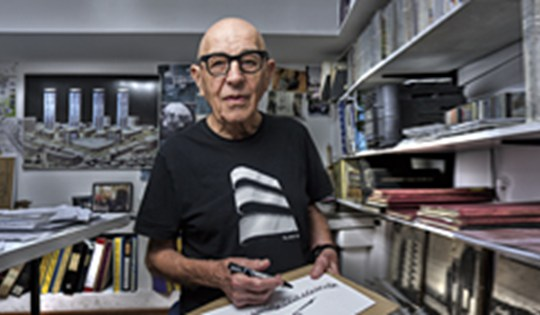
- Yaar in 2006
- Born: 1929 (age 96–97); Germany
- Occupation: Architect
- Known for: Public and social architecture; Restoration of historical sites
- Awards: Israel Prize in Architecture (2007); EMET Prize in Architecture (2014); Rokach Prize; Uzzi Rosen Prize; Kaplan Prize

Yaacov Yaar (Hebrew: יעקב יער; born 1929) is an Israeli architect, who received the Israel Prize for architecture in 2006, and the EMET Prize in 2014.

== Biography ==
Yaar was born in Germany in 1929 and immigrated to Palestine with his family in 1935. He attended the Ohel Shem School in Ramat Gan, and the Gymnasia Herzlia in Tel Aviv. After completing high school he served in the Jewish Settlement Police and in the Israeli Defense Forces. Upon his release from military service in the fall of 1949, he studied architecture at the Haifa Technion, graduating cum laude in 1953, followed later by a diploma in Engineering (Arch).

During his studies, he met his wife Ora Gerstenfeld, whom he married in 1954. The couple had two sons and a daughter. Gerstenfeld died in 1999 and today he lives with his spouse - Ruth A. Berman.

== Career ==
Yaar worked as an architect for five years in the offices of Sharon-Idelson in Tel Aviv.

In 1960 Yaar established his own architectural practice together with his wife, Ora Gerstenfeld. From the start of their careers, the couple worked primarily in planning public and social projects, including neighborhoods for new immigrants, young couples and evacuees from distressed areas. From 2000 onward Yaar worked with Aviv Yaar and Talli Yaar-Kost.

== Awards ==
In 2007, Yaar received the Israel Prize for Architecture. Other awards include the Rokach Prize, first for his role in the renewal of the Old City of Jaffa and subsequently for the planning of the Kfir neighborhood, the Uzzi Rosen Prize of the Jerusalem Architects’ Association for his work on restoration of the Old City of Jerusalem and the Kaplan Prize for design, development, and construction of Pisgat Ze’ev in Jerusalem. In 2014 Yaar received the EMET prize in the field of architecture.

== Public activity ==
Yaar served as President of the Association of Israel Architects. He taught for many years at the Faculty of Architecture of the Technion and, subsequently, the School of Architecture at Tel Aviv University.

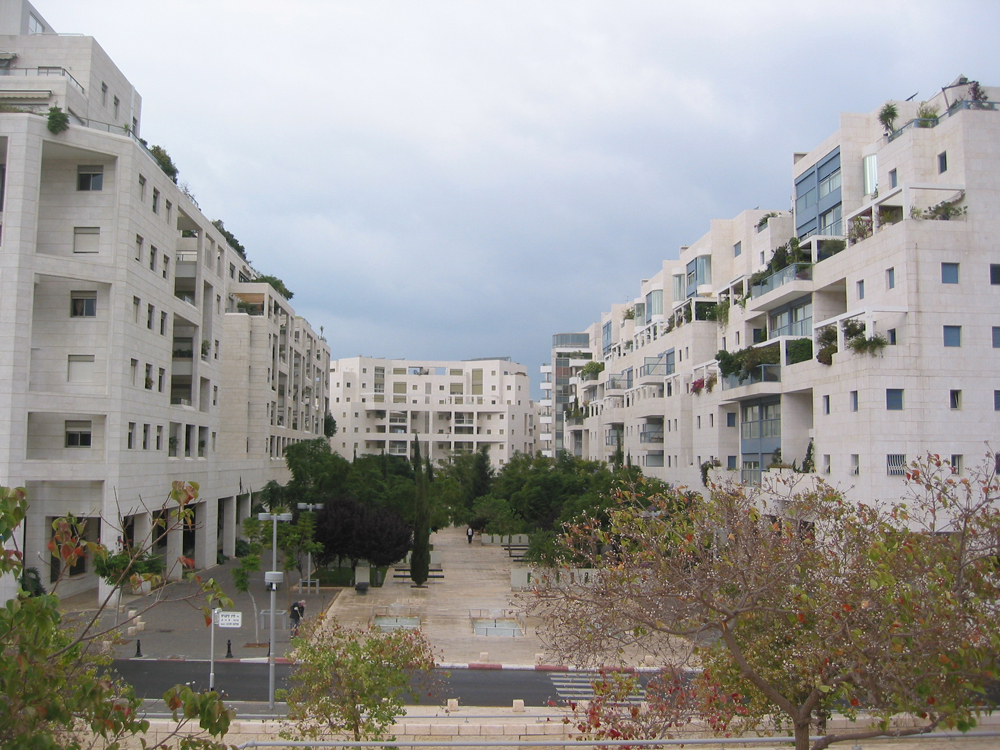
The central promenade in the Mashtela neighborhood

- Giv’at Ha-Moreh in Afula, Neve Rassco in Ramat Ha-Sharon.
- Eli Cohen neighborhood in Kfar Sava during the 1960s.
- Kfir neighborhood in Tel Aviv, In the 1970s, winning the Rokach Prize along with landscape architect Hillel Omer (the poet Ayin Hillel).
- Pisgat Ze’ev in Jerusalem, 1980's.
- Ramat Shlomo in Jerusalem, 1980's.
- HaMashtela in Tel Aviv, 1980's.
- Preservation plan in Jaffa old city and port.
- Kikar HaShuk on the site of the former Tel Aviv wholesale market, in the 2000s.
- Neighbourhoods in: Kiryat Shmona, Rosh HaAyin, Modi’in, Netivot, Kiryat Gat.
