= Synfire chain =

Organic neural network

A synfire chain (synchronous firing chain) is a feed-forward network of neurons with multiple layers or pools. In a synfire chain, neural impulses propagate synchronously from layer to layer to transmit information. Each neuron in one layer feeds excitatory connections to neurons in the next, while each neuron in the receiving layer is excited by neurons in the previous layer.

== History ==
The term synfire chain was first used by Moshe Abeles in 1982, to account for the appearance of synchronous firing sequences with long inter-spike delays, which resisted explanation in terms of the known properties of cortical physiology. This structure, with every neuron in one pool exciting all neurons in the second pool, was suggested by Griffith as a structure that can guarantee a fixed level of activity in a network of excitatory neurons. He called this structure a “complete transmission line”. Griffith did not study its properties in any detail. A fairly similar idea in which synchronized reverberations among neuronal populations transfer information was suggested by Hebb in 1949. Modelling studies have shown that synfire chains develop spontaneously in self-organizing recurrent neural networks. Detecting synfire chains in the brain requires simultaneous recordings from more than 100 neurons, which is well in reach of modern in vivo electrophysiology.

== Activity ==
Activity along a synfire chain propagates in a synchronous or an asynchronous mode. In the asynchronous mode, an elevated firing rate in one pool will accumulate, and increase the firing rate in the next layer. In the synchronous mode, a volley of spikes in one layer will elicit a synchronous volley in the other, after one synaptic delay. It has been argued that the only stable mode of transmission is the synchronous mode.

== See also ==
- Neuronal ensemble
- Sharp-wave ripple
- Neuropixels
