= Eli Keshet =

Professor of Molecular Biology from Israel

- אלי קשת
- Education: Hebrew University of Jerusalem
- Awards: EMET Prize (2006); Israel Prize (2021)
- Scientific career
- Workplaces: The Hebrew University; University of Wisconsin
- Academic advisors: Prof. Nathan De-Groot

Eli Keshet (Hebrew: אלי קשת) is an Israeli biochemist and professor of molecular biology at the Hebrew University of Jerusalem. He is the laureate of the 2021 Israel Prize for Life Sciences.

== Biography ==
Keshet completed his B.Sc., M.Sc. and Ph.D. at the Hebrew University of Jerusalem. His post-doctoral work included studies in the laboratory of Howard Temin at the University of Wisconsin (1976–79). In 1982 he began teaching at the Hebrew University, becoming an associate professor in 1986 and a full professor in 1993. In 2006 he won the EMET Prize, in 2014 the Rothchild award and 2015 the NAVBO Benditt Meritorious Award.

== Research ==
His main research area deals with the question of how new blood vessels are created when there is a shortage of oxygen. This process has far-reaching implications for the development of diseases concerning the eye's retina, as well as cancer. Keshet's findings also brought the realization that the excess oxygen given to babies who were born prematurely may cause them blindness, and has brought about a change in the way they are treated.

Keshet published more than 130 papers in journals which have been cited over 34,000 times.

== Selected papers ==
- D Shweiki, A Itin, D Soffer, E Keshet, Vascular endothelial growth factor induced by hypoxia may mediate hypoxia-initiated angiogenesis, Nature 359, 10, 1992, pp. 843–845
- Tamar Alon, Itzhak Hemo, Ahuva Itin, Jacob Pe'er, Jonathan Stone, Eli Keshet, Vascular endothelial growth factor acts as a survival factor for newly formed retinal vessels and has implications for retinopathy of prematurity, Nature medicine, 1, 10, 1995, pp. 1024–1028
- Laura E Benjamin, Eli Keshet, Conditional switching of vascular endothelial growth factor (VEGF) expression in tumors: induction of endothelial cell shedding and regression of hemangioblastoma-like vessels, Proceedings of the National Academy of Sciences, 94, 8, 1997, pp. 8761–8766

== Awards ==
- 2021: Israel Prize for life sciences
- 2015: NAVBO Benditt Meritorious Award for an American's life-work in the study of blood vessels diseases
- 2015: Teva Founders Award
- 2014: Rothschild Award
- 2006: EMET Award
