= Reshef Tenne =

Israeli scientist (born 1944)

- רשף טנא
- Born: September 2, 1944 (age 82); Usha, Eretz Israel
- Education: Hebrew University of Jerusalem (B.Sc., 1969); Hebrew University of Jerusalem (M.Sc., 1971); Hebrew University of Jerusalem (PhD, 1976)
- Occupations: Physical and inorganic chemist, Material scientist
- Employer: Weizmann Institute of Science
- Known for: Research of layered materials and their applications, with an emphasis on inorganic nanotubes and fullerene-like nanoparticles
- Awards: EMET Prize (2020); Israel Prize (2026)

Reshef Tenne (Hebrew: רשף טנא; born September 2, 1944) is an Israeli physical and inorganic chemist and materials scientist, Professor Emeritus in the Faculty of Chemistry at the Weizmann Institute of Science. Formerly head of the Department of Materials and Interfaces, he is a recipient of the Von Hippel Award, the EMET Prize, and the Rothschild Prize, and a member of the Israel National Academy of Sciences. He is a world-renowned expert in layered materials. In 2026, he received the Israel Prize for Chemistry and Chemical Engineering Research.

== Biography ==
=== Early life ===
Reshef Tenne was born in Kibbutz Usha, the son of Shoshana (née Hermelin) and Daniel "Danche" Tenne (originally Tannenbaum). His parents immigrated from Poland and Belarus, settled initially in Magdiel, and then moved to Usha, where Reshef and his two siblings, Ruthie and Reuven, were born. Reshef was born in a tent because his parents had cleared their shack for new immigrants. He was educated at Gush Zevulun School, where he studied under Haim Hadomi and Avraham Lifshitz, among others, but finished his studies without a matriculation certificate, as it was not customary in the kibbutz movement. He did a year of service in Kibbutz Gezer and in 1963 enlisted in military service in the Paratroopers Brigade. During his service, his father died prematurely, and he then began to complete his matriculation certificate, finishing it after his discharge.

=== Beginning of his academic career ===
Tenne began his undergraduate studies in chemistry at the Hebrew University, completing them in 1969. He continued to pursue a master's degree in chemistry under the supervision of Prof. Gabriel Stein and PhD student (in later times Prof.) Yehuda Haas, working on the photochemical reduction of water to hydrogen using europium for solar energy production. From 1971 to 1976, he studied for a doctorate in theoretical chemistry, under the joint supervision of Prof. Arieh Ben Naim and Prof. Shalom Baer. He completed a postdoctoral fellowship at the Battelle Institute in Geneva under the supervision of Dr. Erich Bergmann and returned to Israel in 1979.

=== As an independent researcher ===
Upon his return to Israel, Tenne joined Prof. Joost Manassen's research group, where he worked alongside Dr. Gary Hodes and Dr. David Cahen on photoelectrochemical cells. About two years later, he was appointed senior researcher. In 1983, he acquired the first electron microscope for materials research at the Weizmann Institute, which was shared by the faculties of chemistry and life sciences and formed the basis for what would become the Department of Chemical Research Support. In 1985, he was appointed Associate Professor, and in 1995, Full Professor. In 2014, he retired but continues to conduct active research to this day (2025). Tenne served as a visiting researcher at the Technion, the Pierre and Marie Curie University (Paris VI) in Paris, CNRS Meudon, the University of Tokyo, and the Helmholtz Institute for Renewable Energies (formerly Hahn-Meitner Institute) in Berlin. From 2000 to 2007, he served as head of the Department of Materials and Interfaces in the Faculty of Chemistry, and in 2003, he founded the Helen and Martin Kimmel Center for Nanoscale Science and was its first director until his retirement. He was the first recipient of the Drake Family Professorial chair in Nanotechnology (2004–2014). After his election as a member of the Israel National Academy of Sciences, he served for nearly a decade as head of the Committee for the Triennial Report on the State of Science in Israel, which is submitted to the Knesset (the Israeli Parliament).

== Research ==
Since the early 1980s, Tenne has been engaged in research on layered materials, and he is probably the longest-active researcher in the world working on this topic. These materials have an intra-layer structure based on strong covalent bonds, and an inter-layer structure based on weak van der Waals forces. These materials possess highly anisotropic physio-chemical properties that are fundamentally different from materials with three-dimensional symmetry, such as gallium arsenide. Early in his independent research career, he studied tungsten diselenide, and after a few years, he moved on to prepare thin films of molybdenum disulfide and tungsten disulfide, with the aim of using them to fabricate photovoltaic cells. In 1992, he discovered that in analogy to carbon fullerenes and nanotubes, nanoparticles of compounds with layered structure, like WS_{2} and MoS_{2} form hollow spherical nanoparticles, which he nicknamed fullerene-like (IF) and nanotubes (INT), respectively. Initially he collaborated with the electron microscopy expert Dr. Lev Margulis and later on with Dr. Ronit Popovitz-Biro. Since 2010, he has been working on nanotubes from misfit layered compounds (MLC), which are made of at least three elements.

Throughout his years as a researcher, Tenne authored some 500 articles and supervised about 70 research students, including Prof. Gitti Frey, currently the Dean of the Faculty of Materials Engineering in the Technion and Prof. Maya Bar-Sadan, the head of the Department of Chemistry in Ben-Gurion University of the Negev. Many researchers who worked under his supervision have joined the industry.

=== Discovery of Inorganic Nanotubes and Fullerene-like Inorganic Nanoparticles ===
Linus Pauling proposed in 1930 that layered (two-dimensional) materials with an asymmetric structure along the 'a' axis, such as chrysotile and halloysite, would spontaneously curl to form cylindrical or helical structures. This proposal was confirmed in 1950 by Bates et al. when chrysotile nanotubes were first observed. Following the discovery of carbon fullerenes in 1985, Kroto proposed that graphite nanoparticles suffer from internal instability due to dangling bonds at the edge atoms, causing them to fold and close into fullerenes. This idea was later extended to carbon nanotubes by Iijima (1991), which led Tenne to propose (1992) that nanoparticles of inorganic layered compounds, such as tungsten disulfide and molybdenum disulfide, also suffer from similar instability and form hollow closed structures – i.e., inorganic nanotubes (INT) and inorganic fullerene-like nanoparticles (IF). Subsequently, nanotubes and fullerene-like nanoparticles of many other two-dimensional materials were synthesized and studied, including BN, NiCl_{2}, Cs_{2}O, Tl_{2}O, NiClOH, TaS_{2}, H_{2}Ti_{3}O_{7}, V_{2}O_{5}, and more. Additional types of nanotubes from two-dimensional materials were investigated using computer simulations.

Tenne extended this concept in recent years and synthesized many kinds of nanotubes from the non-stoichiometric misfit layered compounds with a structure of the form (MX)_{1+γ}(TX_{2})_{m}, where M is an element like bismuth, antimony, tin, lead, or another rare element; T can be niobium, tantalum, titanium, vanadium, or chromium; X is sulfur or selenium; and γ ranges from 0.08 to 0.28. In these cases, both the Pauling mechanism (asymmetry along the 'a' axis) and the dangling bond edge-closure mechanism (Kroto-Iijima-Tenne mechanism) act conjointly, leading to a high yield of nanotubes. It can be stated that inorganic nanotubes and fullerene-like nanoparticles are metastable nanoscale manifestations of layered compounds, and can be prepared from a wide range of elements and compounds – from insulators to semiconductors, metals, and superconductors. These nanoparticles can be distinguished from the original bulk material using any available physio-chemical method.

=== Strategies for Synthesizing Nanotubes and Fullerene-like Nanoparticles ===
Tenne and his team developed new chemical strategies for synthesizing various types of nanotubes and fullerene-like nanoparticles from layered compounds, including metal dichalcogenides, halides, and oxides.

For this purpose, they used a variety of high-temperature techniques, such as chemical vapor transport, chemical vapor deposition, laser ablation, focused solar radiation, electron beam, microwave, and mechanical shock. In particular, in-depth research into the conversion of metal oxides to sulfides (or selenides) at high temperatures revealed a "surface inwards" and more recently also the "receding oxide core" mechanisms for nanotubes and fullerene-like nanoparticles. Subsequently, a large-scale process for producing pure phases of IF nanoparticles and nanotubes of WS_{_{2}} was developed in his laboratory. These studies paved the way for the commercialization of the particles for a variety of applications.

New strategies in high-temperature materials chemistry were developed for controlled doping of tungsten disulfide and molybdenum disulfide nanotubes and fullerene-like nanoparticles with trace amounts of rhenium and niobium. This doping imparted negative or positive surface charge density to the particles, respectively, and facilitated their dispersion in various liquids. In addition, hints of a phase transition from a stable (2H) semiconducting state to a metastable (1T) conducting state were found in structures doped with rhenium. The doped particles showed improved catalytic properties for hydrogen generation and improved tribological properties, likely due to self-repulsion between the surface-charged doped nanoparticles, preventing their agglomeration and precipitation.

Already at an early stage of his research, Tenne raised the possibility of hollow molybdenum disulfide nano-octahedra as the smallest fullerene-like nanostructure. These particles were later produced by laser ablation, electrical discharge, and later also by solar ablation. Both experiments and calculations showed that these structures are stable in a size range of 3-7 nanometers. Since these are the smallest closed and hollow polyhedra, they are considered the inorganic analog of C_{_{60}}, noted by Heben as "the true inorganic fullerenes". These structures are expected to also appear in many other layered compounds, and to provide a platform for new catalytic mechanisms.

Tenne predicted, and later proved, that fullerene-like nanoparticles of tungsten disulfide and molybdenum disulfide behave like spherical bearings at the nanometer level, providing exceptional solid lubrication capabilities. This work revealed a new lubrication mechanism based on the rolling of nanoparticles, characterized by a very low coefficient of friction. Furthermore, the work opened a window to a new lubrication technology, which is used for various tribological applications. Several companies are already producing and marketing these products, and medical technologies based on this corpus of work have been proposed and are under development.

=== Characterization of Tungsten Disulfide Nanotubes and Nanoparticles ===
The unique mechanical properties of tungsten disulfide nanotubes and fullerene-like nanoparticles were investigated in Tenne's laboratory using a variety of methods. They were found to withstand pressure waves of up to 21 gigapascals. Experiments of stretching, bending, and twisting on individual nanotubes showed that they possess a strength of up to 20 gigapascals – four times that of Kevlar fibers – and can withstand strains of over 10% without breaking. These properties make them suitable for reinforcing polymer nanocomposites. Such nanocomposites, containing up to 1% by weight of tungsten disulfide nanotubes or IF nanoparticles, showed improved mechanical, thermal, and tribological properties. In particular, the mechanical properties of biocompatible polymers such as PLLA, PVA, and PPF, used in medical technologies, food packaging, and tissue engineering, were improved significantly after the addition of small amounts of tungsten disulfide nanotubes.

In collaboration with other research groups, exceptional electronic properties of tungsten disulfide nanotubes were confirmed, including superconductivity with Little-Parks type oscillations, bulk photovoltaic effect, strong optical coupling effects, second harmonic generation, and applications in artificial vision and nanoelectronic memories. Nanotubes from the non-stoichiometric misfit compound (SmS)_{1.19}TaS_{2} also showed superconductivity at a temperature of 4 Kelvin. These properties may contribute in the future to quantum technologies such as ultra-dense memory devices and quantum computing. Recently, his group succeeded in achieving significant bandgap tuning between 2 and 1.5 electron-volts by synthesizing W(S_{x}Se_{1-x})_{2} type nanotubes.

== Personal life ==
Until her death, Tenne was married to Leah (née Yonas), the founder of adult education frameworks in the city of Rehovot. They had a daughter, Dana, and sons Tal and Ron (currently a faculty member at the Technion). In memory of Leah Tenne, the Israel Chemical Society annually awards the "Tenne Family Prize in Nanoscience". After Leah's death, Tenne remarried Prof. Ella Zak (née Schreiber), a faculty member and Dean of the Faculty of Sciences at Holon Institute of Technology. In 2024, Zak and Tenne founded the Zak-Tenne Prize for Materials Science, awarded by the Israel Vacuum Society. Tenne resides in Rehovot.

== Awards ==
- Battelle Institute International Research Fellowship, Geneva (1976–1978)
- Mordechai (Moma) Glickson Annual Research Prize from the Weizmann Institute of Science (1985)
- Fellow of the Israel Vacuum Society (1996)
- Fellow of the World Technology Network (2002)
- Drake Family Chair in Nanotechnology (2004)
- Kolthoff Prize from the Technion (2005)
- Materials Research Society Medal, Boston (2005)
- Rafael Scientific Research Excellence Award from the Israel Vacuum Society (2005)
- Landau Prize from Mifal Hapayis for Nanotechnology (2006)
- Fellow of the Materials Research Society (First Class of Fellows) (2008)
- European Research Council Advanced Research Grant (inaugural cycle) (2008)
- Excellence Award from the Israel Chemical Society (2008)
- Fellow of the Royal Society of Chemistry (FRSC) (2011)
- Member of the Israel National Academy of Sciences (2011)
- Plenary Lecture Award at ChinaNano 2011, Beijing (2011)
- The C.N.R. Rao Award Lecture at the 14th Annual Meeting of the Indian Chemical Research Society, Trivandrum (2012)
- Member of Academia Europaea (2012)
- Best Scientific Article of the Year Award from the Institute of Civil Engineers in the UK (2014)
- Honorary Professor at Taiwan Technological University, Taipei (2015)
- Gold Medal of the Israel Chemical Society (2015)
- Rothschild Prize (2016)
- Plenary Lecture Award at NanoTr12, Gebze University, Turkey (2016)
- Honorary Fellow of the Israeli Microscopy Society (2017)
- IUVSTA Technology Award, Malmö (2019)
- EMET Prize (2020)
- Member of the European Academy of Sciences and Arts (2021)
- American Chemical Society Materials Chemistry Award, Indianapolis (2023)
- Arthur Von Hippel Award from the Materials Research Society, Boston (2023)
- Israel Prize for Chemistry and Chemical Engineering Research (2026)
