= Myriam Yardeni =

Israeli historian

- מרים ירדני
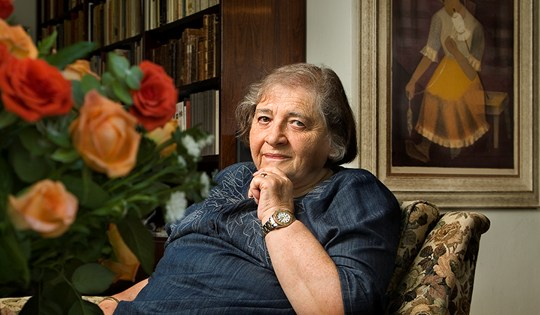
- Myriam Yardeni
- Born: Marika Jakobovits; 27 April 1932; Timișoara, Romania
- Died: 8 May 2015 (aged 83); Haifa, Israel
- Awards: Israel Prize for general history (1998); EMET Prize (2007)
- Scientific career
- Fields: History
- Workplaces: University of Haifa
- Doctoral advisor: Roland Mousnier
- Other academic advisors: Jacob Talmon

Myriam Yardeni (Hebrew: מרים ירדני; 27 April 1932 – 8 May 2015) was an Israeli historian and scholar of French history. She was professor of general history at the University of Haifa.

== Biography ==
Marika Jakobovits was born in Timișoara, in the Romanian multiethnic region of Banat, to a middle-class Jewish family. In 1950, she immigrated to Israel. She studied Hebrew at Ulpan Etzion in Jerusalem and attended a pedagogical seminary founded by Martin Buber.

At the Hebrew University of Jerusalem she completed a BA in world history and French culture, and an MA in history. Her master's thesis, written in 1961 under the guidance of Jacob Talmon, explored the life and work of Bernard Lazare, a French Jewish anarchist and journalist. In 1963, she wrote her doctorate at the Sorbonne under Roland Mousnier. During her sojourn in Paris, she studied at the Ecole des hautes études en sciences sociales (EHESS).

== Academic career ==
At the urging of Haifa's then-mayor, Abba Hushi, Yardeni returned to Haifa and joined the faculty of the University of Haifa. In 1975, she was appointed head of the world history department. She founded the university's institute for research of French history. Her work focused on several research themes - national conscience in France in the early modern period and religious minorities in French context, in particular Huguenots and Jews. She was interested in religious persecution and early modern anti-Semitism. Her extensive and innovative publications positioned her as one of the leading scholars in these fields.

Yardeni was a guest professor at CNRS, Bordeaux University, Bordeaux Montaigne University (Bordeaux III), and the religious sciences section of the École pratique des hautes études in Paris.

She retired in 2001, but continued to actively work on her research projects until her death. During these years Yardeni published several books and numerous articles, as well as participated in various conferences in Israel and abroad.

== Awards and recognition ==
- In 1998, Yardeni was awarded the Israel Prize in 1998 for general history.
- In 2007, she was awarded the EMET Prize.

== Published work ==
Haifa University posted a list of her publications.

- La conscience nationale en France pendant les guerres de religion (1559–1598) (The National Conscience in France during the Wars of Religion (1559–1598)). Publications de la Faculté des Lettres et Sciences Humaines de Paris-Sorbonne, Paris, Louvain: Editions Nauwelaerts, 1971 ("Recherches" 59).
- Utopie et révolte sous Louis XIV (Utopia and revolt under Louis XIV). Paris, Nizet, 1980.
- Le Refuge Protestant. Paris: PUF, 1985 (Coll. l'Historien, 50).
- French Protestantism and Antisemitism: Monograph on the History of Antisemitism (Hebrew). The Hebrew University of Jerusalem and the Zalman Shazar Center (in print), French edition: Albin Michel.
- Anti-Jewish Mentalities in early modern Europe, Lanham, New York, London: University Press of America, 1990 (Studies in Judaism).
- הוגנוטים ויהודים (Huguenots and Jews; in Hebrew), Jerusalem: Zalman Shazar Center for Jewish History, 1998.
- Repenser l’histoire. Aspects de l’historiographie huguenote des guerres de Religion à la Révolution (Rethinking history. Aspects of Huguenot historiography from the Wars of Religion to the French Revolution). Paris: Honoré Champion, 2000 (Vie des Huguenots 11).
- Le refuge huguenot : assimilation et culture(The Huguenot refuge: assimilation and culture). Paris, Honoré Champion, 2002 (Vie des Huguenots 22).
- Enquêtes sur l’identité de la « nation France » de la Renaissance aux Lumières (Investigations into the identity of the "French nation" from Renaissance to Enlightenment), Seyssel, Champ Vallon. 2005. Collection Epoques.
- Huguenots et Juifs (Huguenots and Jews), Paris, Honoré Champion, 2008 (Vie des Huguenots 41).
- Minorités et mentalités religieuses en Europe moderne : l'exemple des huguenots. ed. by Michaël Green, Paris, Honoré Champion, 2018 (Vie des Huguenots 80).
- Les monarchomaques de la Saint Barthélémy, unfinished project.

=== Co-authored books ===
- (ed.) Les Juifs dans l’histoire de France (The Jews in the history of France), Leiden: Brill, 1980.
- (ed.), Modernité et non conformisme en France à travers les âges (Modernity and nonconformism in France throughout the ages), in Actes du colloque..., H.A. Oberman (ed.), Leiden, Brill, 1983, ISBN 978-90-04-07087-5 (Studies in the History of Christian Thought, vol. XXVIII).
- (ed.) Idéologie et propagande (Ideology and propaganda), Paris: Picard, 1987.
- (ed.) with Ilana Zinguer, Les deux Réformes chrétiennes: propagation et diffusion (The two Christian Reforms: their propagation and diffusion), Leiden, Brill, 2004 (Studies in the History of Christian Traditions, vol. CIV).

== See also ==
- List of Israel Prize recipients
