= Zahava Solomon =

Retired Lieutenant Colonel in the Israel Defense Forces Medical Corps

- Solomon in 2016
- Citizenship: Israeli
- Education: University of Haifa (BA, MA), University of Pittsburgh (PhD)
- Occupations: Psychiatric epidemiologist, social worker, academic
- Awards: Israel Prize (2009); Emet Prize (2016); Laufer Award, ISTSS (1997)

Zahava Solomon is an Israeli health professional who is Professor Emerita of Psychiatric Epidemiology. She is a retired Lieutenant Colonel in the Israel Defense Forces Medical Corps, where she served as Head of Research in Mental Health. Her honors include the Laufer Award for Outstanding Scientific Achievement from the International Society for Traumatic Stress Studies (1997), the Israel Prize for Social Work Research (2009), and the Emet Prize in Social Sciences, Social Work (2016).

== Early life and education ==
Solomon earned a B.A. (1973) and an M.A. (1976) in social work from the University of Haifa, where her master’s thesis, Self-Acceptance and Mate Selection, was supervised by Shlomo Sharlin. She went on to earn a Ph.D. in psychiatric epidemiology from the University of Pittsburgh in 1980. Her doctoral dissertation, Stress, Vulnerability and Social Support: A Study of Depression and Anxiety in Mothers of Pre-School Children, was supervised by Evelyn Bromet and Joseph Zubin. Solomon was a Research Associate at the Western Psychiatric Institute and Clinic at the University of Pittsburgh from 1978 to 1979.

== Career ==
Solomon joined Tel Aviv University in 1992. She went on to serve as Dean of the School of Social Work, Dean of Special Programs, and Head of the Adler Research Center for Child Welfare and Protection. In 2013, she began heading the Multidisciplinary Center of Excellence for Mass Trauma Research at Tel Aviv University.

Solomon worked as a visiting professor internationally at the National University of Singapore (S. R. Nathan Professor, 2019–2022), the University of Zurich, Aarhus University in Denmark, the International University of Venice, the State University of New York at Stony Brook, and the Institute for Psychotrauma Research at the University of Southern Denmark.

== IDF and longitudinal cohort studies ==
In her former role as Head of Research in Mental Health in the IDF Medical Corps, Solomon initiated two longitudinal cohort studies that have become foundational to the field of traumatic stress research. The first has followed all combatants diagnosed with Combat Stress Reaction from the 1982 Lebanon War and their wives. The second has followed prisoners of war from the 1973 Yom Kippur War, their spouses, and offspring. These carefully matched cohorts have been prospectively followed for more than four decades across multiple assessment points, making them among the longest-running trauma studies of their kind in the world.

A 20-year longitudinal evaluation of frontline treatment for combat stress reaction, published in the American Journal of Psychiatry, found that soldiers treated close to the front line had better long-term outcomes than those evacuated to rear-echelon care. Studies conducted over 35 years of follow-up of the Yom Kippur War POW cohort, published in Psychiatry Research, documented distinct trajectories of PTSD symptoms over time, including delayed-onset and reactivated cases decades after captivity. Solomon and colleagues have also reported that these long-term PTSD trajectories are associated with accelerated premature aging and elevated mortality risk among veterans and former prisoners of war.

== Research ==
Solomon’s research focuses on the psychological and social effects of trauma, including combat stress reactions, war captivity, terrorism, and the Holocaust. A central theme of her work is the intergenerational transmission of trauma, examining how the effects of war and captivity extend to spouses and children of survivors.

Her studies of Israeli ex-prisoners of war have documented elevated rates of posttraumatic stress disorder, posttraumatic growth, and marital and family adjustment difficulties decades after captivity and Solomon’s research on combat stress reaction has examined the long-term trajectory of PTSD symptoms, the role of social support, and the stigma associated with mental health treatment in military populations.

== Editorial and professional service ==
Solomon has served on the editorial board of the Journal of Traumatic Stress since 1993, and has held editorial board positions with Traumatology, the World Journal of Psychiatry, the Journal of Medical Case Reports, and the Journal of Trauma and Loss. She was also an editorial board member for the Encyclopedia of Trauma: An Interdisciplinary Guide, edited by Charles Figley.

Solomon was an elected Board Member of the International Society for Traumatic Stress Studies (1989–1995) and chaired the Scientific Committee of the ISTSS World Conference in 1996. She also served on the American Psychiatric Association’s DSM-IV Advisory Sub-committee for Post-Traumatic Stress Disorder.

== Cultural impact ==
Solomon’s research has informed depictions of trauma and captivity in Israeli popular culture. She was consulted on the Israeli television series Hatufim (Prisoners of War), which served as the basis for the American series Homeland. Solomon also had a cameo appearance in the Academy Award-nominated animated film Waltz with Bashir.

== Books ==
- Solomon, Z. (1993). Combat Stress Reaction: The Enduring Toll of War. New York: Plenum Press (Springer Series on Stress and Coping). 248 pp.
- Solomon, Z. (1995). Coping with War-Induced Stress: The Gulf War and the Israeli Response. New York: Plenum Press (Springer Series on Stress and Coping). 254 pp.
- Maercker, A., Schützwohl, M., & Solomon, Z. (1999). Posttraumatic Stress Disorder: A Lifespan Developmental Perspective. Bern: Hogrefe & Huber Publishers. 264 pp.
- Bleich, A., & Solomon, Z. (Eds.) (2002). Mental Disability: Medical, Social and Rehabilitative Aspects. Ministry of Defense Publishing. [in Hebrew]
- Zeligman, T., & Solomon, Z. (Eds.) (2004). The Secret and Its Breaking: Issues in Incest Disclosure. Kibbutz Hameuchad Publishing. [in Hebrew]
- Solomon, Z., & Chaitin, J. (Eds.) (2007). Childhood in the Shadow of the Holocaust. Kibbutz Hameuchad Publishing.
- Lahav, Y., & Solomon, Z. (Eds.) (2019). From Reliving to Remembering – Treatments for Trauma. Resling Publishing. [in Hebrew]
- Solomon, Z. (2025). Transparent on the silver platter. Kineret, Zemora, Dvir- Publishing house. [in Hebrew]

== Awards and honors ==
- 1997: Robert S. Laufer Memorial Award for Outstanding Scientific Achievement, International Society for Traumatic Stress Studies.
- 2009: Israel Prize for Social Work — the highest distinction bestowed by the State of Israel for academic excellence.
- 2016: Emet Prize in Social Sciences, Social Work.

== Media coverage ==
The Times of Israel has featured her research on the long-term psychological toll of the Yom Kippur War on former prisoners of war, and on Israeli public resilience during periods of regional military tension. Al Jazeera has cited her four decades of research on how national trauma shapes Israeli society, and The Media Line has reported on her findings regarding delayed-onset PTSD among Israeli combat veterans.
