= Varda Rotter =

German-born-Israeli cancer researcher (born 1947)

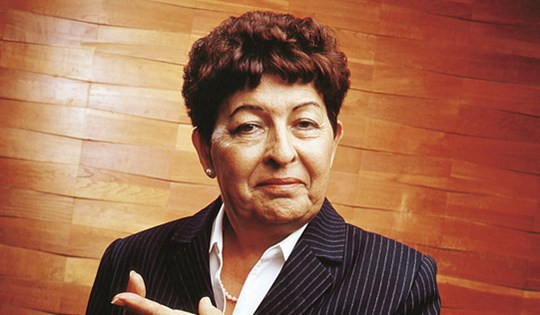
- Born: 1947 (age 78–79)

Varda Rotter (Hebrew: ורדה רוטר; born June 13, 1947) is a German-born-Israeli cancer researcher.

== Biography ==
Varda Rotter attended Bar-Ilan University where she studied microbiology for her bachelor's degree and cellular biology for her master's degree (Emet Prize Laureates, 2003) . Rotter attended the Weizmann Institute of Science to receive a doctorate in immunology (Emet Prize Laureates, 2003). After completing her studies, Rotter moved to America and became a part of a cancer research group at the Massachusetts Institute of Technology (Emet Prize Laureates, 2003).

== Academic career ==
Rotter moved back to Israel and began to do research at the Weizmann Institute (Emet Prize Laureates, 2003). She took the position of senior researcher, professor, and head of the Cellular Biology Department. She became a part of the Department of Molecular Cell Biology (Emet Prize Laureates, 2003). Currently, Rotter holds the position of Director of the Women's Health Research Center at the Weizmann Institute (Emet Prize Laureates, 2003).

Rotter's research focuses on the p53 tumor suppressor gene (Weizmann Institute of Science, n.d.). Rotter and her team believe that the malfunction of this extremely important gene or other tumor suppressor genes can cause cancers to develop (Weizmann Institute of Science, n.d.). In fact, Rotter and her team believe that if this gene is working and intact, cancers will not be able to fully develop in the first place (Weizmann Institute of Science, n.d.). Rotter's research states that while normal p53 genes are supposed to suppress the development of tumors, abnormalities in the gene can actually cause tumors to develop (Department of Molecular Cell Biology, n.d.)
