= Ruth A. Berman =

Israeli linguist

Ruth Berman
- רות ברמן
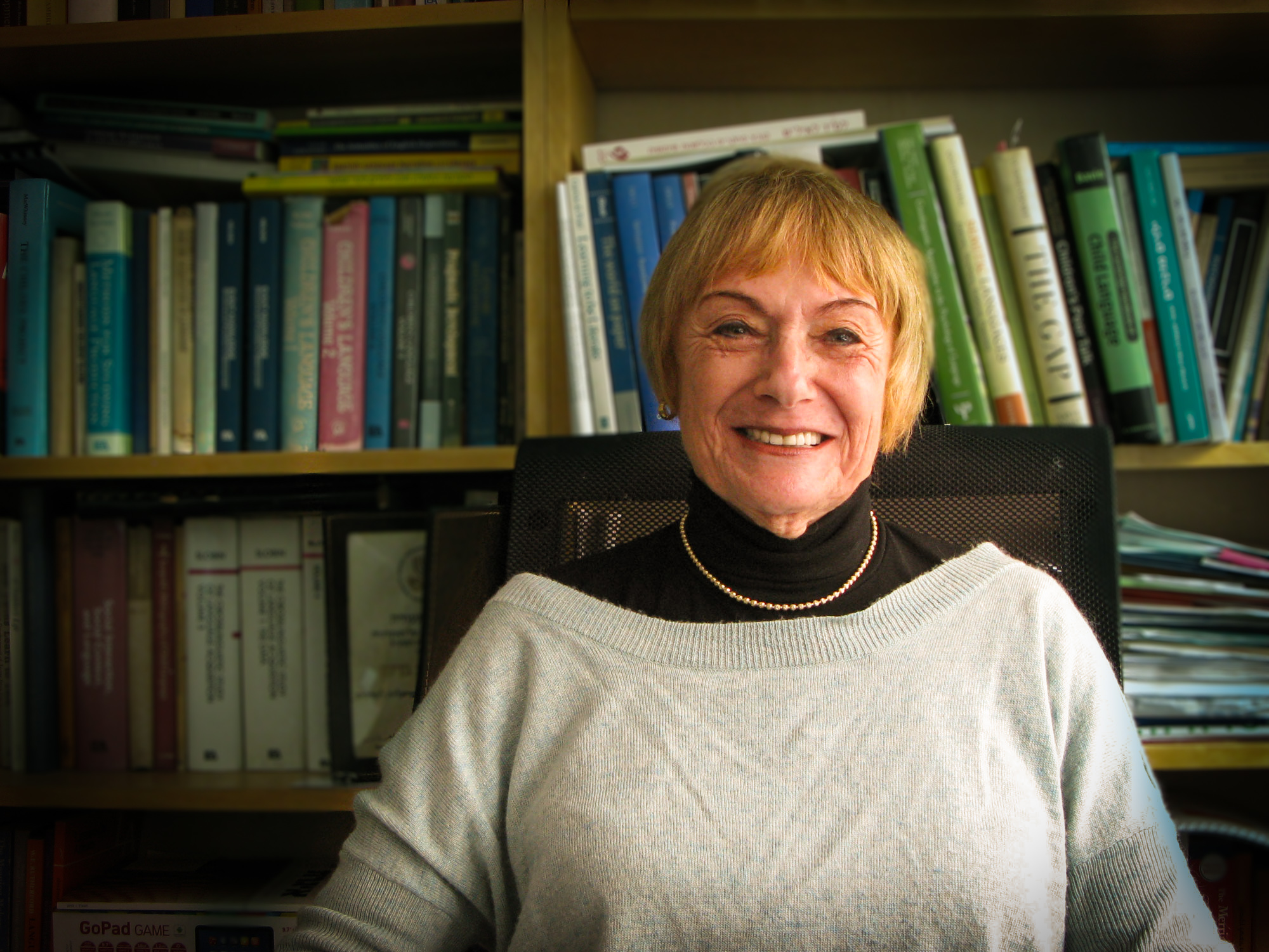
- Ruth Berman
- Born: 19 October 1935 (age 90); Cape Town, South Africa
- Occupations: Linguist, Professor Emerita
- Known for: Research on Modern Hebrew, language acquisition, and text construction abilities
- Awards: EMET Prize (2012); Honorary doctorate from Haifa University (2013); Israel Prize in Hebrew and General Linguistics (2022); Honorary life member of the Linguistics Society of America (2011)

Ruth Berman (née Aronson, Hebrew: רות ברמן; born 1935 in Cape Town, South Africa) is an Israeli linguist, Professor Emerita, Tel Aviv University, where she held the chair in “Language across the Lifespan.” Berman's research deals with the morphology, syntax, and lexicon of Modern Hebrew, first language acquisition in cross-linguistic perspective, later language development, and development of narrative and text construction abilities from early childhood across adolescence and adulthood.

== Personal ==
Ruth Aronson (later Berman) grew up in Cape Town, South Africa. She received a B.A. degree summa cum laude from the University of Cape Town in Languages and Literature (1954), the M.A. degree from Columbia University, New York, in General and Applied Linguistics (1964), and the Ph.D. from Hebrew University, Jerusalem, in Hebrew Language and Linguistics (1973).

Aronson immigrated to Israel in 1954. She was married to Yitzchak (Isadore) Berman of Moshav Beit Herut, with whom she had one daughter. Berman now resides in Tel Aviv with her partner, Israel Prize laureate, architect Yaacov Yaar.

== Academic career ==
In the 1950s and 1960s, Berman taught English as a Second Language, initially at a high school in Beersheva, then in English teacher training and supervision in high schools in the Negev and at the Hebrew University of Jerusalem. She was first exposed to the field of linguistics at the University of Edinburgh, on a grant from the British Council (1958–59). Her studies under the British linguists Firth and Halliday led to her participation in a large-scale research project on the teaching of English as a foreign language in Israel, supervised by Prof. Gina Ortar, at the Hebrew University, Jerusalem. In 1965, she began her decades-long career at Tel Aviv University, which included coordinating the compilation of the “English for Speakers of Hebrew” series of textbooks based on the principles of Hebrew-English Contrastive Linguistics. This project was conducted in the framework of the Department of English, in which Aronson-Berman established a language program based on contemporary linguistic theories that evolved into the Department of Linguistics of Tel Aviv University.

In the 1970s, Berman’s focus of interest shifted to Modern Hebrew – in morphology, lexicon, and syntax. Her doctoral dissertation (1973) investigated a range of verbal nouns in Modern Hebrew in the framework of current transformational syntactic theory. This provided the groundwork for an English-language publication on the structure of Modern Hebrew (1978) – dealing not only with nominalizations, but also with issues such as tense-aspect and the Hebrew system of binyan verb patterns – a study that to this day is a key source of reference for researchers in relevant domains. During this period, Berman also published numerous articles in English and Hebrew on various aspects of the Modern Hebrew language.

This interest in Modern Hebrew sparked a shift in her research focus in the 1980s, to the acquisition of Hebrew as a first language, which she turned into a recognized field of research in Israel and abroad, along with her student Dorit Ravid. Her studies included an examination of the development of grammar and lexicon by native Hebrew-speaking toddlers, preschoolers, and schoolchildren – research that bore fruit in a monograph on the acquisition of Hebrew as part of a major cross-linguistic series (1985). Against this background, Berman subsequently participated actively in cross-linguistic projects comparing children’s acquisition of various aspects of Hebrew with their counterparts acquiring different languages. These included research on children from 3 to 9 years of age compared with adults in command of the lexicon in English and Hebrew with Eve V. Clark (Stanford University) and on acquisition of narrative abilities in several different languages including Hebrew with Dan I. Slobin (University of California, Berkeley). This latter project constituted a driving force in the contemporary study of the acquisition of narrative abilities as a branch of psycholinguistic research.It also formed the basis for a large-scale research project, funded by the Spencer Foundation, Chicago, with Berman as Principal Investigator, comparing the abilities of grade-school, middle-school, and high-school students – speakers of seven different native languages – in construction of narrative and expository texts in speech and writing. This in turn led to advances in psycholinguistic approaches to the study of “Later Language Acquisition”, as reflected in a volume on the topic in the Trends in Language Acquisition Research (TILAR) series edited by Berman. In 2016 Berman edited another volume in this series on “Acquisition and Development of Hebrew from Infancy to Adolescence”. Language acquisition data collected from some of these projects is archived in the CHILDES Hebrew Berman Longitudinal Corpus.

== Honors and awards ==
Berman is a recipient of The EMET Prize for Art, Science and Culture in linguistics (2012). She received an honorary doctorate from Haifa University (2013), and has been a member of the Israel Academy of Sciences and Humanities since 2013. She was awarded the Israel Prize in Hebrew and General Linguistics in 2022. She was named an Honorary life member of the Linguistics Society of America (LSA) in 2011. She is also an Honorary life member of the Spanish Association for Study of Language Acquisition. And from 1993-1996 she was the President of the International Association for the Study of Child Language.

A Festschrift in her honor, Perspectives on Language and Language Development, was published in 2005.

== Published works ==
- 1969. G. Cohen and R. Aronson. The Teaching of English in Israel: A Survey. Jerusalem: Hebrew University John Dewey School of Education, 394 pp.
- 1978. R.A. Berman. Modern Hebrew Structure. Tel Aviv: University Publishing Projects, 452 pp.
- 1985. R.A. Berman. Acquisition of Hebrew. Hillsdale, NJ: Lawrence Erlbaum, 116 pp. [Also in D. I. Slobin, ed. Crosslinguistic Study of Language Acquisition, Volume I, Hillsdale, NJ: Lawrence Erlbaum, pp. 255–371]
- 1994. R.A. Berman and D. I. Slobin. Relating Events in Narrative: A Crosslinguistic and Developmental Study. Hillsdale, NJ: Lawrence Erlbaum, 748 pp.
- 2004. R.A. Berman (ed.) Language Development Across Childhood and Adolescence. Philadelphia/Amsterdam: John Benjamins.
