= Eliahu Nissim =

Israeli aeronautical engineer and academic (1933–2020)

- אליהו נסים
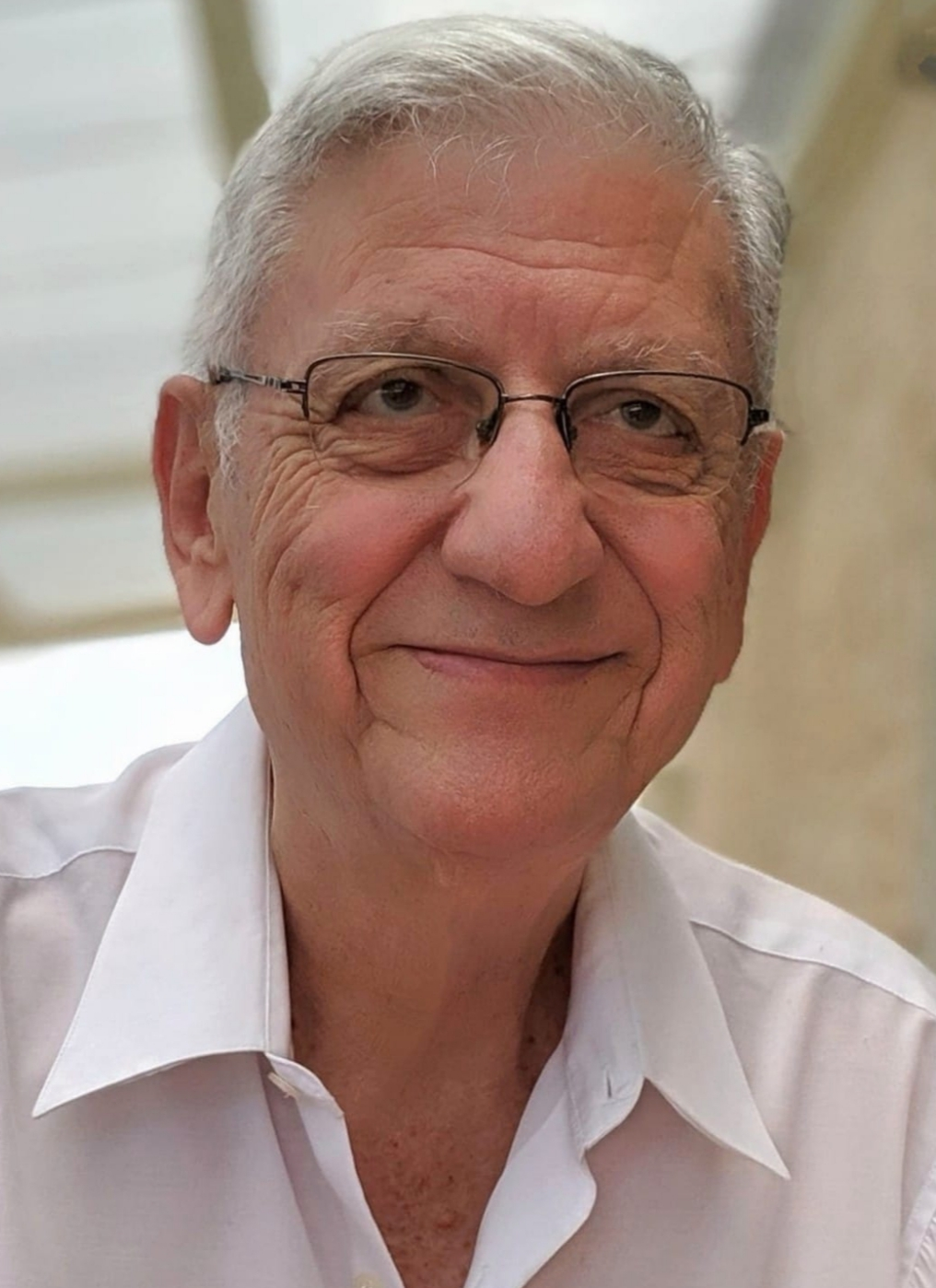
- Born: 1933; Israel
- Died: 22 February 2020 (aged 86–87)
- Known for: Sidney Goldstein Professor in Aeronautical Engineering at Technion – Israel Institute of Technology; President of the Open University of Israel

Eliahu Nissim (Hebrew: אליהו נסים; 1933 – 22 February 2020) was an Israeli aeronautical engineer and academic who was the Sidney Goldstein Professor in Aeronautical Engineering at Technion – Israel Institute of Technology, and a former president of the Open University of Israel.

== Biography ==
Nissim was born in Israel in 1933. In 1957, he graduated with a B.Sc. from the University of Bristol, in 1961 with an M.Sc. from Technion – Israel Institute of Technology, and in 1963 with a Ph.D. from the University of Bristol. He won the Sir George Taylor Prize in England in 1966. He worked at the NASA Langley Research Center in Virginia from 1969 to 1970, and again from 1975 to 1976.

Nissim taught at Technion from 1958, where he has been a full professor from 1978. He was Head of the Department of Aeronautical Engineering from 1971–73, and from 1978–80, Technion's Vice President for Academic Affairs and Senior Vice President from 1983 to 1986, and its Sidney Goldstein Professor in Aeronautical Engineering from 1989 to 1998.

He served as president of the Open University of Israel from 1997 to 2003.

Nissim died on 22 February 2020.

== Honors ==
In 1998, Nissim was named a Fellow of the American Institute of Aeronautics and Astronautics (AIAA).
