= Azar Gat =

Israeli professor (b. 1959)

- עזר גת
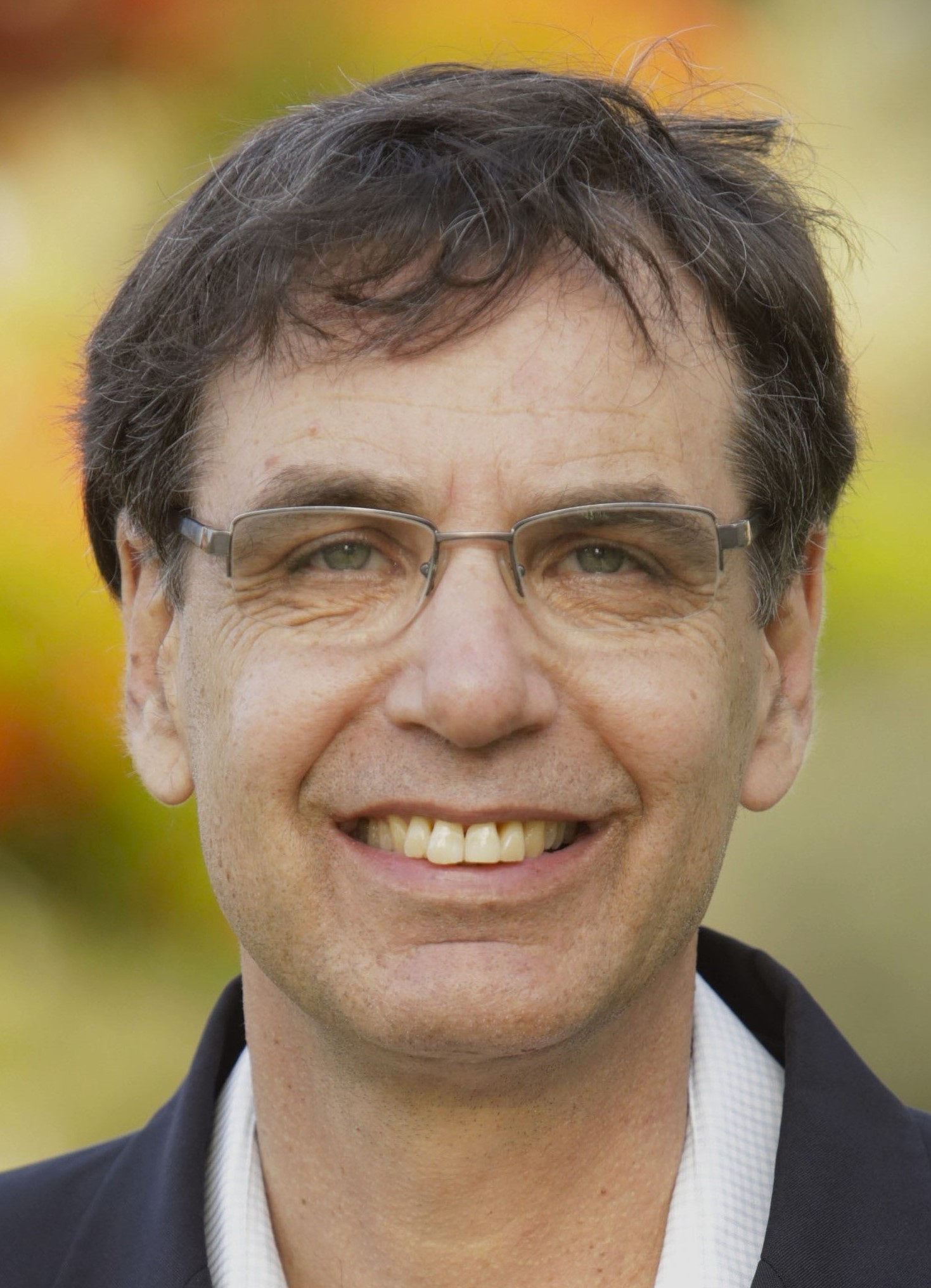
- Born: 1959 (age 66–67); Haifa, Israel
- Education: University of Haifa; Tel Aviv University; University of Oxford
- Occupations: Interdisciplinary researcher of war, nationalism and ideology
- Organization: Tel Aviv University
- Awards: EMET Prize (2019); Israel Political Science Association Best Book Award (2010); Yitzhak Sadeh Prize (2001)

Azar Gat (Hebrew: עזר גת; born 1959) is an Israeli researcher of war, nationalism and ideology, and a professor at the School of Political Science, Government, and International Relations at Tel Aviv University.

Gat has served as a visiting professor and researcher at the University of Oxford, Yale University, Stanford University, Georgetown University, Ohio State University, the University of Freiburg, LMU Munich, and the University of Konstanz. He is a three-time winner of both the Alexander von Humboldt Fellowship and research grants from Israel Science Foundation (ISF). He has also won a Rothschild Fellowship, a Fulbright Fellowship, and a British Council Fellowship. Gat was a recipient of the EMET Prize for the year 2019.

== Biography ==
Born in Israel, Gat holds a bachelor's degree from the University of Haifa (1978), a master's degree from Tel Aviv University (1983), and a doctorate from the University of Oxford (1986). He served as a major in the Israel Defense Forces (IDF).

Since 1987, Gat has been on the faculty of the Department of Political Science at Tel Aviv University (now the School of Political Science, Government and International Affairs), where he is currently a full professor and the incumbent of the Ezer Weizman Chair in National Security. He has twice served as head of the department. Gat also founded and heads the Executive MA Program in Security and Diplomacy and the International MA Program in Security and Diplomacy. He is an academic advisor to the Institute for National Security Studies (INSS).

== Publications ==
=== Books ===
- The Origins of Military Thought: From the Enlightenment to Clausewitz. Oxford University Press. 1989. ISBN 978-0198229483.
- The Development of Military Thought: The Nineteenth Century. Oxford University Press. 1992. ISBN 978-0198202462.
- Fascist and Liberal Visions of War: Fuller, Liddell Hart, Douhet, and Other Modernists. Oxford University Press. 1998. ISBN 978-0198207153.
- British Armour Theory and the Rise of the Panzer Arm: Revising the Revisionists. Palgrave Macmillan. 2000. ISBN 978-0312229528.
- Zeev Maoz, ed. (2001). War in a Changing World. University of Michigan Press. ISBN 9780472111855.
- A History of Military Thought: From the Enlightenment to the Cold War. Oxford University Press. 2001. ISBN 9780199247622.
- War in Human Civilization. Oxford University Press. 2006. ISBN 978-0199236633.
- Victorious and Vulnerable: Why Democracy Won in the 20th Century and How it is Still Imperiled. Rowman & Littlefield Publishers. 2010. ISBN 978-1442201149.
- Nations: The Long History and Deep Roots of Political Ethnicity and Nationalism. Cambridge University Press. 2012. ISBN 978-1107400023.
- The Causes of War and the Spread of Peace: But Will War Rebound?. Oxford University Press. 2017. ISBN 9780198795025.
- War and Strategy in the Modern World: From Blitzkrieg to Unconventional Terrorism. Routledge. 2018. ISBN 9781138632561.
- Ideological Fixation: From the Stone Age to Today's Culture Wars. Oxford University Press. 2022. ISBN 9780197646700.
- The Clausewitz Myth: Or the Emperor's New Clothes. Chronos Books. 2024. ISBN 9781803416212.
- Military Theory and the Conduct of War: What Is Strategy All About?. Hurst Publishers. 2025. ISBN 9781911723936.

=== Journal articles ===
- Gat, Azar (April 1992). "Clausewitz and the Marxists: Yet Another Look". Journal of Contemporary History. 27 (2): 363–384. doi:10.1177/002200949202700208. S2CID 144894230.
- Gat, Azar (July 1996). "The Hidden Sources of Liddell Hart's Strategic Ideas". War in History. 3 (3): 293–308. doi:10.1177/096834459600300303. S2CID 144246594.
- Gat, Azar (October 2005). "The Democratic Peace Theory Reframed: The Impact of Modernity". World Politics. 58 (1): 73–100. doi:10.1353/wp.2006.0017. S2CID 143286869.
- Gat, Azar (July–August 2007). "The Return of Authoritarian Great Powers". Foreign Affairs. 86 (4).
- Gat, Azar, Daniel Deudney, G. John Ikenberry, Ronald Inglehart and Christian Welzel (July–August 2009). "Which Way Is History Marching? Debating the Authoritarian Revival". Foreign Affairs. 88 (4).
- Gat, Azar (December 2009). "So Why Do People Fight? Evolutionary Theory and the Causes of War". European Journal of International Relations. 15 (4): 571–599. doi:10.1177/1354066109344661. S2CID 144675572.
- Gat, Azar (March 2013). "Is War Declining – And Why?". Journal of Peace Research. 50 (2): 149–157. doi:10.1177/0022343312461023. S2CID 146758067.
- Gat, Azar (May 2015). "Proving Communal Warfare among Hunter-Gatherers: The Quasi-Rousseauan Error". Evolutionary Anthropology. 24 (3): 111–126. doi:10.1002/evan.21446. S2CID 20075729.
- Gat, Azar (June 2019). "Is War in Our Nature? What Is Right and What Is Wrong about the Seville Statement on Violence". Human Nature. 30 (2): 149–154. doi:10.1007/s12110-019-09342-8.
- Gat, Azar (November 2024). "Is the Decline of War a Delusion? The Long Peace Phenomenon and the Modernization Peace – the Explanation that Refutes or Subsumes All Others". Journal of Strategic Studies. 47 (6–7): 776–800. doi:10.1080/01402390.2024.2421770.
