= Itamar Willner =

Israeli chemist

- איתמר וילנר
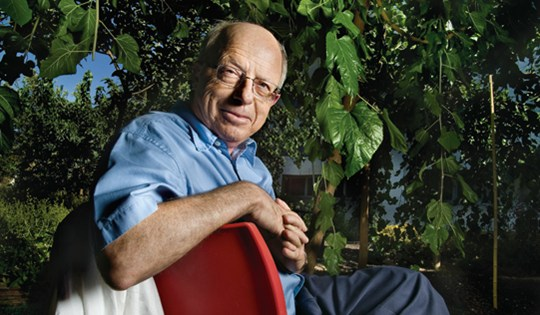
- Education: Hebrew University of Jerusalem
- Awards: Israel Prize (2002)
- Scientific career
- Fields: Chemistry
- Workplaces: Hebrew University of Jerusalem

Itamar Willner FRSC (Hebrew: איתמר וילנר) is an Israeli chemist who has been a professor at the Hebrew University of Jerusalem since 1986.

He completed his PhD in physical organic chemistry at the Hebrew University of Jerusalem in 1978.

He was awarded the Israel Prize in Chemistry in 2002. He has an h-index of 175 (as of 2025). Several of his papers were cited more than 1000 times.
