= David Cahen =

Israeli physical chemist

- דוד כאהן
- Born: August 14, 1947 (age 79); Vucht, The Netherlands
- Education: Hebrew University of Jerusalem (B.Sc., 1969); Northwestern University (PhD, 1973)
- Occupations: Chemist, Material scientist
- Employer: Weizmann Institute of Science
- Known for: Research of bioelectronics, opto-electronic materials, and their application in the field of renewable energy

David Cahen (Hebrew: דוד כאהן; born August 14, 1947) is an Israeli chemist and materials scientist, Professor Emeritus in the Faculty of Chemistry at the Weizmann Institute of Science and former Head of the Department of Materials and Interfaces (now part of "Molecular Chemistry and Materials Science"). He is an expert in renewable energy, bioelectronics, and optoelectronic materials. Among other awards, he received the Gold Medal of the Israel Chemical Society for 2024.

== Biography ==
=== Early life ===
David (Ferdinand) Cahen was born in the village of Vught in the south of the Netherlands. He is the son of Henriette ("Jet", née Elion) and Max Cahen, Holocaust survivors whose ancestors came to the Netherlands in the 17th and 19th century, from Portugal and the Ottoman Palestine and from the Alsace via Germany. He is the brother of Geertruida Helena (Truus) Wertheim and Joel Jacob; his great uncle from his mother’s side was the Dutch politician, early socialist Salomon Rodrigues de Miranda.

His grade and high school education was in the Netherlands and he developed an interest in science from a young age. Inspired by his high school teacher, he decided to study chemistry, and in 1965, he started chemistry studies at the University of Amsterdam. About half a year later, he immigrated to Israel, where he continued for a B.Sc. degree in physics and chemistry at the Hebrew University of Jerusalem, which he completed in 1969. He traveled to the United States to pursue a direct Ph.D. in Chemistry and Materials Science at Northwestern University, including one semester at Stanford University where he researched high-temperature superconductors. His doctoral studies, supervised by Profs. James A. Ibers (Chem.) and. J. Bruce Wagner Jr. (Materials Science), focused on platinum chain compounds and was awarded in 1973.

=== Independent career ===
Upon his return to Israel, he conducted two postdoctoral studies: initially, he was at the Weizmann Institute of Science, working on membrane biophysics under the supervision of Prof. Ora Kedem, and then he shifted to photosynthesis research under the supervision of Prof. Shmuel Malkin. He continued this research in collaboration with Prof. Itzhak Ohad at the Hebrew University.

In 1976, he joined the Department of Structural Chemistry at the Weizmann Institute. In 1993, he was appointed Associate Professor and in 1998 he became Full Professor. In 2017, he became emeritus prof., but continues to be actively involved in research. After his retirement, he ran the research group of Prof. Arie Zaban at Bar-Ilan University, t a Zaban's request upon Zaban’s appointment as Bar-Ilan University President until 2023.

=== Management and advisory roles ===
In 2006, he co-founded the Energy and Sustainability Research Initiative at the Weizmann Institute (now the Institute for Environmental Sustainability), and served as its first director until 2017. He also served as director of the Minerva Center for Supramolecular Architecture and as the first director of the Mary and Tom Beck Canadian Center for Alternative Energy Research. He founded the Minerva Center for Self-Healing Systems for Energy and Sustainability.

From 2007–2012, he served as Head of the Department of Materials and Interfaces, before it merged with the Department of Organic Chemistry to form the Department of Molecular Chemistry and Materials Science, where he is currently a member. Over the years, he served as a member and chair of numerous professional committees at the Weizmann Institute, and among other roles, he chaired the Chemistry Teaching Committee at the Graduate School of the Weizmann Institute of Science.

Cahen served as an energy consultant for several companies and as chairman of the advisory board of Orion-Solar (later 3G Solar). He was a visiting professor at major universities around the world. For many years, he taught courses in solid-state physics and chemistry of materials, and continues to teach on energy and sustainability, both in Israel and worldwide.

== Research ==
Cahen has authored over 500 articles, written dozens of book chapters, and holds dozens of patents. Cahen is one of the few Israeli researchers whose H-index exceeds 110.

=== Bioelectronics and Optoelectronic Materials ===
Cahen contributed significantly to the field of molecular optoelectronics, especially in understanding electron transport through molecules and in using organic molecules to improve the performance of electronic devices, in partnership with Prof. Abraham Shanzer. He showed that chemical modification of semiconductors using organic molecules can control the electronic conduction properties of diodes and solar cells, and demonstrated that this effect exists even when the molecular layer is discontinuous. This opened new possibilities that are now used for interface engineering in organic and inorganic semiconductor devices.

Together with Shanzer and Ron Naaman, Cahen developed the Molecular Controlled Semiconductor Resistor, a sensor platform based on a cooperative molecular field effect. This platform is being further developed by various research groups in academia and industry. Furthermore, Cahen was a pioneer in the use of controlled molecular monolayers directly bonded to silicon. He created high-quality silicon-molecular monolayer junctions, allowing for doping within them.

Moreover, he and his collaborators demonstrated that small organic molecules can act like thicker insulators, creating metal-insulator-semiconductor (MIS) systems without a physical insulator. He also showed that these discoveries can be used to create new metal-molecule-semiconductor solar cells. Cahen created, built, and tested the first reliable protein monolayer system for solid-state electron transport studies through proteins. He showed (together with prof Mordechai Sheves) that the protein bacteriorhodopsin is a surprisingly efficient electron conductor, even though it lacks that role in nature.. This research was extended to other proteins (azurin, photosynthetic reaction centres and albumins) and has implications for future bioelectronics and electron transfer in proteins.

Cahen introduced the concepts of LUSO and HOSO (instead of LUMO and HOMO, where the letter S stands for "System") and corrected the accepted model for describing conduction through molecules. He proposed, with Prof. Antoine Kahn from Princeton University, using the induced density of surface states model for molecular electronics junctions, thereby identifying non-bonding orbitals at the interface between a molecule and a surface as the site of electron transport.

=== Chemistry of Photovoltaic Materials ===
Cahen contributed to the study of materials chemistry, particularly in the field of photovoltaic materials, interfaces, and devices. In his early years as an independent researcher, he collaborated closely with Profs. Gary Hodes and Joost Manassen, and the three worked on photoelectrochemical solar cells. He argued that separating photovoltaic conversion from chemical synthesis would always be preferred if efficient electrochemical methods exist that can be carried out in dark conditions.

One of Cahen's key achievements is his contribution to "second-generation" solar cells (CIS, CIGS, CdTe). Together with Dr. Rommel Noufi from the NREL, then SERI lab in the USA, he provided a chemical explanation for the then-existing need to heat the cell in an oxygen-rich environment to optimize complex polycrystalline solar cells. He showed, since then that this model has broad applications beyond solar cells, including in organic polycrystalline materials. Additionally, he co-discovered, with Prof H.-W. Schock (Stuttgart) that the growth of thin CIGS layers occurs via a "vapor-liquid-solid" (VLS) mechanism.

Cahen also discovered that using ordinary glass, a relatively inexpensive material, is crucial for creating optimal CIGS cells. He found that metastable device structures can be formed in homogeneous materials using an external electric field, and determined that this results from electrical drift of copper ions. It was proven that the mobility of copper ions in CIS and CIGS makes these materials radiation-resistant and stable, thanks to their self-healing properties. Cahen also clarified the paradox by which certain polycrystalline solar cells outperform single-crystal cells. Together with Gary Hodes, he provided guidelines for the stabilization of CdTe solar cells, based on their discovery that cells instability is due to air exposure.

Further contributions by Cahen include research on halide perovskite-based solar cells, where he showed (in part with Hodes and Dan Oron) that the halide perovskites can recover from damage, they self-heal. Together with Hodes he also found that they can be stabilized by removing the organic part. He emphasized the importance of their mechanical softness as another expression of the root-cause for their remarkable optoelectronic properties. He also showed that there are chemical limits to device miniaturization due to the fundamental chemical instability of the basic p-n junction.

=== Mentoring ===
Cahen mentored dozens of students who became faculty members in Israel and worldwide, including: Shahar Richter from Tel Aviv University, Yigal Levin from the Hebrew University, Adi Salomon and Hagai Spaisman from Bar-Ilan University, Eran Edri, Iris Visoly-Fisher and Yevgeny Rakita from Ben-Gurion University of the Negev, Igor Lubomirsky and Omer Yaffe from the Weizmann Institute, Arava Zohar from the Technion, Ellen Moons from Karlstad University, Merlin Bruening from University of Notre Dame, Lior Sepunaruev from University of California, Santa Barbara, Leonid Chernyak from University of Central Florida, Jamal Gaboun from Bethlehem University, and Shaibal Sarkar from IIT-Bombayia. Others made and make their careers in mainly electronic industries in Israel and abroad. Former postdoctoral fellows and visiting scientists found their way to academic positions on several continents.

== Awards ==
- Scholarship from Northwestern University
- Ernest David Bergmann Prize (1980)
- Association of Jewish-Polish Ex-Servicemen in Great Britain Prize for Electronic Devices Research (1998)
- Roland and Sylvia Schaefer Professorial Chair for Energy Research (2002)
- Edwards Research Prize of the Israel Vacuum Society (2003)
- Landau Prize for Chemistry (2008)
- Kolthoff Prize (2009)
- AVS Fellow (2010)
- Israel Chemical Society Prize for Outstanding Research (2012)
- Materials Research Society Fellow (2013)
- Helmholtz International Fellow (2018–2022)
- Prof. Rao Ramakrishna Visiting Scientist Fellowship from the Indian Institute of Science in Bangalore (2018)
- Gold Medal of the Israel Chemical Society (2024)

== Personal life ==
Cahen has been married since 1983 to artist Geula Meruk-Cahen (née Pimentel) and is a father of four: Yael, Yair, Maya, and Anat. He resides in Rehovot. He is fluent in several languages, enjoys hiking, cycling, and history.

== Selected publications ==
- TM Brenner, DA Egger, L Kronik, G Hodes, D Cahen. Hybrid organic—inorganic perovskites: low-cost semiconductors with intriguing charge-transport properties. Nature Reviews Materials 1 (1), 1-16 (2016).
- M Kulbak, D Cahen, G Hodes. How Important Is the Organic Part of Lead Halide Perovskite Photovoltaic Cells? Efficient CsPbBr3 Cells. The journal of physical chemistry letters 6 (13), 2452-2456 (2015).
- PK Nayak, S Mahesh, HJ Snaith, D Cahen. Photovoltaic solar cell technologies: analysing the state of the art. Nature Reviews Materials 4 (4), 269-285 (2019).
- A Salomon, D Cahen, S Lindsay, J Tomfohr, VB Engelkes, CD Frisbie. Comparison of electronic transport measurements on organic molecules. Advanced Materials 15 (22), 1881-1890 (2003).
- M Kulbak, S Gupta, N Kedem, I Levine, T Bendikov, G Hodes, D Cahen. Cesium enhances long-term stability of lead bromide perovskite-based solar cells. The journal of physical chemistry letters 7 (1), 167-172 (2016).
- D Cahen, G Hodes, M Grätzel, JF Guillemoles, I Riess. Nature of photovoltaic action in dye-sensitized solar cells. The Journal of Physical Chemistry B 104 (9), 2053-2059 (2000).
- D Cahen, A Kahn. Electron energetics at surfaces and interfaces: concepts and experiments. Advanced Materials 15 (4), 271-277 (2003).
- J Bisquert, D Cahen, G Hodes, S Rühle, A Zaban. Physical chemical principles of photovoltaic conversion with nanoparticulate, mesoporous dye-sensitized solar cells. The Journal of Physical Chemistry B 108 (24), 8106-8118 (2004).
- P Schulz, E Edri, S Kirmayer, G Hodes, D Cahen, A Kahn. Interface energetics in organo-metal halide perovskite-based photovoltaic cells. Energy & Environmental Science 7 (4), 1377-1381 (2014).
- E Edri, S Kirmayer, A Henning, S Mukhopadhyay, K Gartsman, Y Rosenwaks, G Hodes, D Cahen. Why lead methylammonium tri-iodide perovskite-based solar cells require a mesoporous electron transporting scaffold (but not necessarily a hole conductor). Nano letters 14 (2), 1000-1004 (2014).
- C Zuo, HJ Bolink, H Han, J Huang, D Cahen, L Ding. Advances in perovskite solar cells. Advanced Science 3 (7), 1500324 (2016).
