= Sidney Goldstein =

American demographer (1927–2019)

- Born: August 4, 1927; New London, Connecticut, U.S.
- Died: August 5, 2019 (aged 92); Lexington, Kentucky, U.S.
- Education: University of Pennsylvania (PhD)
- Occupation: Demographer

Sidney Goldstein (August 4, 1927 – August 5, 2019) was an American demographer. He was George Hazard Crooker University Professor at Brown University from 1977 to 1993.

== Life ==
Sidney Goldstein was born in New London, Connecticut. He attended the University of Connecticut, graduating with high distinction and receiving the senior honors book prize with a Bachelor of Arts degree in sociology in 1949. He earned a Master of Arts degree in 1951. Goldstein then completed his doctoral studies at the University of Pennsylvania where he received his PhD in 1953.

After spending two years at the University of Pennsylvania as an instructor, Goldstein took up a position at Brown University in 1955 and remained there for the rest of his career; he was appointed an associate professor in 1957, a full professor in 1960 and then George Hazard Crooker University Professor in 1977. At Brown, he also founded the Population Studies and Training Center in 1960 and served as its first director until 1989. He was also Chair of the Sociology Department from 1963 to 1970. He retired in 1993 to an emeritus professorship. Outside of Brown, Goldstein served as president of the Population Association of America (1975–76). In 2005, he received the Laureate Award from the International Union for the Scientific Study of Population, and in 2011 received the Lifetime Achievement Award from the Association for the Social Scientific Study of Jewry (from who he had also received the Marshall Sklare Award in 1992).

== Research ==
Goldstein's research has focused on population distribution, urbanization and internal migration, especially in Southeast Asia and China and in relation to Jewish demography. According to the Population Association of America, Goldstein is "internationally recognized for his long-standing and fundamental contributions to the study of urbanization and population mobility. He contributed significantly to the field with the development of the concept of repeat migration ... [and] pioneered new techniques for the collection and recording of demographic data, including the use of administrative and other records to complement surveys."

== Personal life ==
Goldstein was married; his wife Alice Dreifuss Goldstein assisted with much of his earlier research on repeat migration and co-authored a number articles with him. Goldstein died on 5 August 2019, aged 92; he was survived by his wife and three children.
