= List of Israeli classical composers =

The following is a list of Israeli classical composers.

== A ==
- Claude Abravanel (1924–2012)
- Ayal Adler (born 1968)
- Yedidya Admon (1894–1982)
- Daniel Akiva (born 1953)
- Gil Aldema (1928–2014)
- Haim Alexander (1915–2012)
- Neta Alony (born 1945)
- Yardena Alotin (1930–1994)
- Israel Amidan (1921–1968)
- Emanuel Amiran-Pougatchov (1909–1993)
- Avraham (Avi) Eilam-Amzallag (1941–2018)
- Atar Arad (born 1945)
- Chaya Arbel (1921–2007)
- Alexander Argov (1914–1992)
- Menachem Avidom (1908–1995)
- Eitan Avitsur (1941–2018)
- Tzvi Avni (born 1927)
- Gad Avrahami (born 1952)

== B ==
- Rami Bar-Niv (born 1945)
- Josef Bardanashvili (born 1948)
- Ofer Ben-Amots (born 1955)
- Paul Ben-Haim (1897–1984)
- Bart Berman (born 1938)
- Gary Bertini (1927–2005)
- Nimrod Borenstein (born 1969)
- Alexander Uriah Boskovich (1907–1964)
- Yehezkel Braun (1922–2014)
- Max Brod (1884–1968)

== C ==
- Dov Carmel (born 1932)
- Shai Cohen (born 1968)
- Chaya Czernowin (born 1957)

== D ==
- Michael Damian (born 1954)
- Avner Dorman (born 1975)

== E ==
- Abel Ehrlich (1915–2003)
- Dror Elimelech (born 1956)
- Amos Elkana (born 1967)

== F ==
- Richard Farber (born 1945)
- Sarah Feigin (1928–2011)
- Tsippi Fleischer (born 1946)

== G ==
- Rachel Galinne (born 1949)
- Jacob Gilboa (1920–2007)
- Shlomo Gronich (born 1949)

== H ==
- Yotam Haber (born 1977)
- Andre Hajdu (1932–2016)
- Gilad Hochman (born 1982)
- Eres Holz (born 1977)

== I ==
- Abraham Zevi Idelsohn (1882–1938)
- Gabriel Iranyi (born 1946)

== K ==
- Mark Kopytman (1929–2011)
- Matti Kovler (born 1980)
- Larissa Kofman (born 1974)

== L ==
- Yehoshua Lakner (1924–2003)
- Marc Lavry (1903–1967)
- Sarah Levi-Tanai (1911–2005)

== M ==
- Ella Milch-Sheriff (born 1954)
- Nami Melumad (born 1988)
- Ami Maayani

== N ==
- Sergiu Natra (1924–2021)
- Lior Navok (born 1971)

== O ==
- Betty Olivero (born 1954)
- Ben-Zion Orgad (1926–2006)

== P ==
- Oedoen Partos (1907–1977)
- Boris Pigovat (born 1953)
- Sally Pinkas (born 1958)

== R ==
- Shulamit Ran (born 1949)
- Mordechai Rechtman (1926–2023)

== S ==
- Leon Schidlowsky (1931–2022)
- Michael Seltenreich (born 1988)
- Dov Seltzer (born 1932)
- Mordechai Seter (1916–1994)
- Lior Shambadal (born 1950)
- Arie Shapira (1943–2015)
- Israel Sharon (born 1966)
- Naomi Shemer (1930–2004)
- Noam Sheriff (1935–2018)
- Verdina Shlonsky (1905–1990)
- Gil Shohat (born 1973)
- Max Stern (born 1947)
- Erich Walter Sternberg (1891–1974)
- Joachim Stutschewsky (1891–1982)

== T ==
- Josef Tal (1910–2008)
- Yoav Talmi (born 1943)
- Doron Toister (born 1957)
- Issak Tavior (born 1943)

== W ==
- Moshe Wilensky (1910–1997)
- Amnon Wolman (born 1955)
- Orit Wolf (born 1974)

== V ==
- Emanuel Vahl (born 1938)

== Y ==
- Yehuda Yannay (1937–2023)
- Yitzhak Yedid (born 1971)
- Boris Yoffe (born 1968)
- Benjamin Yusupov (born 1962)

== Z ==
- Moshe Zorman (born 1952)
- Inon Zur (born 1965)
