= Bracha Zefira =

Israeli singer

Bracha Zefira ברכה צפירה
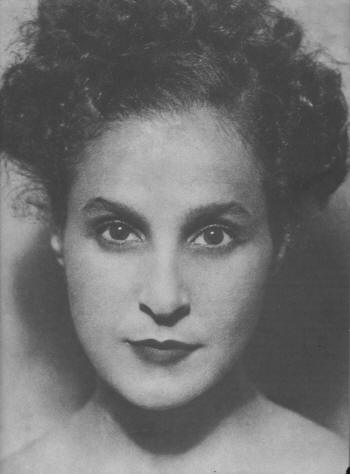
- Bracha Tzfira in the 1940's

Background information
- Born: 15 April 1910; Jerusalem, Mutasarrifate of Jerusalem, Ottoman Empire
- Died: 1 April 1990 (aged 79) Tel Aviv, Israel
- Genres: Hebrew song (Zemer Israel), ethnic melodies
- Years active: 1929–mid-1970s

Bracha Zefira (Hebrew: ברכה צפירה, also spelled Braha Tzfira; 15 April 1910 – 1 April 1990) was a pioneering Israeli folk singer, songwriter, musicologist, and actress of Yemenite Jewish origin. She is credited with bringing Yemenite and other Middle Eastern Jewish music into the mix of ethnic music in Palestine to create a new "Israeli style", and opening the way for other Yemenite singers to succeed on the Israeli music scene. Her repertoire, which she estimated at more than 400 songs, included Yemenite, Bukharan, Persian, Ladino, and North African Jewish folk songs, and Arabic and Bedouin folk songs and melodies.

Born in Jerusalem to Yemenite Jewish immigrants, she was orphaned of both parents by the age of three. She was raised by a succession of Sephardi Jewish foster families in the city and imbibed the musical tradition of each, as well as the local Arabic songs. She rose to stardom in the 1930s with her musical interpretations of Yemenite and Middle Eastern Jewish folk songs, accompanied by Western arrangements on piano by Nahum Nardi. In the 1940s she began collaborating with art music composers such as Paul Ben-Haim, Marc Lavry, Alexander Uriah Boskovich, Noam Sheriff, and Ben-Zion Orgad, performing her songs with classical music ensembles and orchestras. She was popular in Palestine, Europe, and the United States. In 1966, she received the Engel Prize for her musical contribution.

== Early life ==
Bracha Zefira was born in Jerusalem, in the Ottoman Mutasarrifate of Jerusalem, in 1910. Her father, Yosef Zefira, had immigrated to the Land of Israel from Sanaa, Yemen, in 1877, and resided in the Nachalat Zvi neighborhood of Jerusalem. Here he married Na'ama Amrani, also a Yemenite Jew. Na'ama died giving birth to Bracha, and Yosef succumbed to typhus when Bracha was three years old.

Bracha's uncle in Jerusalem took her in, but she ran away from his home at the age of five. She was adopted by a family in the Bukharim Quarter, where she was surrounded by Persian Jewish neighbors. Three years later, when that family left Jerusalem, Bracha lived with a widow in the Yemin Moshe neighborhood, where the neighbors were mostly Sephardi Jews from Salonika. Bracha imbibed the religious liturgies, piyyutim, and festive songs of each culture she lived alongside, which would manifest in her later musical career. She was also exposed to Arabic songs that she heard in the city; she and her friends would append lyrics from Hebrew poems to them.

She attended school in the Old City and was also a student at the Lämel School (often misspelled 'Lemel School') in central Jerusalem. In her early teens, she enrolled at the Meir Shfeya youth village located near Zikhron Ya'akov in northern Israel. There her musical talent was recognized by Hadassah Calwary, a teacher and wife of the village director, and Bracha was asked to perform for students and teachers on Friday nights, singing the Shabbat zemirot. The school decided that she should develop her talent at the Kedma Music School in Jerusalem, but a few months after transferring there, Zefira was sent by her conservatory teachers to Tel Aviv to study acting instead.

In 1927, Zefira was accepted into the Palestine Theatre and its acting studio, founded by Menachem Gnessin. However, the theatre produced only a few plays before closing that same year. Zefira then joined the satirical theatre company HaKumkum (The Kettle), acting and singing with the company until it disbanded in 1929.

Henrietta Szold, then head of Youth Aliyah, arranged for her to study acting and music at the studio of Max Reinhardt in Berlin. During her time in Germany, Zefira sang before notable personages including Albert Einstein and Max Nordau, and also performed at Jewish venues around the city. She always appeared with loose hair and bare feet, explaining that this was "out of a desire to feel the earth".

== Collaboration with Nahum Nardi ==
Zefira met Russian-born pianist Nahum Nardi at one of her performances in the Berlin Jewish community center. Nardi had immigrated to Palestine in 1923, but returned to Berlin in 1929 to pursue his musical studies. Zefira asked him to listen to some of her songs and to improvise arrangements for them. In her book she wrote:

I sang Bialik's "Yesh Li Gan" and "Bein Nahar Prat" for him, and Sephardi piyyutim ... and other songs that I was used to singing from Shefeyah. He was a quick study with an excellent ear and a light touch at the piano, and was familiar with Hebrew lyrics, although from a traditional galut (Diaspora) perspective. His playing and the simple harmonies electrified me. I felt that the song had taken on new sounds …

Blending Zefira's Oriental Jewish songs with Nardi's Western musical arrangements, the two first appeared together in concert in Berlin in 1929 and went on to perform in Poland, Romania, the Czech Republic, and Austria. Nardi wrote arrangements for the songs Zefira had heard as a child, including Yemenite, Persian, and Bukharan Jewish songs, Bedouin songs, and melodies of Palestinian Arabs. Zefira sang and added dramatic gestures to her performances, which were favorably received by critics. An advertisement for one of their shows in Poland in 1929 in the Yiddish Tagblatt newspaper in Lublin showed a picture of Zefira dressed in traditional Yemenite garb and jewelry, with bare feet and uncovered arms, which "evoked the myths about women of the Orient".

In 1930 the pair returned to Palestine. Zefira continued collecting folk songs from Middle Eastern Jewish, Arab, and Bedouin sources, to which Nardi wrote piano arrangements. Among Zefira's sources were old women from Middle Eastern Jewish communities; Yitzhak Navon, the scion of a Sephardic family; and Yehiel Adaki, a Yemenite musicologist. Zefira sang the Sephardi and Yemenite songs in their original languages and appended Hebrew lyrics to the Arab and Bedouin songs. Nardi also composed children's songs. The two performed a concert called Mi- Zimrat haaretz ("Songs of Palestine"), which included "songs from Yemen, Arab songs, shepherd's tunes, traditional zemirot, prayers and Sephardi songs".

Zefira and Nardi married in 1931 and embarked on a successful local and international career. In addition to appearing in concert halls, kibbutzim, and schools in Palestine, they performed in Alexandria and Cairo, Egypt, Jewish venues in Europe, and in the United States. On a 1937 U.S. tour, they recorded three phonograph records for Columbia Records.

=== Cultural impact ===
The Sephardi-Ashkenazi partnership of Zefira and Nardi spearheaded the "ethnic integration" of Palestinian theatre and the local music scene in the late 1920s and early 1930s. In Tel Aviv, "their appearances were considered an integral part of the Tel Aviv cultural scene. Huge crowds gathered at the Beit Ha-Am and Gan Rinah halls, where the duo appeared with no microphone, set or orchestral accompaniment". The first radio program aired by the Palestine Broadcasting Service from the Palace Hotel in Tel Aviv opened with Zefira singing "La-Midbar Sa'enu", which became "the first song to be broadcast in Palestine". Zefira and Nardi also appeared on a 1936 Carmel newsreel performing "Shir Ha- 'avoda Ve-ha-melakha" by Hayim Nahman Bialik.

Zefira's interpretation and presentation of Yemenite musical traditions influenced other European Jewish composers who were contributing new works to Hebrew song. While folk songs from the Jewish diaspora had been shunned in favor of new, Hebrew-language folk songs, Yemenite melodies were considered the original "Israeli idiom". Moreover, according to the Journal of Synagogue Music: "the female Yemenite voice was seen as an ideal vehicle for performing Hebrew songs; it was thought to convey an Oriental/biblical sonority". Zefira is credited with bringing Yemenite and other Middle Eastern Jewish music into the mix of ethnic music in Palestine to create a new "Israeli style", and opening the way for other Yemenite singers to succeed on the Israeli music scene.

== Other collaborations ==
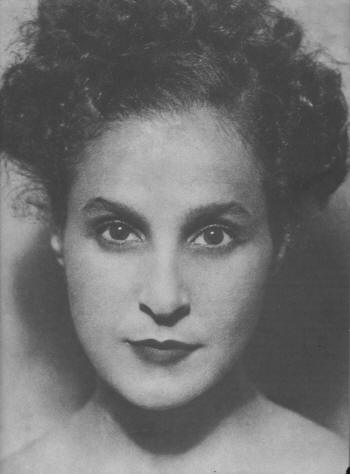
Zefira in the 1940s

Zefira and Nardi parted ways both professionally and personally in 1939. Zefira wanted to add works by other composers, notably Yedidia Admon, Emanuel Amiran, and Matityahu Shelem, to their repertoire, but Nardi refused. The couple divorced in 1939 but continued to perform together until July of that year. Zefira began collaborating with other composers while Nardi pursued his concert career with other singers. Nardi sued Zefira to obtain the copyrights for their joint compositions, but Zefira proved to the court that she had been the one who had sourced the original material.

Over the following decade, Zefira called on numerous other composers not to improvise arrangements for her songs, as Nardi had done, but to arrange the melodies that she sang for them. These composers specialized in art music rather than Hebrew song, composing works for piano, chamber music ensemble, and orchestra. Zefira began billing herself as a classical rather than popular singer. While Zefira wanted her new composers to hear the songs firsthand from the families and members of the ethnic groups she sourced, they preferred to hear her sing and compose the arrangement accordingly. Paul Ben-Haim, who wrote a total of 35 arrangements for Zefira, preferred Sephardi song. He used many of the melodies he learned from her in her major compositions. though his and other composers' approach to Zefira, and to the melodies they learned from her, has been critqued as reflecting a superficial, exotic attitude. Ödön Pártos composed arrangements for her Yemenite songs; and Marc Lavry opted to arrange "songs with a light and danceable style". Hanoch Jacoby also composed numerous arrangements for Zefira, including classical chamber ensemble and trumpet-only accompaniment. The British composer Benjamin Frankel created arrangements for Zefira's Columbia recordings and her 1948 concert at Wigmore Hall, London. Zefira also collaborated with the composers Alexander Uriah Boskovich, Mendel Mahler-Kelkshtein, Noam Sheriff, and Ben-Zion Orgad.

Though Zefira aimed to synchronize Eastern melodies with Western instruments, the marriage was not always harmonious. On her recordings, "differences in intonation were either ignored or smoothed down", but in concert, Zefira often was not pleased with the style of Western-trained musicians or the sound production of Western instruments, especially the strings. In one instance, she asked the musicians "to play without vibrato, to arpeggiate chords, and to strike the wooden backs of the instruments with their fingers", but they would not comply.

Zefira appeared on concert stages in Palestine to critical acclaim from 1940 to 1947. In 1942, she performed with the Palestine Symphony Orchestra, becoming the first soloist to sing Middle Eastern Jewish and Ladino songs with that group. In 1948, she launched a two-and-a-half-year European and U.S. tour, which included performances in displaced persons camps sponsored by the Jewish Agency and the American Jewish Joint Distribution Committee. A New York Times review of her first U.S. recital in May 1949 noted: "[I]t was the exotic nature of her interpretations that gave them an air of novelty and lent them special fascination". In 1950, she sang in a Histadrut Hanukkah Festival at Carnegie Hall. She gave her farewell performance at Town Hall on 6 April 1950. The latter concert included "traditional, folk, shepherd and children's songs" based on "authentic Hebrew melodies", and "love songs, prayers, psalms, and poems" from Yemenite, Persian, and Ladino traditions, accompanied by a 35-piece orchestra.

== Musical repertoire ==
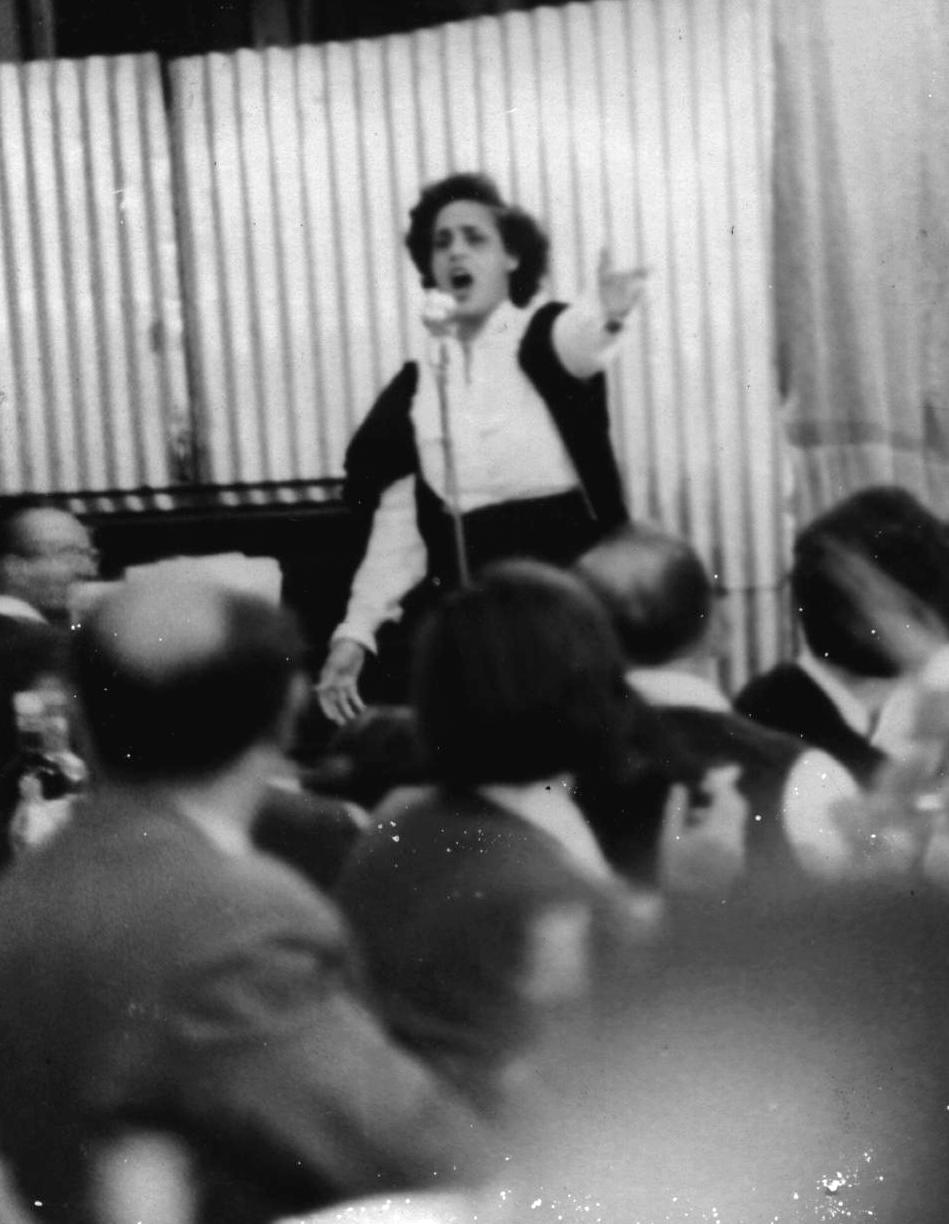
Zefira sings at a Passover seder in Gan Shmuel, 1958

Zefira estimated she had more than 400 songs in her repertoire. These included Yemenite, Bukharan, Persian, Ladino, and North African Jewish folk songs, and Arabic and Bedouin folk songs and melodies. Because she made them wider known, some ethnic melodies were later adapted into Hebrew songs.

== Musical style ==
Zefira was a contralto. She emphasized traditional Yemenite diction, enunciating both the guttural heth and ayin in every song.

Zefira was also noted for her performance style. She wore exotic, Yemenite-styled clothing and jewelry, and performed in bare feet. This costuming "evoked the myths about women of the Orient". She accentuated her performances with dramatic hand gestures. In 1949 the American-British sculptor Sir Jacob Epstein created a bronze sculpture of her hand in one of its expressive poses.

== Later life ==
Zefira's popularity in Israel waned in the 1950s, possibly because of public dissatisfaction with her choice of art music over Hebrew song. In 1959, she contended that an accident had permanently damaged her vocal cords, although she continued to perform on occasion before small audiences. In the 1960s, she studied drawing in Israel and abstract painting in Paris, and mounted a few exhibitions. She gave her last concert in the mid-1970s at the Tel Aviv Museum of Art.

Zefira published her autobiography, Kolot Rabim ("Many Voices"), in 1978. The book details "the folk songs of Oriental Jews in Israel, and songs of the Bedouin and the peasants, which had influenced the songs of the Land of Israel in the 1920s and 1930s". In 1989, Zefira released a recording of her poems.

== Awards and honors ==
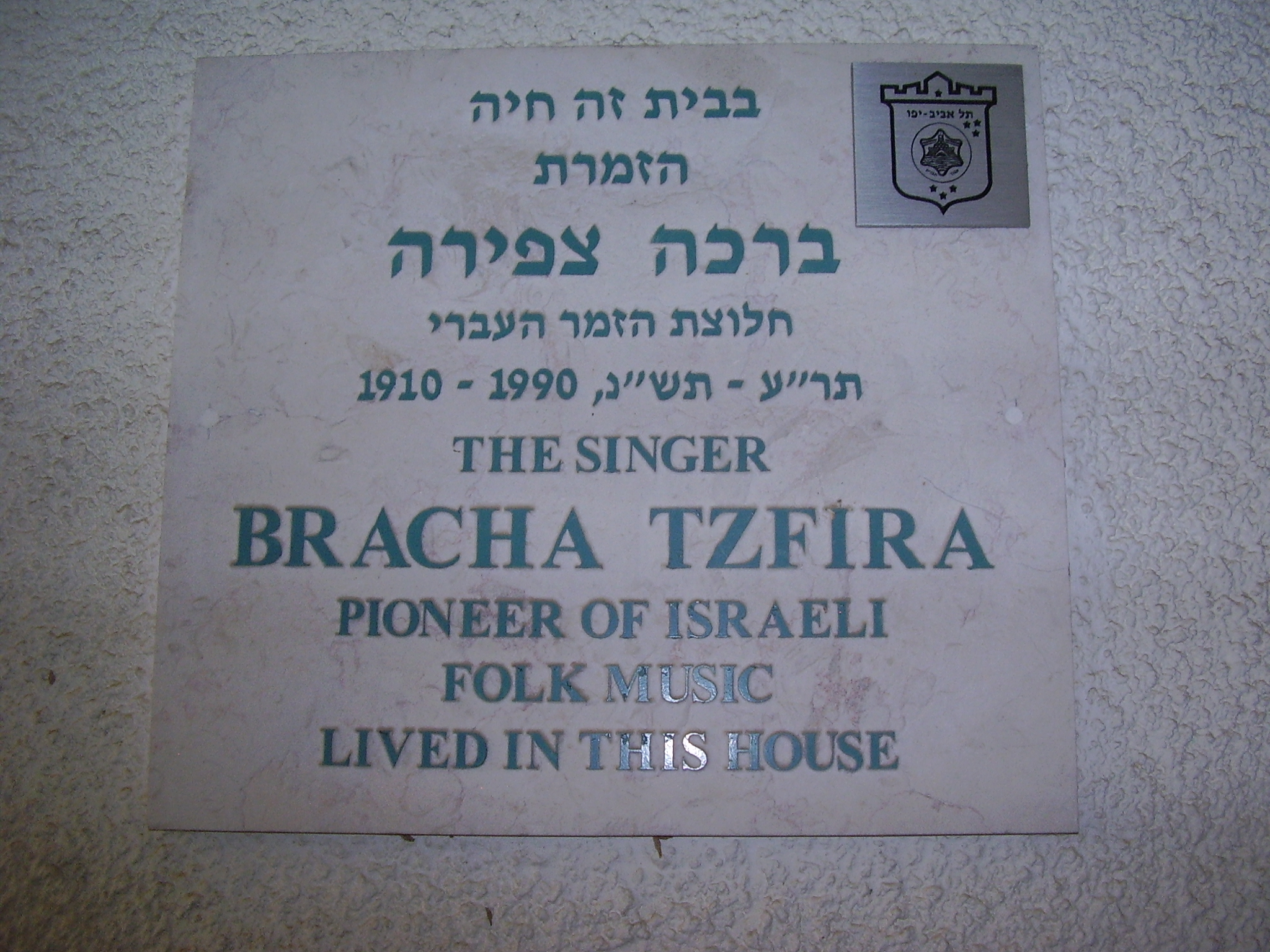
Commemorative plaque in Tel Aviv

In 1966, Zefira received the Engel Prize for introducing Eastern melodies into Israeli music, symphonies, and folk songs over a 30-year career.

The Israel Philatelic Federation issued a stamp in her honor in 2012. Streets in Jerusalem and Beersheba were named for her. The Tel Aviv municipality posted a commemorative plaque in her honor in 2008.

== Musical legacy ==
Zefira's success in blending Eastern melodies with Western harmonies influenced the later music careers of European composers who worked with her, including Nahum Nardi and Paul Ben-Haim. Other Middle Eastern Jewish singers who were inspired to study European vocal technique following Zefira's lead included Naomi Tsuri and Hana Aharoni.

== Personal life ==
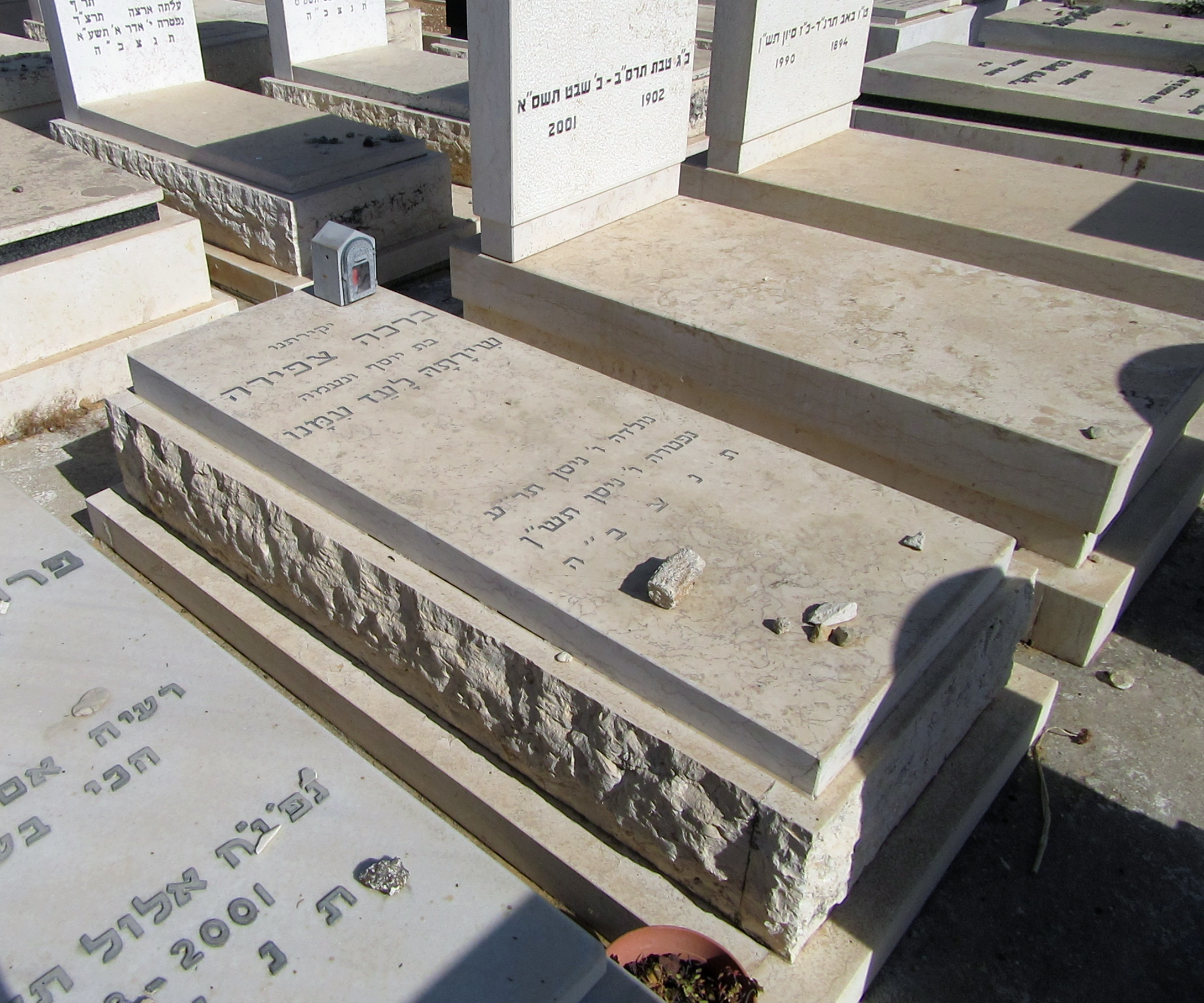
Grave of Bracha Zefira (2nd from left)

Zefira was married to her first husband, pianist Nahum Nardi (1897–1984), from 1931 to 1939. They had one daughter, Na'amah Nardi (1932–1989), who also became a singer, performing at La Scala. In 1940 Zefira married Ben-Ami Zilber, a violinist with the Palestine Symphony Orchestra; they were married until his death in 1984. Their son, Ariel Zilber (born 1943), became a popular Israeli singer-songwriter.

Zefira died on 1 April 1990 and was buried in the Kiryat Shaul Cemetery in Tel Aviv. News of her death was not broadcast in the media and her funeral was sparsely attended.

== Discography ==
Zefira's 78 rpm phonograph records were:

- "Ein Adir" (Columbia Records)
- "Ein Adir K'Adonai" (Kol Zion)
- "Eshtachave"/"Yismach Har Zion" (Reena, Tslil)
- "Hamavdil" (Reena)
- "I Have a Garden" (Columbia Records)
- "Tsuri Goali Yah/Hamavdil" (Tslil)

== Bibliography ==
- Kolot Rabim ("Many Voices: The Nobility of Obliged Belonging"), Tel Aviv, Masada, 1978

== Sources ==
- Hirschberg, Jehoash (2016), "Performers Between East and West – Ideology and Reality in the Yishuv", in Shiloah, Amnon (ed.), The Performance of Jewish and Arab Music in Israel Today, Routledge, ISBN 9781317756477
- "Bracha Zefira". Ariel (87). Ministry of Foreign Affairs: 9. 1991.
