= Yardena Alotin =

Israeli composer and pianist

Yardena Alotin ירדנה אלוטין
- Born: October 19, 1930
- Died: October 4, 1994 (aged 63)
- Occupations: Pianist, composer
- Instrument: Piano

Yardena Alotin (Hebrew: ירדנה אלוטין; October 19, 1930 in Tel Aviv – October 4, 1994 in New York City) was an Israeli composer and pianist. As a pianist and teacher, Alotin also wrote educational music and music for young musicians, such as Six Piano Pieces for Children. Alotin won the Nissimov Prize for her 1956 work, Yefei Nof.

== Biography ==
Yardena Alotin began studying piano at the age of five with Rivka Sharett-Hoz, the sister of Moshe Sharett, and the wife of Dov Hoz. Yardena Alotin studied from 1948 to 1950 at the Music Teachers' College in Tel Aviv and then from 1950 to 1952 at the Israel Music Academy. Among her teachers were Alexander Uriah Boskovich (theory), Mordecai Seter (harmony, counterpoint), Paul Ben-Haim (orchestrator), Ilona Vincze-Kraus (piano) and Ödön Pártos (composition).

Her first workYefei Nof ('Beautiful Landscape'), composed in 1952 for mixed choir, won the Nissimov Prize and was premiered by the Rinat Choir (of which she was a member) in Tel Aviv and at the Paris International Festival in 1956. Cantata for a cappella choir (1958) was performed at the Perugia Religious Music Festival in 1960. She produced both didactic and commissioned work, and rewrote Yefei Nof for solo flute (1978) for James Galway, who often performed it on tour. It is now an established piece in the international flute repertoire. In 1984, she received a commission from the Tel Aviv Foundation for Culture and Art - Shir Chag [Holiday Song] - to mark the seventy-fifth anniversary of the city of Tel Aviv. In 1975 and 1976, Alotin was the composer-in-residence at Bar-Ilan University, during which time she composed her Sonata for cello solo, and she taught piano at the Israel Conservatory of Music in Tel-Aviv. Alotin died in New York City on October 4, 1994, at 64 years old. She now rests at Yarkon Cemetery in Petah Tikva, Israel. In 1998 Alotin's husband, Yohanan Riverant, donated a fund in her name for the support of Israeli music performance.

== Music ==
Alotin wrote chamber, vocal, piano, and orchestral works. Much of her oeuvre has sacred and biblical references, and makes great use of optimistic, lyrical melodies and colorful dissonance, often influenced by Renaissance and medieval counterpoint. She often writes based on Baroque and Classical forms, with an eclectic language of Eastern, Western, and Jewish influences. Her music uses a multitude of polyphonic textures, as well as more heterophonic textures in her vocal and instrumental works. She often employs a contrapuntal use of lines that feature hemiola, cross-rhythm and phrasing, irregular phrasing and metric accents, rhythmic ostinatos, and mixed meters.

== Works ==
Selected works composed by Yardena Alotin include:

Orchestral

- Al Golah D'vuyah [A Suffering Diaspora], (text by the composer), for mezzo-soprano and orchestra, 1958
  - The Painful Exile (alternate English title)
  - Premiered by the Orchester des Hessischen Rundfunks, Frankfurt, BRD: 1987.
- Divertimento, for chamber orchestra (1992)

Vocal

- Yefeh Nof [Beautiful Landscape], (Bible: Psalm 48), SATB (1952)
- Mishirey Hanachal [Songs of the Stream], (text by L. Goldberg), for voice and piano (1954)
- Cantata, (Bible: Psalms), SATB (1956)
  - Dedicated to the memory of Leo Kestenberg, one of Alotin's teachers
- Hinneh Ma Tov [Behold, How Good], (Psalm 132), SATB (1965)
- 8 Songs for Children, (text by A. Amir), for voice and piano (1970)
- Shir Chag [Holiday Song], (Bible texts), SATB (1984)
  - Festive Song (alternate English title)
  - Commissioned for the 75th anniversary of Tel Aviv

Chamber

- Duets, for two violins (1954)
  - Primarily used for educational purposes
- Kina Fuga [Lament Fugue], for string trio (1960)
- Sonata, for violin and piano (1960)
- String Quartet (1960)
- Sonatina, for violin or flute and piano (1970)
  - Primarily used for educational purposes
- Sonata, for cello (1976)
  - This work "is full of rhythmic energy. Like the Hebrew language, it goes straight to the point. It is witty, but not without some serene and poetic moments."
- Yefeh Nof, for flute (1978)
- Trio, for violin, cello, and piano (1979)

Piano

- Passacaglia on a Bukharian Theme (1954)
  - Two sections: Prelude (Adagio molto) and Passacaglia (Allegro moderato)
- Six Piano Pieces for Children (1954) - pedagogical pieces, 8 minutes in duration
  1. An Odd Minuet (Tempo di Minuetto)
  2. Rondo in Old English Style (Andante)
  3. Courante (Allegretto - Homage a Frescobaldi)
  4. Another Odd Minuet (Tempo di Minuetto)
  5. Rondo (Andante)
  6. Capriccino (Tempo Vivo)
- Three Preludes (1958) - pedagogical pieces
  1. Vivace
  2. Adagio
  3. Allegro buffo (toccata)
- Suite (1974)
- Sonatina (1985)
