= Arie Shapira =

Israeli composer and music researcher

- אריה שפירא
- Born: 29 November 1943; Kibbutz Afikim, Israel
- Died: 3 September 2015 (aged 71)
- Education: Tel Aviv University, Rubin Academy of Music (Jerusalem)
- Occupations: Composer, music researcher
- Awards: Israel Prize (1994); Prime-Minister Grant for Composition (1986)

Arie Shapira (Hebrew: אריה שפירא; November 29, 1943 - September 3, 2015) was an Israeli composer and music researcher. He won the Israel Prize for musical composition in 1994.

== Biography ==
Arie Shapira was born on Kibbutz Afikim. As a child, he moved with his family to Petah Tikva where he began to study piano. Shapira earned a degree in philosophy from Tel Aviv University and studied composition at the Rubin Academy in Jerusalem. His teachers included Mordecai Seter, Alexander Uriah Boskovich, Abel Erlich and Andre Haidu.

== Music career ==
Shapira composed acoustic, electronic music and electro-acoustic music. He was a lecturer at Haifa University.

His style was economical and almost minimalist using a universal musical language but invested with Jewish and Israeli themes. At the same time, his compositions evoked matters of life and death in modern Israel, and his receipt of the Israel Prize was deemed political, arousing opposition.

== Awards and recognition ==
- Council for Art and Culture - Commission for writing a piano concerto (2000)
- Donaueschingen Festival - Commission for writing a string-quartet (Arditty-Quartet) (1997)
- Tel Aviv Fund for Arts - A Commission for writing a chamber composition (Miscellaneous) (1996)
- Akademie der Kunst, Berlin - A Commission for writing a piece (Letzte Briefe aus Stalingrad) (1995)
- Prime-Minister Grant for Composition (1986)

== Music for theatre and cinema ==
- Anton Chekhov, The Clerk's Death. Beer Sheva Theatre (1985)
- Hanoch Levin, Six, Rotten Hour, Beit Lessin Theater (1983)
- Leo Tolstoy, Kreuzer Sonata, Beit Lessin Theatre (1983)
- Hung On The Iron Cross, Goethe Institute, Tel Aviv (1982)
- Shmuel Yosef Agnon, Oath Of Loyalty, Acre Festival (1982)
- G. Buchner, Wozzeck, Hamadregot Theatre, Tel Aviv (1982)
- R. Forman, Pampering For The Masses, Hamadregot Theatre, Tel Aviv (1981)
- Franz Kafka, Penal Colony. Hamadregot Theatre, Tel Aviv (1980)
- H. Rechavi, No Place Under the Sun. Theatre for the Young, Tel Aviv (1977)
- Avraham Shlonsky, Micky Mau. The Kibbutz Theatre (1976)
- Kadia Molodowsky, Open the Gate. Theatre for the Young, Tel Aviv (1975)
- M. Binetzky's movie: The Sikkrikim (1971)
- N. Levitan's movie: A Woman in a Garden (1970)

== See also ==
- Music of Israel
- List of Israel Prize recipients
- Bibliography on Arie Shapira, in Ronit Seter, "Israeli Art Music", on Oxford Bibliographies (accessed 14 May 2024)
