= Kfar Gidon =

Kfar Gidon: כְּפַר גִּדְעוֹן (Hebrew)
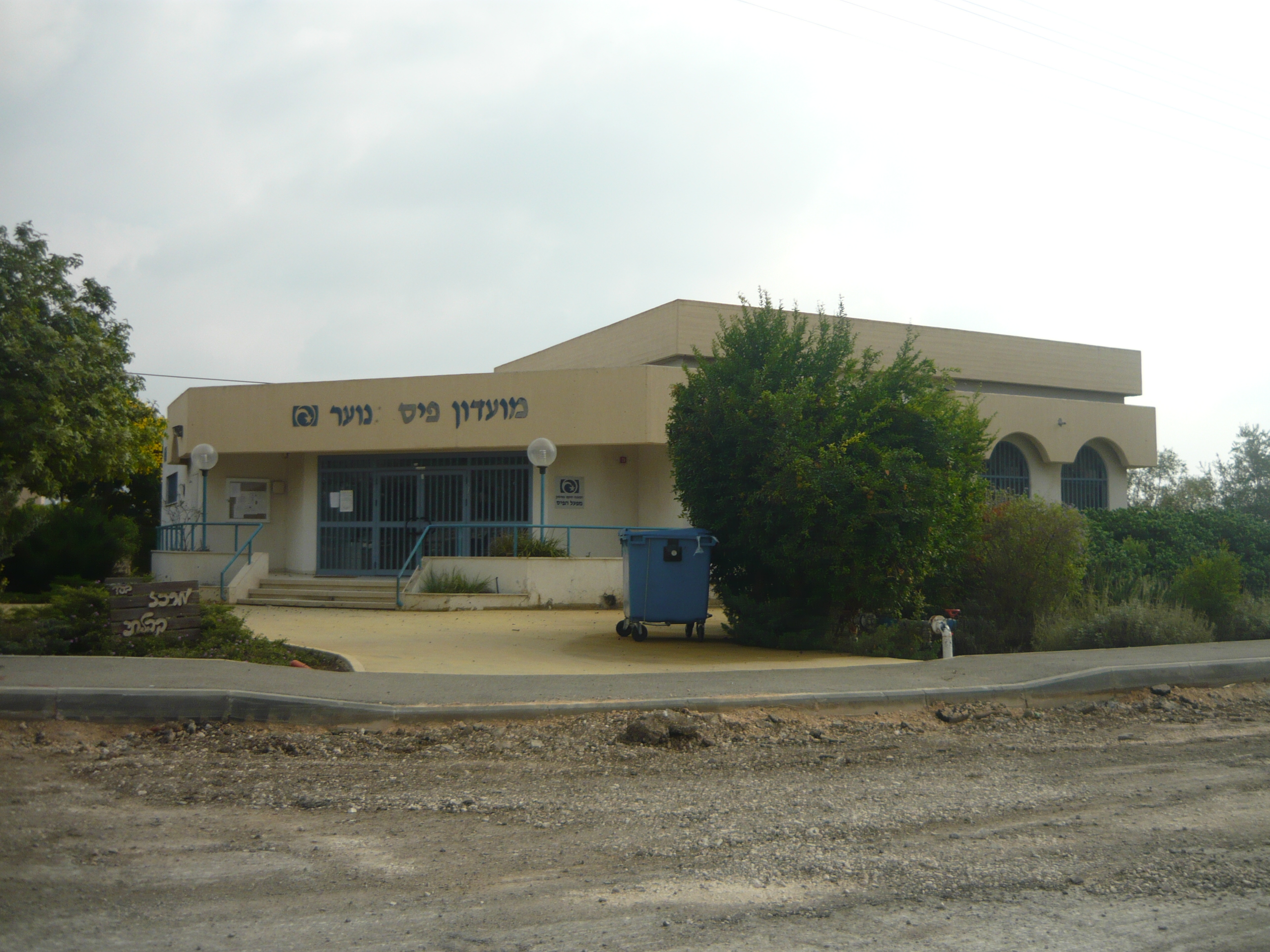
- Etymology: Gideon Village
- Location within Jezreel Valley region of Israel
- Coordinates: 32°38′36″N 35°17′28″E
- Country: Israel
- District: Northern
- Subdistrict: Jezreel
- Council: Jezreel Valley
- Founded: 1923
- Founder: Jewish Transylvanian immigrants
- Population (2024): 355

Kfar Gidon (Hebrew: כְּפַר גִּדְעוֹן, lit. 'Gideon Village') is a moshav in northern Israel. Located near Afula, it falls under the jurisdiction of Jezreel Valley Regional Council. In 2024 it had a population of 355.

== History ==
The moshav was founded in 1923 by immigrants from Transylvania who were members of Hapoel HaMizrachi, and was named after the Biblical figure of Gideon (Judges 7:1). At first the settlement was supposed to be called Moshav Transylvania and it was planned by architect Richard Kauffmann.

In 1956 it split in two co-operative societies; Kfar Gidon (Haredi) and Talmei Gidon (traditional/secular). However, as a result of reforms in the regional council, the village returned to having one administration.

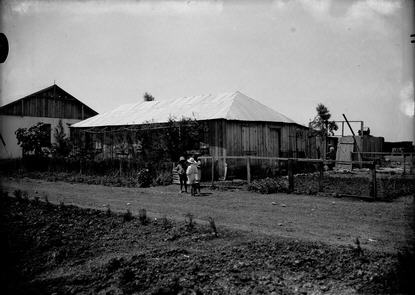
Kfar Gideon 1926

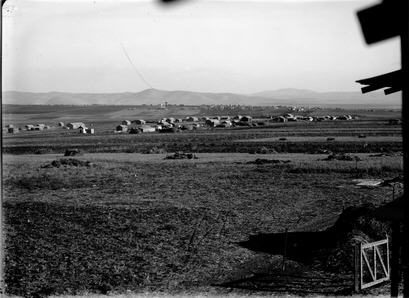
Kfar Gidom 1926

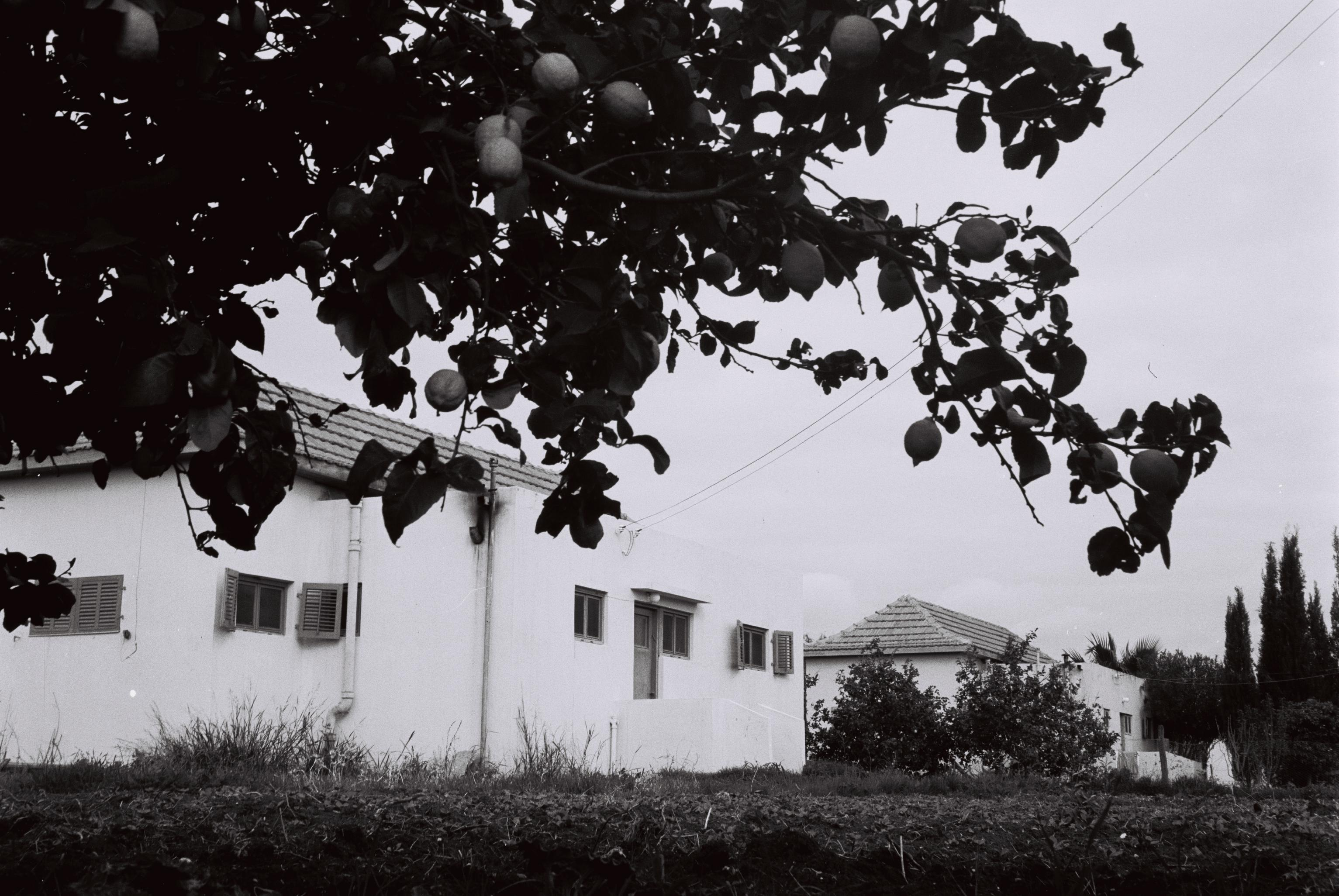
Kfar Gideon, 1946

== Notable residents ==
- Israel Amidan (1921–1968), musician and composer
