= Midnight Vigil =

Midnight Vigil (Hebrew: תיקון חצות, transliteration: tikkun ḥatzot) is an oratorio for tenor (optionally contralto in the revised 1984 version), three mixed choirs, and orchestra by Israeli composer Mordecai Seter (1916–94). The libretto is by Mordechai Tabib.

A first version was commissioned by Sara Levi-Tanai for her Inbal Dance Theater company performed in 1957. The concert oratorio version premiered on 17 July 1963 to open the third annual Israel Festival. The conductor was Gary Bertini, who conducted all performances except one until his death in 2005.

== Synopsis ==
Midnight Vigil is a roughly forty-minute monodrama, its action consisting of visions experienced by a lone worshipper who prays all night in a synagogue. The worshipper, portrayed by the tenor, has several visions over the course of the work: the Diaspora, the High Priest in the Temple, Jacob's Dream, and a Halleluja. When morning comes, the congregation enters, speaking the prayer Adonai sefatai tiftaḥ in nine-part canon. The three choirs represent, respectively, the Heavenly Voice, the Legend, and the People.

== Musical Materials ==
The oratorio's striking drama, power, and coherence derive from Seter's mastery of polyphonic technique, his sure and original orchestration, and his consistent use—with expert balance between repetition and variation—of an intricately linked network of musical materials. These include (1) a "lament" motive, consisting of a descending minor second; (2) a "hope" motive, consisting of an ascending major second; (3) a twelve-note scale consisting exclusively of half-steps and augmented seconds; and (4) the Yemenite paraliturgical melodies Ahavat hadasa and Elohim esh 'ala.

== Earlier versions ==
Seter worked on Midnight Vigil from 1956 through 1961, and made small revisions even later, in 1978 and 1984, on the occasion of specific performances. Before the oratorio version's 1963 premiere, four preliminary versions were performed. The first, in 1957, was danced by the Inbal company. This ten- to twelve-minute work was scored for baritone soloist and a small chamber ensemble, with two-part chorus sections to be sung by the dancers. Seter next produced a second version, "Rhapsody on Yemenite Themes" for symphony orchestra, completed in 1958, for orchestra alone (14 minutes long), followed by a third, a "Rhapsody on Yemenite Themes"for soloists, choir and symphony orchestra, in 1959. The work's fourth version, a radiophonic oratorio (1960) was similar to the fifth and final one, 30 minutes in length and scored for baritone, narrator, three choirs, and orchestra. A twist, however, is that radiophonic effects applied to the choirs in post-production rendered this version of Midnight Vigil a recording-only experience. This version won the Prix Italia for a radiophonic work in 1962; it had been prepared for just this competition. The radiophonic version further occasioned the first stereophonic radio broadcast in Israel. It was aired on two different channels simultaneously, and listeners tuned in on two receivers for the full effect.

== Reception ==
Midnight Vigil is regarded as one of the most important Israeli works, and was paired with Beethoven's Ninth Symphony on the Israel Philharmonic Orchestra's Millennium Festival program of 1 January 2000.
