= Nahum Nardi =

Israeli composer

Nahum Nardi (Hebrew: נחום נרדי; 1901 in Kiev – 1977) was a Russian Empire-born Israeli composer.

== Biography ==
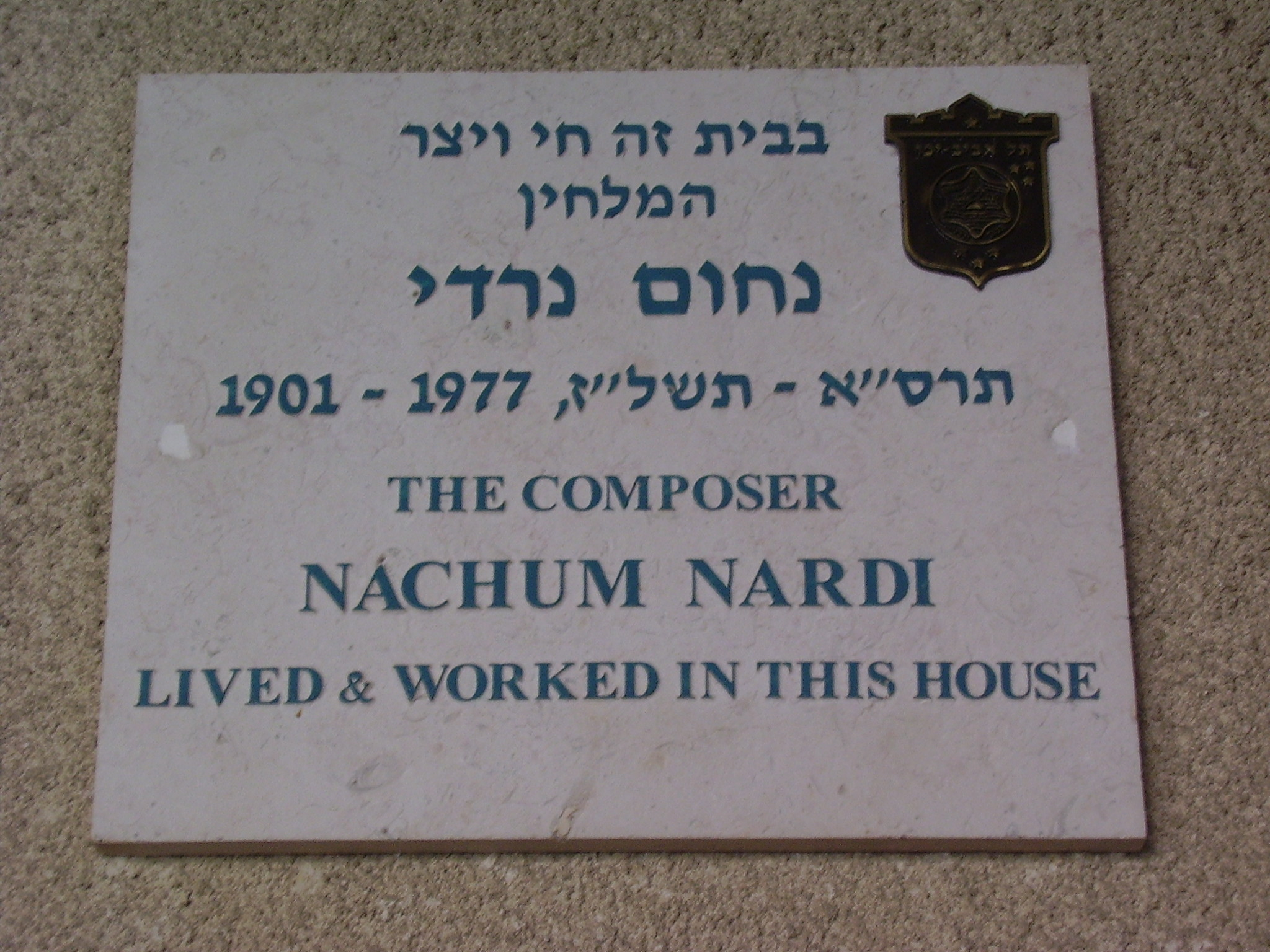
Nahum Nardi memorial plaque, Tel Aviv

Nahum Nardi won a scholarship to study at the Kiev Conservatory and graduated with honors in 1915. Researcher of Hebrew song Eliyahu Hacohen records that Nardi came first in the musical contest at the end of his studies, second place going to Vladimir Horowitz.

Due to the Petliura riots in 1919, he left for Warsaw, where he lived for two years, and then moved to Vienna, where he graduated from the Vienna Academy of Music in 1922.

In 1923 Nardi immigrated to Mandate Palestine. He was the husband and accompanist of Yemenite Jewish singer Bracha Zefira, to whom he was married from 1931 to 1939. Their daughter, Na'amah Nardi, also became a singer and performed at La Scala.
