= Symphony No. 1 (Ben-Haim) =

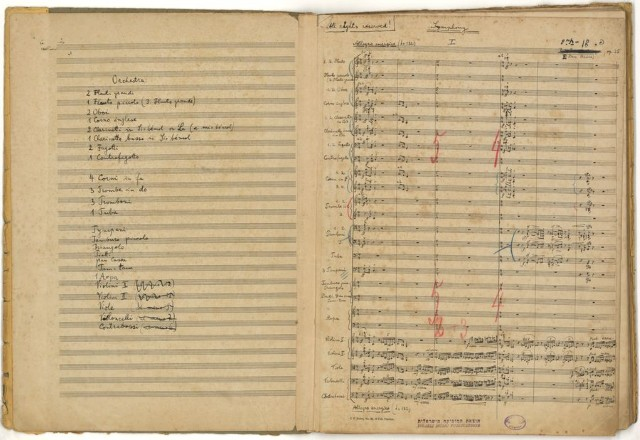
Symphony no. 1, manuscript from 1940, first page

Israeli composer Paul Ben-Haim's Symphony no. 1 is the first Eretz-Israel symphony and one of the most important works in the history of classical music in Israel.
