= Hanoch Jacoby =

Israeli composer

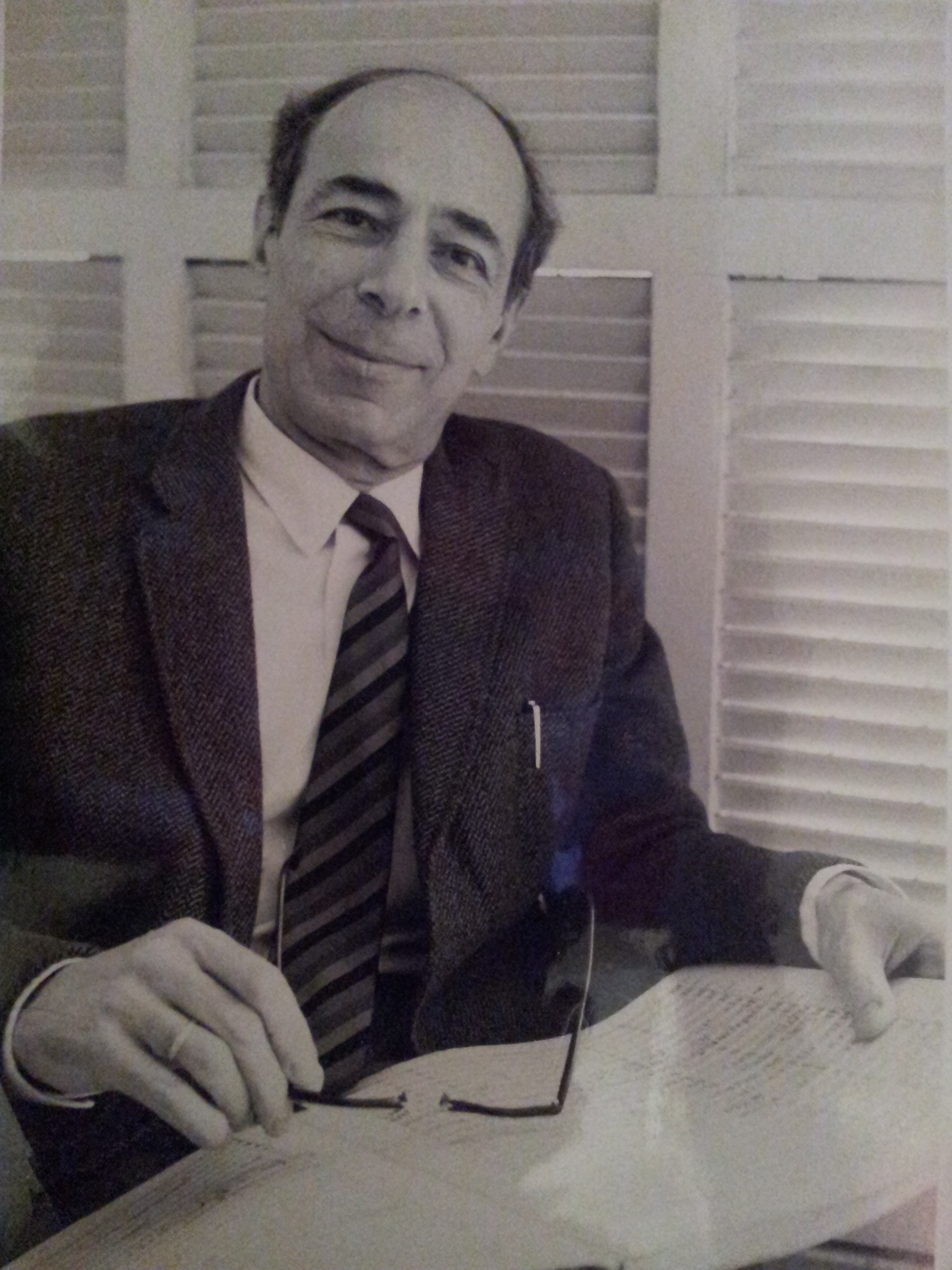
Hanoch (Heinrich) Jacoby, 1970

Hanoch (Heinrich) Jacoby (Hebrew: חנוך יעקובי; March 2, 1909 – 13 December 1990) was an Israeli composer and viola player.

== Biography ==
Hanoch Heinrich Jacoby was born on March 2, 1909, in Königsberg, Germany (now Kaliningrad, Russia). There he learned to play the viola. From 1927 until 1930 he studied in the Royal Academy of Musical Performing Art (now the Berlin University of the Arts). His composition and viola teacher there was Paul Hindemith. He played in Michael Taube's chamber orchestra in Berlin and from 1930 in the Frankfurt Radio Symphony Orchestra. In 1933 he was fired due to the Nuremberg Laws.

In 1934 he immigrated to Palestine as part of the Fifth Aliyah as a viola player in the Jerusalem string quartet formed in Jerusalem by Emil Hauser. He was one of the founders of a conservatory that later became the Jerusalem Academy of Music and Dance. He taught violin, viola, music theory, and composition there, and was also its head from 1954 until 1958. During the same years he was also first viola player in the Jerusalem Symphony Orchestra and often conducted it.

Since 1958 he played the viola in Israel Philharmonic Orchestra, which also performed his compositions, until his retirement in 1974. That year he was resident artist of the Technion in Haifa. After he retired, he continued to teach, play and direct various chamber ensembles.

He died in Tel Aviv on December 13, 1990.

Jacoby was married to Alice Jacoby (née Kennel), and had four children: Hava Nir (deceased), Ilana Yaari, Rafi Jacoby, Michal Preminger (married to Prof. Aner Preminger). Among his 9 grandchildren (2012) - the musician Nori Jacoby and the dancer and choreographer Nima Jacoby.

== His work ==
All Jacoby's compositions except one string concerto were written in Israel.

Jacoby arranged many songs for Bracha Zefira, one of the pioneer female singers and songwriters of modern Israeli music, both songs written by herself and song she collected from others. These songs had a varied arrangements, from a classical chamber ensemble to a trumpet-only accompaniment. In the collection "Songs With Piano Accompaniment" (שירים בליווי פסנתר) he applied Gregorian modes to Israeli folk music. He wrote the cantata "A Day Will Come" (עוד יבוא יום) to a poem by the Labor Zionist ideologue A. D. Gordon. In 1946 he rewrote it as a string suite, which he later again reworked for a whole orchestra. For this suite, titled "The Tiny Suite", he received the Engel award in 1952.

Yaakobi wrote three symphonies, in 1944, 1955 and 1960. The first one was first performed by the Israel Philharmonic Orchestra conducted by Yaakobi himself in 1946. The second was first performed in Vienna and conducted by Heinz Freudenthal. In 1948 the Jerusalem Symphony Orchestra performed his overture based on the melody of the traditional Hanukkah song Ma'oz Tzur.

He felt alienated from the developments in music of his time, and in the description to his work composition Serio giocoso he wrote that he felt it important to write simple human music at a time when much of new music was too improvised, too intellectual or too electronic.

In 1975, as a resident artist in the Technion, he wrote Mutatio, a piece based on the traditional Rosh Hashanah chants of Kurdish and Iraqi Jews.

== Bibliography ==
- Yehuda Cohen, Neimei Zemirot Yisrael: Musicians and Music in Israel, Tel Aviv, Am Oved, 1990, p. 130-32.
