= Israel Sharon =

Israel Sharon (Hebrew: ישראל שרון; born in Tel Aviv, 25 May 1966) is an Israeli composer, pianist, arranger, conductor and a teacher in Israel Arts and Science Academy.

As a young man Israel Sharon studied piano with Alexander Volkov and composition with Abel Ehrlich. Later, he studied at the Buchmann-Mehta School of Music in Tel Aviv, where he continued his composition studies with Leon Schidlowsky. Israel Sharon also studied at Rice University in Houston, Texas.

Since 1992 he has been a leading member of the Israeli Kaprizma Ensemble as a composer, conductor and pianist. He has composed numerous works for the ensemble many of which were also recorded by the ensemble.

He has done arrangements of other compositions including one of Maurice Ravel's Daphnis and Chloe for 16 instruments.

His works have been performed by Kaprizma as well as by leading international artists such as Pierre Strauch, Alain Damiens, Julius Berger, Wolfgang Meyer, Cihat Askin, Sava Stoianov and members of the Chamber Music Society of Lincoln Center to name but few. His composition were presented concerts and festivals in many countries including Germany, Austria, Russia, South Korea, USA, Cyprus, Hungary and Israel.

== Compositions ==
=== compositions for solo instruments ===
- Seven Movements for solo guitar, composed for Hanan Feinstein, 1994
- Variations on a Spanish Folksong, for viola or violin solo, 2007
- Desert Music III - Five Etudes for Guitar (2007)

=== Chamber music ===
- Duo for Trumpet and Cello recorded by Sava Stoianov, 2007
- Duo for Trumpet and Cello
- Duo for Bassoon and Horn (1995)
- Duo for Violin and Viola
- Duo for Viola and Guitar
- Sonata for Violin and Piano (1995)
- Sonata for cello and Piano
- Divertimento for Horn, Viola and Guitar (1996)
- Trio for Clarinet, Guitar and Triangles (1993)
- Trio for Flute, Clarinet and Guitar
- Desert Music - Four pieces for Viola, Guitar and Percussion
- Quartet - for two Percussionists and two Basses
- Violin Sonata - for Violin, Piano, Harpsichord and Celesta (one player), with Viola and Horn obbligati
- Sonata for Viola and Piano with Clarinet, Guitar and Percussion obbligato

=== Chamber music with voice ===
- Four Songs by Lorca (Spanish) for female voice, bassoon, guitar, cello
- Three Songs by Lorca (Spanish) for voice, 2 guitars, percussion

=== Large Ensembles ===
- Four Bagatellesfor two Celli and ensemble composed for Julius Berger and Kaprizma
- Instrumental Cantata for Flute, Oboe, Clarinet, Bassoon, Horn, Trombone, Piano, Viola and Cello
- The Concert in the egg - two movement after Hieronymus Bosch for Clarinet, Horn, Guitar, Viola and Cello
- The Raise in the Salary after George Perec for Clarinet, Guitar, Piano and String Trio
- Three Preludes and Fugues for 2 violins, viola and 2 Celli

=== Opera ===
- The Bald Soprano, a chamber opera based on a play by Eugène Ionesco, 2009

premiered at the Jerusalem Music Centre - December 24, 2009

=== Orchestral ===
- Passacaglia and Allegro (2008) for youth string orchestra
- Variations on a theme by Satie for piano and chamber orchestra

== Educational activities ==
Israel Sharon is a faculty member of the Israel Arts and Science Academy and of the Buchman Mehta School of Music in Tel Aviv. In the last five years he has also been leading in Israel a pioneering program of composition studies for young musicians within the frameworks of the Israeli Center for Excellence Through Education.

== Awards ==
In 2002 Israel Sharon was awarded the Israeli Prime Minister Composition award.

== Recordings ==
Many of Israel Sharon's works has been recorded by the Kaprizma Ensemble and are available for free listening and downloading at the ensemble's website.
