= Yair Kless =

Israeli violinist and professor (born 1940)

Yair Kless (Hebrew: יאיר קלס; born November 12, 1940) is an Israeli violinist and professor.

== Background ==
Kless began performing at an early age, attaining a world-wide reputation in his activities like soloist and chamber musician. His repertoire includes works from baroque period to compositions specially created for him.

He studied with Israel Amidan and André Gertler at the Academy of Music in Tel-Aviv, and later at the Conservatory and the Queen Elizabeth Music Chapel in Brussels.

Kless belonged to the Baroque Musicians Israeli Group, and he was the first violin in the Sol-La-Re string quartet, the Tel Aviv piano quartet and the American New Art Trio. He is currently a member of the Modus Trio, a string trio in Israel. Yair has performed the majority of the sonata repertoire, collaborating with outstanding musical partners such as Nadia Reisenberg, Pnina Salzman, Shoshana Rudiakov, Arie Vardi, Victor Derevianko and Frank Wibout. Kless often collaborates with his son, also an accomplished violinist and pedagogue, Eyal Kless.

For many years, he has been in charge of the String Department at the Rubin Academy of Music, which he directed between 1989 and 1993. His pupils include Vadim Gluzman.

Kless has served as a jury member of several international competitions. He regularly takes part in summer courses and prestigious music festivals, such as the Salzburg Festival and Bravo! Institute. He is also a guest professor in master classes in the United States, the former Soviet Union, Germany, Ireland, Finland, France, Australia, England, Italy, Poland and the Netherlands. Since 1995, Kless has divided his time between Europe - as professor at the University of Music and Performing Arts Graz (Austria) - and Israel.
