= Marc Lavry =

Israeli musician

- מרק לברי
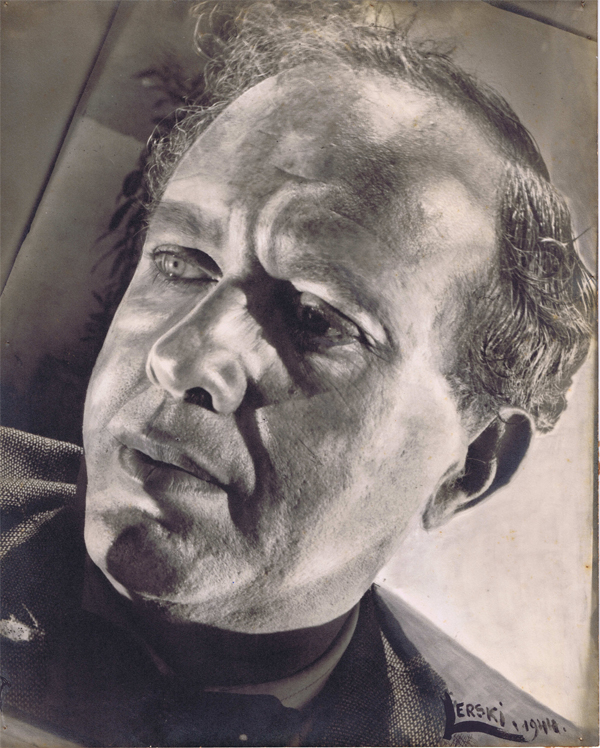
- Born: December 22, 1903
- Died: March 24, 1967 (aged 63)
- Occupations: composer and conductor
- Known for: "Mediterranean School" of composition

Marc Lavry (Hebrew: מרק לברי; December 22, 1903, Riga – March 24, 1967, Haifa) was an Israeli composer and conductor. Born in Latvia and trained in Germany, Lavry immigrated to Palestine in 1936, where he was instrumental in developing the "Mediterranean School" of composition, that merged elements of oriental Jewish and Arab music with modern European classical music.

== Biography ==
Lavry was born Mark Levin in Riga, Latvia on December 22, 1903. As a child, he studied piano at the Riga Conservatory of Music, where he also began composing. After graduating high school, he moved to Germany, where he earned a degree in architecture, and continued his music studies at the Leipzig Conservatory. He studied piano with Professor Robert Teichmüller, and composition with Paul Graener, and later with Alexander Glazunov. After discovering there already was an older, then more established composer and conductor named Mark Levin, he decided to change his own name to Marc Lavry.

He began his conducting career as music director of the opera house in Saarbrücken, and later, of the Tanzbühne Laban, the dance theater directed by modern dance pioneer Rudolf von Laban. In 1929, he became conductor of the Berlin Symphony Orchestra (not the more famous Berlin Philharmonic). In 1933, the Nazis, who had assumed power in Germany, disbanded the orchestra. Lavry returned to Riga, where he became resident conductor of the Riga Opera. However, as antisemitism intensified in Latvia as well, Lavry and his wife decided to emigrate to Palestine in 1935.

Lavry felt a strong connection with the emerging Jewish state. "I immigrated to Israel in 1935 and immediately felt that I found my spiritual homeland", he wrote in his autobiography. "Nowhere until arriving to Israel, did I feel that grounded. I felt that I landed where I belong and that I found a place worth fighting for. I felt that the country inspired me as a composer and that here I wrote my best compositions." He became resident composer of the Ohel Theater in Tel Aviv in 1941, and also served as conductor of the Palestine Folk Opera. There he composed the first Hebrew-language opera "Dan the Guard".

In 1948 he moved to Jerusalem to undertake the creation of the Kol Zion Lagola radio station. There, he founded the first professional choir in Israel, and was instrumental in the development of Israeli music. The musicologist Ronit Seter estimates that during the 1950s and 1960s, his music was performed more frequently in Israel than that of any his compatriots.

In 1963, at the invitation of Haifa mayor Abba Hushi, Lavry moved to Haifa to conduct the Haifa symphony. He remained there until his death in 1967. He was survived by three children.

== Music ==
While still in Berlin, Lavry showed an interest in Jewish music. There he wrote the Jewish Suite for string quartet (Op. 17), Hassidic Dance (Op. 22) for orchestra, and Ahasver, the Wandering Jew for orchestra (Op. 23).

In Palestine, Lavry joined a group of leading composers, many of whom had, like him, escaped from Nazi persecution, including Alexander Uriah Boskovich, Paul Ben-Haim, Ödön Pártos, and others. These composers were actively seeking to create a new, national form of music for the emerging Jewish state. This new style, dubbed "the Mediterranean School" by Boskovich, incorporated elements of Middle-eastern music, including melisma, homophony, and use of unconventional musical modes.

Lavry found himself swept up by this musical tide. "I never attempted consciously to compose in the Israeli style," he wrote in his autobiography. "I didn’t try, upon arriving in Israel, to impose upon myself a specific conception. Yet, as soon as I became encompassed with the influence of the country, when I found myself to be an integral part of Israel, when I mastered the Hebrew language — in the most natural way — I began composing in that style which I write till today."

Many of Lavry's songs have entered the canonical body of Israeli folk music called "Land of Israel songs" ("Shirey Eretz Yisrael"), including Emek, Kaha Merakdim, Kumi Tsi Achoti Kala, and more. But Lavry never saw himself as a writer of popular music, and his oeuvre reflects a merger of traditional folk and classical styles. Immediately after composing the song Emek, for example, he produced the symphonic tone poem Emek using the same melody. His opera, Dan the Guard (Dan HaShomer), is another example. Lavry uses different musical styles to depict different ethnic types - "the augmented second for the old Polish Jews... a horra dance in parallel fifths for the festive event of the communal laundry...[and] operatic cliches, mostly derived from Puccini..." wrote Jehoash Hirshberg, a historian of Israeli music

Together with choreographer Gertrud Kraus, Lavry developed the art of dance and Israel ballet. The oratorio "Song of Songs" (Hebrew: שיר השירים, shir ha-shirim) has been performed many times and Lavry's choral music and arias have become part of the repertoire of choirs and singers in Israel and abroad.

== See also ==
- List of Israeli classical composers
- Music of Israel
- Dance of Israel
