= Netta Aloni =

Contemporary Israeli composer (born 1945)

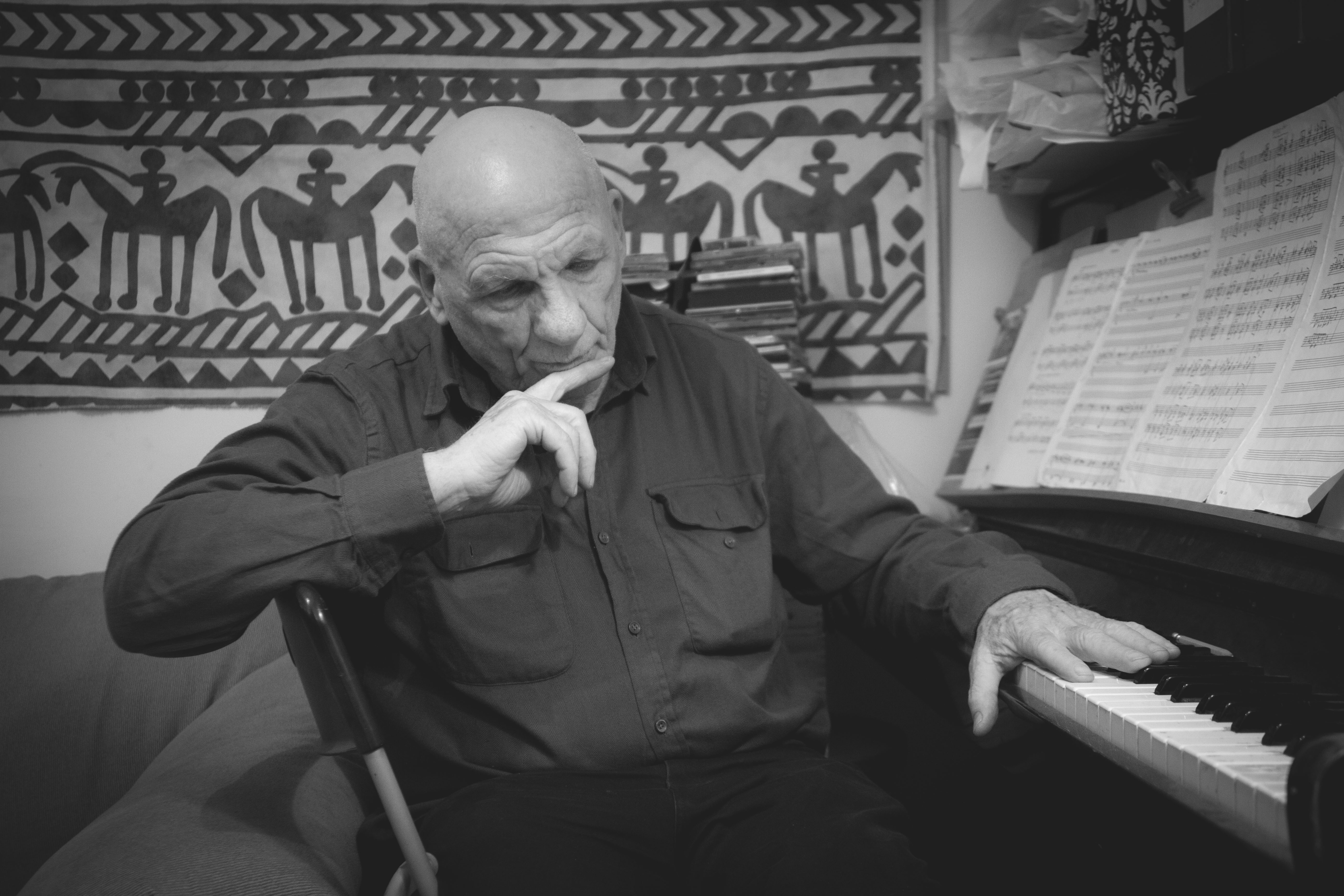
Netta Aloni, 2012

Netta Aloni (Hebrew: נטע אלוני; born 1945) is a contemporary Israeli composer who composes for vocal and instrumental ensembles. He has written chamber, choral and instrumental works for both solo and group performers.

== Formal education ==
Aloni studied musical composition with the Israeli composer Andre Hajdu, and continued his studies with Reuven Sarrousy, Betty Oliviero and Gideon Levinson, also Israeli composers. He took supplementary courses in composition during 2005-2007 at the Bar-Ilan University, Israel.

== Performances and awards ==
Aloni's work is performed in Israel and abroad. His compositions were recorded by the Israeli Broadcasting Authority and were broadcast over the radio, on the Voice of Music station in Israel, which is devoted to broadcasting both classic and contemporary classical music by foreign and Israeli composers. His work I Have Told Myself Completely was chosen to represent the Israel Broadcasting Authority in the International Rostrum of Composers. He is one of six recipients of the 2013 Composition by Classical Composers Award sponsored by the Ministry of Culture and Sport and given by the Israeli Prime Minister.

== Published work ==
Four full-length CDs of Netta Aloni compositions have been published:

- Moments with Myself (1996), with compositions for piano and flute performed by Israelis Ora Rotem-Nelken and Edith Shemer on the respective instruments
- Five Vocal Pieces(2000), with pieces sung by Mira Zakai accompanied by Rotem-Nelken, and pieces for voice and instrumental ensemble sung by Esti Keinan and Avital Raz
- Breathless (2007), pieces composed exclusively for the bayan
- The Empty Rooms (2012), a double album collecting his compositions from the years 1999-2012, including
  - a string quintet
  - two song cycles for voice and piano
  - chamber compositions for violin and piano, cello and bayan, and solo pieces.

The works were recorded at the Jerusalem Music Center in Mishkenot Sha'ananim during the year 2012.

- The Day After (2017), a double album collecting compositions from the years 2014-2017, including
  - two pieces for choir
  - pieces for solo piano
  - a wind quintet
  - pieces for cello, contrabass and bayan
  - two song cycles for voice, piano and bayan

The works were recorded at the Tel-Aviv conservatory during the year 2017.

== Personal ==
Aloni lives with his family in Jerusalem, and he is also a practicing psychoanalyst.
