= Emanuel Amiran-Pougatchov =

Israeli composer

Emanuel Amiran-Pougatchov (Hebrew: עמנואל עמירן-פוגצ'וב; born Emanuel Pugaczow; 8 August 1909 – 18 December 1993) was a composer and teacher.

== Biographical information ==
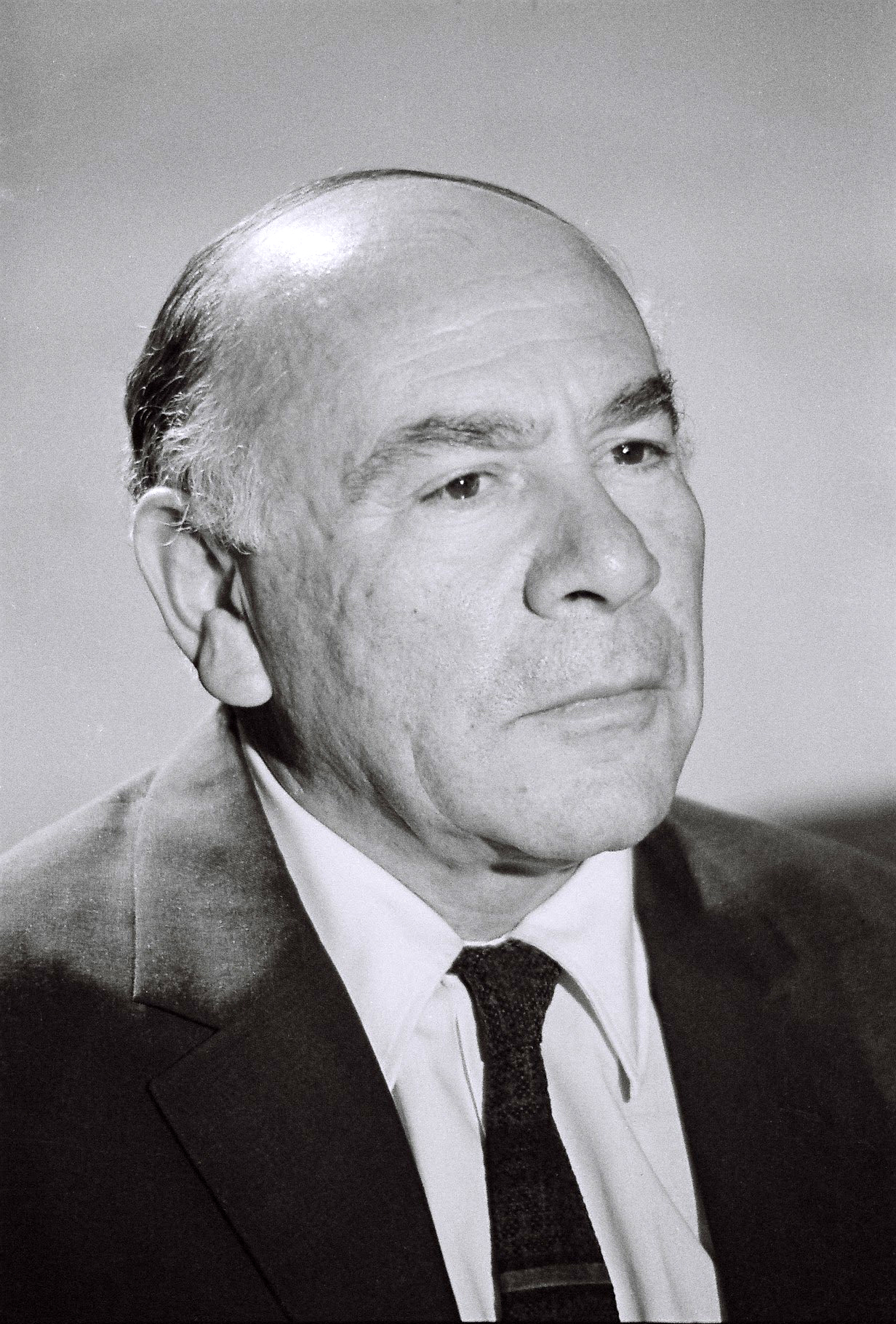
Emanuel Amiran Pugaczow

In Warsaw, Emanuel Pugaczow began his musical studies at the age of 10 years with Joseph Engel, Professor David Shore and Engel Weinberg. He later continued his musical studies for a period of three years within Berlin. From 1928 to 1930, he studied with Solomon Rosowsky within Jerusalem.

His studies of music (combined with pedagogy) continued from 1934 onward at the Trinity College of Music in Britain with Sir Granville Bantock and Alex Rowley. He returned to Israel again in 1936 again to be involved in teaching activities, at some time founding with Prof. Leo Kestenberg the Music Teachers' Seminary in Tel Aviv, both continuing as primary authorities and charges of. In 1948 he was officer in charge of military music, establishing a joint initiative with artillery commander, Samuel Edmond. Together with Captain Jacob Pleasant he founded an Israeli Army Band. The military band they formed was one of the foundations for the establishment of the Israel Defense Forces Orchestra, together with an orchestra of Alexandria, under the baton of' Otto Gronich.

He was the first appointed Inspector of Music (Minister for Music Education) at the time of the establishment of the nation of Israel, this from 1948 to his retirement in 1975.

He was best known for his holiday songs, although his repertoire also included symphonic music for orchestra and choir, music for the theater as well as over 600 folk-songs. Amiran is credited with composing the music to "Mayim Mayim", one of the most popular Israeli folk dance songs.

== See also ==
- List of Israeli classical composers
- Secular Jewish music
- Contemporary Jewish religious music
