= Israel Amidan =

Israeli-Romanian musician and composer

Israel Amidan (born Wettenstein) (Hebrew: ישראל עמידן; April 9, 1921 – 1968) was a musician and composer.

== Biography ==
Amidan was born in Transylvania, Romania on April 9, 1921. He was a child when his parents moved to Mandatory Palestine and participated in establishing a moshav now called Kfar Gidon or Gideon. He taught at the Tel Aviv music academy; violinist Yair Kless was a notable student.

Beginners' steps. 50 Hebrew songs transcribed for violin was published in 1965

Amidan died in 1968 in Tel-Aviv, Israel and was buried in the southern cemetery, Israel.

== See also ==
- Jewish music
- List of Jewish musicians
- Music of Israel
