= Richard Farber =

American classical composer

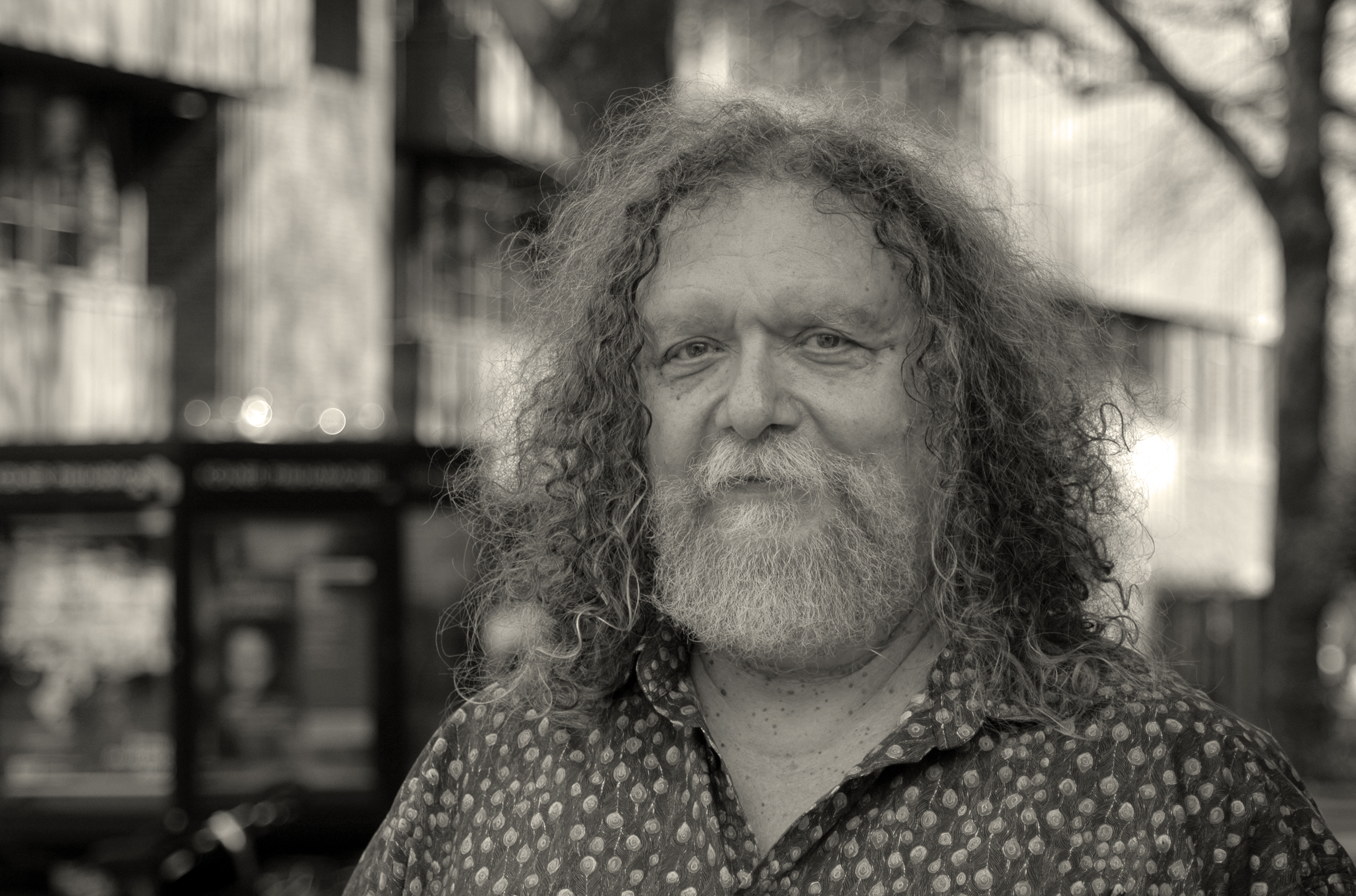
Image of Richard Farber

Richard Michael Farber (born December 4, 1945) is an American-born Israeli composer and librettist whose career spans over more than four decades. Farber began his work as a theater and ballet composer from which he moved to large scale stage works and, recently, orchestral and vocal music; to date, Farber has penned eight operas, three of which had been premiered on stage and four on the radio in Germany (see below). Farber is the 2005 recipient of the Composers’ Prime Minister Award.

== Early years ==
Born in Washington D.C. to an American father and a holocaust survivor mother who arrived in the US from Galicia in 1929, Farber’s first seven years of school at the Hebrew Academy of Washington (now called the Melvin J. Berman Hebrew Academy) were extremely difficult, as undiagnosed dyslexia prevented him from dealing with the two alphabets simultaneously. A self-taught clarinet player, Farber was asked to play the contrabass upon entering the public school system at 14. A single lesson from the orchestra’s conductor sufficed for Farber to continue on his own and play the bass in his high school big-band, and bass clarinet and contrabass in its orchestra. Having borrowed instruments from the school’s band, Farber taught himself saxophone, baritone horn, and other instruments. At 14 he also wrote his first compositions—more than a dozen songs in the style of folk songs (text and music now lost).

Having been active in Habonim youth movement (1959–1963), Farber attended their summer camp and became an instructor at the Washington D.C. branch. Influenced by the movement’s Zionist messages, Farber immigrated to Israel at the age of 19 he enrolled at the Hebrew University of Jerusalem in 1964, and a year later in the Music Theory Department at the Rubin Academy of Music and Dance in Jerusalem, from which he graduated in 1969. Among his teachers at the Rubin Academy were Yitzhak Sadai, Noam Sheriff, Haim Alexander, Edith Gerson-Kiwi and Yosef Tal.

== Professional work and later years ==
While a student, Farber wrote incidental music for drama and ballet productions at the Hebrew University of Jerusalem. Professional commissions soon followed from the Jerusalem Khan Theater, and later, in the 70s and 80s, led to commissions from most of the professional theaters and ballet companies in the country (among them the Beer Sheva Theater, the Haifa Municipal Theater, the kibbutz stage, the Acco Festival of Alternative Israeli Theatre, Habima, the Batsheva Dance Company, and the Inbal Dance Theater; information on Farber’s incidental music is available at the Theater Archives of the Tel Aviv University). Farber’s first full-length ballet, 5 1/2 (German title Mann im Schatten), was set to his own libretto and choreographed by Renato Zanella; it premiered by the Stuttgart Ballet in 1992

During his compulsory military service in Israel, Farber’s had served as a gunner and was assigned as a medic after the Yom Kippur War (1973)—a duty he had held as a reserve soldier until 1994. Between 1969 and 1975 Farber had taught theatre music at Tel Aviv University, and has worked since 1970 as a freelance composer and director of radio drama at Kol Yisrael (the Israel Broadcasting Authority). Beginning to write radio plays in 1974 Farber has directed more than a hundred radio plays and operas for Kol Yisrael, Galei Tzahal (the IDF Radio Station) and European radio stations in Austria, Germany, Belgium, and the Netherlands. Additional plays were produced for France Culture. Farber is the librettist and composer of eight operas and music theater works for the radio in Austria and Germany. The first were Boris und Edna: Das Komödien-Team (Westdeutscher Rundfunk, WDR 1982), Spot(t)-Operetten (Bayerischer Rundfunk, 1982), Spielzeugoperetten (Bayerischer Rundfunk, 1984) and Vier Todesträume (Österreichischer Rundfunk, 1986). Thirty Seven Depression Miniatures, a music theater piece was produced by the WDR in 2005. Farber’s Mission Argo (1999), which he also directed, was the first surround sound production produced at the WDR in 2000. Dracula and the Nerd in Aetherspace, a Neo-Gothic Melodrama (2013) is scheduled for production in surround sound at the WDR in 2014. One of Farber's works for radio is Begegnungen mit rothaarige Frauen, a four-hour radio novel based on a book of his of the same name.

The Quest to Polyphonia (German title, Wer weiss wo Polphonia liegt?), Farber’s first stage opera, was commissioned by Stuttgart Opera in 1989. Taking place in a post-atomic-war world, the opera is a legend folded within another: journeying through the history of western art music, Farber anthropomorphizes familiar melodic and harmonic features into evil creatures (like the hypnotizing “Evil Drone,” or Brothers Parallismus and Quintus who sing in parallel fifths) that try to prevent the protagonist, Prince Johann von Buxtehude, from getting to the Cave of Time. Upon defeating all the evil creatures, Prince Johann finds the time capsule and brings back art music. An ironic commentary on compositional teaching, The Quest to Polyphonia finds its composer indulging in violating these pedagogical conventions. A second, Hebrew production, of The Quest to Polyphonia took place in 1995 by the New Israel Opera in Tel Aviv.

Additional stage works include: Dracula oder Die Gefesselte Ballerina (Kaiserslautern, 1993), The Eternal Triangle Trio (Cologne Opera and the Vienna Opern Theater, both 1996), and Operation Mitternacht (Bonn Opera, 2002).

In 1998 Farber turned to concert art music; the classical music department of the WDR led by Werner Wittersheim has been a major supporter of this endeavor. Farber’s first symphony Dichotomy (1998–2003), drawing on Jazz idioms and sonic imageries reminiscent of children’s toys, was recorded live in concert at the WDR in 2005. His Passacaglia for Orchestra (1993; revised 2008) and Concerto Grosso for Percussion, Actors, and Orchestra (2008) followed and were premiered by the Duisburg Philharmonic in 2008. Farber’s recent project features the setting of Heinrich Heine’s Verschiedene for baritone and piano (total of 75 poems in 13 cycles), of which three were recorded by the WDR in 2010 (In der Fremde, Seraphine, and Yolante und Marie). The remaining cycles (Angélique, Clarisse, Der Tannhäuser, Diana, Emma, Friedrike, Hortense, Katharina, Schöpfungslieder, and Tragödie) have been recorded in 2013, again by the WDR.

== Hobbies ==
Farber is a collector of textiles and embroideries in particular. Pieces from his collection have been shown at the Deutsche Textilmuseum in Krefeld (Oriental Textiles, A Composer's Collection, 1996), the Islamic Museum, Jerusalem (Suzani, 2001) and at the Eretz Israel Museum in Tel Aviv (Shimmering Gold, 2007). He has also written about his hobby.

== Selected works ==
=== Operas for the stage ===
- The Quest to Polyphonia (1989; libretto by Farber), chamber orchestra, soloists (Stuttgart Opera (in German), 1989; The New Israeli Opera (in Hebrew), 1995)
- Dracula and the Ballerina in Chains (1994; libretto by Farber) soloists, chorus, large orchestra (Pfaltzoper 1994)
- The Eternal Triangle Trio an Opera Cartoon (1996; libretto by Farber) soprano, mezzo, baritone, 2 keyboards and drummer (Kölneroper coproducer Vienna Opern Theater 1996)
- Operation Mitternacht (2001–2002; libretto Y. Kaldi) seven singers, chamber orchestra (Bonn Opera 2002)

=== Music for Ballet ===
- Impressions (of Tel Aviv) (Batsheva 1981)
- HaEm (Inbal 1987)
- 5 1/2 (Mann im Schatten) (Stuttgart 1991)

=== Operas (and music theater) for the radio ===
- Spot(t)-Operetten (1982; libretto by Farber) (BR 1982)
- Spielzeugoperetten (1984; libretto by Farber) (BR 1984)
- 37 Depression Miniatures (1990–2005; libretto by Farber) mezzo, basso, violin, viola, actor (WDR 2005)
- Before Ken ‘n Barbie (2005–2011; libretto by Farber) soprano, subrette, alto, chamber orchestra

=== Orchestral Music ===
- Dichotomy, a Symphony (1996–2005) (WDR 2005)
- Midnight, a Symphony (2010–2013)
- Passacaglia Nr. One (1994-2008 Duisburg Phil. 2008)
- Concerto Großo for Percussion and Orchestra (Duisburg Phil. 2008)

=== Chamber music vocal ===
- Four Dreams of Death (1984) viola and basso text Farber (ORF 1984)
- Verchiedene 13 song cycles (2009–2013) baritone and piano text Heinrich Heine (WDR 2009+2013)

=== Chamber music instrumental ===
- Angélique (2009) piano, violin and cello
- String Quartet (2006)
- Wind Quintet (2007)

=== Music for solo piano ===
- Talmudic Dialogue Nr. 1 (2008)
- Talmudic Dialogue Nr. 2 (2009)
- Passacaglia Nr. 2 for Piano (2008)
- Passacaglia Nr. 3 for Piano (2008)

=== Film and theater music ===
- Music for Lights, a story of Chanukka (1984) an animated film, chamber orchestra
- Music for Prose theater—inquire at the Theater Archives of the Tel Aviv University
