= Yehuda Yannay =

American classical composer

- יהודה ינאי
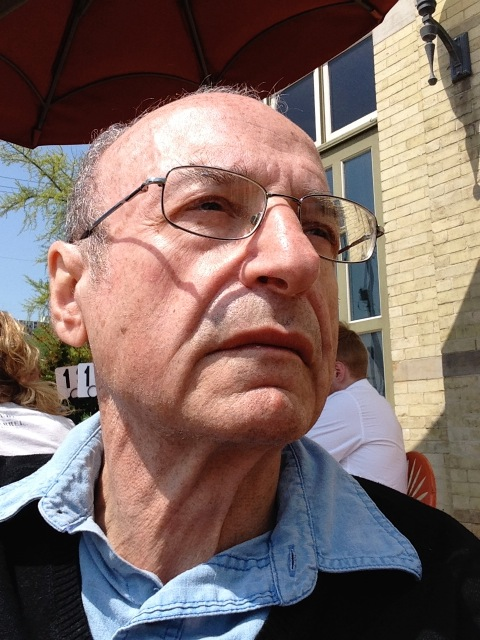
- Yannay in 2016
- Born: May 26, 1937; Timișoara, Romania
- Died: December 14, 2023 (aged 86); Milwaukee, Wisconsin, U.S.
- Occupations: composer, conductor, filmmaker and performance artist.
- Era: 20th century

Yehuda Yannay (Hebrew: יהודה ינאי; May 26, 1937 – December 14, 2023) was a composer. He was born in Timișoara, Romania, and emigrated to Israel in 1951. In Israel, he studied at the Rubin Academy, Tel Aviv. He subsequently studied at Brandeis University, the Tanglewood Music Center and the University of Illinois, before becoming a faculty member at the University of Wisconsin–Milwaukee (UW–M). He was an emeritus professor of music at UW–M.

== Biography ==
Yannay was born to Hungarian-speaking Jewish parents on 26 May 1937 in Timișoara, in the Banat region of Romania. Against all odds he and his immediate family in Timișoara and Budapest survived the Holocaust era.

Yannay studied piano as a child but had no particular interest in music. His childhood interests were in natural sciences. In 1948 the Romanian Communist regime expropriated his parents' house and small paper-goods factory. The family was allowed to immigrate to Israel in 1951 and had to renounce Romanian citizenship.

In Israel he attended the elite agricultural high school at Pardes Hanna Agricultural High School(Hebrew: בית הספר התיכון החקלאי פרדס חנה) with a full scholarship and served after graduation in the Military Police Corps of the Israel Defense Forces as a criminal investigator. After years of hiatus, he resumed sporadic piano lessons and started to compose small piano pieces, albeit without any formal composition study.

In 1959 he was accepted as a private pupil by Alexander Uriah Boskovich with whom he studied until 1964. Boskovich introduced him immediately to twentieth-century techniques and influenced him greatly as a composer and, eventually, as a teacher of composition. He was the youngest composer to be published by the Israel Music Institute, the newly established state-supported publisher of Israeli composers. After completing his studies in music theory at the Rubin Academy of Music in Tel-Aviv in 1964, he pursued postgraduate studies in America, enabled by a Fulbright Fellowship, the first ever awarded in Israel in musical composition. At Brandeis University (MFA 1966), he studied with Arthur Berger and Ernst Krenek and at the University of Illinois Urbana–Champaign (DMA 1974) he studied with Salvatore Martirano among others. Between 1966 and 1968 he was a Dean at the Israel Conservatory of Music in Tel-Aviv, a part-time position from which he was fired after initiating the unionization of its teachers.

After participating in the Six-Day War, Yannay returned to the US in 1968 at the invitation of the musicologist Dr. Alexander Ringer to complete a doctorate at the University of Illinois Urbana–Champaign. In 1970 he became part of the music faculty of the University of Wisconsin–Milwaukee He also taught as visiting professor at the University of Texas at Dallas and was a Fulbright professor at the State University of Music and Performing Arts Stuttgart and Hochschule für Musik und Theater Hamburg.

Yehuda Yannay retired in 2004 from his position of Professor of Composition at the University of Wisconsin–Milwaukee. In 1971 while at UW–Milwaukee he founded the Music From Almost Yesterday concert series that has continued uninterrupted for 51 years. An archive, housed by the University of Wisconsin–Milwaukee's Golda Meir Library, of Yannay's career can be found here.

== Work ==
As Yannay started composing in the early 1960s, he was immediately drawn to avant-garde innovations in music: serialism, open-ended form, graphic notation, and new sound materials generated through electroacoustic devices. Early in his career he made original contributions to expanded instrumental and vocal performance practices.

In his doctoral thesis entitled Toward an Open-Ended Method of Analysis of Contemporary Music: A Study of Selected Works by Edgard Varèse and György Ligeti (1974), Yannay spells out his esthetic and technical approach to the understanding and composing of music at the peak of modernism, the point in music history when he started in composition career. In the introduction of his dissertation he explains his approach to music as a "concrete object that can be named musical, existing both in nature and artifact". According to him: "the minimal definition of an object named musical is an arrangement of sound and silence, which may or may not have imply functional order and it exists in a conceptual space and time." His premise challenges the dictum of prescriptive (therefore closed) systems such as Schenkerian theory, or set theory to analyze music. By extension, it also frees contemporary composers and performers from adhering to a tradition: be it a classic (such as serial music) or a trendy avant-garde practice. By the late 1950s, there evolved a sense of a new freedom to stay away from monolithic "composition schools" that instigated factionalism among established and younger composers.

The thesis contains the first published complete analysis of Octandre (1924) by Varèse, and the first complete analysis of a composition by Ligeti, the Ten Pieces for Wind Quintet (1969). The dissertation's last chapter contains analyses/descriptions of excerpts from Yannay's Mirkamim, Textures of Sound for Large Orchestra (1967), Mutatis Mutandis for six players (1968), and preFIX-FIX-sufFIX for bassoon, horn and cello (1971). Mirkamim was selected for the 1968 Gaudeamus International Festival in Holland, and Mutatis Mutandis represented Israel at the 1969 ISCM International Festival in Hamburg. Yannay could not afford to attend the premieres.

He and his first wife Yona arrived in Champaign–Urbana in September 1968 via Paris and Chicago. They missed, by a few days each, the historic riots in those two cities that took place that summer. The School of Music at University of Illinois Urbana–Champaign was an internationally recognized hotbed of new-music activity from the 1950s to the 1970s, led by composers such as Kenneth Gaburo, Salvatore Martirano, Ben Johnston, Lejaren Hiller and Herbert Brün. When Edwin London joined the faculty in 1969, the instrumental, vocal and multimedia scope of concerts expanded. This unconventional scenario prompted Yannay to create new works using originally invented theatrical and instrumental devices that formed the basis of Wraphap (1969), Coloring Book for the Harpist (1969), Coheleth (1970) and similar works. Also, it gave him the first chance to start conducting new works by fellow composers.

These experiences turned out to be an apt preparation to the founding of Music From Almost Yesterday (MFAY) series at the University of Wisconsin–Milwaukee (UWM) in 1970. Upon arriving in Milwaukee he found a community of young musicians at UWM who were eager to establish a solid forum for New Music. His principle cohorts at that time were Kenton Meyer, flutist, Monte Perkins, bassoonist, and Raymond Weisling, a composer, tuba player, and experimenter in electronics. In 1972 Yannay was awarded a major grant from the NEH to present the Milwaukee Fresh Music Fare, the largest contemporary music festival to date in that city.

Many of Yannay's earliest pieces were based on invented modal melodies inspired by music that he heard and admired in Israel: Sephardi and Yemenite folk and liturgical music as well as Arabic music. These rich musical resources continued to nourish his music through his entire creative career. In parallel to all other inspirational resources, compositional models in expanded score form and graphic notation came from realization in sound of abstract art (action painting, collage and geometric color field styles) that dealt primarily with texture, color, numbers and proportions. An encounter with the Theater of the Absurd in the late 1950s inspired his theatrical-performance works that led eventually to collaborative filmmaking and acting in such films as Jidyll (1990) and Houdini's Ninth (1973).

In the liner notes to the CRI recording (SD 437) of his song cycle "At the End of the Parade" (1974), for baritone and six instrumentalists, Yannay wrote that beginning in 1970 his compositional style underwent a gradual change, which he described as a shift toward greater freedom and directness in musical expression. He stated that this development was not the result of a deliberate stylistic decision but emerged over time as his musical preferences evolved.

Yannay further indicated that this period marked a move away from what he termed an "International Style" toward a more individualized approach to composition. His subsequent works are characterized by experimentation with subject matter, media, and extended vocal and instrumental techniques, often requiring significant technical demands from performers. He also noted that many of his compositions were developed in collaboration with performers capable of meeting these challenges.

In 1982 Yannay received a Fulbright guest professorship in Stuttgart and returned to Europe after a hiatus of 31 years. Germany was already in a high-gear phase of stock-taking of its dim National Socialist past. Yannay's deeply felt response was a series of works under the title European Trilogy that included Im Silberwald for trombone, glass harmonica and tape (1983), Celan Ensembles for tenor and instruments (1986), vocal and instrumental pieces, the electronic theater piece In Madness There is Order (1988) and the music film Jidyll (1990). The trombone solo piece, along with the choral Le campane di Leopardi (1979) use a fixed drone of tuned glasses and electronics, diatonic and just-intonation proportions to a central note that extends the entire work. As the first non-German composer who delved into the complex poetry of Paul Celan, a Holocaust survivor, in its original language, Yannay collaged his texts from different poems and wedded it to the non-sequitur texts and the persona of Antonin Artaud. Both endured madness and a tragic end in Paris.

A number of his orchestral scale compositions were performed and commissioned by Edwin London after he established the Cleveland Chamber Symphony (1980), which became a unique forum for larger-scale pieces for living composers. These include Exit Music at Century's End (1995) and Piano Concerto (2002) for piano solo and 15 instruments. These pieces represent on grander scale the maturation of a Yannay compositional style that can be traced back to "Trio" for clarinet, cello and piano (1982). Other large ensemble works include Rhapsody for alto saxophone and wind ensemble (2005) and Nuances argentées (Shades of Silver) (2006) for recorded voice and flute orchestra of 24 players.

All instrumental and vocal works that have been written since the early 1980s for existing ensembles and virtuoso soloists have been, and are still written in the spirit of a form of Janus effect: cognizant of the musical-cultural past while looking for yet unexplored territories of expression. Hornology for horn (2004), a quasi-theatrical solo work that may be considered the most complex music written for the instrument is a perfect illustration of the above. Other examples in this vein are the Three Organic Pieces (2004) for organ and Marrakesh Bop for microtonal flute and guitar (1999) based on an original maqam and the densest microtonal inflections realized by pulling guitar strings.

A pinnacle in the total media realization using cabbalistic permutations on Hebrew alphabet is found in Radiant, Inner Light (1998–2000) for speaker, musical saw, metal percussion, percussion fountain, projections and calligrams. This piece occupied an evening of performance and exhibition space for invented metal instruments (in collaboration with Steven Pevnick) played in multi-tempi polyphonies and visuals. Instrumentalists are also becoming performance artists in Insomnia in Havana, a theater piece for a percussionist/actor, live electronics and projections (2005) and Midwest Mythologist (2012) a theater piece for a pianist.

His millennial period started with a close collaboration with the bayan/accordion virtuoso Stas Venglevski that produced a multitude of chamber and ensemble works expanding the repertory for the instruments. They include My Main Squeeze (2000) for trumpet, accordion and cello and Plus Avec Moins (PAM) – More From Less (MFL) (2012) for solo accordion and 24 flutes. Similar composer-performer relationships are continuing with, among others, pianist Jeri-Mae Astolfi (Bits Into Pieces (2014) for piano and iPad electronics) and violist Yossi Guttman (The Exquisite Viola (2013) for viola solo). In 2017 he premiered a string quartet Two Alleys in Old Tel-Aviv(2013) in Berlin and a saxophone quartet The Center Does Not Hold (2016) in Minneapolis. As of this update in 2022, Yannay produced continuously new works and new premieres that included Berlin Music(2018) for string trio premiered in Berlin in 2018, Janus Chamber Symphony for 13 Players (2020) premiered in Budapest 2020. Most recently his "Three Pieces for Saxophone and Harp"(2022) and "Ten Hommages and Fantasietta" (2020-21) for solo piano were uploaded on his Vimeo page and are available for viewing.
