= Ayal Adler =

Israeli composer

Ayal Adler אייל אדלר
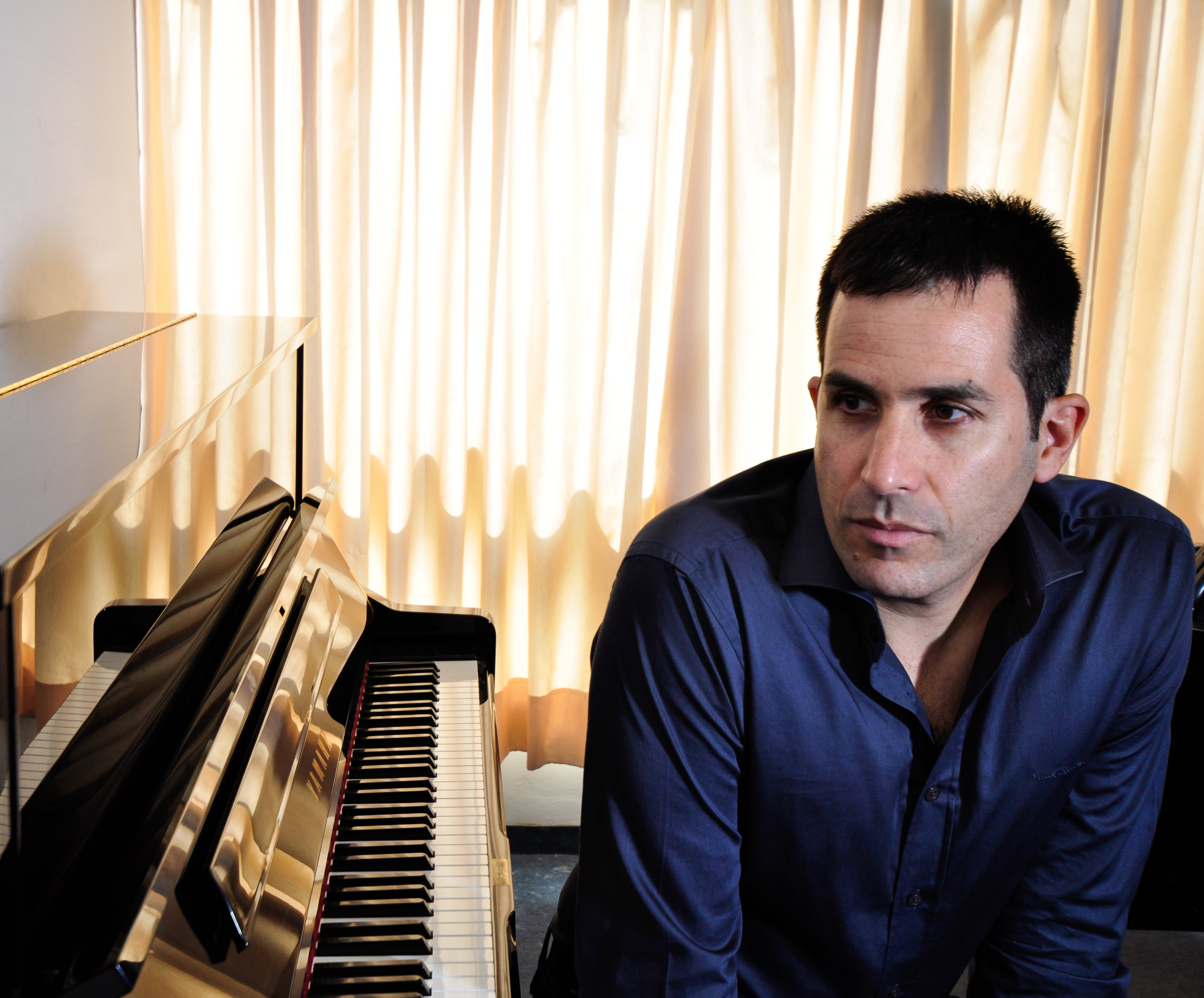

Background information
- Origin: Israel
- Genres: Classical, Contemporary
- Occupation: Composer
- Education: B.Mus in Composition, Jerusalem Academy of Music and Dance (1995); Artist Diploma in Composition (with Honors), Jerusalem Academy of Music and Dance (1997); Doctorate in Music Composition (DMA), McGill University (2002)
- Awards: Two Prime Minister Awards for Composers; Two ACUM Prizes; First prize at the RMN International Composition Competition

Ayal Adler (Hebrew: אייל אדלר), is an Israeli composer. Active internationally, his works are continuously performed worldwide. Serves as associate professor in composition and theory at the Jerusalem Academy of Music and Dance. Currently holds the positions of Chair, Department of Composition , Conducting and Theory at the Jerusalem Academy, and Artistic Director at the Israel Composers League. Recipient of numerous awards, including: Two Prime- Minister Awards for Composers; Two Acum Prizes (equivalent to ASCAP), and International prizes.

== Biography ==
Ayal Adlerr's compositions were performed in recent years in the United States; Canada; Germany; Austria; England; Lithuania; Spain; Finland; Czech Republic; Russia; Hungary; Croatia; South Korea, and more. Adler's oeuvre includes music in various genres including solo, chamber, vocal, and orchestral. His work, In Motion - Concerto for Continuo and Large Orchestra was commissioned by the Bregenz Festival in 2023. Resonating Sounds for Large Orchestra was commissioned and premiered by Daniel Barenboim and the West-Eastern DIVAN Orchestra, at the following venues: BBC Proms, Royal Albert Hall; Lucerne Festival; Salzburg Festival; Colon Theatre, Buenos Aires. His song cycle, Alone, I return from the Night, was commissioned and premiered by the Munich Philharmonic, cond. by Omer Meir Wellber, with soprano Hila Baggio. Crystallization for Large Orchestra was re-premiered by Zubin Mehta and the Israeli Philharmonic. Postlude for Large Ensemble was re-premiered by Matthias Pintscher and Meitar Ensemble. Ayal Adler's works are often performed at International Festivals, such as the International Society of Contemporary Music (ISCM); Jerusalem International Chamber Music Festival; Asian Composers' League (ACL), and more. In Israel, his music was premiered, among others, by The Israel Philharmonic Orchestra; Israel Camerata Orchestra Jerusalem; Israel Symphony Orchestra; Jerusalem Symphony Orchestra; Meitar Ensemble; Israel Contemporary Soloists; Raanana Symphonette Orchestra; Tel Aviv Soloists Ensemble, and more, under the baton of Omer Meir Wellber; Matthias Pintscher; Ilan Volkov; Frédéric Chaslin; Pierre-André Valade; Zsolt Nagy, and others.

Ayal Adler was born in Jerusalem. After receiving a Diploma in Piano and Composition from the Rubin Jerusalem Conservatory, he enrolled at the Jerusalem Academy of Music and Dance. There, he completed a B.Mus. and an Artist Diploma in Composition (with Honors). He then pursued a Doctoral degree in composition at McGill University in Montreal. Ayal Adler is a full-time faculty at the Jerusalem Academy of Music and Dance, and serves as an associate professor in Composition and Theory. In recent years he held various academic positions, such as chair, Composition and Conducting Faculty, dean of students, and others. He currently serves as a board member of the Israeli Composers' League (ICL).

Recipient of numerous awards and grants, including: First Prize at the International Composition Competition RMN Music in London, 2018, for his work Chase; Prime- Minister Award for Composers (2008); Two ACUM Prizes: Achievement Award of the Year Award for Quintet (2012), and orchestral award for Crystallization (2003); Commissions from the America-Israel Cultural Fund, including a Fulbright Grant for Doctoral Studies; commissions from the Adele and John Gray Endowment Fund, and others. Mr. Adler was nominated Composer-in-Residence for the Meitar ensemble from 2006 -2012, and later on became the Ensemble's Advisor. Six compact discs containing his works were released in recent years. His works are regularly published by the Israeli Music Institute (IMI), and the Israeli Music Center (IMC). Ayal Adler's works were recorded and played on BBC Radio 4; Radio Swiss; Radio France; Israeli Radio Kan HaMusica, and others.

== Compositions ==
- In Motion- Concerto for Continuo and Large Orchestra (2022- 2023). 20 min.
- Shades, for Violin, Violincello, and Piano (2022). 10 min.
- Transparent Lights, for Violin and Viilincello ( 2022). 8 min.
- Imaginary Figures, for Piano (2020). 11 min
- Hidden Light, for large ensemble (2020). 13 min.
- Alone, I return from the Night.Three songs and Interludes for Soprano and Large Orchestra (2019). 18 min.
- Circular Breathing, for String orchestra (2018/2021). 15 min
- Lines, interrupted, for Violin and strings (2019). 14 min
- Rock Expressions for Guitars and ensemble (2016). 15 min
- Double Concerto for Single Guitarist and large orchestra (2016). 15 min
- Concerto for Mandolin and strings (2015).14 min
- Misterioso (2015) for piano. 8'.
- Resonating Sounds, for large orchestra (2014/2018). 17 min
- Colors of Dust, for fl, cl, vn, vc, pno (2013). 14 min
- Solitary, I return from the night (2012). Three songs for soprano and orchestra. Texts: David Vogel. 15 min
- Postlude, for a large ensemble (2011). 10'.
- Allegretto Misterioso, for Two Pianos (2011). 10'.
- For Four, Piano 4 Hand (2015). 8'
- Two Short Pieces for piano (2010). 7'.
- Quintet for pno, fl, cl, vn and vc (2009). 15'.
- Or Haganuz, for a large ensemble (2008). 14'.
- At the Gate of Darkness (2006), two songs for mezzo-soprano, fl, cl, bsn, vn, vc and pno. Texts: David Vogel: As night approaches; At the gate of Darkness. 14'.
- Reminiscence (2005) for violin and piano. 18'.
- Circles in Time (2004) for fl, cl, vc, prc and pno. 14'.
- Shades.. to Colors (2003) for piano and string quartet. 12'.
- Crystallization (2001) for large orchestra. 17'.
- Voyages (1999) for orchestra. 10'.
- Dialogues (1998) for piano and large ensemble (12 players). 14'.
- Largo (1997) for violin and orchestra. 14'.
- Two Pieces for piano(1996): Allegro Agitato; Andante Sostenuto. 10'. -
- String Quartet (1995) in four movements. 14'.
- Five Short Pieces for Clarinet (1995). 10'.
- Three Songs for Women's Choir (1994): Kirya Yefeifia; Se'I Yona; Nitzanim Nir'u Ba'aretz. 13'.

== Discography ==
- Gate of Darkness, for mezzo-soprano and ensemble.in :"Ensemble Meitar, 2010"
- 'REMISCENCE', works 2003–2009. Sponsored by the Israeli Composers' League
- Reminiscence for Violin and Piano, in: "Ensemble Meitar, 2008"
- Voyages for orchestra, in: "Music in Time", 2005, a publication of the Jerusalem Academy of Music and Dance
- Ayal Adler – 'WORKS 1997–1999'. Including: Misterioso; Voyages; Dialogues. Sponsored by Jerusalem Municipality, Culture Department. Jerusalem, 2002

== Articles ==
- "Tristan Murail and Spectral Music", Music in Time 2005, pp. 87–91*
