= Mordecai Seter =

Israeli composer (1916–1994)

- מרדכי סתר
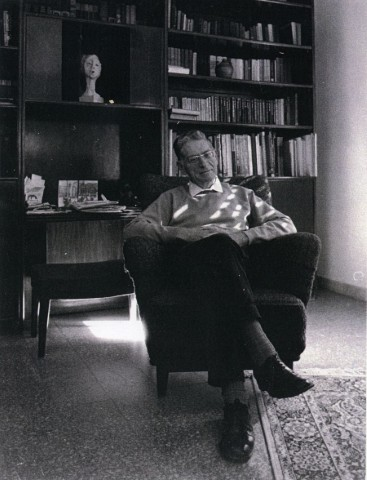
- Mordecai Seter
- Born: Marc Starominsky; 26 February 1916; Novorossiysk, Russia
- Died: 8 August 1994 (aged 78); Tel Aviv, Israel
- Education: Studied with Paul Dukas and Nadia Boulanger, École Normale de Musique, Paris; Private lessons with Igor Stravinsky
- Occupation: Composer
- Known for: Midnight Vigil
- Awards: Israel Prize (1965); ACUM Prize (1983)

Mordecai Seter (Hebrew: מרדכי סתר; February 26, 1916 – August 8, 1994), was a Russian-born Israeli composer.

== Early life ==
Seter was born Marc Starominsky in Novorossiysk, Russia, in 1916 and emigrated with his family to Mandate Palestine in 1926.

Seter learned to play the piano from the age of seven in Russia, and continued with his lessons and studies in Tel Aviv. In 1932, he went to Paris, France, where he studied composition at the Ecole Normale de Musique with Paul Dukas and Nadia Boulanger. He also had some lessons with Stravinsky. With Boulanger, Seter mastered Renaissance polyphony and contemporary French style, but in 1937, frustrated by the extent of her devotion to Stravinskian neoclassicism, he returned to Palestine. There, he pursued a musical language founded on his own unique synthesis of the latter, and other, European influences with more local ones.

== Style ==
Upon his return to Palestine in 1937, Seter grew interested in developing a style inspired by Middle Eastern Jewish musical traditions. In Paris, he had been fascinated with cantus firmus-based techniques found in Western Medieval and Renaissance music, which derived from Catholic plainchant. Therefore, when, in 1938, he encountered the volumes of Abraham Zevi Idelsohn's Thesaurus of Hebrew Oriental Melodies that contained traditional Sephardic and Mizrahi liturgical tunes, he consciously adopted them as a major influence, not only in and of themselves, but eventually as sources for the intervalic character of his own new modes. That this melos bore the local accent of spoken Hebrew was a further attraction for Seter, especially since he was focused on choral music at the time.

In some ways, Seter's usage and internalization of traditional material resembled that of Bartók, and like Bartók (though to a lesser extent), he made many transcriptions himself. He shared this affinity with Bartók with two of his friends and colleagues, Alexander Uriyah Boskovich and Oedoen Partos, who, together with Seter, were known in the 1950s and 1960s as the "Troika". However, he revealed greater awareness of the tensions between Mizrahi and Western style and aesthetics, and emphasised the distinction between mere exoticism and genuine stylistic synthesis. In most stylistic particulars, too, Seter's methods were fully distinct and strikingly original. In the 1940s and 50s, when his output was largely choral, he mainly used the traditional tunes in dramatically charged polyphonic textures. But the later part of this period was transitory for Seter: his Sonata for two violins (1951) is built from Western church modes, while his Duets for two violins (1951–54) are based on collections of between four and ten pitches. The stage was set for his magnum opus, the oratorio Midnight Vigil, commissioned by Sarah Levi-Tanai and the Inbal Dance Theatre, which reached its final of five versions in 1961. Here, Mizrahi tunes are prominent, but also fundamental to the work's sound and structure is a twelve-note synthetic scale of alternating minor and augmented seconds. This scale interacts seamlessly with the borrowed melodies and governs the cantata's harmonic language, ensuring its remarkable cohesion through the common features of its musical elements.

After Midnight Vigil, Seter consistently used modes and scales of at least twelve notes, which subsumed the borrowed materials but retained their essence. At first, as in the ballet Judith (1962–63), commissioned by Martha Graham (as was the later Part Real, Part Dream [1964]), his modes took the form of twelve-tone rows and their treatment that of serial technique, though without transposition and with emphasis on certain pitches to create at times a sense of tonal center. Seter felt his methods then and later to be more like theme and variation than serialism. By the 1970s, his style had developed further: the modes now unfold the aggregate diatonically over as many as two octaves (in as many as 25 pitches), leading in such cases to pitch-class repetition and contributing to Seter's cherished sense of pitch centricity. The modes' adjacent intervals are always seconds, whether minor, major, augmented, or doubly-augmented.

Seter's works from 1970 on, all for chamber combinations or piano, are intensely introspective, perhaps mirroring the contemporaneous feelings of the man who wrote them. As one scholar writes:

[A]round 1970, when he felt that the fame he had gained following the Israel Prize (1965) was more a burden than a joy, he gradually withdrew from social activity, including contacts with performers, to the point that he refused to write on commission, and kept composing upon inspiration only.

Nevertheless, "his music possessed a spirituality that was sensed by critics and audiences alike."

== Teaching career ==
Beginning in 1946, Seter taught at the Music Teachers' College. From 1951 until his retirement in 1985, Seter was one of the most influential teachers at the Rubin Academy of Tel Aviv University (previously the Israel Conservatory). His students included composers Tzvi Avni, Arie Shapira, Nurit Hirsh and the conductor Gary Bertini.

== Reception ==
Seter's oratorio Midnight Vigil was regarded as a seminal masterpiece of Israeli music since its premiere in 1963. An earlier, radiophonic version was submitted by the Israel Broadcasting Authority to the 1962 Prix Italia international radio competition, and won the first prize in the “stereophonic musical work” category. The final, concert version, premiered in 1963, was subsequently paired with Beethoven's Ninth Symphony on the Israel Philharmonic Orchestra's Millennium Festival program of 1 January 2000. His later music, however, was often considered as introverted, reserved, even hermetic, a view which, according to musicologists Uri Golomb and Ronit Seter, "downplayed the palpable sensuous and dramatic aspects of his music, denying an essential aspect of Seter’s works".

== Awards ==
Seter's many awards include the following:

- In 1965, Seter was awarded the Israel Prize for music.
- In 1983, he won the ACUM Prize for lifetime achievements.

== Selected works ==
- Sabbath Cantata for solo, chorus, and string orchestra (1940)
- Motets for chorus ATB (1939–40, rev. 1951)
- Motteti for male chorus with optional wind octet (1940–51, rev. 1985)
- Four Festive Songs for unaccompanied chorus (1943–9)
- Sonata for two violins (1951–2)
- Sinfonietta for orchestra (1953–7, rev. 1966–70)
- Ricercar for string trio and string ensemble (1953–6)
- Elegy for clarinet or viola with piano or string quartet (1954)
- Chaconne and Scherzo for piano (1956)
- Yemenite Diwan for orchestra or chamber orchestra (1957)
- Valliant Woman, ballet (1957)
- Midnight Vigil for solo, three choruses, and orchestra (1957–61)
- The Legend of Judith, ballet (1962)
- Part Real, Part Dream, ballet (1964)
- Fantasia concertante for orchestra (1964; rev. of Part Real, Part Dream)
- Jephtah's Daughter, ballet (1965)
- Jerusalem for 8-part chorus with brass and strings (or unaccomp.) (1966)
- Hagut [Meditation] for orchestra (1967)
- Ma'agalim [Rounds] for string orchestra (1967–8)
- Espressivo for string orchestra (1971)
- Janus for piano (1971)
- Piano Trio (1973)
- Trio for clarinet, violoncello, and piano (1973)
- String Quartet No. 1 (1975)
- Quartetto sinfonico (String Quartet No. 2) (1976)
- String Quartet No. 3 (1976)
- String Quartet No. 4 (1977)
- Monodrama for viola and piano (1977)
- Mirvachim [Intervals] for piano (1977)
- Capricci for piano (1977)
- Sine Nomine for piano (1981)
- Piano Sonata (1982)
- Music for piano (1982)
- Piano Cycle for piano (1982)
- Dialogues for piano (1983)
- Improvisation for piano (1983)
- Triptyque for piano (1985)
- Post Scriptum for string quartet (1986)
- Presence for piano (1986)

== See also ==
- List of Israel Prize recipients
