= Paul Ben-Haim =

Israeli composer (1897–1984)

- פאול בן חיים
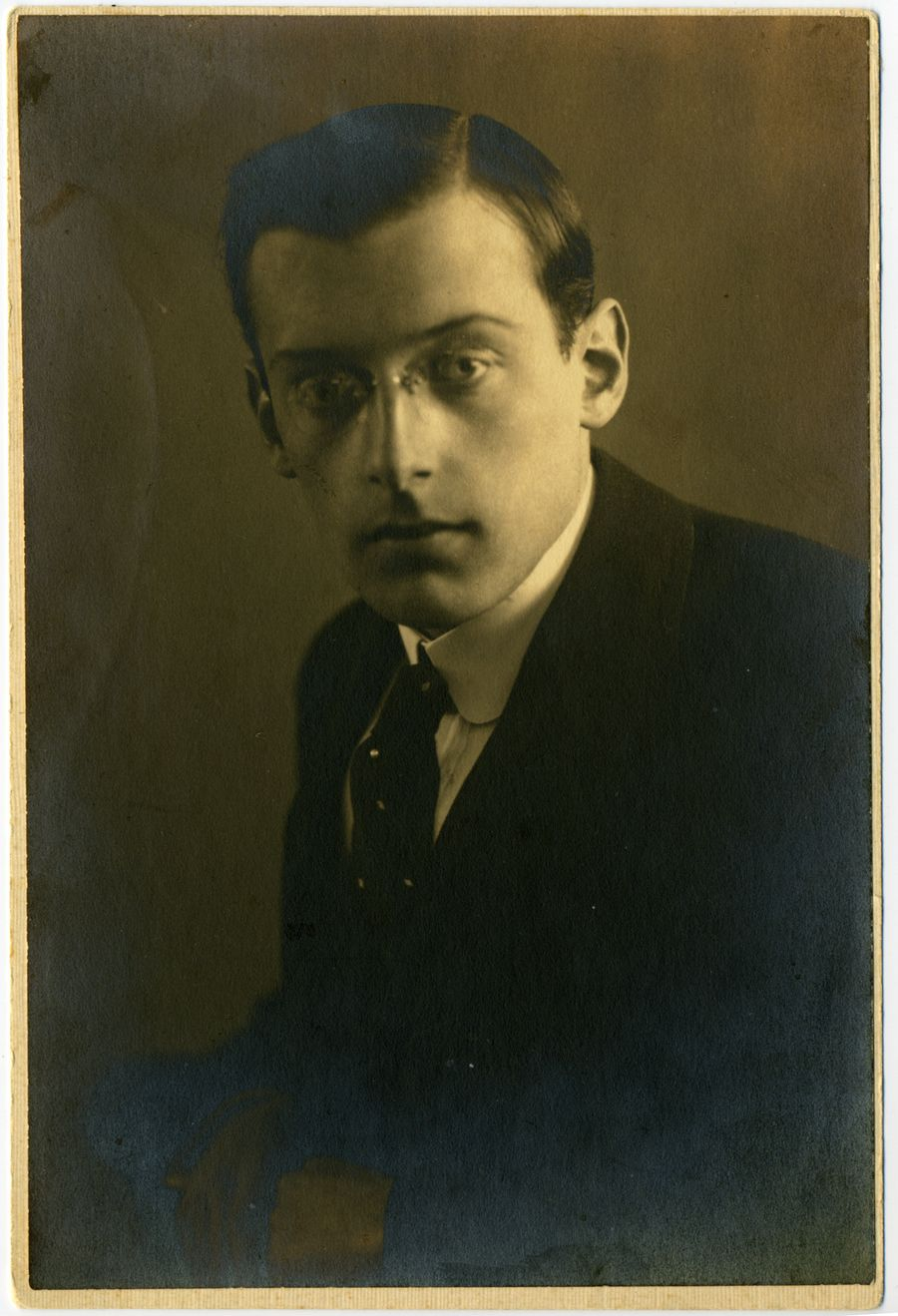
- Born: Paul Frankenburger; July 5, 1897; Munich, Germany
- Died: January 14, 1984 (aged 86); Tel Aviv, Israel
- Occupation: Composer

Paul Ben-Haim (or Paul Ben-Chaim, Hebrew: פאול בן חיים; 5 July 1897 – 14 January 1984) was an Israeli composer.

== Biography ==
Paul Frankenburger (later Ben-Haim) was born in Munich, Germany. He studied composition with Friedrich Klose and he was assistant conductor to Bruno Walter and Hans Knappertsbusch from 1920 to 1924. He served as conductor at Augsburg from 1924 to 1931, and afterwards devoted himself to teaching and composition, including teaching at the Shulamit Conservatory in Tel Aviv, Israel.

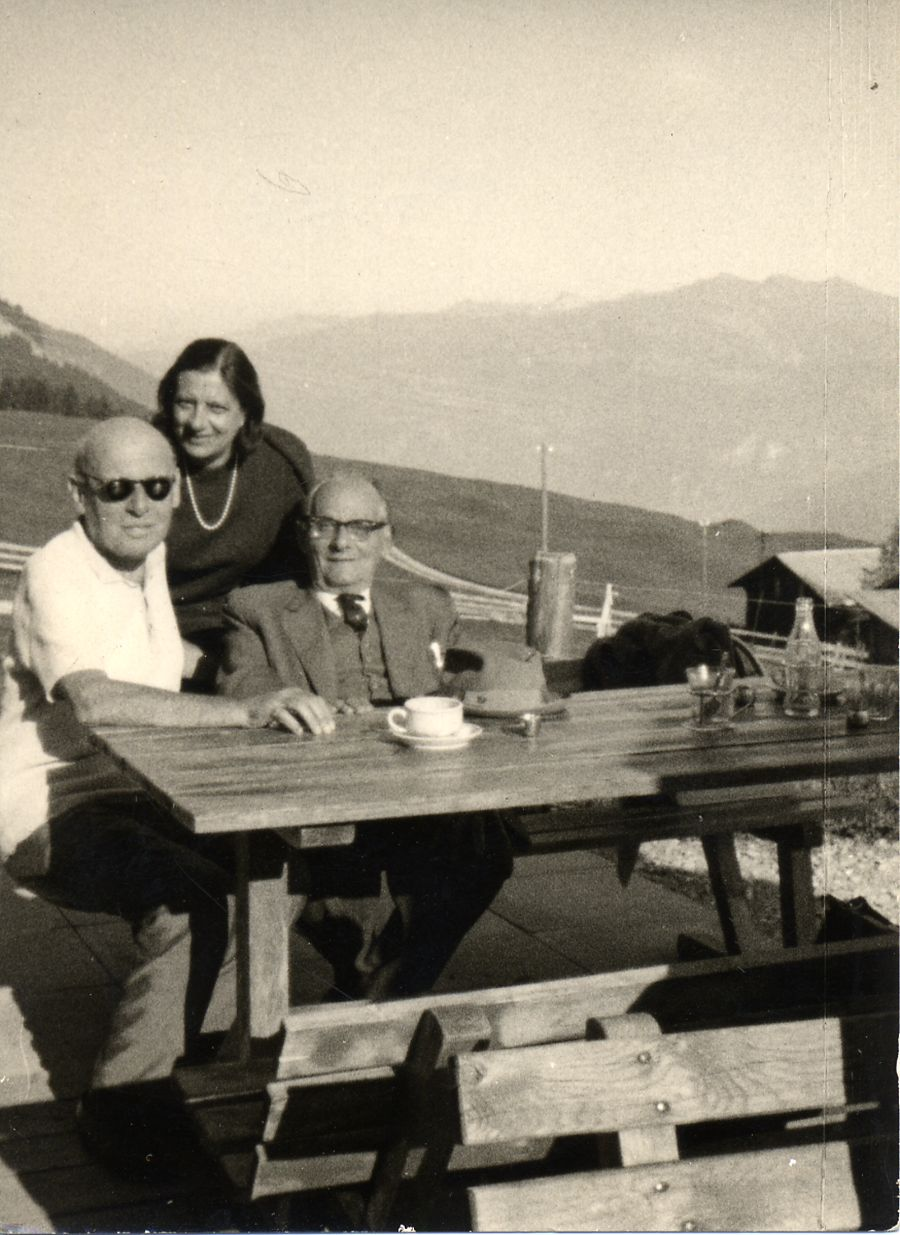
Paul Ben-Haim and his wife, Heli, with the writer Max Brod

Ben-Haim immigrated to British Mandate of Palestine in 1933 and lived in Tel Aviv, near Zina Dizengoff Square. He Hebraized his name, becoming an Israeli citizen upon that nation's independence in 1948.

== Music career ==
Ben-Haim composed chamber music, works for choir, orchestra and solo instruments, and songs. He championed a specifically Jewish national music: his own compositions are in a late Romantic vein with Middle Eastern overtones, somewhat similar to Ernest Bloch.

Ben-Haim's Symphony No. 1 premiered in 1941. It is considered the first symphony written in Israel.

His students include Eliahu Inbal, Henri Lazarof, Ben-Zion Orgad, Ami Maayani, Shulamit Ran, Miriam Shatal, Rami Bar-Niv and Noam Sheriff. [See: List of music students by teacher: A to B#Paul Ben-Haim.] Ben-Haim won the Israel Prize for music in 1957.

The archive of Ben-Haim is preserved in the National Library of Israel.

== Works, editions and recordings ==
Selected recordings:

- Cello Concerto (composer's revised version 1972, with Uzi Wiesel) and the complete cello repertoire: Music for violoncello · Three songs without words (for cello and orchestra) · Two Landscapes, Ofer Canetti (cello), Andrei Gologan (piano), Württemberg Philharmonic of Reutlingen/Friederike Kienle. CAPRICCIO.
- Three songs without words (for cello and piano), Ofer Canetti (cello) Daniel Gerzenberg (piano). CPO.
- Cello Concerto (1962), Raphael Wallfisch(cello), BBC National Orchestra of Wales/Łukasz Borowicz. CPO.
- Clarinet Quintet, Two Landscapes, Canzonetta, Improvisation and Dance, Piano Quartet. ARC Ensemble. Chandos
- Concerto for Strings, Pastoral Variée for clarinet, harp and string orchestra Op 31b (1945 arr. 1962), Three Songs without Words (1952), Music for Strings (1955/56). Talia Or (soprano), Bettins Aust (clarinet), Christine Steinbrecher (harp), Bayerische Kammerphilharmonie, conductor Gabriel Adorján. AVI-MUSIC 8553497 (2022)
- Kabbalat Shabbat (Welcoming the Sabbath, evening service) Soloists, Orchester Jakobsplatz München, Grossmann NEOS.
- Melodies, Arion ARN 68643. Varda Kotler, Jeff Cohen, Philippe Bary and Alexis Galpérine
- Sacred services from Israel. Marc Lavry, Yehezkel Braun, Paul Ben-Haim Kabbalat Shabbat. Naxos. Milken Archive
- Symphony No. 1 (1940), Fanfare to Israel (1950), Symphonic Metamorphoses on a Bach Chorale (1968). NDR Radiophilharmonie Hannover Israel Yinon. CPO
- Symphony No. 2 (1945), Concerto Grosso (1931). NDR Radiophilharmonie Hannover Israel Yinon. CPO
- Symphony No. 2 (1945), Concerto for Strings (1947). Royal Philharmonic Orchestra (Kenneth Alwyn) Stradivari/Jerusalem Records SCD 8003

== See also ==
- List of Israel Prize recipients
