= Abel Ehrlich =

Israeli composer

Abel Ehrlich (Hebrew: אבל ארליך; September 3, 1915 – October 30, 2003) was an Israeli composer. In 1997, Ehrlich won the Israel Prize for Music.

== Biography ==
Erlich was born in 1915 in Cranz, East Prussia. In 1934 he and his family fled from Nazi Germany to Yugoslavia and pursued music studies in Zagreb. He left Yugoslavia in 1939 and, after a short stay in Albania, immigrated to Mandatory Palestine.

In Israel he continued his studies at the Eretz-Israel Conservatory in Jerusalem.

He taught at various institutes such as the Israel Conservatory, the Rubin Academy of Music, Jerusalem; the Rubin Academy of Music, Tel Aviv; Bar-Ilan University and Oranim Academic College.

He died on October 30, 2003, in Tel Aviv, Israel.

== Awards ==
- In 1972, was awarded a prize of the Alte Kirche Foundation, Boswil, Switzerland, for his work ARPMUSIC.
- In 1997, he was awarded the Israel Prize, for music.
- He was awarded the ACUM Prize (8 times), the Liberson Prize (3 times) and the Prime Minister's Prize for Israeli Composers.

== See also ==
- List of Israel Prize recipients
- See: List of music students by teacher: C to F#Abel Ehrlich.
