= Alexander Uriah Boskovich =

Israeli composer (1907–1964)

- אלכסנדר אוריה בּוֹסְקוֹביץ
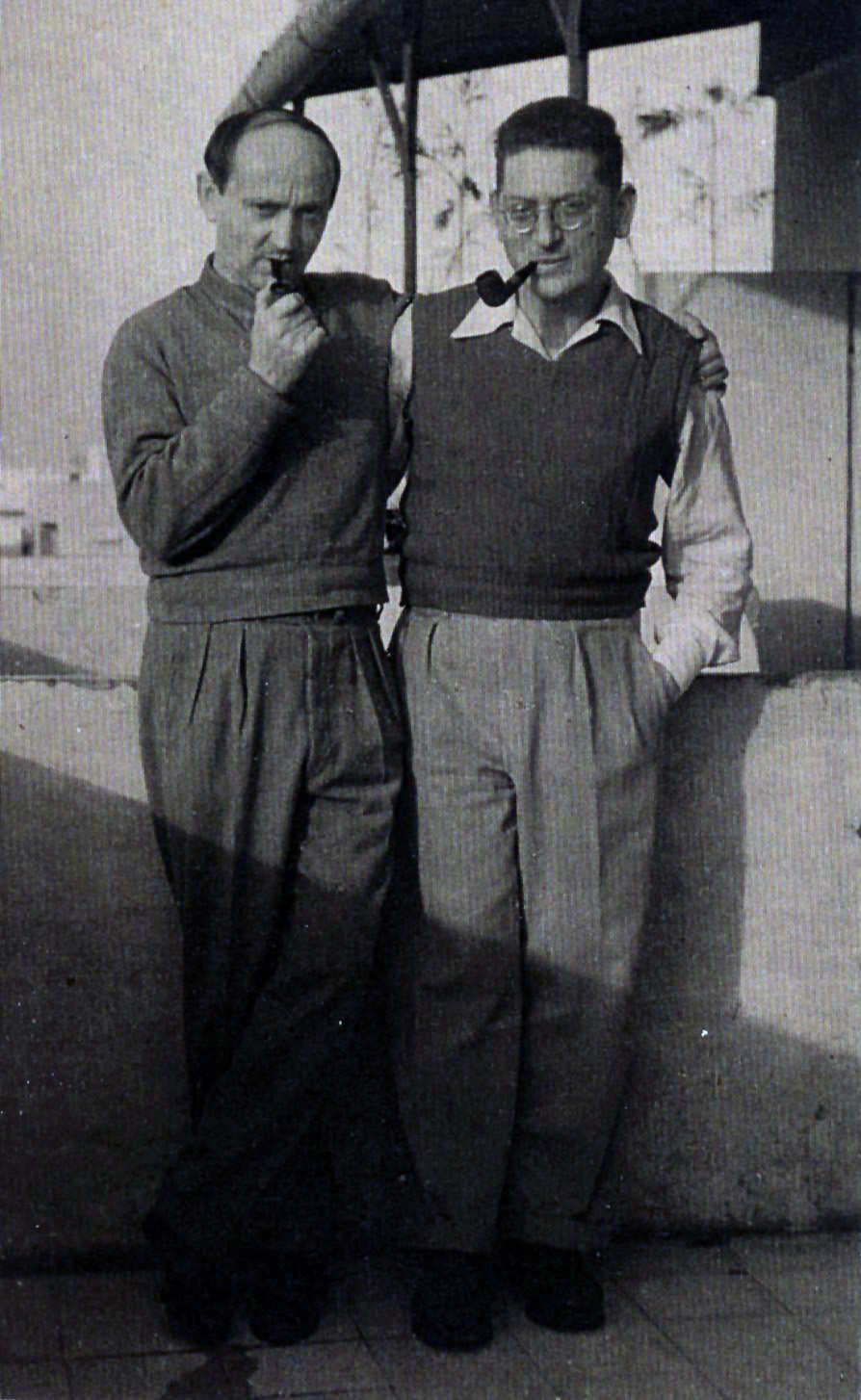
- Composer Uriah Boskovich (left) and Mordecai Seter in the 1940s
- Born: Sándor Boskovich; 16 August 1907; Kolozsvár, Transylvania, Austria-Hungary (now Cluj-Napoca, Romania)
- Died: 5 November 1964 (aged 57); Tel Aviv, Israel
- Occupation: Composer
- Spouse: Miriam Boskovich
- Awards: 1942: Huberman Award; 1946: Engel Award
- Musical career
- Genres: Classical, Israeli folk music

Alexander (Sándor) Uriah Boskovich (Boskovits, Boskowitz, etc.) (Hebrew: אלכסנדר (שאנדור) אוריה בּוֹסְקוֹביץ; August 16, 1907 – November 5, 1964) was an Israeli composer born to a Hungarian-Jewish family.

== Life and career ==
Boskovich was born in Kolozsvár, Transylvania, Austria-Hungary (now Cluj-Napoca, Romania). The origin of his family and of his name was the town Boskovich in Moravia. In Cluj, Boskovich studied in a Jewish high school called "Culture" which accommodated both Neolog and Orthodox Jews.

In 1937, Boskovich sent a piano version of his work "The Golden Chain" to the conductor Issay Dobrowen. This work, based on Jewish songs from the Carpathian Mountains, was originally written for piano and later on, in 1936, transcribed for orchestra. In 1938, Dobrowen suggested to the newly founded Jewish "Palestinian Orchestra", which later on evolved into the Israel Philharmonic Orchestra, to embed this work in a concert under his baton. Boskovich was invited from abroad to the premiere of his composition "Jewish Folk Songs", which was performed by the Palestinian Orchestra. One consequence of that event was that Boskovich decided to stay in the country and settle in Tel Aviv. In the coming years, Boskovich often said that Dobrowen, "The Golden Chain", and the orchestra's invitation saved his life.

One of the cornerstones in the development of the art of music in Palestine during the Yishuv period was the performance of Boskovich's Semitic Suite by the Histadrut Orchestra under the baton of Frank Pelleg. Immediately after his arrival in Israel, Boskovich changed his writing style as is well manifested by his Semitic Suite - from the tonality of Europe into textures that imitated the oud or the Arab kanun.

Writing in the Land of Israel had a profound effect on Boskovich; effect of the varied country's landscapes, the colors of sand and sea, and the sounds of the local music that originated from the various Jewish ethnic groups, as well as from the non-Jewish ones. All of these influences inspired him to develop a personal style peculiar only to himself. Penetrating deep into the Hebrew language served him as one of the most inspiring sources. Unlike others, he did not use songs or dances of the various Jewish ethnicities as a direct source, but rather formed his new ideas based on them. That approach prompted him to compose his Violin Concerto - his first major work since 1942 which won the Bronisław Huberman's first prize. Later on in 1944, it was performed by the violinist Lorand Ervin Fenyves, George Singer conducting. Despite its success, Boskovich lost interest in this Concerto and, in 1957, he re-wrote its middle section as a separate piece for violin and piano. During the same period (1943), he also wrote his Concerto for Oboe and Orchestra which also shows a strong oriental influence. During this period, he became part of an influential clique of composers known as the Troika, together with his colleagues Oedoen Partos and Mordecai Seter, who, according to musicologist Ronit Seter, were united in their "fundamental belief [...] that the local version of contemporary music should reflect local melos, rhythms, views, historical events, and cultural identity".

In 1953 and 1956, Boskovich published a two-part article in Hebrew outlining the ideals behind the music he and others composed during the Yishuv period. This article provided a detailed account on the style which Brod and Boskovich defined as Musica yam-tikhonit (Mediterranean music). According to musicologist Ronit Seter, this extensive article "consisted mainly of guidelines and generalizations about a utopian Israeli style". Boskovich himself was undergoing a period of creative silence while writing this article, and from which he emerged in 1960 with different stylistic priorities.

== Compositions ==
Boskovich's two key Eretz Israel works, Concerto for Oboe and Orchestra and the Semitic Suite, were strongly inspired by the music of Yardena Cohen. The Suite represents fragmented improvisational Middle Eastern motives and piano that sounds like string instruments or Middle Eastern percussion.

Songs of Ascent (1960) was based on the Bible, for spiritual and language effects, and on the Kabbalah for depth and mythical tone. The primary theme of this work is of a Yemenite character.

The Cantata Bat Israel [Daughter of Israel] (1960) is written on the basis of Hayim Nahman Bialik's song of the same title. The lyrics are primarily for a tenor soloist, while the chorus sings verses from the Song of Songs and from the Shabbat prayers. Bialik's text music is written in a modern style, almost surrealistic, while music to the traditional text is written in an archaic style.

"Be-Adiim" (in your ornamental Jewelry), for flute and orchestra, is an instrumental rendition of the Yemenite version of the Songs of Israel related to the splitting of the Red Sea.

Boskovich also composed the song "Dudu" to the words of Haim Hefer which was one of the greatest hits of the 1947–1949 Palestine war. This music, in essence, contradicts everything Boskovich had been preaching. It is flowing and is saturated with tragic memories of the Jewish Eastern-European history; its harmonics are almost romantic. With "Dudu", it seemed as if Boskovich's Semitic tone at once disappeared, and nothing remained of his preaching voice.

== Students and private life ==
Alexander Boskovich had many students: young composers of his own generation as well as older ones. Among his students were Rami Bar-Niv, Max Brod (orchestration), Ezekiel Braun, Theodore Holdheim, Yoram Papourish, Isaac Sedai, Tzevi Snunit, Habib Touma, Yehuda Yannay.

Alexander Boskovich was married to Miriam who was also a musician; she taught piano at the music academy in Tel Aviv. After his death, in Tel Aviv, she cataloged their estate and contributed his manuscripts to the Archive of Israeli Music at the Tel Aviv University.

== Awards ==
- '1942 '- Huberman Award for the Violin Concerto
- '1946 '- Engel Award
