= Israeli Women Composers & Performers Forum =

Women musicians' organization in Israel

The Israeli Women Composers & Performers Forum is a non-profit organization, founded to establish, base and promote women composers in the Israeli music scene, and to bring their music to a wide recognition. The foundation was established in 2000 by the composer Hagar Kadima as the Israeli Women Composers Forum. In 2014 the Forum has also expanded to include women performers, thus getting its current name. In the same year, the Forum has become a musical organization uniting composers and performers and is assisted by the Felicja Blumenthal Music Center, Tel Aviv.

== The activities that led to the establishment of the Forum ==
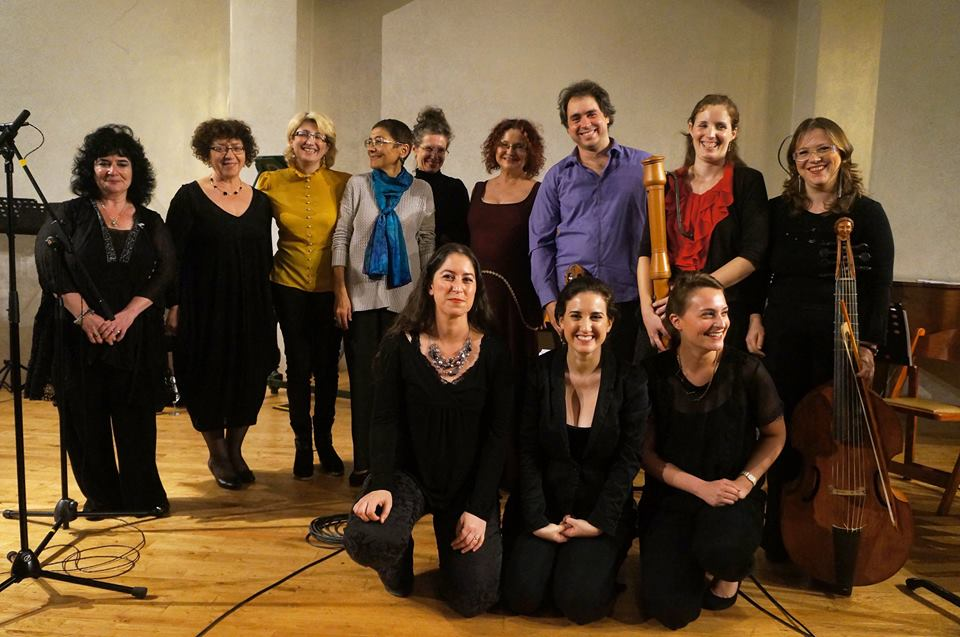
The participants of the annual project of the Israeli Women Composers & performers Forum for 2015, “Sappho’s Poetry”

Several events led to the foundation of the Israeli Women Composers Forum. Among them: the creation of a group of several active women composers, initiated by composer Hagar Kadima, a mutual production of the first women composer concert, “Patches” and the first professional gathering of women composers in Israel on July 7, 2000. Twenty five composers attended the important meeting, in which it was unanimously decided to establish a foundation of Israeli women composers. As the chairwoman of the foundation the composers chose Hagar Kadima- the first Israeli woman composer receiving a PhD in composition (1988, University of California, Santa Barbara). “Patches”, the first concert in Israel dedicated entirely to music composed by women took place at the Tel Aviv Museum of Art in August 2000. At the same month, The Israeli Women Composers Forum became a foundation in Israel.

== The reasons for the organization’s establishment and for its existence today ==
In historical perspective, the first generation of composers in Israel included only one woman, Verdina Shlonsky (1905–1990), who received in 1931 a first prize for a woman composer from the French government for her piece “A Hebrew Poem for Voice & Piano”. Only forty-two years later did she receive recognition also in Israel by getting the Society of Authors, Composers and Music Publishers in Israel award life's work achievement in the field of concert music. Among other women composers not living today, it is worth to mention Yardena Alotin, Mary Even-Or, Chaya Arbel and Noa Blass. Shlonsky and Alotin were the only women composers on which there was written a chapter in the Grove Dictionary of Music and Musicians in 1980. Since Shlonsky and until 2016, only three women composers have received the life's work achievement Award in the field of concert music: Tsippi Fleischer, Betty Olivero and Sara Shoham. Hilat Ben Kenaz has received the Angel Price for composition in the year 2011.

Statistical examination that the Forum has made in its first years have led to the conclusion that while women composers were one third of the whole composers in Israel, their part in broadcasts, commissions, recordings and performances of Israeli Classical Music was nearly 5-10%. Until 2000 there weren't any women lecturers teaching composition. The first woman composer ever working as a composition lecturer, and later as a professor, was Betty Olivero at the Bar-Ilan University. Until 2016, Olivero is the only woman composer owning this academic status. Checking concert programs of music performance groups in Israel (orchestras and ensembles) has shown that out of dozens of Israeli pieces performed in the first sixty years of the Israeli Philharmonic Orchestra, only six were composed by women. Among other performance groups, including contemporary music ensembles, the situation was similar.

It was revealed through the examinations was of dozens of active women composers in the field of concert music, that both the audience and the establishment are not aware of their existence, and hundreds of pieces composed without receiving a performance. “The Israeli Women Composers Forum” was therefore founded due to a strong demand to change this situation, and since it was established, its main goal is to raise the awareness for the existence and art of Israeli women composers.

As of beginning of 2016, The Israeli Women Composers Forum initiated and produced three festivals, thirty-eight concerts, nine lectures and workshops and four radio programs, dedicated entirely to music by Israeli Classical composers and performed in Israel's central venues by the best performers. This activity was one of the main causes for a change in the representation of Israeli women composers in Israeli culture during the first decade of the 21st century. Nowadays, there are more women composers getting public recognition, there is an improvement in the number of performances in recordings and on stage, and more and more women composers are commissioned to write for ensembles and orchestras. Israeli women composers are no longer a rare phenomenon, and they become a bigger part of the local cultural and musical scene. However, this process has not yet been completed, and the Israeli Women Composers and performers Forum continues its activity towards a full representation of women composers in the Israeli Classical Music scene.

The chairwomen of the Israeli Women Composers Forum:

1. Dr. Hagar Kadima (2000- 2004)

2. Hila Tamir-Ostrover (2005- 2006)

3. Sivan Cohen-Elias (2006- 2007)

4. Sigal Goldsovel (2007- 2008)

5. Dganit Elyakim (2008- 2010)

6. Alona Epshtein (2010- 2015)

7. Inbar Solomon (2015- 2016)

8. Marina Toshich (beginning in 2017)

== The activities of the Forum ==
1. Producing annual concerts and festivals dedicated to music composed by women, mainly Israeli women composers.

2. Affiliation of Israeli women composers in other frameworks, such as the Israeli Music Festivities, music festivals, choir workshops and more.

3. Organizing workshops for composers.

4. Providing and passing on information for the Forum's members about competitions, concerts, festivals, suggested projects and other professional opportunities.

5. Networking between women composers and women performers, to initiate and commission new pieces and performing existing pieces.

6. Creating professional collaborations between women composers and women creators in other fields of art, such as dance, theatre, visual art and more. Supporting and promoting the women composers which are members of the forum in their own independent projects.

7. Creating collaborations between women composers and women musicians form other fields, such as Ethnical Music, Pop Music, Jazz and Oriental Music and producing mutual concerts.

8. Initiating and producing mutual projects with women musicians and ensembles worldwide.

== See also ==
- The Israeli Composers Association
- Israel Music Institute
- Israeli Classical Music
