= Op. 138 =

In music, Op. 138 stands for Opus number 138. Compositions that are assigned this number include:

- Reger – Der Mensch lebt und bestehet
- Reger – Nachtlied
- Reger – Unser lieben Frauen Traum
- Schumann – Spanische Liebeslieder
- Shostakovich – String Quartet No. 13
