= Leon Schidlowsky =

Chilean-Israeli composer and painter (1931–2022)

- ליאון שידלובסקי
- Leon Schidlowsky, c. 2000
- Born: Jorge León Schidlowsky Gaete; 21 July 1931; Santiago, Chile
- Died: 10 October 2022 (aged 91); Tel Aviv, Israel
- Education: University of Chile; Nordwestdeutsche Musikakademie
- Occupations: Composer, academic teacher
- Organizations: University of Chile; Tel Aviv University

Jorge León Schidlowsky Gaete (Hebrew: ליאון שידלובסקי; 21 July 1931 – 10 October 2022) was a Chilean and Israeli composer and painter. He wrote music for orchestra, chamber ensemble, choir, and instruments including the piano, violin, cello, flute, mandolin, guitar, harp, organ. About 65 pieces were written in graphic notation. His compositions have been performed in numerous countries, with orchestra conductors including Aldo Ceccato, Clytus Gottwald, Erhard Karkoschka, Herbert Kegel, Lukas Foss, Zubin Mehta and Hermann Scherchen. The scores of his graphic music have been shown in exhibitions such as Staatsgalerie Stuttgart and the Wilhelm-Hack-Museum in Ludwigshafen. Schidlowsky worked as a professor of composition both in Chile and Israel, influencing many students.

== Life and career ==
León Schidlowsky was born in Santiago on 21 July 1931, to a Jewish family. He studied there at the Instituto Nacional from 1940 to 1947, and the piano with Roberto Duncker at the Conservatorio Nacional of the University of Chile from 1942 to 1948, completing with a diploma. He then studied composition with Juan Allende-Blin and Fré Focke, as well as philosophy and psychology. He completed his studies in Germany at the Nordwestdeutsche Musikakademie (later Hochschule für Musik Detmold) in Detmold. He met his future wife there, Susanne they married in 1953.

=== Chile (1954–1968) ===
After his return to Chile in 1954, Schidlowsky became a member of the avant-garde ensemble Grupo Tonus in Santiago and served as its director from 1958 to 1961. This ensemble wanted to spread avant-garde and contemporary music in Chile. In 1956 Schidlowsky produced Nacimiento, considered the first electroacoustic work composed in Latin America. Between 1956 and 1959 he was member of the British Council and between 1956 and 1961 a musical adviser of the pantomime ensemble Grupo Noisvander. He served as director of the music library at the Instituto de Extensión Musical in 1961 and 1962, and as secretary-general of the Asociación Nacional de Compositores from 1961 to 1963. He also served as director-general of the Instituto de Extensión Musical, of the university from 1962 to 1966. In this period the Institute achieved distinction, with the performance of music that had never been played in Chile before, and with the performance of at least one work by a Chilean composer every year. Besides that, a number of orchestral conductors, soloists, and foreign orchestras visited Chile and made a substantial contribution to the musical culture of the country.

In 1964, Schidlowsky was, together with Luigi Dallapiccola and Alberto Ginastera, a member of the jury in a composers' competition in Buenos Aires, Argentina. The same year he took part in the music symposium Latin America and the music of our time (América Latina y la música de nuestros tiempos) in Lima, Peru. In 1965, Schidlowsky was appointed Professor of Composition at the Conservatorio Nacional, serving until 1968. In 1966 he participated in the Inter-American Festival in Washington, D.C., U.S., as well as the Festival Interamericano de Música in Caracas, Venezuela. In 1967, he took part in the Festival of Music from Spain and Latin America, in Madrid, Spain. He participated in the Festival of the Three Worlds in Mérida, Venezuela, in 1968, with lectures and discussions with the composers Krzyztof Penderecki and Luigi Nono. The city of Mérida nominated him a Distinguished Guest of the City. In the same year he received a Fellowship from the John Simon Guggenheim Memorial Foundation in order to write an opera, which he completed in Germany.

=== Israel ===
In 1969, Schidlowsky was appointed Professor for Composition and Music Theory at the Samuel Rubin Academy of Music at the Tel Aviv University. In 1979 he was granted a sabbatical year, which he spent in Hamburg. He has given many conferences in Berlin, Hamburg, Stuttgart, Vienna, Lund, and Zaragoza. Schidlowsky received several fellowships from the German Academic Exchange Service (DAAD), and stayed in Berlin twice for an extended period, where he composed and painted. He served at the university until 2000. Schidlowsky gave courses in composition in several countries; and he has helped to form and influence a whole generation of composers in Israel, including Avraham Amzallag, Chaya Arbel, Mary Even-Or, Rachel Galinne, Betty Olivero, Jan Radzynski, Ruben Seroussi, Ron Weidberg, Moshe Zorman.

=== Personal life ===
Schidlowsky's wife, Susanne Schidlowsky, died in 1999. They had five children (David, Elias, Judith, and twins Yuval and Noam).

Schidlowsky died in Tel Aviv on 10 October 2022, at the age of 91.

== Awards ==
Schidlowsky received various awards for his music, such as at the Festivales de Música Chilena, with works of his being awarded the Chilean Prize CRAV. In 1996 he received the First Prize for his work Absalom in the 60th anniversary competition of the Israel Philharmonic Orchestra.

In 2000 he was awarded the ACUM Prize for his entire oeuvre by the Israel Composers Association. The following year, during a visit to Chile, the Chilean Chamber Orchestra declared him an Honorary Member, the Universidad de Chile appointed him an Honorary Professor in its Arts Faculty, and the Chilean Ministry of Education conferred on him the Orden al Mérito Docente y Cultural Gabriela Mistral with the rank of "Caballero" ("Knight"). He received the Engel Prize for his original work and his research into Jewish music, awarded by the city of Tel Aviv in June 2007. On 21 August 2014, Schidlowsky was awarded the Chilean National Prize for Musical Arts, accompanied by several homages, press articles and interviews in the local press.

== Works ==
Many of Schidlowsky's works make reference to his Jewish-Israeli identity and to the history of the Jewish people, as well as to his interest in history and the political and social situation in Chile and Latin America. There is also in his works a musical response to his personal life and experience, such as the death of his wife Susanne (1999) and his son Elias (2004), or the destiny of many personal and professional friends, or personalities of his time. As an admirer of Arnold Schoenberg´s music, Schidlowsky began his career as a composer in the tradition of the Second Viennese School. His music is also highly influenced by Edgard Varèse, specially on his concern with timbre and freedom of form.

Later he began to use serial techniques, and to experiment with various tonal concepts (atonal, aleatoric, graphic notation), but always on the understanding that music has a deeper significance which transcends absolute art, which can open up a path for a human being to find a way to himself (Schidlowsky: "Art itself has not only one meaning. It includes and encompasses all senses, questions and all answers. I think that art is a way to us.").

His compositions have been performed in numerous countries with orchestra conductors including Aldo Ceccato, Errico Fresis, Clytus Gottwald, Juan Pablo Izquierdo, Erhard Karkoschka, Herbert Kegel, Lukas Foss, Zubin Mehta, Hermann Scherchen, and Ingo Schulz. The scores of his graphic music have been shown in various exhibitions linked to concerts, such as in the Staatsgalerie Stuttgart, Kunsthaus Hamburg, the Wilhelm-Hack-Museum, Ludwigshafen, and the Stadtgalerie Saarbrücken.

Schidlowsky's works include:

- Caupolicán, text by Pablo Neruda, for speaker, mixed chorus, 2 pianos, 6 percussionists
- Tríptico for orchestra
- Kristallnacht, text: fragment from a traditional Jewish prayer, for tenor, male chorus, orchestra
- Invocation, text by the composer, for soprano, speaker, orchestra
- Llaqui, text by Javier Heraud, for speaker and orchestra]
- New York for orchestra
- Epitafio para Hermann Scherchen for orchestra
- Amereida
  1. Llaqui, text by Javier Heraud, for speaker and orchestra
  2. Memento, text by Heraud, for soprano and orchestra
  3. Ecce Homo, text after fragments of Che Guevara), for soprano and orchestra, 1969
- In Eius Memoriam, for orchestra
- Amerindia
  1. Preludio for orchestra
  2. Los heraldos negros, text by César Vallejo), for speaker and orchestra
  3. Sacsahuamán, for orchestra
  4. Era el crepúsculo de la iguana, text by Pablo Neruda, for speaker and orchestra
  5. Yo vengo a hablar, text by Neruda, for speaker and orchestra
- Missa in Nomine Bach, text from the Mass, for mixed chorus and ensemble (8 players)
- Nacht, text by the composer, for mixed chorus
- Lux in Tenebris, for orchestra
- In memoriam Luigi Nono, for viola, cello and double bass
- Arabesque for transverse flute
- Silvestre Revueltas, text by Neruda, for speaker and chamber ensemble
- Prelude to a Drama, for orchestra
- Absalom, for orchestra
- Three Dialogues for 2 violins
- In memoriam Jorge Peña, text by the composer, for speaker and orchestra
- And death shall have no dominion for orchestra
- Job for orchestra
- L´inferno for orchestra
- Partita for cello
- In memoriam György Ligeti for orchestra
- Nocturno, text by Neruda, for narrator and orchestra
- Soledad, text in Quechua and Spanish, for voice, oboe, horn and cello
- Lautaro, text by Neruda, for narrator and orchestra
- Valparaíso, text by Álvaro Gallegos, narrator and orchestra

Examples from his graphic notation music include:

- Kolot for harp
- Trigon for violin or viola, cello and piano
- Actions for Piano'
- Vera la morte, text by Cesare Pavese, for voice and percussion
- Hommage to Picasso, text by Gertrude Stein, for voice
- Tetralog
  1. Music for Piano and Winds
  2. Music for Piano and Strings
  3. Music for Piano and Percussion
  4. Music for Piano and Voice
- Dadayamasong, text by Franz Mehring, for soprano, saxophone, piano and percussion
- Misa Sine Nomine (In Memoriam Víctor Jara)
  1. Bereschít bará elohím et haschamáim weét haáretz text from the Bible, for two mixed choruses and percussion
  2. Kyrie eleison for large mixed chorus
  3. Lied, text by George Grosz, for speaker and organ
  4. Gloria, for large mixed chorus and four gongs (1 player)
  5. Chile, text by the composer, for 20 mixed voices
  6. Credo, for speaker, large mixed chorus, organ and four bass drums (1 player)
  7. Benedictus, for 36 mixed voices and four suspended cymbals (1 player)
  8. Ich komme, text by Vladimir Mayakovsky, for 36 mixed voices
  9. Dona nobis pacem, for large mixed chorus
  10. Babel, text from the Bible, for 6 sopranos, 6 altos, 4 tenors, 4 basses
  11. Epilog, text from the Bible, for speaker, small mixed chorus, large mixed chorus, organ, 4 percussion
- Palindrom for women's chorus
- Am Grab Kafkas, text by Franz Kafka), for women's voice (+ crotales)
- Greise sind die Sterne geworden, texts by Heinrich Heine, Georg Trakl, Else Lasker-Schüler, Mascha Kaléko, Erich Fried, Novalis, and the Bible, for soprano, alto, baritone, speaker, mixed chorus, piano, organ, harpsichord, celesta, 3 percussion
- Deutschland ein Wintermärchen, for chorus, speaker, soloist, piano, and percussion ensemble

Among his numerous works, Schidlowsky also wrote three operas:

- Die Menschen, opera in four acts, libretto by the composer, after Walter Hasenclever
- Der Dybbuk, opera in three acts, libretto by the composer, after S. Ansky
- Before Breakfast, opera in one act, libretto by the composer, after Eugene O'Neill

== Bibliography ==
- Fugellie Videla, Daniela: "La música gráfica de León Schidlowsky: Deutschland ein Wintermärchen (1979) como partitura multimedial". In: Revista Musical Chilena. Año LXVI, Número 218, Santiago de Chile, July to December 2012.
- David Schidlowsky (ed.): "Gráfica musical. León Schidlowsky". RiL editores Santiago de Chile 2012 - ISBN 978-956-284-876-3.
- David Schidlowsky [ed.): "musikalische Grafik - graphic music. León Schidlowsky". Wissenschaftlicher Verlag Berlin, Berlin 2011 - ISBN 978-3-86573-620-8.
- Rüdiger, Wolfgang: "Was wollen wir bauen? Leon Schidlowsky: 'Am Grab Kafkas' für Stimmen und Crotales". In: Stoll, Rolf (ed.): Teamwork! Sprache, Bild, Bewegung, Szene: neue Musik für Schülerensemble. Musik und Bildung Spezial. Praxis Unterricht. Schott Verlag, Mainz 2004.
- Fresis, Errico: "Zwischen Berger und Meer. Der Komponist Leon Schidlowsky". In: Neue Musikzeitung, H. 9, Regensburg 2001.
- Traber, Habakuk: "Schidlowsky, Leon: misa sine nomine". In: Forum Kirchenmusik, 3, Templin, Germany 1999.
- Kube, Michael: "Schidlowsky, Leon: misa sine nomine". In: Neue Zeitschrift für Musik, 3, Mainz 1999.
- Lutzky, Z.: "Leon Schidlowsky: Portrait of a Composer as a Rebel". In: Israel Music Institute News, 91/3, Tel Aviv 1991.
- Cohen, Y. W.: "Neimej smiroth Israel". Tel Aviv 1990, 236-243.
- Maur, Karin von: "Thema Musik – Malerei – Musikalische Graphic". In: Katalog zur Ausstellung Leon Schidlowsky Musikalische Graphik. Staatsgalerie Stuttgart 1979.
- Karkoschka, Erhard: "Zu musikalische Graphik und Leon Schidlowsky's einschlägigen Arbeiten". In: Katalog zur Ausstellung Leon Schidlowsky Musikalische Graphik. Staatsgalerie Stuttgar 1979.
- Leon Schidlowsky Musikalische Graphic,. exhibition catalogue, Staatsgalerie Stuttgart 1979
- Karkoschka, Erhard: "Leon Schidlowsky's "DADAYAmasONG". Eine musikalische Graphik und ihre Interpretation". In: Göllner, Theodor (ed.): Notenschrift und Aufführung. Symposium zur Jahrestagung der Gesellschaft für Musikforschung 1977 in Munich. Tutzing (Hans SchneiderVerlag), 1980. Part of a series: Münchner Veröffentlichungen zur Musikgeschichte vol. 30
- Grebe, María Ester: "León Schidlowsky Gaete. Síntesis de su trayectoria creativa (1952-1968)". In: Revista Musical Chilena 22, H. 104/105, 7-52, Santiago de Chile 1968.
- Compositores de América/Composers of the Americas, Editor: The Pan American Union, Vol. 10, Washington DC 1965.

== Recordings ==
- Obras sinfónicas. Compositores chilenos Vol. 4. Academia Chilena de Bellas Artes. Santiago de Chile 2013. CD 7126709014223
- Leon Schidlowsky zum 75. Geburtstag. Werke von 1952 bis 2005, live from Emmauskirche, Berlin-Kreuzberg, 23/24 September 2005 and 16/17 September 2006. musikart Ingo Schulz, CD 4260031182342
- Greise sind die Sterne geworden. Eine moderne Passion, live recording of the world premiere on 25 March 2000". musikart Ingo Schulz, CD 4012831190634
- Misa sine nomine, live concert on 12 September 1998. CD 4012831190436
