= Clytus Gottwald =

German composer and musicologist (1925–2023)

- Clytus Gottwald, in the 1970s
- Born: 20 November 1925; Ober Salzbrunn, Prussia, Germany
- Died: 18 January 2023 (aged 97); Ditzingen, Baden-Württemberg, Germany
- Education: University of Tübingen; Goethe University Frankfurt
- Occupations: Choral conductor; Musicologist; Music editor; Composer
- Organizations: Paulus-Chor Stuttgart; Schola Cantorum Stuttgart
- Awards: Kulturpreis Baden-Württemberg; Preis der Europäischen Kirchenmusik; Order of Merit of the Federal Republic of Germany

Clytus Gottwald (20 November 1925 – 18 January 2023) was a German composer, conductor, and musicologist who focused on choral music. He was considered by music critics to be a key figure in contemporary choral music, and is known for his arrangements for vocal ensembles of up to 16 voices. He founded and conducted the Schola Cantorum Stuttgart for this music.

== Life and work ==
Gottwald was born in Ober Salzbrunn on 20 November 1925. After military service and being a prisoner of war in the United States, he studied voice with Gerhard Hüsch and choral conducting with Kurt Thomas. As a choir director, he was initially an assistant to Marcel Couraud from 1954 to 1958. From 1958 to 1970 he was cantor at the Paulus-Kirche in Stuttgart, conducting the Paulus-Chor Stuttgart.

Gottwald studied Protestant theology, sociology, and musicology in Tübingen and Frankfurt. In 1961 he completed his dissertation on the Renaissance composer Johannes Ghiselin in Frankfurt. As a musicologist, he edited numerous scholarly catalogues of music manuscripts.

In 1960 Gottwald founded the Schola Cantorum Stuttgart, a vocal ensemble of 16 to 18 professional singers, with a repertoire focused on both classical vocal polyphony as well as contemporary music. They performed more than 80 premieres and first performances of choral works. Among the composers who wrote music for the ensemble are Pierre Boulez, Brian Ferneyhough, Vinko Globokar, Gérard Grisey, Heinz Holliger, Mauricio Kagel, Helmut Lachenmann, György Ligeti, Krzysztof Penderecki, Steve Reich, Dieter Schnebel, and Hans Zender. Notably, Gottwald conducted the Schola Cantorum in a performance of Ligeti's Lux aeterna, which was later used in the Stanley Kubrick film 2001: A Space Odyssey. Gottwald directed the ensemble until its dissolution in 1990.

Gottwald was editor for Neue Musik (contemporary music) for the broadcaster Südfunk Stuttgart from 1967 to 1988.

As a composer, Gottwald specialised in "arranging" classical music from different genres for an a cappella group of up to 16 voices in the style of György Ligeti. He had the initial idea at a workshop of Pierre Boulez, "transcribing" Ravel's Soupir from his Trois poèmes de Mallarmé similarly to Ligeti's use of voices in Lux aeterna. In particular, his arrangement of Gustav Mahler's Rückert song "Ich bin der Welt abhanden gekommen" for voices (1985) was popularized by Swedish choral conductor Eric Ericson and has been performed by many leading choirs. Gottwald arranged works by Alban Berg (Die Nachtigall), Hector Berlioz (Sur les lagunes), Claude Debussy (Les Angelus, Des pas sur la neige), Franz Liszt (Zwei Lieder, two songs), Gustav Mahler (Drei Lieder, three songs), Giacomo Puccini, Maurice Ravel (Soupir), Richard Wagner (Zwei Studien zu "Tristan und Isolde"), Anton Webern (Vier frühe Lieder, four early songs), and Hugo Wolf (four songs including Auf ein altes Bild and Der Gärtner), among others. In his arrangements for voices, he borrowed lyrics freely, for example a combination of a French poem by Rilke with poetry by Mallarmé in his arrangement of Debussy's prelude for piano Des pas sur la neige. His adaptations of Wagner and Mahler were praised: "Gottwald has been truly effective at transferring the romantic orchestra onto the choir". His style of arrangement has been termed "re-create them in a magical choral world".

In 2009 he received the Kulturpreis Baden-Württemberg (Cultural Award of Baden-Württemberg) for his lifetime achievement and in 2012 the Preis der Europäischen Kirchenmusik of Schwäbisch Gmünd, for his contributions to sacred music. He was awarded the Order of Merit of the Federal Republic of Germany in 2014.

Gottwald died on 18 January 2023 at age 97.

== Recordings ==
As choral conductor

- Atelier Schola Cantorum. Neue Vokalmusik. Cadenza 800891–900. 10 CDs.
- Dufay, Ockeghem, Josquin, Brumel, Isaac: Musica Mensurabilis. Bayer Records 100271–274. 4 CDs.
- Nono: Ha venido, Canciones para Silvia (1960). WERGO WER 6038-2, 286 038–2

As composer

- Clytus Gottwald: Transkriptionen. SWR Vokalensemble Stuttgart, Marcus Creed. Carus 83.181.
- Clytus Gottwald: Vokalbearbeitungen. KammerChor Saarbrücken, Georg Grün, Carus 83.182. 2005.
- Choral Arrangements by Clytus Gottwald. The Rudolfus Choir, Ralph Allwood, Signum Classics SIGCD102 2007
- Hymnus an das Leben. KammerChor Saarbrücken, Georg Grün, conductor. Carus 83.458. 2013.

== Publications ==
- Johannes Ghiselin – Johannes Verbonnet: Stilkritische Untersuchung zum Problem ihrer Identität, Breitkopf & Härtel, Wiesbaden 1962, DNB-451628403 (Dissertation, University of Frankfurt 1961) OCLC 1382595
- "Hallelujah" und die Theorie des kommunikativen Handelns. Ausgewählte Schriften. Klett-Cotta, Stuttgart 1998, ISBN 3-608-91923-6
- Rückblick auf den Fortschritt. Eine Autobiographie. Carus-Verlag, Stuttgart 2009, ISBN 978-3-89948-117-4
