= Max Stern =

Max Stern may refer to:

- Max Emanuel Stern (1811–1873), writer, poet and translator
- Max Stern (gallery owner) (1904–1987), German-Canadian arts benefactor, art historian and gallery owner
- Max Stern (businessman) (1898–1982), entrepreneur who established and built the Hartz Mountain Corporation
- Max Stern (poker player), professional poker player, pediatrician and author
- Max Stern (composer) (born 1947), composer, double-bassist and conductor
- Max Stern (artist), German painter and graphic artist
