= Nachtlied (Reger) =

- Motet by Max Reger
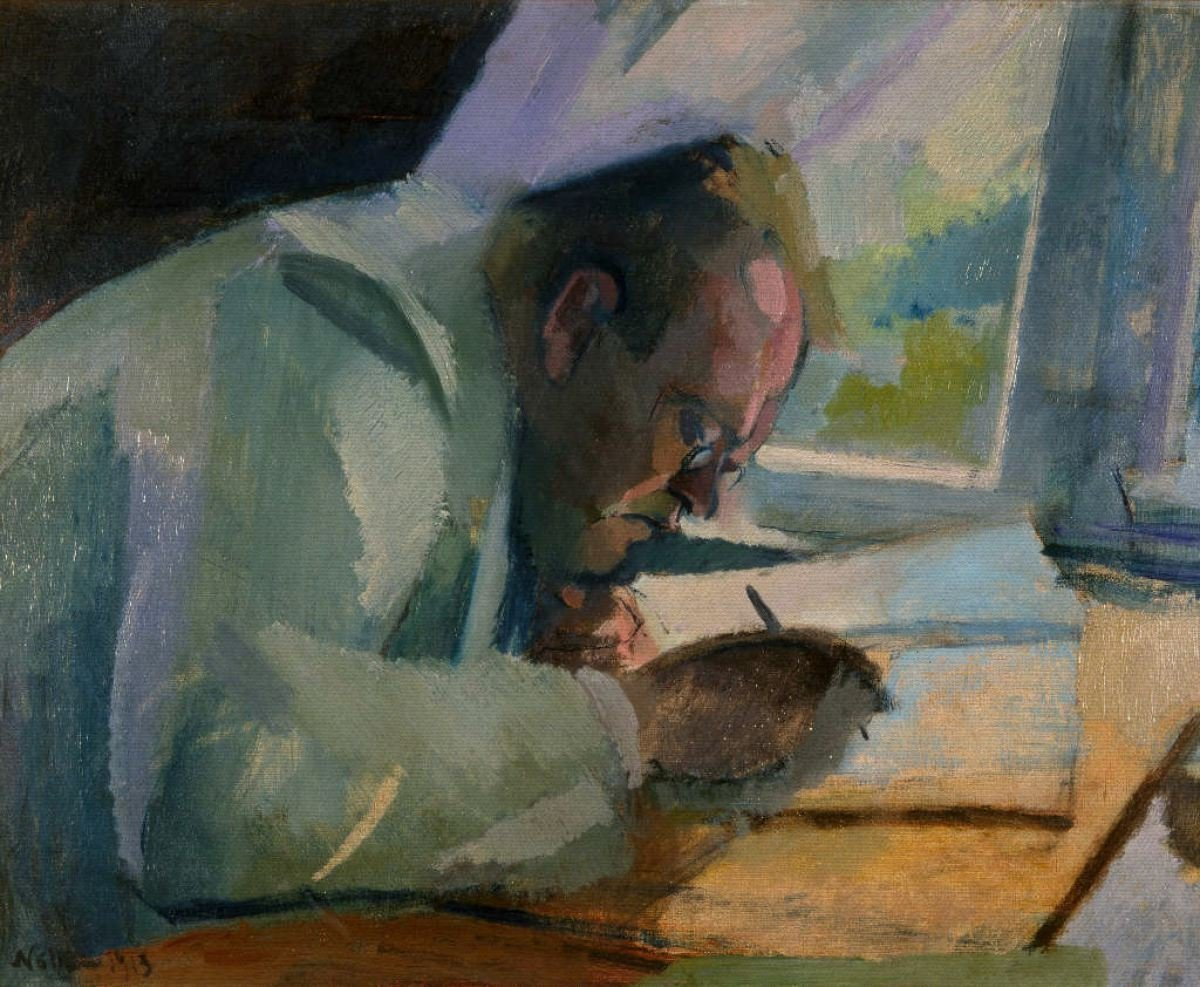
- The composer at work, a painting by Franz Nölken, 1913
- Key: B minor
- Opus: 138, No. 3
- Text: by Petrus Herbert
- Language: German
- Composed: 1914
- Published: 1916
- Scoring: two SATBB choirs

Nachtlied (Night Song) Op. 138, No. 3, is a sacred motet for unaccompanied mixed choir by Max Reger. The German text is a poem by Petrus Herbert, beginning "Die Nacht ist kommen" (The night has come). The piece is in B minor and scored for five voices SATBB. Composed in Meiningen in 1914, it was published in 1916 after Reger's death as the third of Acht geistliche Gesänge (Eight Sacred Songs).

== History ==
Reger composed the motets of Op. 138 in Meiningen in 1914, at the beginning of World War I, when he also worked on Requiem projects in Latin and German. He composed in "new simplicity" eight motets forming Acht geistliche Gesänge (Eight Sacred Songs), Op. 138. He died before finishing to check the Korrekturbögen (proofs) from the publisher. Nachtlied was published by N. Simrock in 1916 as the third of Acht geistliche Gesänge.

1. Der Mensch lebt und bestehet (Matthias Claudius)
2. Morgengesang (Johannes Zwick)
3. Nachtlied (Petrus Herbert)
4. Unser lieben Frauen Traum (anonymous)
5. Kreuzfahrerlied (anonymous)
6. Das Agnus Dei (Nikolaus Decius)
7. Schlachtgesang (anonymous)
8. Wir glauben an einen Gott (anonymous)

== Text and music ==
The German text is a poem in three stanzas of seven lines each by Petrus Herbert.

Die Nacht ist kommen,
Drin wir ruhen sollen;
Gott walt's, zum Frommen
Nach sein'm Wohlgefallen,
Dass wir uns legen
In sein'm G'leit und Segen,
Der Ruh' zu pflegen.

Treib, Herr, von uns fern
Die unreinen Geister,
Halt die Nachtwach' gern,
Sei selbst unser Schutzherr,
Schirm beid Leib und Seel'
Unter deine Flügel,
Send' uns dein' Engel!

Lass uns einschlafen
Mit guten Gedanken,
Fröhlich aufwachen
Und von dir nicht wanken;
Lass uns mit Züchten
Unser Tun und Dichten
Zu dein'm Preis richten!

The poem with a rhyming scheme of ABABCCC reflects in the first stanza that night has come as a time to rest in peace, protected and blessed by God. The second stanza addresses God, praying for keeping away unclean spirits and protection for both body and soul by a guardian angel. The third stanza expects joyful rising the next morning, dedication all work and thoughts to God's praise. Reger set the motet for five voices (with divided bass) in B minor in common time, marked "Ziemlich langsam" (Rather slowly), mostly in homophony, reminiscent of chorales by Johann Sebastian Bach. All three stanzas are set differently, with subtle dynamic changes to follow the meaning of the text. The first stanza is mostly quiet, illustrating the rest at night. The second stanza begins forte with a prayer for protection from evil spirits. A call to send "dein Engel" (your angel) is again softer. The third stanza reflects pianissimo "Let us fall asleep with good thoughts", then stronger "awake happily", finally, ever broadening, the prayer that all we do may be to God's praise.

== Selected recordings ==
The motet has been recorded as part of the complete motets Op. 138, for example by the NDR Chor conducted by Hans-Christoph Rademann. It appears in a 1995 collection, combining Reger's Eight Sacred Songs with Six Sacred Songs by Hugo Wolf, Regers O Tod, wie bitter bist du from Op. 110, and Anton Webern's Entflieht auf leichten Kähnen, Op. 2, performed by the KammerChor Saarbrücken, conducted by Georg Grün. The song was chosen for a 2008 collection The Best of The King's Singers.
