= Jan Radzynski =

Polish-American composer and music professor

- יאן רדזינסקי
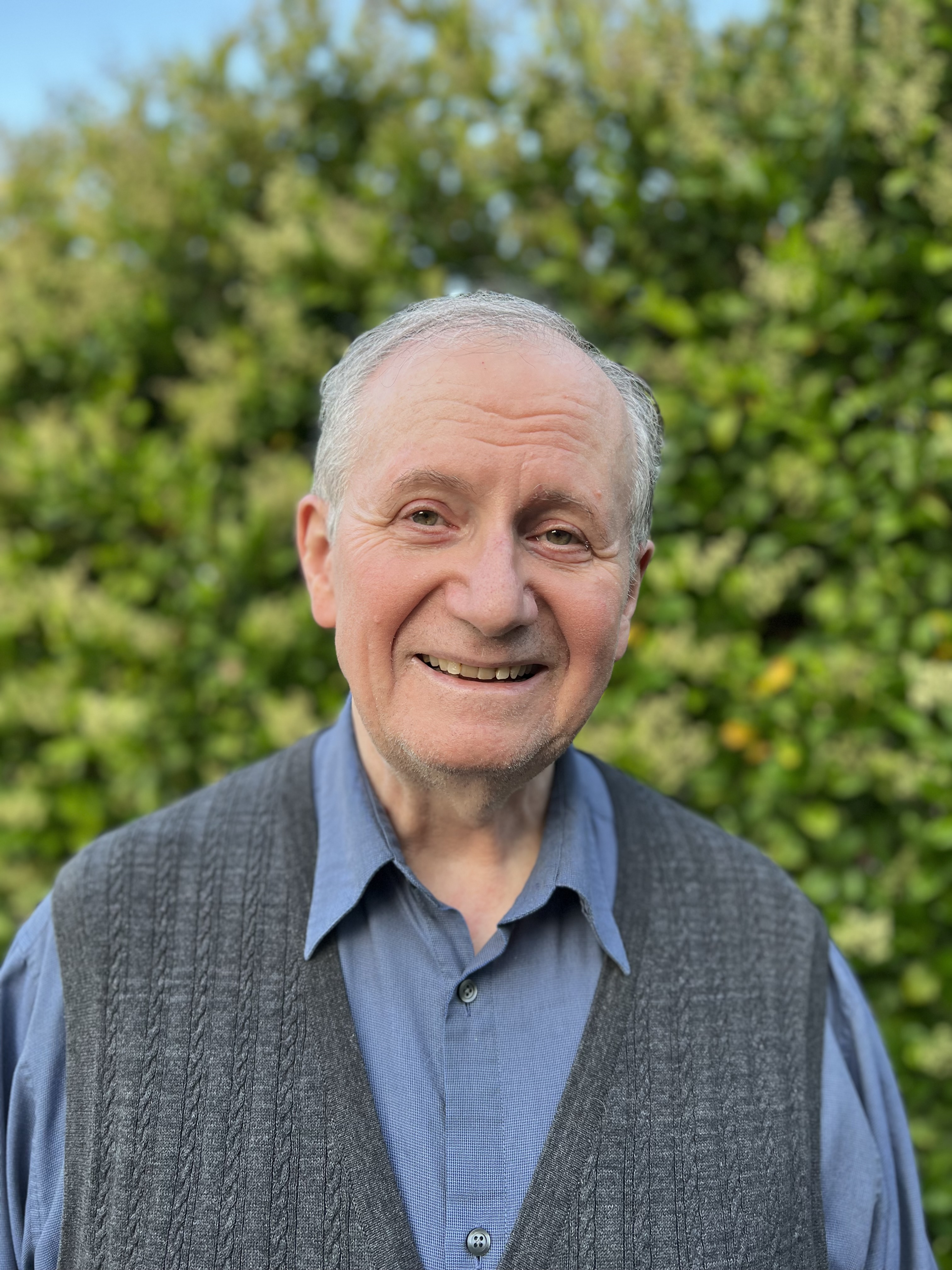
- Born: 1950 (age 75–76); Warsaw, Poland
- Education: Tel Aviv University, Yale University
- Occupations: Composer, professor
- Known for: Contemporary classical music
- Children: David Radzynski
- Website: janradzynski.com

Jan Radzynski (Hebrew: יאן רדזינסקי; born June 18, 1950) is a Polish-born Israeli-American composer.

== Early life and education ==
Jan Radzynski was born in Warsaw, Poland in 1950 to a musical family. His mother supported and guided his early piano studies, and one of his great-grandfathers had served as an army bandmaster in the Austro-Hungarian military before World War I. Radzynski left Poland in 1969, settling in Israel where he pursued studies in composition and theory at Tel Aviv University's Rubin Academy of Music under Leon Schidlowsky. He earned diplomas in cello and composition in 1974 and later continued his studies in the United States. At Yale University, he worked with renowned composers Krzysztof Penderecki and Jacob Druckman, completing his master's degrees in 1979 and 1980, and a Doctor of Musical Arts (DMA) in 1984.

== Career ==
After completing his doctoral studies, he joined the faculty at Yale University, where he taught composition from 1980 until 1994. In 1994, he became a professor at Ohio State University, where he has also been affiliated with the Melton Center for Jewish Studies.

Radzynski's work is marked by a fusion of Eastern European Jewish musical elements, Middle Eastern heterophony, and Western classical traditions. His compositions have been performed by major orchestras such as The Cleveland Orchestra, Cracow Philharmonic, and the Israel Philharmonic Orchestra, among others.

His notable works include Concerto for Cello and Orchestra (1990/92), which garnered international recognition, and Serenade for Strings (2000). Other significant works include Time's Other Beat for symphony orchestra and David, a symphony in one movement.

Over his career, Radzynski has received numerous awards, including two ASCAP Standard Awards (1989, 1997), the Mellon Fellowship (1985), and the Distinguished Scholar Award from Ohio State University (1996). He was also awarded a Creative Work and Research Grant from the Rothschild Foundation in 1995, as well as various faculty grants and residencies in Israel and Switzerland.

== Personal life ==
Jan Radzynski settled in the United States after completing his studies and has maintained dual academic and creative careers. He is the father of David Radzynski, a violinist and former concertmaster of The Cleveland Orchestra and the Israel Philharmonic Orchestra. Radzynski has continued to influence contemporary music through both his compositions and his teaching at Ohio State University.

== Awards ==
- Two ASCAP Standard Awards (1989, 1997)
- Mellon Fellowship (1985)
- Morse Fellowship
- Distinguished Scholar Award, The Ohio State University (1996)
- Frederick W. Hilles Publication Grant
- Yale University Griswold Research Grants
- Summer Residency at the Foundation Artist's House, Boswil, Switzerland (1983)
- Residency at Mishkenot Sha'ananim, Israel (1995)
- Creative Work and Research Grant from the Rothschild Foundation (1995)
- Individual Artist Grants from the Connecticut Commission on the Arts and Ohio Arts Council
