= Bart Berman =

Dutch-Israeli pianist and composer (born 1938)

Bart Berman (Hebrew: ברט ברמן; born 29 December 1938) is a Dutch-Israeli pianist and composer, best known as an interpreter of Franz Schubert and 20th-century music.

== Career ==
Bart Berman studied piano with Jaap Spaanderman at a predecessor of the Conservatorium van Amsterdam and complemented his piano education with Theo Bruins and a master class by Alfred Brendel. In 1978 he moved to Israel.

As a soloist Berman was awarded the Dutch Prize of Excellence, the first prize in the Gaudeamus Competition for interpreters of contemporary music, the Friends of the Concertgebouw Award and four first prizes at competitions for young soloists. He has performed in Israel, Europe and the United States, as a soloist and in chamber music. Berman was a soloist with many Dutch and Israeli orchestras and has recorded for radio and television.

Collaborations included those with flautist Abbie de Quant (since 1970), Duo 4 with pianist Meir Wiesel, the Tamar Piano Trio with violinist Itzhak Segev and cellist Louis Rowen, as well as ensembles with several vocalists among whom Bat-Sheva Zeisler. Past partnerships include Duo Beer Sheva with the late pianist Sara Fuxon, Ensemble M, and Negev Baroque. From 2004 until 2008 Berman accompanied the remake of Hanoch Levin's satirical cabaret You, Me and the Next War, in 2007 he was the pianist and musical director of Schubert Plus, An Operatic Episode in Two Acts, and during 2011 to 2015 he was a guest soloist with the Zamir Quartet. In 2014 he launched a new program for 4 pianists at 2 pianos, based on Duo 4.

Berman taught piano at the conservatoires of Rotterdam and Arnhem and was an editor of the Israel Music Institute. Among his many students are Cleem Determeijer, Kees van Eersel, Margriet Ehlen, Dror Elimelech, Gerard Houtman, and Matthijs Verschoor.

Berman studied composition with Bertus van Lier and Wouter van den Berg. He has composed many original works, including cadenzas to all piano concerti by Haydn, Mozart and Beethoven and second piano parts to be played alongside original compositions by Muzio Clementi and Daniel Steibelt. Most noted are his completions to Schubert's unfinished piano sonatas and J. S. Bach's Art of Fugue.

== Discography ==
Participation	Albums	Collections
Piano solo	Bart Berman, Piano: Vriend, Hekster, Loevendie, De Vries, Kleinbussink (1978); Franz Schubert: (Un)finished Piano Sonatas (1997, 2021); Franz Schubert: Early Sonatas (2022)	Chaya Arbel: Works (1998); Ben-Zion Orgad: Tonegestures (2006); Max Stern: Nebhel & Kinnor (2007)
Piano duos	Franz Schubert: Music for Piano Four Hands (1983, 1988, 1991); Kibbutz Composers: Piano Music for Two and Four Hands (1985); Duo 4: Live 1995 (1996)	Piano Masterpieces (1989); Clair de Lune & Other Moonlit Classics (1989); David Ori: Musical Portrait (1997); Tsippi Fleischer: Israel at 50 (1999); Gabriel Iranyi: Bird of Wonder (2001); Max Stern: Song of Ascents (2012)
Various small ensembles	Hanoch Levin: You, Me and the Next War (2004)	Meir Mindel: Tamar (1990); Frank Martin: Chamber Music (1991); Rachel Galinne: Uneginotai Nenagen (1999); Chaya Arbel: More Works (2003); Tamar Berman: Crossing Over (2023)
Various large ensembles	Sergei Prokofiev: Romeo and Juliet (1976)	Peter Schat: To You (1974); George Antheil: Ballet Mécanique (1977, 1977); Sergei Prokofiev: Favourite Orchestral Suites (1994); George Antheil: Complete Philips Recordings (2022)

== Notable performances ==
1960s and 1970s	1980s and 1990s	2000s and 2010s
Professional debut, Dieren, Netherlands (1960); 8th Hispanic Days, Rotterdam (1961); Youth Festival, Velp (1966); University of Burgundy, Dijon (1968); Institut Néerlandais, Paris (1968); Gaudeamus Contest, Rotterdam (1970); Musical Fall of Como (1970); Östersund Festival, Sweden (1972); Holland Festival, Amsterdam (1972); Dutch Music Days, London (1973); Dortmund, Germany (1973); Holland Festival, Amsterdam (1974); ISCM International Music Days, Rotterdam (1974)	ISCM World Music Days, Tel Aviv (1980); Bach Marathon, Tel Aviv (1981); George Crumb Retrospective, Tel Aviv (1983); Ralph Shapey Workshop, Jerusalem (1984); Henri Pousseur Workshop, Jerusalem (1986); György Ligeti Workshop, Jerusalem (1987); Israel Festival, Jerusalem (1987); Rhine Music Days, Düsseldorf (1987); Voice of Music Festival in Upper Galilee, Kfar Blum (1989); Israel Festival, Jerusalem (1994); Musica Da Camera Festival, Tel Aviv (1997); 2nd International Ethnomusicology Conference, Jerusalem (1998)	From IJ to Sea, Amsterdam (2001); International Opera Workshop, Tel Aviv (2001); University of Chicago, Illinois (2002); Schloss Sinzig, Germany (2003); Northwestern University, Evanston (2004); Isradrama Festival, Tel Aviv (2006); Schloss Sinzig, Germany (2006); Voice of Music Festival in Upper Galilee, Kfar Blum (2007); YMCA Festival, Jerusalem (2007); Schloss Sinzig, Germany (2008); The Other Schubert, Tel Aviv (2010); French Autumn Festival, Tel Aviv and Tiberias (2011); Israeli Music Celebration, Ashdod (2014); Die Kunst der Fuge, City Hall, Baden-Baden, Germany (2015); Schubertiade, Zikhron Ya'akov (2016)

== Composition ==
- Farce of the Cow (1956), theater music for a 1612 play by Gerbrand Bredero
- Hans, the Bell Ringer (1956), theater music for a 1923 play by Johan Fabricius
- Duo in Mediterranean Style for violin and viola (1957)
- Christmas Song on a text by Bertus van Lier for choir a cappella (1957)
- Allegro for Orchestra (1958)
- Israeli Sonatina for piano (1958)
- String Quartet (1958)
- Four Melodies for piano (1960, revised 1980)
- Three New Canons on the Royal Theme of J. S. Bach: The Musical Offering (1978)
- Etude for the Fifths for piano (1992)
- Birthday Bunch for piano (1994)
- Film music for The Staircase for piano (1995)
- Variations and Fugue on a theme by Nikolai Medtner for piano (2009)
- Dayenu Fantasy for piano (2014)

=== Cadenzas ===
- Castiglioni: Arabeschi for flute, piano and orchestra (1974)
- The Beethoven piano concerti (1966–1990)
- The Mozart solo, double and triple piano concerti (1970–1990)
- The Haydn piano concerti (1970–1990)

=== Completions ===
- J. S. Bach: The Art of Fugue (1970)
- Schubert: Unfinished Piano Sonatas (1976–1990)
- Mozart: Sonata for Keyboard Four-hands in G major, K. 357 (1991)
- Glinka: Sonata in D minor for viola and piano (1999)
- Beethoven: Romance in E minor ("Romance Cantabile") for piano, flute, bassoon, and orchestra, Hess 13 (2001)

=== Piano parts ===
- Second Piano Part for Daniel Steibelt: Sonatina Opus 33 in C (1981)
- Right Hand Piano Part for J. S. Bach: Sonatas in E minor and E major (1988)
- Second Piano Part for Clementi: Six Sonatinas Opus 36 (1995)
