= Der Mensch lebt und bestehet =

- Motet by Max Reger
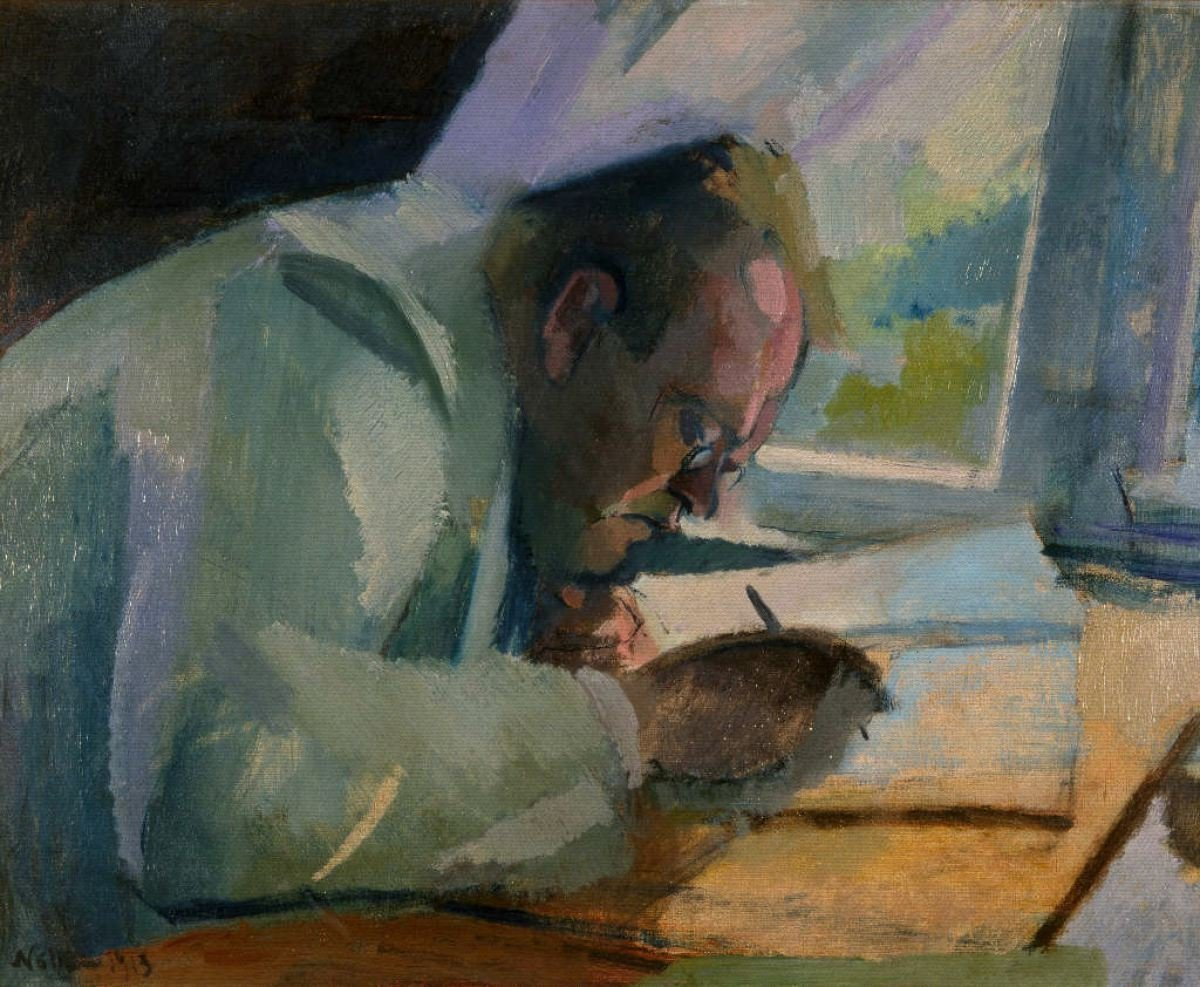
- The composer at work, a painting by Franz Nölken, 1913
- Key: A minor
- Opus: 138, No. 1
- Text: by Matthias Claudius
- Language: German
- Composed: 1914
- Published: 1916
- Scoring: two SATB choirs

Der Mensch lebt und bestehet, Op. 138, No. 1, is a sacred motet for unaccompanied mixed choir by Max Reger. The German text is a poem by Matthias Claudius, beginning with "Der Mensch lebt und bestehet nur eine kleine Zeit" (Man liveth and endureth but a short time). The piece is in A minor and scored for eight voices in two choirs SATB. Composed in Meiningen in 1914, it was published in 1916 after Reger's death as the first of Acht geistliche Gesänge (Eight Sacred Songs).

== History ==
Reger composed the motets of Op. 138 in Meiningen in 1914, at the beginning of World War I, when he also worked on Requiem projects in Latin and German. Inspired by Bach's motets, he had composed "extended a cappella choral settings", such as Geistliche Gesänge, Op. 110, dedicated to the Thomanerchor, with challenging double fugues. In contrast, he composed eight motets forming Acht geistliche Gesänge, Op. 138, as a master of "new simplicity". Reger died before completing his review of the Korrekturbögen (proofs) from the publisher. The proofs were next to his bed when he was found dead in a hotel in Leipzig on 11 May 1916. Der Mensch lebt und bestehet was published by N. Simrock in 1916 as the first of Acht geistliche Gesänge.

1. Der Mensch lebt und bestehet (Matthias Claudius)
2. Morgengesang (Johannes Zwick)
3. Nachtlied (Petrus Herbert)
4. Unser lieben Frauen Traum (anonymous)
5. Kreuzfahrerlied (anonymous)
6. Das Agnus Dei (Nikolaus Decius)
7. Schlachtgesang (anonymous)
8. Wir glauben an einen Gott (anonymous)

== Text and music ==
The German text is the beginning of a short poem titled Motett by Matthias Claudius.

Der Mensch lebt und bestehet
nur eine kleine Zeit;
und alle Welt vergehet
mit ihrer Herrlichkeit.
Es ist nur Einer ewig und an allen Enden,
und wir in seinen Händen.

The poem reflects how short-lived and transient are both the human existence and the splendor of the world (sic transit gloria mundi), in contrast to God who is eternal and omnipresent. The shorter last line states that we are in his hands.

The piece in A minor is scored for eight voices in two choirs SATB. It is in alla breve time and marked "Ziemlich langsam" (rather slowly). Reger repeats the first two lines of the text, with modified music the second time, arriving at a structure of A – A' – B. The B section is set in contrast in A major, marked Etwas bewegter (A bit more moving). Within this line, only one word is repeated and intensified: seinen, ending on "his, his hands".

For the first two measures, Reger presents only the words Der Mensch (The Human being). A choir of five lower voices (alto 1 and all men's voices) sings the two words on the same homophonic chords, marked pianissimo (pp). While they still hold the chord, the upper voices enter similarly, marked even softer (ppp). After the static beginning, the rest of the first line is presented in steady slow motion of half-notes. After a rest, the second line, mentioning the world and its perishing, is sung in homophony by all voices, now mp and growing in intensity, led by the first soprano with a melody that first rises and then falls on vergehet (perishes). The perished but remembered Herrlichkeit (splendor) is illustrated mf and in high register. After a long rest, the whole text is repeated, with minor but notable variations: first and second choir switch; the signal Der Mensch is repeated once more by three upper voices while the others continue the text; some voices repeat the first line in imitation while others continue with the second line, also in imitation, creating a dense texture; the climax on Herrlichkeit is now f, reduced in downward motion of the soprano melody to ppp. After another long rest, the contrasting concept of an eternal being is developed in mostly homophony, growing from mf to f on ewig (eternal), and the final und wir in seinen, seinen Händen (and we in his, his hands) reaches ff when the word Händen begins, which is then developed over two measures, slowing down and diminishing, but with individual melodies full of rhythmical details in all voices.

== Selected recordings ==
The motet has been recorded as part of the complete motets Op. 138, for example by the NDR Chor conducted by Hans-Christoph Rademann. It was chosen for the title of a 1995 collection, combining Reger's Eight Sacred Songs with Six Sacred Songs by Hugo Wolf, Regers O Tod, wie bitter bist du from Op. 110, and Anton Webern's Entflieht auf leichten Kähnen, Op. 2, performed by the KammerChor Saarbrücken, conducted by Georg Grün.
