= Matthias Rettner =

German culture manager and theatre maker (born 1963)

Matthias Rettner (born April 9, 1963) is a German culture manager and theatre maker.

== Life and career ==
Following classical vocal training, including three years in the master class led by Dietrich Fischer-Dieskau at the Hochschule der Künste Berlin (Berlin University of the Arts), he performed mainly as a concert singer in the 1990s, e.g. in a duo with pianist Eric Schneider. Together they won an award at the "Internationaler Wettbewerb für Liedkunst" in Stuttgart in 1990 and recorded various "Lied" programmes for radio broadcasters.

In the late 1990s, he applied his efforts to increasingly cross-genre projects which could no longer be assigned to any one traditional category. In 1999 he joined the Action Theatre PAN.OPTIKUM, a theatre ensemble based in Berlin and led by Sigrun Fritsch and Ralf Buron with a focus on performances in public venues.

Within the PAN.OPTIKUM context, he developed concepts to reposition action theatre and went on to drive the productions in the years to follow. Under his leadership the ensemble performed at theatre festivals in Santiago de Chile, Teatro a Mil, at the Festival Internacional de Teatro de Caracas, at the Festival Internacional de Teatro de Bogotá and at the Festival Internacional Cervantino in Mexico. He continued with his model of blending and interpenetration of different styles and genres with productions for the RuhrTriennale in 2004, "Orpheus", a commissioned production for Gerard Mortier, and the German premiere of the Rome section of the Philip Glass opera "The CIVIL warS" in September 2004.

He has been working with Frankfurt-based concept artist and designer Peter Zizka since 2003 and provided the artist’s installation called "Virtuelles Minenfeld" ("Virtual Minefield") with its first presentation platform with "The CIVIL WarS". He received the Culture Prize Baden-Württemberg with the ensemble in 2005.

== Productions ==
2001 IL CORSO, premiere at the Kunstfest Weimar; 2004 ORPHEUS, premiere at the RuhrTriennale in the Jahrhunderthalle Bochum; 2004 The CIVIL warS, premiere at the Stadthalle Freiburg, a co-production with the Freiburg Theatre; 2005 BallGefühl, premiere in Iserlohn; 2007 Medea: Voices, premiere at the Freiburg Theatre, co-production with the Freiburg Theatre; 2008 Carmina Burana, premiere in the Roman amphitheatre Kaiseraugst, a co-production with the Theatre Basel.
