= Dror Elimelech =

Israeli psychiatrist, psychotherapist, poet, and composer

- דרור אלימלך
- Born: 1956 (age 69–70); Israel
- Education: Studied composition with Sergiu Natra; Studied piano with Bart Berman, Ruth Hilman, Pnina Salzman
- Occupations: Psychiatrist; Psychotherapist; Poet; Composer
- Awards: Israeli Prime Minister Prize for Hebrew writers (2002)
- Musical career
- Genre: Contemporary classical music
- Instrument: Piano

Dror Elimelech (Hebrew: דרור אלימלך; born 1956 in Israel) is an Israeli psychiatrist, psychotherapist, poet, composer, and performer of contemporary classical music.

Elimelech studied composition with Sergiu Natra and piano with Bart Berman, Ruth Hilman, and Pnina Salzman. He composes for a wide range of instrumental settings. His musical style is experimental with avant-garde influences. Elimelech established and organized several concert series in Israel for contemporary music. In 1994 he published a CD by the name of Trans.

Elimelech won the Israeli Prime Minister Prize for Hebrew writers in 2002. He has published eight books of his poetry.
