= Chaya Arbel =

Israeli composer

Chaya Arbel (Hebrew: חיה ארבל; June 8, 1921 – December 14, 2006) was an Israeli composer. She is one of Israel's best known female classical composers and the recipient of the ACUM Prize.

== Biography ==
Arbel studied piano and composition in Germany, until she immigrated to the British mandate of Palestine (1936), where she worked in agriculture at kibbutz HaMa'apil. Only 25 years later, Arbel resumed her composition studies, with professor Leon Schidlowsky. Arbel remained a kibbutz member for the rest of her life. She won the ACUM Prize for Dialogue for Clarinet and Orchestra.

== Published works ==
=== Orchestra ===
- 19?? Concerto for cello and string orchestra (IMC)
- 1983 A Toy Symphony Here and Now for string orchestra, toys and percussion (IMC)
- 1984 Lament for string orchestra (IMI, IMC)
- 1990 Dialogue for clarinet and chamber orchestra (IMI, IMC)
- 1996 For Old Times Sake for orchestra (IMC)
- 2003 Third Tale for string orchestra (IMI, IMIC)

=== Large ensemble ===
- 1992 The Diary of Anne Frank, for string quartet, piano and mezzo-soprano (Neue Musik)
- 1992 Agada for woodwinds, brass and percussion (IMC)
- 1995 Conzertino for double bass solo, winds and percussion (IMC)
- 1996 Time Beats, Quartet for harp, flute, viola and percussion (IMC)

=== Small ensemble ===
- 19?? Roots, Ballad in 2 parts for violin, cello and piano (IMC)
- 1986 Drama for clarinet, cello and piano (IMC)
- 1987 Roundarounds for tuba and piano (IMC)
- 1990 In Memory of Our Soldiers for trombone and piano (IMC)
- 1991 The Turtles Voice for horn, violin, cello and piano (IMC)
- 1995 Intermezzo for viola and piano (IMC)

=== Solo instruments ===
- 1984 Lament for piano (IMC)
- 1985 Remembrance for piano (IMC)
- 1983 Fantasia for violin solo (IMC)

== Discography ==
=== Albums ===
- 1998 Works, by various artists
- 2003 More Works, by various artists (ICL)

=== In anthologies ===
- 1985 Kibbutz Composers: Piano Music for Two and Four Hands, pianist Bart Berman on a record by Duo Beer Sheva (Jerusalem)
- 2003 Psanterin, CD 6 out of 9, by pianist Michal Tal (IMC)
