= Rachel Galinne =

Israeli composer (born 1949)

Rachel Galinne (Rachel S. Gluchowicz; Hebrew: רחל גלעין; born 7 February 1949) is an Israeli composer.

== Life and career ==
Rachel Galinne was born in Stockholm, Sweden. She graduated from Uppsala University with a Bachelor of Arts degree in 1974 and then studied composition with Leon Schidlowsky at the Rubin Academy at Tel Aviv University, where she graduated with a Bachelor of Music degree in 1984 and a Master of Music degree in 1988. She also studied composition with Witold Lutoslawski in France, and attended Darmstadt.

After completing her studies, she worked as a composer. In 1994 she received the Prime Minister's Prize for Composers and the ACUM Prize.

== Discography ==
Galinne has issued the following CD albums available at the Israel Music Institute:

- Rachel Galinne (1999)
- Prisms (2004)
- I Will Walk in the Land of the Living (2008)
- A Voice Crieth in the Wilderness (2011)

== Works ==
Selected works include:

- Islossning, 2 pianoforte, percussion, 1984
- Cycles, 1986
- Concerto, 2 pianoforte, orchestra, 1988
- Trio, cl, va, pianoforte, 1989
- Symphony no.1, 1996
- Symphony no.2, 1998
- Uneginotai Nenagen [And We Shall Sing my Song of Praise] (Isaiah xxxviii), 16-pt mixed chorus, 1993
- Amitai in memoriam, for string quartet
- And They Shall Study War no More, for soprano, horn & piano
- Aphrodite, for flute solo
- Chamber Symphony, for chamber ensemble
- Chen, for percussion solo & chamber ensemble
- Dybuk, for Solo Clarinet
- Ethalech be'artsot hachayim (I Will Walk in the Land of the Living)for soprano and chamber ensemble
- Fugue for String Quartet
- Lo Yisa Goy el Goy Cherev, Nation Shall Not Lift up Sword Against Nation, for Vocal & Instrumental Ensemble
- Sonatat ha-Or (Sonata of Light), for Violin and Piano
- The Story of Bellet for tenor & three instruments
- Trio Energico for violin, cello and piano
- Kol Kore Bamidbar (A Voice Crieth in the Wilderness) for violin and piano
- Mahleriana for violin, viola, cello and piano
