= Ludger Lohmann =

- Born: 1954; Herne, Germany
- Occupation(s): Organist, Professor
- Instrument: Organ

Ludger Lohmann (born 1954 in Herne) is a highly acknowledged organist.

Lohmann studied school and church music, musicology, philosophy and geography in Cologne. He studied organ with Wolfgang Stockmeier and harpsichord with Hugo Ruf. He took private lessons with Anton Heiller in Vienna and Marie-Claire Alain in Paris. From 1979 to 1984, Lohmann taught organ at the Hochschule für Musik und Tanz Köln. From 1983 to 2020, he was Professor of Organ at State University of Music and Performing Arts Stuttgart and for 25 years organist at Stuttgart Cathedral. Iveta Apkalna has been one of his students.

Lohmann was a guest professor at University of Hartford Hartt School, US and senior researcher in the Göteborg Organ Art Center at the University of Gothenburg, Sweden. He is also jury member of many international competitions and teacher in international master classes.

Lohmann is specialist in Early Music and Romantic Organ Literature.

He lives in Lindau on Lake Constance.

== Awards ==
- 1979 ARD International Music Competition in Munich
- 1982 Grand Prix de Chartres
- 2023 Preis der Europäischen Kirchenmusik

== Writings ==
- Rampe, Siegbert; Sackmann, Dominik (2000). Bachs Orchestermusik (in German). Kassel: Bärenreiter-Verl. ISBN 3-7618-1345-7.

=== Dissertation ===
- Lohmann, Ludger (2015). Die Artikulation auf den Tasteninstrumenten des 16. - 18. Jahrhunderts (in German). Stuttgart: Palmer Projekt. ISBN 978-3-00-049944-9.
