= Kulturpreis Baden-Württemberg =

Award

Kulturpreis Baden-Württemberg (Cultural Award of Baden-Württemberg) is an award given in the German state of Baden-Württemberg.

The foundation "Kulturpreis Baden-Württemberg", founded in 2002, awards the prize of Euro 25,000 biannually for various cultural achievements connected to the state. Each time, the prize is split in a Hauptpreis (main prize) and a Förderpreis (supporting prize). Excellent achievements are considered in the field visual arts, performing arts, film/new media, literature, and music.

In 2003, the first prizes were awarded to the artist Wolfgang Laib and the foundation Kunststiftung Baden-Württemberg.

In 2005, in the field of the performing arts, the Hauptpreis was shared by the action theater PAN.OPTIKUM and the Balthasar Neumann Chor & Ensemble, choreographer Marco Goecke won the Förderpreis.

In 2007, in the field of literature, José F. A. Oliver won the Hauptpreis for his lyric, Edgar Harwardt the Förderpreis for his literary performances "Kunst, wo man sie nicht vermutet" (art where you don't expect it).

In 2009, the topic was music. Clytus Gottwald won the Hauptpreis, the Förderpreis went to two choirs, the chorale Christophorus Kantorei and the Ulmer Spatzen, a choir of children and young people.

In 2011, new media were the topic. Walter Giers was awarded the Hauptpreis, Pipo Tafel the Förderpreis.
