= Missa Sine Nomine (Schidlowsky) =

1977 composition by Leon Schidlowsky

Misa Sine Nomine
- Mass by Leon Schidlowsky
- Text: Order of Mass, verses from the Hebrew Bible, texts by George Grosz, Schidlowsky, and Vladimir Mayakovsky
- Language: Hebrew; Latin; Spanish; German
- Composed: 1977
- Dedication: In Memoriam Víctor Jara
- Performed: 1980 Musikhochschule Hamburg
- Movements: 11
- Vocal: speaker; choirs up to 36 voices
- Instrumental: organ; percussion

The Misa Sine Nomine (Note: Sources disagree as to the correct spelling of the first word, which means "mass". According to Schidlowsky's website, as well as several other sources, it is spelled misa in the composer's native Spanish. The rest of the title is in Latin, in which the word is spelled missa; this is the spelling used by the work's publisher. The full title of the work is Misa Sine Nomine (In Memoriam Víctor Jara).) (Mass Without Name) is a 1977 musical work for narrator, mixed choirs with up to 36 voices, organ, and percussion by Leon Schidlowsky. It was composed in memory of Chilean folk singer and human rights activist Víctor Jara. The work is a setting of parts of the mass ordinary juxtaposed with Biblical passages in Hebrew, and texts in other languages by various contemporary authors, including by the composer himself. The composition is in eleven movements and utilizes different groupings of performers in each. The score uses graphic notation. The movements, which can be performed separately, are meant to be accompanied by visual projections. It was first performed in Hamburg in 1980.

== History ==
Leon Schidlowsky composed Misa Sine Nomine in 1977 in memory of Víctor Jara. Jara was a Chilean folk singer who was one of the leaders of the "Nueva canción chilena" movement, as well as a poet, and human rights activist; he was arrested on 12 September 1973, the day after the coup d'état against Salvador Allende. He was held at the Estadio Chile, where he was tortured and murdered by the Chilean military.

For texts, Schidlowsky juxtaposed parts of the mass ordinary (Kyrie, Gloria, Credo, Benedictus and Dona nobis pacem) with texts by George Grosz, himself, and Vladimir Mayakovsky, beginning and ending with texts from the Bible in Hebrew. The score uses graphic notation. The movements can be performed separately, and are meant to be accompanied by visual projections.

The first performance was given in 1980 while the composer spent a sabbatical year in Hamburg, played at the Musikhochschule Hamburg by the Bramfelder Kantorei conducted by Klaus Vetter. The work was published by the Israel Music Institute.

== Structure ==
Misa Sine Nomine is in eleven movements for different scoring: a speaker, mixed choirs with up to 36 voices, organ and percussion, including gongs and suspended cymbals:

1. Bereschít bará elohím et haschamáim weét haáretz, text from the Bible, for two mixed choruses and percussion
2. Kyrie, for large mixed chorus
3. Lied, text by George Grosz, for speaker and organ
4. Gloria, for large mixed chorus and four gongs (1 player)
5. Chile, text by the composer, for 20 mixed voices
6. Credo, for speaker, large mixed chorus, organ and four bass drums (1 player)
7. Benedictus, for 36 mixed voices and four suspended cymbals (1 player)
8. Ich komme, text by Vladimir Mayakovsky, for 36 mixed voices
9. Dona nobis pacem, for large mixed chorus
10. Babel, text from the Bible, for 6 sopranos, 6 altos, 4 tenors, 4 basses
11. Epilog, text from the Bible, for speaker, small mixed chorus, large mixed chorus, organ, 4 percussion

The duration is given as 45 minutes.

The first movement is a setting of the beginning of the Hebrew Bible.

== Recording ==
The mass was recorded in 1998 by forces from the Emmauskirche in Berlin: the extended Ölberg-Chor, speaker Karl-Heinz Barthelmeus, organist Reinhard Hoffmann, and percussionists Nicole Hartig, Sebastian Trimolt, Thomas Rönnefarth and Jan Seeliger, conducted by Ingo Schulz. It was released in 2002. For a focus on the juxtaposition of mass liturgy and other texts, several tracks combine two movements.
