= Preis der Europäischen Kirchenmusik =

German music award

- Description: Excellence in composition and performance of sacred music
- Country: Germany
- Presented by: Schwäbisch Gmünd Festival
- Reward: €5,000
- Website: www.kirchenmusik-festival.de

The Preis der Europäischen Kirchenmusik is a German music prize awarded annually since 1999 by the Schwäbisch Gmünd Festival Europäische Kirchenmusik. Awards are given to excellent composers and artists for achievements in the field of sacred music. The prize is endowed with €5,000.

== Winners ==
- 1999: Dieter Schnebel
- 2000: Peter Schreier
- 2001: Petr Eben
- 2002: Eric Ericson
- 2003: Krzysztof Penderecki
- 2004: Frieder Bernius
- 2005: Arvo Pärt
- 2006: Daniel Roth
- 2007: Klaus Huber
- 2008: Helmuth Rilling
- 2009: Sofia Gubaidulina
- 2010: Marcus Creed
- 2011: Hans Zender
- 2012: Clytus Gottwald
- 2013: Sir John Tavener
- 2014: Thomanerchor Leipzig
- 2015: Younghi Pagh-Paan
- 2016: Hans-Christoph Rademann
- 2017: Wolfgang Rihm
- 2018: Godehard Joppich
- 2019: John Rutter
- 2020–2021: Joshua Rifkin
- 2022: Peteris Vasks
- 2023: Ludger Lohmann
- 2024: Karl Jenkins
- 2025: Gerlinde Sämann
- 2026: Thomas Jennefelt
