= Iveta Apkalna =

Latvian organist and pianist (born 1976)

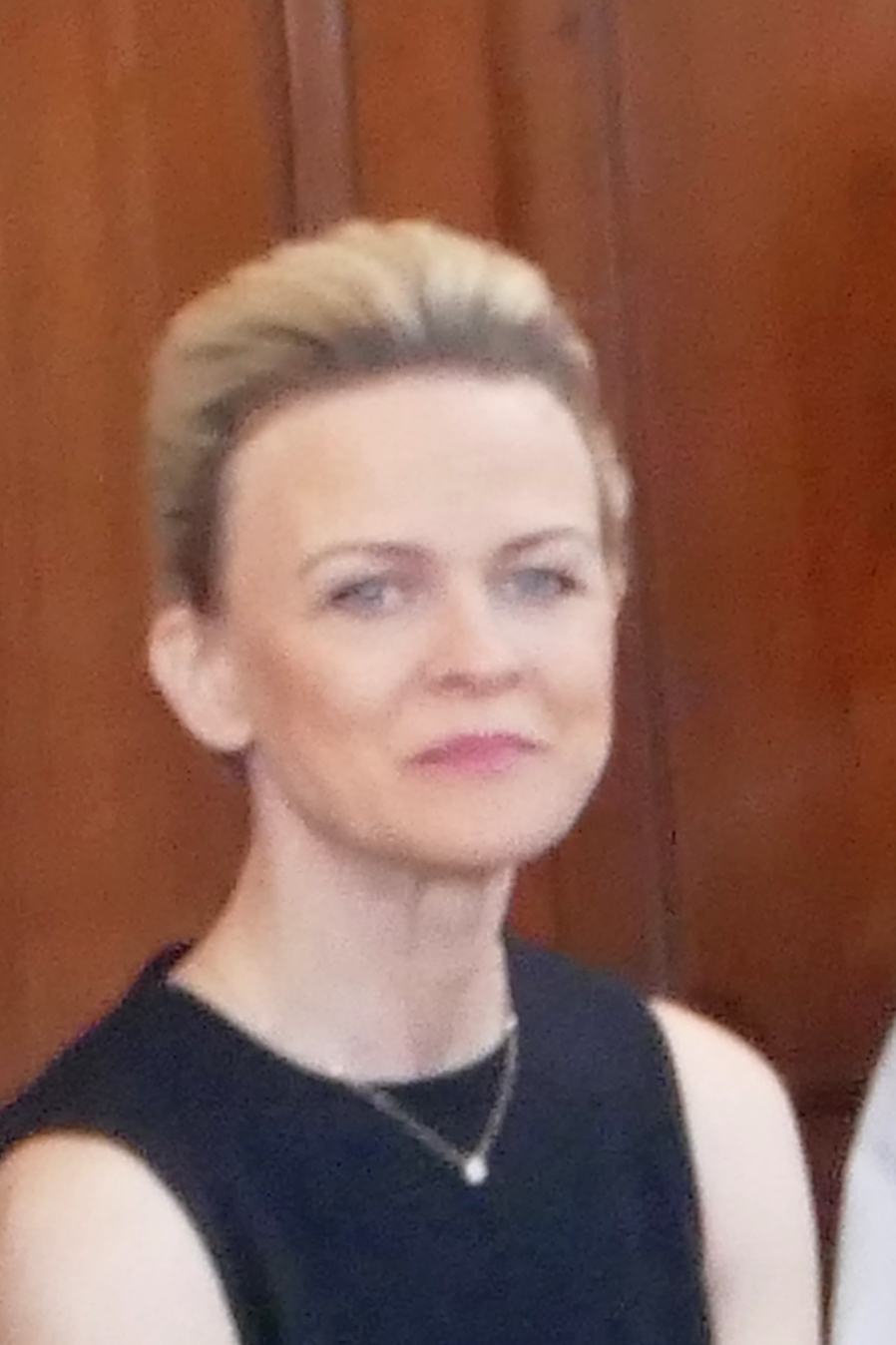
- Iveta Apkalna

Background information
- Born: Iveta Apkalna; 30 November 1976 (age 49); Rēzekne, Latvia
- Genre: Classical
- Occupations: Organist, Pianist
- Instruments: Organ, Piano
- Years active: 1999–present

Iveta Apkalna (born 30 November 1976, Rēzekne, Latvia) is a Latvian organist and pianist.

== Biography ==
Iveta Apkalna studied piano and organ at the Jāzeps Vītols Latvian Academy of Music, graduating in both instruments with distinction in 1999. In 1999 and 2000, she continued piano studies at the London Guildhall School of Music and Drama. In 2003, she completed a three-year-long study in the organ soloist class of Ludger Lohmann at the State University of Music and Performing Arts Stuttgart, Germany. She has given concerts in the biggest and most famous churches and cathedrals of Europe and North America, having taken part in the leading organ festivals, and has received numerous prizes in organ competitions. She regularly performs organ recitals at the Riga Cathedral. Her repertoire consists of organ music from J.S.Bach to contemporary composers, thereby bringing it beyond the borders of church walls. In 1993, she was the official organist in service at Aglona basilica (Latvia) during the visit of Pope John Paul II. Since its opening in 2016, she has served as the principal organist of the Elbphilharmonie.

== Awards ==
- 2002 – Winner of European Selection Round of the Royal Bank Calgary International Organ Competition in London.
- 2002 – J.S.Bach prize at the World Competition of the Royal Bank Calgary International Organ Competition, (Canada).
- 2003 – Winner of the 3rd Mikael Tariverdiev Organ Competition in Kaliningrad, Russia
- 2003, 2017 – Great Latvian Music Award
- 2005 – "ECHO-Klassik" prize in the category "Instrumentalist of the Year" for CD "Himmel & Hölle"

== Discography ==
- 2003 – Iveta Apkalna Live (edition Hera)
- 2004 – Touch down in Riga (edition Querstand)
- 2004 – Himmel & Hölle (edition Hera)
- 2006 – Prima Volta (edition Ifo)
- 2007 – Noema – David Orlowsky Klezmorim (edition Sony)
- 2008 – Trumpet and Organ (edition Phoenix)
- 2009 – The New Organ of the Philharmonie Mercatorhalle Duisburg (edition Acousence Classics)
- 2011 – L'Amour et la Mort (edition Oehms Classics)
- 2012 – Walter Braunfels (1882–1954): Konzert für Orgel, Knabenchor & Orchester op.38 (edition Oehms Classics)
- 2012 – Leoš Janáček (1854–1928): Missa Glagolytica (edition Pentatone)
- 2013 – Mariss Jansons conducts Brahms and Janacek (edition Arthaus)
- 2015 – Iveta Apkalna – Bach & Glass (edition Oehms Classic)
- 2018 – Light & Dark, First Solo Organ Recording from the Elbphilharmonie Hamburg (Berlin Classics)
- 2018 – Widmann: Arche, Marlis Petersen, Thomas E. Bauer, Iveta Apkalna, Kent Nagano, Philharmonisches Staatsorchester Hamburg (ECM)
