= PAN.OPTIKUM =

PAN.OPTIKUM Action Theatre is a theatre ensemble based in Freiburg im Breisgau, Germany.

== History ==
The PAN.OPTIKUM group was founded in Berlin in 1982 by Nesa Gschwend and Frank Niemöller who were interested in putting on performances in public venues. The name PAN.OPTIKUM comes from the original Panoptikum from the 1920s, quite near the site of its birth, whose performances included exhibiting and exposing people without their consent. Right from the start PAN.OPTIKUM exhibited human sculptures and itself respectively at various festivals and galleries. In 1983, following a longer stay in Indonesia, Nesa Gschwend and Frank Niemöller completed their first large-scale installation at the City Hall Market in Hamburg. This installation also marked the beginning of Nesa Gschwend’s large wind figures, which were to be a trademark of PAN.OPTIKUM for a longer period of time. In 1986 Nesa Gschwend left the group and returned to Switzerland where she dedicated herself to her own solo performances and art projects.

In the 1960s and 1970s many free theatre groups positioned themselves as an antithesis to the prevailing city theatre culture, after which the beginning of the 80s witnessed a further wave of new theatre and street theatre in Europe. For example, the "La Fura dels Baus" group was founded in Spain, the "Royal de Luxe" ensemble in France, and "Dogtroep" in Amsterdam.

When Sigrun Fritsch and Ralf Buron joined the ensemble in 1988 and 1989 respectively, the group's focus shifted to performances in public venues. These performances used ideas from Bauhaus in Dessau from the 20s and were based on connecting architecture, i.e. installation, and the performing arts.

It was at this time that the first large-scale productions were created, e.g. on the subject of Max Ernst, which earned PAN.OPTIKUM an invitation to the WorldFest in Atlanta. The theatre group moved to Freiburg im Breisgau at the beginning of the 90s. It was there that productions such as Liebe und Tod (Love and Death), a performance of two baroque operas with the Freiburger Barockorchester, and Bach's Christmas Oratorium served as a basis for further concept development.

In 1999 the ensemble joined forces with "Nachtwerk" from Stuttgart, a group of pyrotechnicans led by Karl Rechtenbacher, and went on to create the street production of Prometheus during the Year of Goethe. Together with new ensemble member Matthias Rettner, productions for audiences of several thousand people were created and performed. With these productions the ensemble, now comprising close to 40 people, has been giving guest performances in Europe and South America since 2003 at major theatre festivals including the Sziget Festival in Budapest, the Glastonbury Festival in England, and the Tárrega Festival in Spain as well as in Caracas, Santiago de Chile, Bogotá, the Festival Internacional Cervantino in Guanajuato and Guadalajara in México.

== Productions ==
- IL CORSO, an interpretation of The Book of Questions by Pablo Neruda, was performed in more than 100 European and South American cities between 2001 and 2007.
- ORPHEUS, a piece on the failure of love, was a work commissioned by Gerard Mortier which premiered at the RuhrTriennale in 2004.
- The CIVIL warS, an opera by Philip Glass, was performed in co-operation with the Freiburg Theatre under Theatre Director Amélie Niermeyer on the occasion of the season opening.
- BallGefühl, a production on the theme of football, was created for the government of the Federal Republic of Germany as part of the official art and culture programme accompanying the FIFA World Cup 2006 and ran in various cities with stadiums as well as in Salamanca, Spain in 2007.
- Medea: Voices, a performance of the novel by Christa Wolf, was shown with the permission of the author as a co-production under Theatre Director Barbara Mundel on the stage of the Freiburg Theatre in 2007.
- A performance of Carmina Burana by Carl Orff opens the season of the Theatre Basel in September 2008 under Theatre Director Georges Delnon.
- TRANSITion, a performance based on Le soleil et la morte from the writer and director Wajdi Mouawad, was premiered in 2009 at the World Heritage Site Zollverein Coal Mine Industrial Complex in Essen.
- The Loop of Fortune, a performance dedicated to the Night Festival 2009 of the National Museum of Singapore.

== Awards ==
- 2002: 1st prize for IL CORSO as best outdoor production at the International Street Theatre Festival in Holzminden
- 2005: Kulturpreis Baden-Württemberg
- 2006: 1st prize for ORPHEUS as best outdoor production at the Tárrega Festival in Spain
- 2008: Culture prize at the 2008 “MIXED UP” awards (a Federal German competition for co-operation between culture and schools) with the projects Being Tween

== Sources and references ==
- Kulturpreis Baden-Württemberg
- press release
- German Theatre register
- 33 Festival Cervantino
- Lyon 2005
- Ad Hoc News
- The Artistic and Cultural Programme to the FIFA World Cup 2006
- The European Festival Association
- Festivalului International de Teatru Sibiu 2007
- Street Art Festival Warsaw 2003
- Theatre Festival Gdansk 2007
- Night Festival 2009, Singapur
- Gran Canaria
- Recension, The CIVIL warS
- Street Theatre Companies
- ConcertoNet Review, The CIVIL warS
