= Dieter Schnebel =

German composer

- Born: 14 March 1930; Lahr, Baden, Germany
- Died: 20 May 2018 (aged 88); Berlin, Germany
- Resting place: Dahlem Cemetery
- Education: University of Tübingen
- Occupations: Composer; Theologian; Musicologist
- Organization: Hochschule der Künste, Berlin
- Awards: Akademie der Künste; Bayerische Akademie der Schönen Künste; European Church Music Prize; Bundesverdienstkreuz am Bande

Dieter Schnebel (14 March 1930 – 20 May 2018) was a German composer, theologian and musicologist. He composed orchestral music, chamber music, vocal music and stage works. From 1976 until his retirement in 1995, Schnebel served as professor of experimental music at the Hochschule der Künste, Berlin.

== Career ==
Schnebel was born in Lahr/Baden. He began general private music studies with Wilhelm Siebler from 1942 until 1945, when he started piano lessons with Wilhelm Resch, and continued study with him until 1949 at the age of 19. He continued with music history through 1952, under Eric Doflein. Simultaneously he began to study composition, from 1950, with Ernst Krenek, Theodor W. Adorno and Pierre Boulez, among others. He entered formal studies at the University of Tübingen where he took musicology with Walter Gerstenberg, as well as theology, philosophy and further piano studies. In 1955, he left with a degree in theology, but with a dissertation about Arnold Schoenberg. Soon after, he married Camilla Riegger in 1956, and the couple had a son and daughter. Schnebel became a minister, and taught theology and religion until 1963 when he began teaching philosophy and psychology. After his first wife died, he underwent a period of psychoanalysis. In 1970 he married translator Iris von Kaschnitz (1928–2014), daughter of Marie Luise Kaschnitz, and began teaching religious studies and music in Munich, which he continued until 1976. His students included Australian composer Norma Tyer. In 1976, he began teaching in Berlin as a professor of experimental music and music research, a chair created for him. He held it until his retirement in 1995.

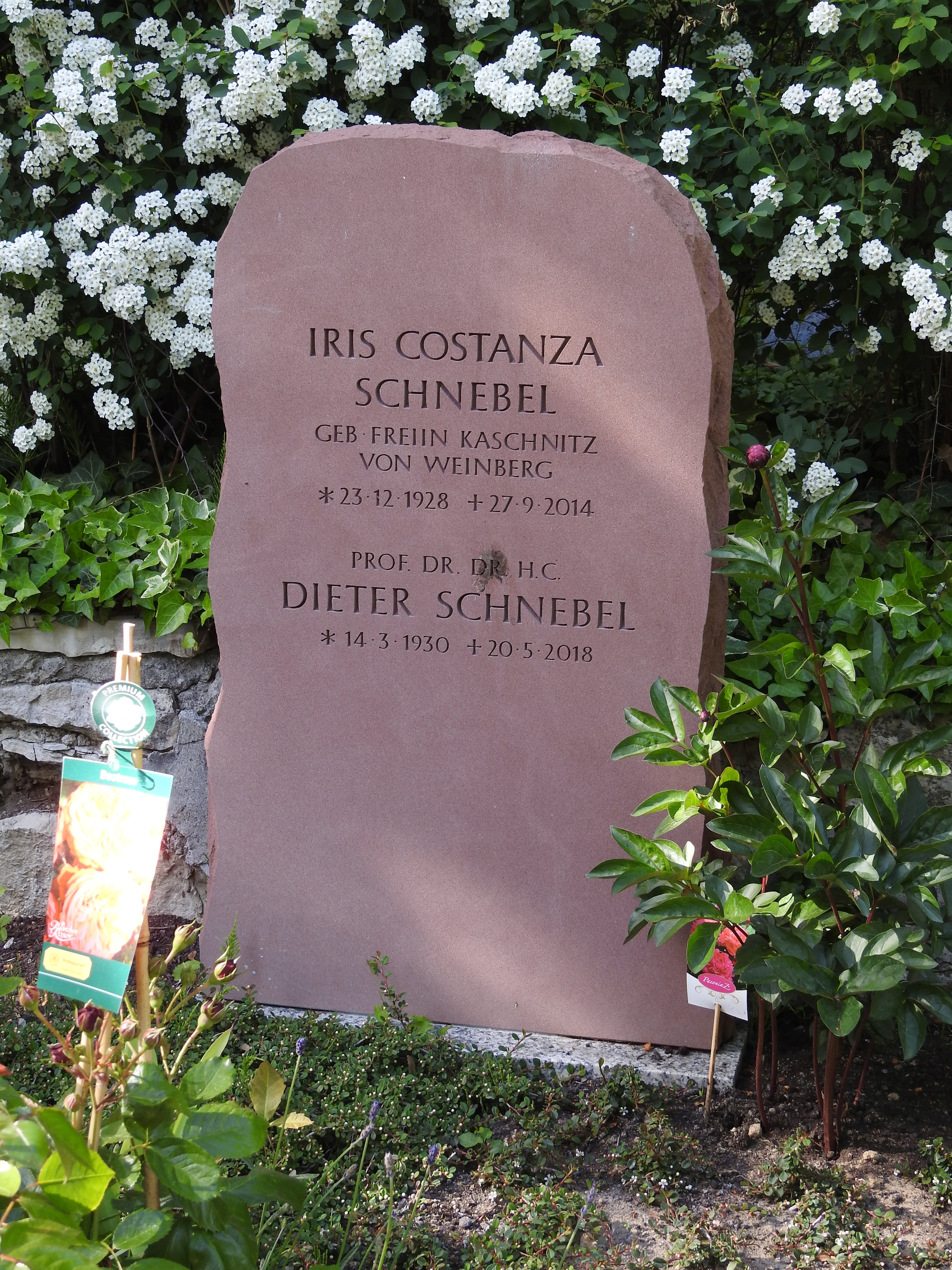
Tombstone, Dahlem Cemetery

Invited by Walter Fink, he was the sixth composer featured in the annual Komponistenporträt of the Rheingau Musik Festival in 1996, where his Schau-Stücke for voices and gestures premiered.

Schnebel died of a heart ailment in Berlin on 20 May 2018 at the age of 88. His and his wife's grave is in Dahlem Cemetery.

== Cycles and style ==
Schnebel composed several cycles of works, sometimes over a long time. One of them was called Versuche (Essays), consisting of four works written 1953 to 1956. They concern serial techniques, exploring space by placing performers at separate positions. His religious music includes a cycle Für Stimmen (...missa est) (For voices ...), consisting of four works written 1956 to 1969). They use the human voice and organ in experimental settings of prayers and biblical texts. A cycle Produktionsprozesse is a group of compositions related to "language and body" which concerns the physical sound production, with the performers utilizing speech and breathing organs in unusual ways.

His earliest works were strongly influenced by his fellow Darmstadt students Karlheinz Stockhausen, about whose early works he wrote an extended essay, and Mauricio Kagel, about whom he edited a book. Starting in 1959, he also came under the influence of John Cage.)

Schnebel made arrangements of works by Bach, Beethoven, Webern and Wagner, called Re-Visions, sometimes using their traditional concepts to reflect new techniques and different ways of looking at them.

== Awards ==
Schnebel's awards include the Arts Prize of Lahr in 1991. He received the first European Church Music Prize in Schwäbisch Gmünd the same year. He was a member of the Berlin Akademie der Künste from 1991, and of the Bayerische Akademie der Schönen Künste since 1996. In 2015, he was awarded the Bundesverdienstkreuz am Bande.

== Works ==
Schnebel's works are held by the German National Library. Many of them are published by Schott Music.

=== Music with orchestra ===
- Compositio (1955–56, rev. 1964/1965)
- Orchestra / Symphonische Musik für mobile Musiker (1974–1977)
- Canones (1975–1977; 1993/1994)
- Schubert-Phantasie (Re-Visionen I_{5}, for divided orchestra and voices) (1978, rev. 1989 as Blendwerk, for string orchestra)
- Thanatos-Eros (Traditione III_{1}), symphonic variations for large orchestra (1979–82, rev.1984–85)
- Sinfonie-Stücke (Traditione III_{2}) (1984–85)
- Missa, Dahlem Mass for four solo voices, two mixed choirs, orchestra and organ (1984–1987)
- Mahler-Moment, for strings (1985)
- Sinfonie X (Tradition VI) (1987–1992; 2004/2005)
- Mozart-Moment (1988/1989)
- Schumann-Moment (Re-Visionen II_{2}, for voices, winds, harp, and percussion (1989)
- Verdi-Moment (Re-Visionen II_{5}, for orchestra (1989)
- St. Jago (Tradition IV_{2}, 3 speakers, 4 singers, and ensemble: music and images to Heinrich von Kleist (1989–1991) (rev. 1995)
- Janáček-Moment (Re-Visionen II_{1}), for orchestra (1991)
- Totentanz, ballet-oratorio for two speakers, soprano, bass, choir, orchestra and live electronic (1992–1994)
- inter, for chamber orchestra (1994)
- O Liebe! – süßer Tod..., five sacred songs after Johann Sebastian Bach for mezzo-soprano, chamber choir, and small orchestra (1995)
- Ekstasis for soprano, speaker, two children's voices, percussion, choir and large orchestra (1996/1997; 2001/2002)

=== Chamber music ===
- Analysis, for strings and percussion (1953)
- Stücke, for string quartet or string octet (1954–55)
- Fragment, for chamber ensemble and voice obligato (1955)
- Das Urteil after Franz Kafka, Raummusik für Instrumente, Stimmen und sonstige Schallquellen (Space music for instruments, voices and other sound sources) (1959, rev. 1990)
- Glossolalie (1959–61), instructions for composition
  - Glossolalie 61 (1959–1961)
  - Glossolalie 94 (1994)
- Maulwerke (1968–74); staged in 1977 by Achim Freyer at the Musiktheaterwerkstatt Wiesbaden Version 2010
- Körpersprache / Organkomposition (Body Language / Organ Composition), for 3–9 players (1979/1980)
- Memento, for voice and accordion (1981)
- Montiano-Song, for one or more voices and instruments (1983)
- Beethoven-Symphonie (Re-Visionen I_{2}), for chamber ensemble (1985)
- Metamorphosenmusik, for voice and chamber ensemble (1986/1987)
- Metamorphosen des Ovid or Die Bewegung von den Rändern zur Mitte hin und umgekehrt, incidental music for 11 voices and 11 strings (1986–87)
- Mit diesen Händen, for voice and cello with curved bow (1992)
- Baumzucht (J. P. Hebel), musical reading after Johann Peter Hebel for speaker and chamber ensemble (1992/1995)
- Schau-Stücke (Body Études) (1995)
  - Keine grossen Sprünge, for two performers
  - Kopfschütteln, for five performers
  - Schlängeln, for two performers
- Magnificat (1996/97)
- String Quartet No. 2 (2000–2007)
- Flipper, chamber music for Spielautomaten, actors, instruments and tape (2002/2003)
- String Quartet No. 3 "Im Raum" (2005–2006)
- Drei Kafka-Dramolette, Der plötzliche Spaziergang, Entschlüsse and Gib's auf! (2009)

=== Vocal ===
- Für Stimmen (… missa est): I. dt 31,6 for 12 vocal groups (1956–58), II. AMN for 7 vocal groups (1958–67), III. :! (madrasha II) for 3 choir groups and magnetic tape ad lib. (1958–68), IV. Choralvorspiele I/II for organ, side instruments, magnetic tape and amplifier (1966–69)
- Maulwerke, for amplified voices and electronics (1968–74)
- Körper-Sprache, for 3–9 performers (1979–80)
- Bach-Contrapuncti (I, VI, XI) (Re-Visionen I_{1}, for voices (1972–76); revised as O Liebe! – süsser Tod (1984–95)
- Motetus I, for two choruses (1989–93)
- "Mein Herz ruht müde", for alto voice and piano (1994)
- Motetus II, for two choruses (1997–98)
- Behütet ... : Psalm 121, for chorus (SSMezAATTBarBB), with organ or synthesizer ad lib. (2012)

== Bibliography ==
Sources

- Anon. (n.d.a). "Compositions by Dieter Schnebel". German National Library.
- Anon. (n.d.b) "Dieter Schnebel", Bayerisches Musiker-Lexikon Online. Munich: Ludwig-Maximilians-Universität München (accessed 22 May 2018). (in German)
- Anon. (24 January 2010). "Melancholie der Pneumatik, auf minimalistische Schrittfolgen reduziert". Frankfurter Allgemeine Sonntagszeitung.
- Anon. (2015). "Dieter Schnebel". Akademie der Künste.
- Anon. (20 May 2018a). "Komponist Dieter Schnebel gestorben". Deutschlandfunk.
- Anon. (21 May 2018b). "Nachruf: Deutscher Komponist Dieter Schnebel gestorben". Kleine Zeitung (in German).
- Attinello, Paul. "Schnebel, Dieter (Wolfgang)". The New Grove Dictionary of Music and Musicians, second edition, 29 vols., edited by Stanley Sadie and John Tyrrell. London: Macmillan Publishers, 2001.
- Clements, Andrew. "Schnebel, Dieter". The New Grove Dictionary of Opera, 4 vols., edited by Stanley Sadie. London: Macmillan Publishers, 1992.
- Deutsche Presse-Agentur. Mit 88 Jahren: Komponist Dieter Schnebel gestorben. Schweriner Volkszeitung (2018; accessed 21 May 2018).
- Göbel, Andreas. "Zum Tod des Komponisten Dieter Schnebel: Neugierig auf ungehörte Töne". Deutschlandfunk (2018; accessed 22 May 2018).
- Herman, Michael. "German and Austrian Symphonies / From The 19th Century To The Present" (PDF). musicweb-international.com, 2017.
- Schell, Michael. "Dieter Schnebel (1930–2018): Radical Reverential Music". Second Inversion (July 11, 2018).
- Schnebel, Dieter. "Schau-Stücke". Schott Music, 1997.
- Schnebel, Dieter. "Mit diesen Händen / With These Hands". Stuttgart and Wissembourg: Bach-Bogen.de (n.d.; accessed 21 May 2018).
- Schott Music. "Dieter Schnebel: Works". Schott Music website (accessed 22 May 2018).
- Zimmerlin, Michael (2018). "Komponist Dieter Schnebel ist gestorben: Ein Experimentator, der keine Grenzen scheute". Neue Zürcher Zeitung (in German).
