= Max Stern (artist) =

German painter (1872–1943)

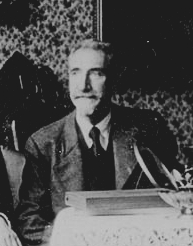
- Born: 15 June 1872; Düsseldorf, Germany
- Died: 12 June 1943 (aged 70); Düsseldorf, Germany

Max Stern (15 June 1872 – 12 June 1943) was a German painter and graphic artist of Jewish ancestry, associated with the Düsseldorfer Malerschule. He was originally an Impressionist, but later became an advocate of the New Objectivity.

== Life and work ==
His father, Adolph Stern, died before he was born and his mother, Rosalie, née Rothschild, died when he was eleven. Together with his three older siblings, he went to live with an aunt who owned a clothing store. At the age of sixteen, he was accepted as a student at the Kunstakademie Düsseldorf, where his instructors included Adolf Schill, Peter Janssen and Eduard von Gebhardt. He studied there until 1892. He then transferred to the Academy of Fine Arts, Munich, where he worked with the genre painter, Carl von Marr. In 1893, he was the youngest participant in an exhibition of the Munich Secession. The following year, his studies were interrupted by military service. Upon being discharged, he spent a few months in Venice.

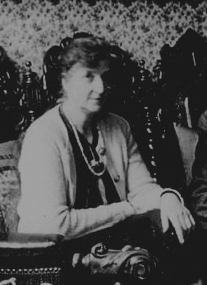
His wife, Alice

After returning to Düsseldorf, he married Alice Helene Burnier (1877–1943), a gentile; daughter of the Dutch painter, Richard Burnier. He also became a member of the progressive artists' group, Malkasten. In 1910, Alfred Flechtheim, an art dealer from Münster with a special interest in French impressionism, became his patron. Despite serving as a non-commissioned officer in France and Belgium during World War I, he was able to continue exhibiting; notably at the Große Berliner Kunstausstellung.

In the mid-1920s, he abandoned Impressionism for the sparser New Objectivity. In both styles, his primary focus was on urban and rural scenes of people living their simple, daily lives. Although he occasionally portrayed the upper classes at their amusements, he was especially sympathetic to working people, practicing their professions.

His career progressed uneventfully until the Nazi takeover in 1933. At that point, he was placed under a professional ban, and expelled from Malkasten. With the establishment of the Reichskulturkammer, it became difficult to obtain painting supplies. Despite this, he and his fellow Jewish artists in the Judische Kulturbund were able to exhibit among themselves until 1936. Shortly after that, in 1937, Joseph Goebbels ordered the confiscation of all "degenerate art", which included Stern's works.

More than his professional life was affected. His personal life came under scrutiny as well, when "mixed marriages" were defined as a "disgrace" under the Nuremberg Laws. Many couples were advised to divorce, or face possible prosecution. His honorable service in the war tended to mitigate the persecution somewhat, until late in 1938, when the Sturmabteilung invaded their home; destroying paintings and furniture. They found refuge in a hospital, operated by the Sisters of Mercy, where his brother, Leopold, had worked as a doctor.

He was killed during a bombing by the RAF, as Jews were unable to use the air-raid shelters. Six months later, Alice committed suicide with an overdose of sleeping pills. Most of his surviving paintings are in private collections; many in the United States and Israel. Some are in the possession of the Museum Kunstpalast and the Stadtmuseum Landeshauptstadt Düsseldorf.

== Selected paintings ==
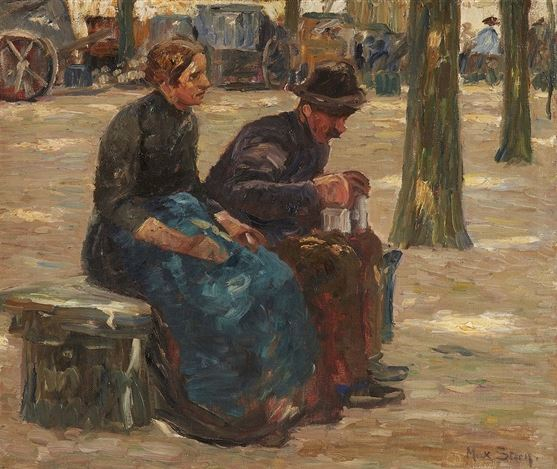
Old Couple on a Bench

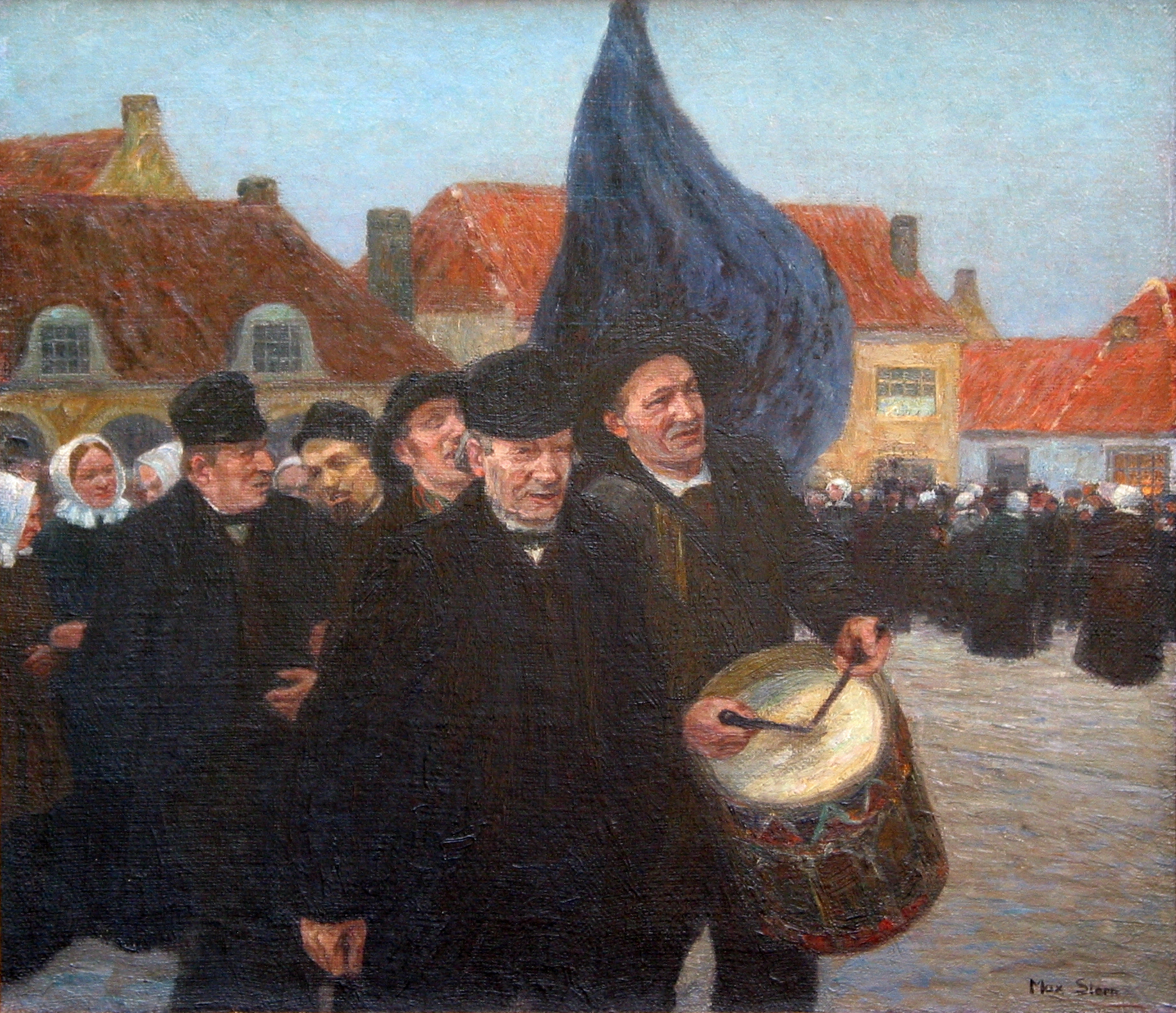
Dutch Folk Festival

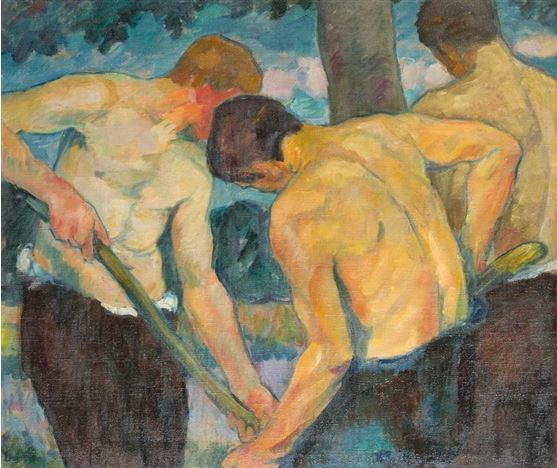
Three Workers

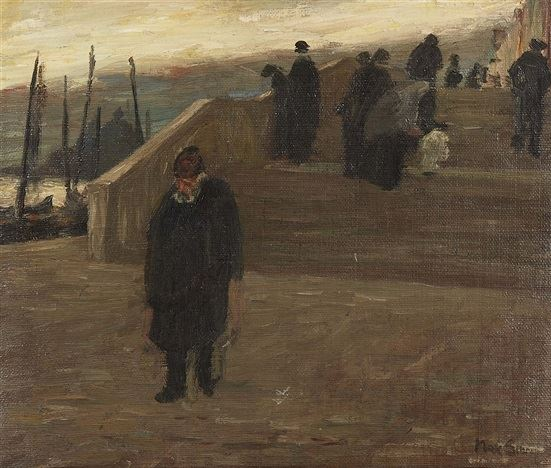
View of Venice

== Sources ==
- "Stern, Max", In: Allgemeines Lexikon der Bildenden Künstler von der Antike bis zur Gegenwart, Vol. 32: Stephens–Theodotos, E. A. Seemann, Leipzig 1938
- Max Stern zum 50. Todestag: Stadtmuseum Düsseldorf, 2.6.–22.8.1993, exhibition catalog, Werner Alberg. Düsseldorf 1993.
- Hans Paffrath (Ed.): Lexikon der Düsseldorfer Malerschule 1819–1918. Vol.3: Nabert–Zwecker., Kunstmuseum Düsseldorf and Galerie Paffrath. Bruckmann, 1998, ISBN 3-7654-3011-0
- Silke Köhn: Max Stern 1872–1943. In: Sammler Journal, July 2007, pp. 54–61
- Silke Köhn: Max Stern 1872–1943 – Vom Naturalismus zum Impressionismus. Bilder aus einer Privatsammlung, Forum Jacob Pins, Höxter 2012
