= Unser lieben Frauen Traum =

Sacred motet by Max Roger

- Motet by Max Reger
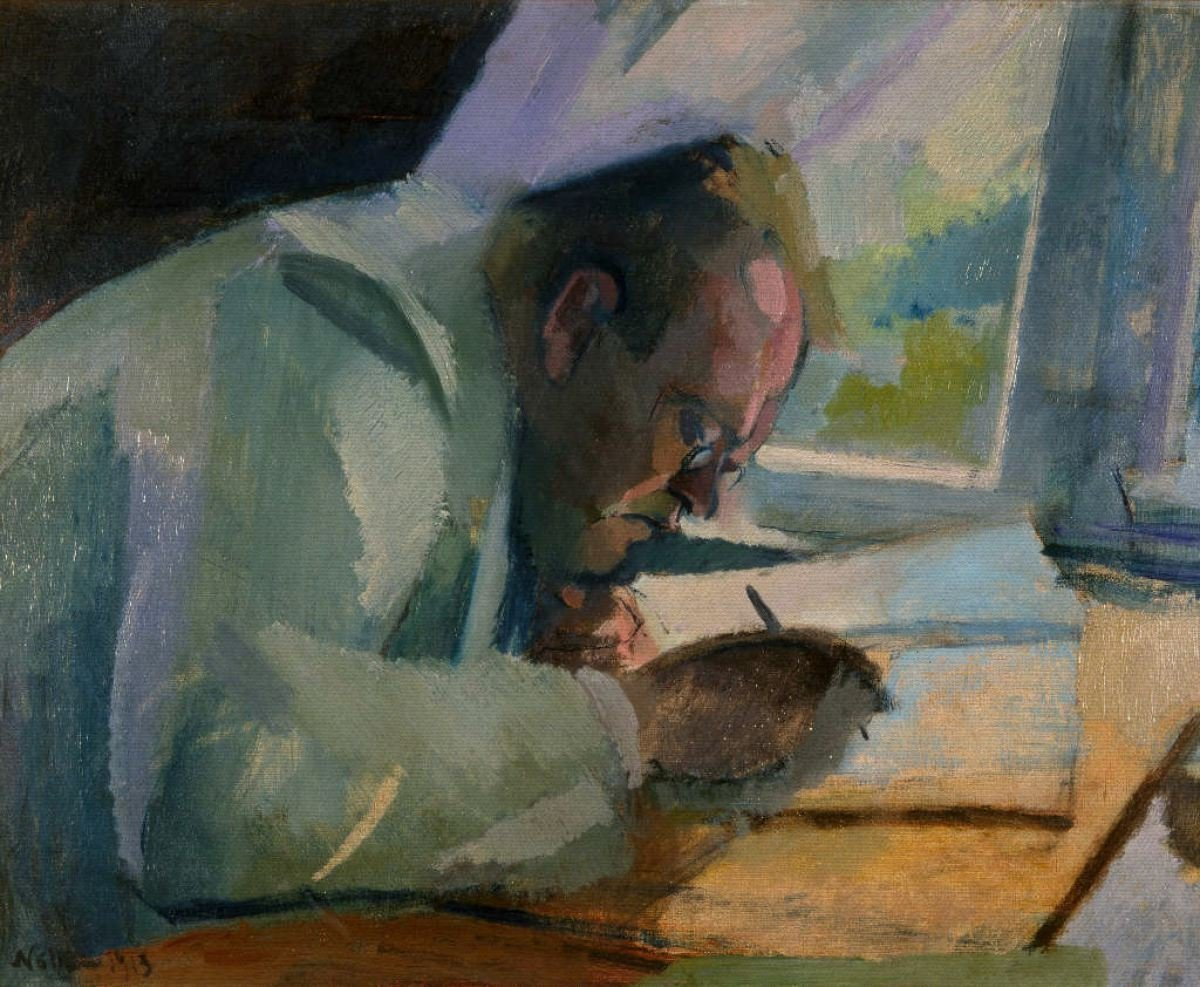
- The composer at work, a painting by Franz Nölken, 1913
- Key: F major
- Opus: 138, No. 4
- Text: anonymous
- Language: German
- Composed: 1914
- Published: 1916
- Scoring: SSATBB choir

Unser lieben Frauen Traum (Our dear Lady's dream, Our Lady's Vision) Op. 138, No. 4, is a sacred motet for unaccompanied mixed choir by Max Reger. The German text is a poem by an anonymous poet, derived from a Volkslied. The piece is in F major and scored for up to six voices, SSATBB. Composed in Meiningen in 1914, it was published in 1916 after Reger's death as the fourth of Acht geistliche Gesänge (Eight Sacred Songs). It is often performed in Advent.

== History ==
Reger composed the motets of Op. 138 in Meiningen in 1914, at the beginning of World War I, when he also worked on Requiem projects in Latin and German. Inspired by Bach's motets, he had composed "extended a cappella choral settings", such as Geistliche Gesänge, Op. 110, dedicated to the Thomanerchor, with challenging double fugues. In great contrast, he composed eight motets forming Acht geistliche Gesänge (Eight Sacred Songs), Op. 138, as a master of "new simplicity". He died before finishing to check the Korrekturbögen (proofs) from the publisher. Unser lieben Frauen Traum was published in 1916 as the fourth of Acht geistliche Gesänge (Eight Sacred Songs).

1. Der Mensch lebt und bestehet (Matthias Claudius)
2. Morgengesang (Johannes Zwick)
3. Nachtlied (Petrus Herbert)
4. Unser lieben Frauen Traum (anonymous)
5. Kreuzfahrerlied (anonymous)
6. Das Agnus Dei (Nikolaus Decius)
7. Schlachtgesang (anonymous)
8. Wir glauben an einen Gott (anonymous)

== Text and music ==
The German text consists of three short stanzas by an anonymous poet, derived from a religious folk song, that was first printed in 1602 in a Catholic hymnal edited by Nicolaus Beuttner.

Und unser lieben Frauen, der traumet ihr ein Traum
wie unter ihrem Herzen gewachsen wär ein Baum.

Und wie der Baum ein Schatten gäb wohl über alle Land:
Herr Jesus Christ der Heiland, also ist er genannt.

Herr Jesus Christ der Heiland ist unser Heil und Trost,
mit seiner bittern Marter hat er uns all erlöst.

The topic is a dream of Mary, "our dear Lady", of a tree growing under her heart, providing shadow over all land, called Jesus Christ the Saviour. The final stanza says that he is "our salvation and consolation", who freed us by his bitter martyrdom. A sermon held in the Thomaskirche where the motet was performed by the Thomanerchor pointed out that the growing tree refers to the wood of the cross on which Jesus suffered. Related to a dream about pregnancy, the piece is often performed in Advent.

A free English translation of the poem was provided by Catherine Winkworth, "Our Lady lay a-sleeping". A translation to be sung was written by Jean Lunn, published by Carus: "And to our blessed lady".

Max Reger produced an altogether new composition, not making use of the existing folk tune. The piece is in F major and scored for up to six voices, SSATBB. It is marked "Zart bewegt", roughly: "in tender motion". The first two stanzas of the poem are set the same, in 3/4 time for four vocal parts, soprano, alto, tenor and bass. The second stanza has different dynamics for the same notes. As a climax, the third stanza is in common time and set for six parts by division of the soprano and bass. It begins with a forceful acclamation "Herr Jesus Christ" (Lord Jesus Christ), followed by the first rest in the whole motet. The last line about salvation for "us all" ("uns all") reaches high tension, in terms of both harmony and fortissimo on "all", which is released within only two beats to pianissimo, then the last half line is repeated, beginning softly and fading away.

== Recordings ==
The motet has been recorded in programs for Advent and Christmas, such as a collection by the chamber choir ars antiqua Aschaffenburg, and in recordings of the complete motets Op. 138, for example by the NDR Chor conducted by Hans-Christoph Rademann.

- Reger, Max; Knothe, Dietrich; Thomanerchor; MDR-Rundfunkchor (Leipzig), Unser lieben Frauen Traum, OCLC 661703917
- Reger, Max; Stier, Gothart; Dresdner Kreuzchor (2005), Unser lieben Frauen Traum, OCLC 1117236216
