= Max Stern (composer) =

American-Israeli Musical artist

Max Stern מקס שטרן
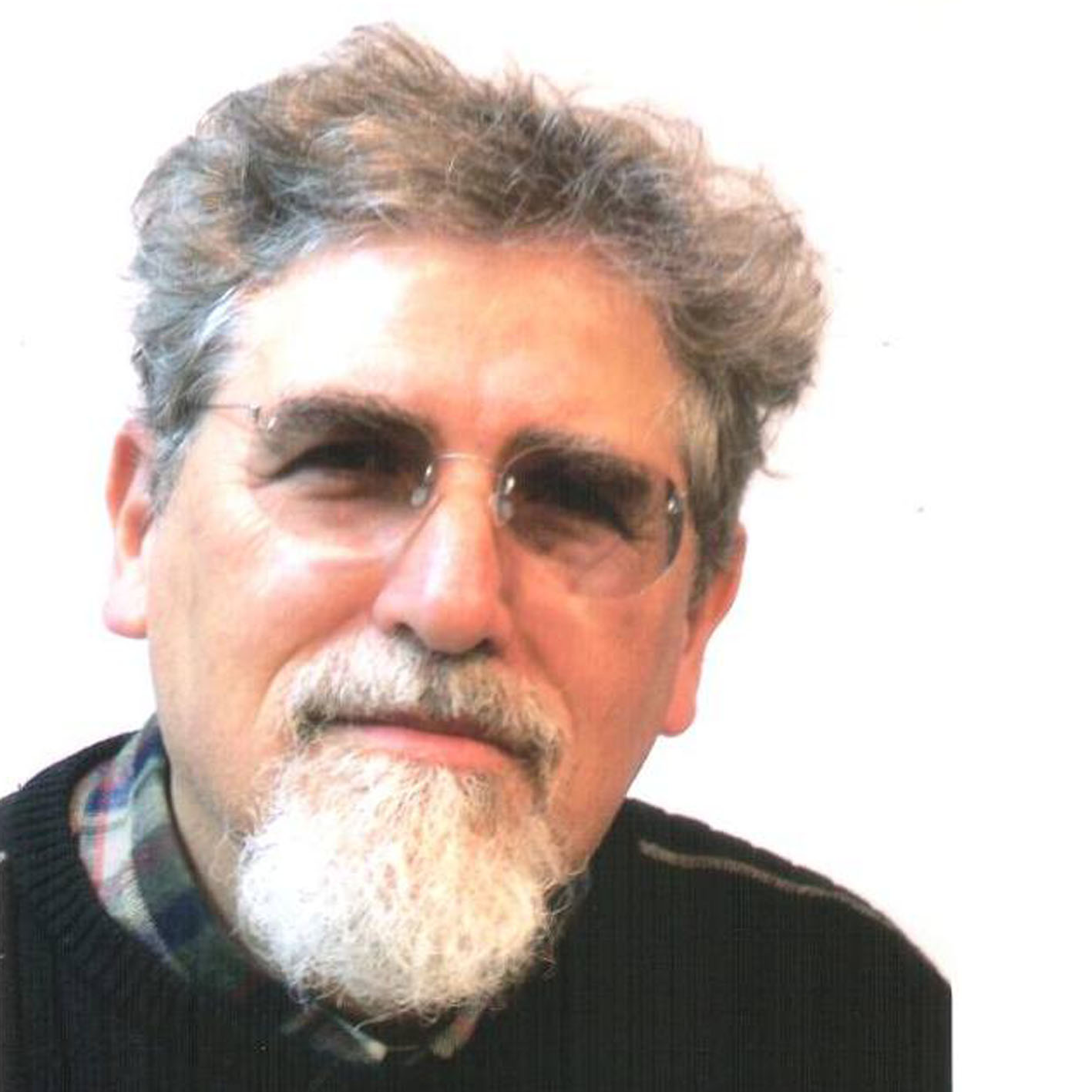
- Max Stern

Background information
- Born: Max Stern; March 31, 1947 (age 79); Valley Stream, NY, United States
- Genre: Classic
- Occupations: Composer, Critic, Double-bassist, Conductor
- Instrument: Double bass
- Website: www.maxsternmusic.com

Max Stern (Hebrew: מקס שטרן; born March 31, 1947, in Valley Stream, New York) is a composer, critic, double-bassist, conductor and educator. He has created a rich genre of biblical compositions blending East and West in contemporary and traditional genres.

== Musical education ==
Stern sang in the synagogue as a boy and began music in the public schools; playing tuba and contrabass in bands, orchestras, shows etc. In high school, he studied contrabass with Frederick Zimmermann, (NYC,1963–65), and participated in chamber music workshops led by the Budapest String Quartet at SUNY at Buffalo (1963–64). Composition- Samuel Adler, theory- Robert Gauldin, orchestration- Bernard Rogers, contrabass-Oscar Zimmerman, voice classes of Julius Huehn at the Eastman School of Music(BM, Rochester, New York 1969); privately Hall Overton (NYC, 1966 & 67). Further composition- theoretical studies with Alexander Goehr, double bass w. Gary Karr at Yale School of Music, New Haven (MM, 1970). Addition Studies at the First International Kodaly Seminar, Kesckemet, Hungary(1970) and at the Kodaly Musical Training Institute, Wellesley, Mass., pedagogy and choral conducting - Peter Erdei, solfege and folkmusic research with Kati Komlos(1970–71). Later, he studied Ethnomusicology with Johanna Spector at the Jewish Theological Seminary, NYC (1973–75), taking courses in Anthropology, and the Middle East at Columbia University, sociology and psychology of education at Hunter College, contemporary literature and ideas in literature at Queens College (1965, 71, 74). He received a Doctorate of Musical Arts from the University of Colorado, Bouilder, 1989, where he worked with William Kearns (American Music), Richard Toensing (Atonal music), Luis Gonzalez and Charles Eakin(composition) and Karl Kroeger(bibliography) writing dissertations on "Indeterminacy and Improvisation" and "Henrich Schutz: Psalm Settings". He participated in masterclasses at the Vienna Music Seminar in conducting with Erwin Acel (summer, 1997 & 98), and at Pro Mundo Uno, Tivoli with Kurt Redel (summer, 1997).

== Activities ==
He has served on the executive board of the Israel Composers' League (1991–92) and represented Israel's composers at a number of ISCM Festivals in Oslo, Zurich, Mexico City and Essen. He was selected as their first repräsentative to the Asia Composers League Festival, Manila, Philippines, 1997. He has toured Romania(1993), and South Africa (1994), participated in Festival Horowitz, Castelfranco, Italy(1994), Music Judaica, Prague (1995), and the Festival of the Old Testament, Prague (1996), and given solo contrabass recitals of his compositions in Zurich and Vienna (2000).

Max Stern worked as a freelance musician from 1969 to 1975, performing contrabass with the Rochester Philharmonic, New Haven Symphony, Bridgeport Symphony, Springfield Symphony Orchestra(principal), Brooklyn Philharmonic, Music for Westchester, National Orchestral Association, Radio City Music Hall, Caramoor Festival, Spoleto Festival, and American Ballet Theatre (principal) performing under Leonard Bernstein, Arthur Fiedler, Walter Hendl, Lazlo Somogy, Jose Iturbi, Lukas Foss, Frank Brief, David Gilbert, Leon Barzin and others. Simultaneously he was engaged as arranger for the American Ballet Theatre where he was commissioned to write special arrangements for luminaries: Natalia Makarova, Mikhail Baryshnikov and Gelsey Kirkland. During these years, Stern also taught at the Third Street Music School Settlement on the lower East Side, Wagner College on Staten Island and the Queensboro Community College.

He moved to Israel in 1976 and performed with the Kol Israel Radio - Jerusalem Symphony Orchestra under Lukas Foss, George Singer, Gary Bertitni, and Mendi Rodan(1976–78). At the invitation of Mendi Rodan he played with the Israel Sinfonietta Beer Sheva (1979–80). On a grant from the Memorial Foundation for Jewish Culture he researched Jewish oriental music and wrote a series of original pieces based on ethnic sources mostly taken from the ethnomusicology collection of Professor Uri Sharvit, Bar Ilan University(1978–79). From 1980 to 1987 he devoted himself to education, creating the concept of instrumental music and publishing a 10 volume Youth Band series of arrangements at Yeshivat B'nai Akiva, Beer-Sheva where he initiated and directed a band program for seven years. Simultaneously he served as director of the Conservatory in the development town of Yeroham. Since 1988 he serves as music critic for "The Jerusalem Post" where he has written numerous articles and reviews. In 1993 he began an affiliation with Ben-Gurion University of the Negev which has blossomed into an orchestral program, courses, and a music unit within the department of the arts. Recently he joined the faculty of the College of Judea and Samaria.

== Prizes, grants, fellowships, commissions ==
BMI Student Composers Award (finalist-1969), MacDowell Colony Fellowships (1973 & 74), Memorial Foundation for Jewish Culture research grant (1978–79), Israel Composers' League - Lieberson Prize Competition (finalist-1984), ICL-Lieberson Prize Competition (winner - Balaam and the Ass-1990), Japanese Society for Contemporary Music, International Music for Children Competition, Tokyo (award winner – Perek Shira-1991), National Council for Culture and Art, commission (1989), NCCA grant for CD (MS 1-1993), ICL-Lieberson Prize Competition (finalist-1998), Histadrut Federation of Labor, Negev (service award, 2003).

== Selected works ==
Orchestral

- Serenade to a City for Strings 14' (1968)
- Sonnet for Orchestra 9' (1968)
- Symphoniae 35' (1975)
- Song of the Morning Stars 8' (1980)IMI
- Ha'azinu for contrabass and orchestra 32' (1989)
- Toccata for piano and orchestra 15' (1991)
- Perek Shira for narrator and orchestra 15' (1993)
- Yobel 13' (1998) IMC
- Arise, Shine! 12' (1999)
- Tamarisk-Beersheba 12' (2001)

Chamber music

- String Quartet 16' (1972)
- Three Ancient Pieces for flute and guitar 8' (1983)
- Trio Pastoral for flute, bassoon and piano 11' (1984)
- Rainbow for saxophone ensemble 8' (1985)
- Eshkolot trio for trumpet, horn & trombone 9' (1984) Or-tav
- Gematria for bassoons 6-13' (1986)
- Psalterion 13'( 1987) IMI
- Bedouin Impressions (רשמים בדואים) for violin, or viola, or cello solo (1998); Or-tav
- Balaam and the Ass for trombone and percussion 15' (1990)Or-tav
- Yoducha Raiyonai, variations for piano 4-hands 7' (1990)
- Piyutasia, Sephardic Fantasy for flute, violin or clarinet and piano 11' (1991)
- Piano Quartet from the East for clarinet, violin, cello and piano 32' (1993)
- Epiludes for solo contrabass 20' (1996)
- Jacob and the Angel for harp and piano 15' (1997)
- Mosaic for flute, English horn, violin, cello and keyboard 12' (1999)

Vocal

- Three American Songs for voice and piano 10' (1973)
- Terezín Songs for soprano, flute, oboe, guitar and cello 10' ( 1969/2000)
- Seven Voices for soprano and strings 10' (1978/1993)
- Prayer for Israel for voice and orchestra 7' (1989)
- Sabbath, Psalm 92 for soprano and strings 12' (1995)
- Song of Hannah for soprano, oboe and strings 9' (1995)
- Bereshith (Genesis) for soprano, flute, strings and percussion 20' (1991)

Choral music

- Motets on Chanukah Songs (SSA) 6' (1971)
- Four Festivals (SSA) 10' (1971)
- Prayer for Israel (SATB) 7' (1989)
- Magnificat Hebraica (SATB-SATB) 12' (1996)
- Out of the Whirlwind cantata for soloist, chorus and CO 35' (1997)

Stage

- The Philosophy Lesson, chamber opera after Molière, for two baritones and small orchestra 20' (1967)
- Galumph, ballet for 7 instruments 15'(1968)
- Incidental Music to S.J. Agnon: "In the Bloom of Her Days" for solo contrabass, produced at Jerusalem Khan Theatre, 1977
- We Never Thought a Wedding, musical to text by Helen Duberstein, produced Off-Off Broadway, 1977
- Willow Branches, opera in three acts, libretto by the composer after a story by Donn Bryne based on the Travels of Marco Polo, 3hrs, (2001)

== Discography ==
- Ha'azinu (MS 1 – 1993) ACUM

Haazinu for contrabass and orchestra; Gray Karr, contrabass/Jerusalem SO/A. Fagen
Balaam and the Ass for trombone and percussion
Three Ancient Pieces for flute and guitar
Rainbow for seven saxophones
Psalterion for harp

- Bereshith (MS 2 – 1995) ACUM

Bereshith: Creation of the World - Amalia Ishak, soprano, A.Ornoy, flute / Ashdod Chamber Orchestra/conductor, L. Gorelik
Song of the Morning Stars-Israel Sinfonietta/Beersheba/Uri Mayer
Sonnet for Orchestra-Jerusalem SO/M.Cannelakis
Piyutasia-Wendy Eisler-Kashi, flute/Alan Sternfield, piano
Serenade to a City/composer conducting

- Symphoniae (MS 3 – 1997) ACUM

Symphoniae-Jerusalem Symphony Orchestra/David Robertson
Song of Hannah-Kristyna Valouskova, soprano/Collegium Musica Sacra/ Podrazil
Epiludes after S.Y.Agnon "Bid'mi Yameyha" - Max Stern, contrabass

- Choral Music: Out of the Whirlwind (MS 4 -1998) ACUM; Antifonia Choir/Constantin Ripa

Four Festivals
Prayer for Israel
Magnificat Hebraica
Out of the Whirlwind

- Quartet from the East (MS 5-1999) ACUM

Quartet from the East for clarinet, violin, cello and piano
Piano Sonata
Gematria for bassoons
String Quartet

- Jacob and the Angel (MS 6-2000) ACUM

Arise, Shine!-Israel Philharmonic Orchestra/Arthur Post
Seven Voices and Sabbath - Kristyna Valouskova / Talich CO / composer
Jacob and the Angel-Das Duo(harp & piano)
Eshkolot for brass trio

- Mosaic (MS 7 – 2001) ACUM

Yobel-Israel Sinfonietta Beersheba/Uri Mayer
Bedouin Impressions-Inbal Segev, violoncello The New York Times
Terezín Songs-Kristyna Valouskova/Musica Gaudeans(fl,ob,vc,gt)
Mosaic-To Mean Electric(fl,eh,vn,vc,kbd) / Morbo
Trio Pastoral-Trio Seneca(fl,bn &pno)
Motets on Chanukah Songs/HUAC Chorale

- Messer Marco Polo (excerpts)(MS 8 - 2002) ACUM

Overture/Act II - Talich Chamber Orchestra/Max Stern
Three Songs on American Poets-K.Valouskova/H.Bartos

- Four Facets (MS 9 - 2002) ACUM

Beer Sheva for Orchestra / Israel Sinfonietta Beersheba/Nebenhaus
Nevel Asor for Harp / Brigitte Langnickel-Kohler
The Philosophy Lesson, a comic opera scene for two baritones and chamber ensemble
Galumph, a ballet - wind ensemble

- Messer Marco Polo (Act III) (MS 10 - 2003) ACUM

Kristyna Vaouskova, Toma Kreci, Jiri Kalendovsky - New Prague Ensemble/Max Stern

- For All Seasons (Youth Band Series)(MS 11 - 2004) ACUM

Music for School and Community (Jewish Traditional / Israeli Popular and Folk)
Members of the Israel Philharmonic Orchestra / Max Stern

- Jerusalem 3000 (Musicom-1996)GEMA'; Max Stern, kontrabass/Brigitte Langnickel-Kohler, harp/Reinhard Langnickel, organ

Haazinu-Song of Moses for kontrabass, harp and organ
Shepherd Song aus "Three Ancient Pieces"
Psalterion of ten Strings, harp

- The Old Testament in Music (Oliverius-1995)OSA; Kristyna Valouskova/Collegium Music Sacra/Vitezlav Podrazil

Hannah's Song of Praise

- Glorioso Classico (Lynor-2003) BIEM; Chronholm (trumpet), Oien (Soprano), Tvinnereim (clarinet), Aase (Cello), Walaas(piano)

Tamid

- Song of Ascents (2012)

Huda for piano four hands / Sara Fuxon and Bart Berman
