= Erhard Karkoschka =

German composer, scholar and conductor (1923–2009)

Erhard Karkoschka (March 6, 1923 – June 26, 2009), was a German composer, scholar and conductor. Karkoschka was born in the German linguistic enclave of Moravská Ostrava, Czechoslovakia, and subsequent to World War II became a violinist for the Bayreuth Symphony Orchestra, leading to studies in composition, musicology and conducting at the Musikhochschule in Stuttgart and the University of Tübingen, Germany. His doctoral thesis was an analysis of the compositional techniques in the early works of Anton Webern.

From 1948 until 1968, he directed the choir and orchestra at the University of Hohenheim, the former Agricultural College, and the "Hohenheimer Schloßkonzerte". In 1958, he taught at the State University of Music and Performing Arts in Stuttgart (Staatlichen Hochschule für Musik und Darstellende Kunst Stuttgart). Then in 1962, he founded his Ensemble for New Musik, which eventually broke away from the school in 1976 and was renamed the Contac-Ensemble. In 1973, he became the director of the Studio for Electronic Music in the Stuttgart Hochschule until his retirement in 1987.

Erhard Karkoschka wrote a book on musical notation, published in German, English and Japanese; "Das Schriftbild der neuen Musik", 1965. {English trans.: "Notation in New Music", London/New York 1972; Japanese: ZEN-ON Music Company Ltd., Tokyo 1978; Chinese translation 1999}. The extent of his compositions includes works for orchestra, chamber music and scenic music for various instruments, organ works, works for electronic instruments, cantatas, motets, psalms and songs, as well as "instructions" for group improvisation, and "music for musicians and audience". He died in Stuttgart in 2009.

== Works ==
- Symphonic Evolution of two personal themes (1953)
- God is a King! for mixed voices for words from the 47th, 4 and 74 Psalm (1954)
- Symphonia Choralis on "Veni Sancte Spiritus" (1957)
- Small Concerto for Violin and Chamber Orchestra (1965)
- Four stages (1965)
- Triptychon about B-A-C-H [organ] (1966)
- Variations for anything original theme and out of (1974)
- Musical fountain, multimedia project (1975)
- Teleologies (1978)
- Allklang (1978)
- Unfolding (1982/83)
- Chamber Music for Orchestra (1983)
- From death. From the rebirth, based on texts by Martin Luther (1983)
- Wind Poem (1987)
- Sound time spectacle after one of Skriptogramm from Kurt Leonhard (1988)
- Orpheus choirs for the metamorphoses of Publius Ovidius Naso (1989)
- Orpheus? Or Hades height, chamber opera (1990–92)
- Heading-between two Schubert Ländler (1994)
- N quarto: Papafrebe (1995)
- Celan Variations I-V, poems by Paul Celan (1996–98)
- Sound woodcut time in three scenes on poems by Günter Sopper (2004)

== Writings ==
- Das Schriftbild der neuen Musik. Celle: Moeck 1966. English edition (translation by Ruth Koenig): Notation in new music : a critical guide to interpretation and realisation. London [a. o.]: Universal Edition 1972. Japanese edition, (translation by Yoshirō Irino): Gendai ongaku no kifu. Tokyo: Zen'ongakufushuppansha 1978. ISBN 4-11800-181-0, ISBN 9784118001814
- Neue Musik: Analyse. Herrenberg: Döring 1976
- (with Hubert Haas) Neue Musik hören. Eine Hörerziehung mit neuer Musik in Theorie und Praxis. Textbook and cassette. Rohrdorf: Rohrdorfer Musikverlag Schmid 1981
- Essay on Webern's use of the guitar in his Opera 10, 18 and 19 Nova Giulianiad, Volume 3/Nr. 11-12/88
