= Betty Olivero =

Israeli music educator and composer

Betty Olivero (Hebrew: בטי אוליברו; born 16 May 1954) is an Israeli composer and music educator.

== Biography ==
Olivero was born in Tel Aviv, Israel to parents Dora Kapon and Eli Olivero. She graduated with a Bachelor in Music from the Rubin Academy of Music at Tel Aviv University in 1978, where she studied with Ilona Vincze-Kraus for piano and Yizhak Sadai and Leon Schidlowsky for composition. She continued her studies at Yale University where she studied under Jacob Druckman, Bernard Rands and Gilbert Amy, and graduated with a Masters in Music in 1981.

She continued her studies in Florence with Luciano Berio from 1983 to 1986 and began her develop career as a composer in Europe. She married Raffaello Majoni and had two children, and returned to Israel in 2002 to take a position as professor of composition at Bar-Ilan University, where she received her tenure in 2008. She was the first female professor of composition at an Israeli institution. In 2004-2008, she served as composer-in-residence at the Jerusalem Symphony Orchestra.

Olivero's music has been performed internationally by orchestras and ensembles including the BBC Symphony Orchestra, the Juilliard Ensemble, the Chicago Symphony Orchestra, the New York Philharmonic, the London Sinfonietta, the Israel Philharmonic Orchestra, the Israel Camerata and the Arditti Quartet.

== Honors and awards ==
- Leonard Bernstein scholarship
- Fromm Music Foundation Award (U.S.A., 1986)
- Koussevitzky Award (USA, 2000)
- Prime Minister's Prize (Israel, 2001)
- Rosenblum Award for the Performing Arts (Israel, 2003)
- Landau Award for the Performing Arts (Israel, 2004)
- ACUM Prize for lifetime achievement (Israel, 2004)

== Works ==
Olivero composes for orchestra, chamber ensemble, solo instrument and voice. Selected works include:

Instrumental music

- Pan, 5 flutes, 1984, revised, 1988
- Batnun (Double Bass), double bass and chamber orchestra, 1985
- Presenze, 10 instruments, 1986
- Ketarim (Crowns), violin, orchestra, 1989
- Adagio, chamber orchestra, 1990
- Tenuot, orchestra 1990, revised, 1999
- Sofim (Endings), piano, 1991
- Per Viola, viola, 1993
- Mareot (Mirrors), flute, violin, 1994
- Carosello, string orchestra, percussion, children’s chamber orchestra, 1994
- Kavei-avir (A Volo d’Uccello, Air Lines), 10 instruments, 1996
- Der Golem (Suites Nos. 1 and 2), clarinet, string quartet, and clarinet, string orchestra (respectively) 1997–1998
- Mizrach, clarinet, string orchestra, metal wind chimes, 1997
- Kavei-or (Light Lines), orchestra, 1999
- Merkavot (Chariots) orchestra, 1999
- Bashrav, flute, clarinet, trumpet, percussion, piano/celeste, string quartet, 2004
- Neharót Neharót (נהרות, נהרות) for solo viola, accordion, percussion, 2 string orchestras and tape (2006–2007)

Vocal music

- Cantes Amargos, female voice and chamber orchestra, 1984
- Makamat, 5 Middle-Eastern folk songs for female voice, 9 instruments, 1988
- Behind the Wall, for puppet theatre, Mezzo, 8 instruments, 1989
- Juego de Siempre (The Never-Ending Game), 12 folk songs in Ladino, female voice (alto), chamber orchestra or 7 instruments, 1991, revised 1994
- Bakashot (Supplications), clarinet, choir, orchestra, 1996
- Masken, Soprano, Mezzo, Bariton/narrator, violin, viola, cello, piano, percussion, 1999
- Achot ketana (Little Sister), Soprano, 3 solo violins, string orchestra, clarinet, 2000
- Hosha’anot, soprano, orchestra, 2000, revised 2003
- Serafim (Angels), Soprano, violin, clarinet, cello, piano, 2002
- Zimaar, Soprano, 2 violins, cello, harpsichord, percussion, 2003
- L’Ombra che porta il sogno (The Shadow That Brings Dreams), 2005

=== Discography ===
Olivero's works have been recorded and issued on CD, including:

- Cantigas Sephardies, Folkways Records, 1985
- Makamat, CD- Ricordi, 1989
- Juego de Siempre, Beth Hatefutsoth Museum, Tel Aviv, 1991
- Shtiler, Shtiler; Mode ani for Clarinet, Mezzo-Soprano and mixed choir, Pläne 1995
- Bakashot, Koch-Schwann, 1996
- Der Golem: Suite No. 1, and Der Golem: 6 Yidishe Lieder un Tantz for Clarinet and String Quartet, Pläne 1997
- Mizrach, Pläne, 1998
- Achot ketana, Angel, 2001
- Sofim, (Israeli Music Center, ACUM), 2003
