= David Radzynski =

American-Israeli Violinist

- Born: December 1, 1986 (age 39); New Haven Connecticut
- Occupations: violinist, concertmaster
- Style: Classical Music
- Spouse: Talia Horvitz
- Website: https://davidradzynski.com

David Radzynski (born December 1, 1986) is an American classical violinist and concertmaster.

== Early life and education ==
Radzynski was born in New Haven, Connecticut, to a composer father, and a pianist mother. His parents, both classical musicians, are Israeli immigrants from Poland and Lithuania. They moved to the US so Radzynski's father, Jan Radzynski could receive his doctorate. When Radzynski was a young child, the family moved to Columbus, Ohio, Jan was a composition professor at Ohio State University. David Radzynski started his musical training in both violin and piano, getting his first piano lessons from his mother, Paula.

Radzynski's musical education includes a bachelor's degree from Indiana University, a master's degree from Yale University, and an artist diploma from the International Center for Music in Park University. His violin teachers include Roland and Almita Vamos, David Kantor, Mauricio Fuks, Kevork Mardirossian, Syoko Aki, and Ben Sayevich.

== Career ==
In 2015, at the age of 28, David Radzynski was appointed as the Concertmaster of the Israel Philharmonic Orchestra under the leadership of Zubin Mehta. Radzynski served as concertmaster in the Israel Philharmonic from 2015 to 2022. In 2022, he was appointed as concertmaster of The Cleveland Orchestra. In March 2024, he resigned from his post as concertmaster. In 2025, the NDR Elbphilharmonie Orchestra announced the appointment of Radzynski as its new first concertmaster (Erster Koordinierter Konzertmeister).

As a chamber musician, Radzynski has performed with such musicians as Emanuel Ax, Pinchas Zukerman and Martha Argerich. He has also performed as guest concertmaster with the Houston Symphony, Pittsburgh Symphony, and Cincinnati Symphony Orchestras.

== Personal life ==
Radzynski is married to Israeli double-bass player, Talia Horvitz, who formerly served as principal double-bassist of the Israeli Opera.
