= Israel Music Institute =

Non-profit organization

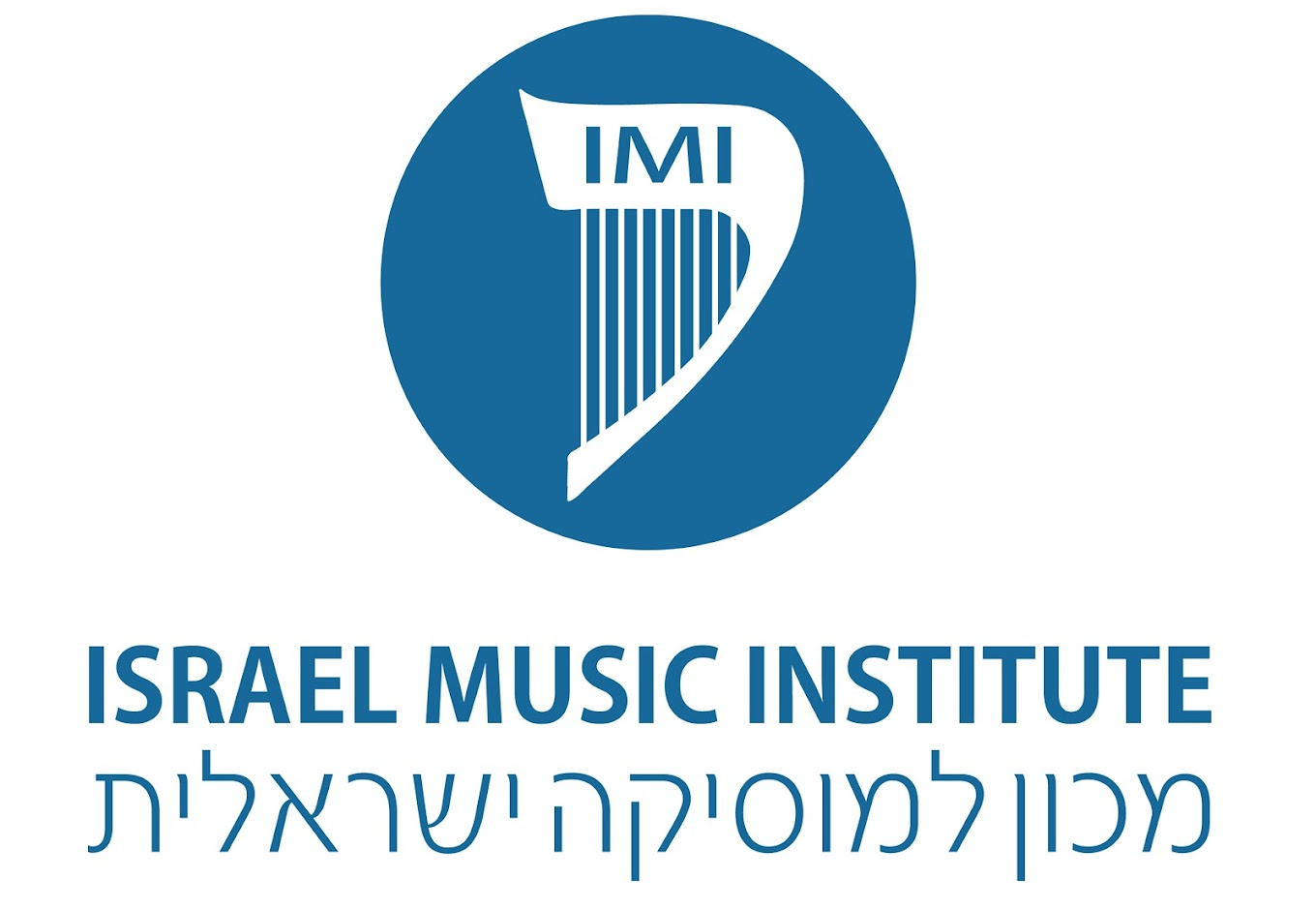
- Formation: 1961
- Type: Non-profit organization
- Headquarters: Tel Aviv, Israel
- Director: Ohad Gabay
- Affiliations: IAMIC
- Website: www.imi.org.il

The Israel Music Institute (IMI) is a non-profit organization supported by the Israel Ministry of Education and Culture. The institute was established in 1961 by the Public Committee for Arts and Culture, with the aim of publishing and promoting Israeli art music at home and abroad. IMI also serves as the Israel Music Information Center- a member of the International Association of Music Information Centers (IAMIC), maintaining reciprocal ties with some 40 member countries.

Since its establishment, IMI has acquired the rights to more than 3800 compositions by some 250 Israeli composers. The IMI catalogue contains a great variety of music: orchestral, choral, chamber and educational, as well as a plethora of articles and a number of musicological works. Both on its own label and in cooperation with several other non-profit musical institutions in Israel, IMI is active in producing CDs of Israeli art music, which it sees as an important tool for promoting Israeli composers’ works.

== History ==
The IMI was established in 1961 by the Israel Council for Culture and Arts, an adjunct of the Ministry of Education, Culture and Sports, with the aim of publishing and promoting Israeli concert music by all available means. The first chairman of the board of trustees was the late Eliezer Peri, and the first director and editor-in-chief was William (Willy) Elias, who served in this role from 1961 to 1989. Despite having no prior experience in music publishing (Elias had been a banker and a singer in the Rinat Choir), he built sound foundations for what became the prominent publishing house in Israel. He made a point of producing highly professional scores, significantly raising local music publishing standards common at the time. He also initiated an IMI bulletin, concerts, listening events, and composers' forums as part of IMI's activities.

Since 2006, the production of the Israel Music Festival has become IMI's main focus, serving as the flagship event in the Israeli concert music scene. IMI's goal was to achieve synergy between the institute's activities in publishing and recording and the festival's production.

In 2019, Ohad Gabay was appointed director, with Evgeny Oslon as editor-in-chief.

As the major publishing house for Israeli music, IMI has played a significant role in the development of the contemporary music scene.

== Publishing house ==
The Israel Music Institute is the first publicly owned music publishing house in Israel and the most influential one in the local scene. It is devoted primarily to the publication of Israeli art music, but also publishes books and booklets on Israeli music and composers, and formerly, a periodical titled IMI News. It is the only local publishing house represented internationally by approximately ten leading European and US publishers, including: Theodore Presser Company (USA, Canada, & Mexico), Albersen & Co B.V. (The Netherlands), Peermusic Classical (Germany, Austria, & Switzerland), EME (France, Belgium, Luxembourg, Spain, & Portugal), Engström & Södring Musikverlag AS (Denmark), and Český hudební fond, o. p. s. (Czechia, Slovakia, & Hungary).

Since its establishment, IMI has acquired the rights to more than 3,800 compositions by some 250 Israeli composers. IMI publishes compositions by virtually all major contemporary classical Israeli composers active since 1920. The Institute's catalogue encompasses orchestral music, chamber music, solo instrumental music, and vocal music (ranging from solo songs to choral and choral-orchestral music), electronic music, several operas and ballet scores, and music for educational purposes.

== CD label ==
The IMI produces CDs both on its own label and in cooperation with several other non-profit musical institutions in Israel; it also markets Israeli art music produced by other labels.

The institute took its first steps in music production during the 1970s with the production of several records (LPs) and a tape cassette. In 1990, the institute was invited to run an existing project, Music in Israel (MII). The collaborating organizations were the Jerusalem Music Center, Kol Israel (the Voice of Israel radio station), ACUM (Association of Composers, Authors and Publishers of Music in Israel), and the Ministry of Education and Culture. MII produced 26 CDs and was active for seven years, after which the institute continued to issue CDs independently. It has produced 61 CDs to date.
