= KammerChor Saarbrücken =

KammerChor Saarbrücken is a chamber choir based in Saarbrücken, Saarland, Germany. It was established in 1990 by conductor Georg Grün.
