= Georg Grün =

German conductor

- Occupation: Conductor

Georg Grün is a German conductor. He studied church and school music, conducting, Catholic theology and musicology at the Musikhochschule Saarbrücken and the University of Saarland, and studied organ improvisation under Jean-Pierre Leguay in Paris. He is the conductor of the chamber choir KammerChor Saarbrücken, which he established in 1990. In 2000 he became a professor at the Music Conservatory in Mannheim and has given master classes internationally. In 2012 he became a professor at the Music Conservatory Saar in Saarbrücken.
