= Amos Elkana =

American composer, guitarist, and electronic musician (born 1967)

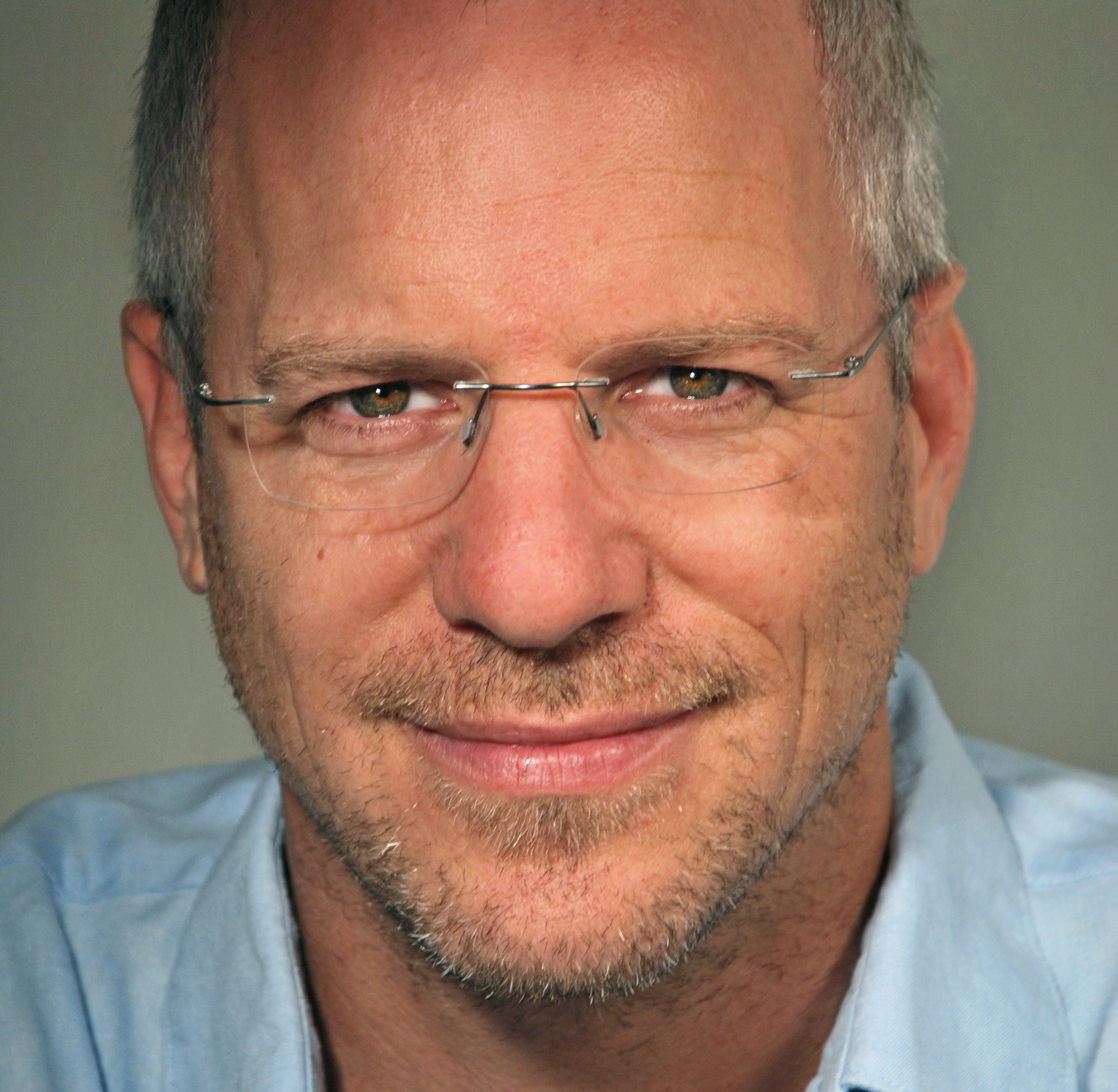

Background information
- Born: 1967 (age 58–59); Boston, Massachusetts, U.S.
- Genres: Contemporary classical, electroacoustic, experimental
- Occupations: Composer, guitarist
- Years active: 1990–present
- Website: amoselkana.com

Amos Elkana (Hebrew: עמוס אלקנה; born 1967) is a composer, guitarist, and electronic musician. His works span chamber, orchestral, electroacoustic, and multimedia forms, often integrating algorithmic and fractal processes with narrative and philosophical elements.

== Biography ==
Elkana studied composition at the New England Conservatory in Boston and Jazz guitar at the Berklee College of Music. He pursued graduate studies in computer music at Bard College, where he worked with Pauline Oliveros, George E. Lewis, and Larry Polansky.

His music has been performed by ensembles and orchestras worldwide, including Ensemble Meitar, the Israel Contemporary Players, Ensemble Reconsil (Vienna), UMZE (Budapest), the Tel Aviv Soloists, and the Israel Symphony Orchestra Rishon LeZion. His chamber and electronic works have been featured at international festivals such as the Venice Biennale, ISCM World Music Days, the Cervantino Festival (Mexico), and the MISE-EN Festival (New York).

In 2025, Elkana released Que sais-je? on New Focus Recordings, performed by Ensemble Meitar under Pierre-André Valade. The album was included on the 2026 first round Grammy ballot. His next album, Gefunden, is scheduled for release in October 2025 on NEOS.

== Style and aesthetic ==
Elkana's compositional language merges classical, electronic, and improvisatory idioms, frequently employing mathematical and fractal models to generate structural symmetry between micro and macro levels. His works often explore philosophical and intercultural questions, drawing from literature, mysticism, and science.

In a 2022 interview with Haaretz, critic Hagai Hitron described Elkana's music as "light and accessible despite its origin in complex mathematical processes", noting that his use of fractals yields "music whose micro and macro structures mirror each other".

== Reception ==
Elkana's music has been the subject of extensive critical discussion in Israel and abroad.

Critic Hagai Hitron of Haaretz described his quintet Tripp as "an attraction at the Israel Music Festival—light and accessible despite its origin in complex mathematical processes".

Composer and critic Oded Zehavi wrote that Elkana's Piano Concerto ("...with purity and light...") as "one of the best I've heard... smart, complex and very communicative", adding that it balances "deep thought with emotional clarity".

Michael Ajzenstadt of The Jerusalem Post called Elkana's Arabic Lessons "one of the most significant works composed in Israel for quite a while", describing it as "a new musical language... a lieder for the 21st century".

Noam Ben-Zeev of Haaretz characterized Casino Umbro as "pure and magnificent noise... a celebration of freedom that turns its back on convention", noting its refusal to reference local idioms and its "conquering directness".

Frank J. Oteri (NewMusicBox) noted that "Elkana's compositional aesthetics are a clear by-product of his internationalism", describing his style as "stylistically pluralistic, texturally clear, and globally resonant".

The ACUM Golden Feather Award jury commended Elkana in 2003 for "his innovative fusion of acoustic and electronic media", and later Israeli prize committees praised his "personal stamp, focused and expressive", and "refined yet sophisticated counterpoint".

== Awards ==
- ACUM Golden Feather Award for Outstanding Achievement in Composition (2003)
- Prime Minister's Prize for Music Composition (2011)
- Rosenblum Prize for Performing Arts (2012)

== Discography ==
=== Selected works ===
| Title | Year | Instrumentation / notes |
|---|---|---|
| Tru'a (Clarinet Concerto) | 1994 | Clarinet and orchestra; recorded by Richard Stoltzman and the Warsaw Philharmonic |
| Arabic Lessons | 1998 | Three voices and chamber ensemble; trilingual setting (Arabic, Hebrew, and German) of texts by Michael Roes |
| The Age of Anxiety Cycle | 2006–2008 | Installation and electroacoustic works including Lies and Lethargies; exhibited in New York, Tel Aviv, and Berlin |
| Eight Flowers | 2006–2018 | Suite for piano; performed in over ten countries; recorded by Amit Dolberg, Jihye Chang, and others |
| Casino Umbro | 2010 | Sextet; performed by Ensemble Meitar together with the Israeli Bach Soloists; recorded on Ravello Records |
| Never Mind | 2012 | Music for dance and theater by Sommer Ulrickson and Alexander Polzin; produced in Berlin and Munich |
| The Journey Home | 2013 | Opera for soloists, choir, and chamber orchestra; premiered in Munich (Gasteig) |
| Reflections | 2014–2017 | Violin and electronics; multiple performances in Israel, the UK, and Germany |
| Piano Concerto ("...with purity and light...") | 2016 | Solo piano and orchestra; premiered by the Rishon LeZion Symphony Orchestra, Amit Dolberg (piano), Sascha Goetzel (cond.) |
| Tripp | 2016 | Quintet; performed internationally (Venice Biennale, Graz, Salzburg, Mexico, New York); recorded on Albany Records (2018) |
| Prita | 2018 | Guitar and electronics; performed in Israel and the U.S. |
| Opus Focus | 2018 | Percussion and electronics; performed in Haifa, Berlin, and at the 2025 Interdisciplinary Music Technology Conference |
| Asara | 2019 | Chamber ensemble; premiered by UMZE Ensemble (Budapest) and later performed at the ISCM Festival in South Africa |
| Beyond the World's Dust | 2020 | Chamber orchestra; performed by the Tel Aviv Soloists |
| Judgment Day | 2020 | Solo bassoon; performed internationally (Tel Aviv, Belgrade) |
| It Takes Time | 2021 | Solo percussion and chamber orchestra; premiered by Israel Contemporary Players, Yuval Zorn (cond.) |
| Helix | 2021 | Trio for three electric guitars; performed by the Triple Helix Guitar Trio |
| Que sais-je? | 2023 | Sextet and electronics; premiered by Ensemble Meitar under Pierre-André Valade; released on New Focus Recordings (2025) |
| Mostly Cloudy | 2023 | Two violins; premiered by Talia Herzlich and Michael Pavia |
| Echoes of Eíkosi | 2023 | Sextet and electronics; premiered by Ensemble Meitar, Tel Aviv |
| Rainbow Warrior | 2024 | Chamber ensemble; premiered by Ensemble Reconsil, Vienna |
| Mahavishnu | 2024 | Concerto for electric guitar and chamber orchestra; premiered by the Israel Contemporary Players with Nadav Lev (solo guitar) |

=== Albums ===
| Title | Label | Year | Notes |
|---|---|---|---|
| Casino Umbro | Ravello Records | 2012 | Chamber works for mixed ensemble and electronics. |
| The Journey Home | Live DVD | 2013 | Opera premiered in Munich. |
| Tripp | Albany Records | 2018 | Quintet performed by Ensemble Meitar under Pierre-André Valade. |
| Gefunden | NEOS | 2025 | Ten solo and electronic works recorded between 2018–2024; includes Helix, Mostly Cloudy, and Beyond the World's Dust. |
| Que sais-je? | New Focus Recordings | 2025 | A 14-part work for sextet and electronics performed by Ensemble Meitar under Pierre-André Valade; included on the 2026 first round Grammy ballot. |
