= Ron Weidberg =

Israeli composer (born 1953)

Ron Weidberg רון וידברג
- Born: 1953 (age 72–73); Tel-Aviv, Israel
- Genres: Contemporary classical music
- Occupations: composer, musicologist, pianist

Ron Weidberg (Hebrew: רון וידברג; born 1953 in Tel Aviv) is an Israeli composer, musicologist, and pianist. His works have been performed by the Israel Philharmonic Orchestra and the Israel Camerata Jerusalem, among others.

== Biography ==
Ron Weidberg studied at the Tel-Aviv Academy of Music with Leon Schidlowsky and Yizhak Sadai. He later received his master's degree at Northwestern University Bienen School of Music in Evanstone, Illinois, USA. In 2000 he received his doctorate degree in musicology at Tel Aviv University Tel Aviv University. The dissertation title was: "The Evolution of Sonic Design in the Jean Sibelius's Orchestral Music 1892-1914".

== Music career ==
In 1988, he collaborated with other Israeli composers initiating a concert series titled "Music Now". In the first concert, his work "Bithonot" ("Securities") after David Avidan was premiered with vocalist Adi Etzion-Zak. The series was active for five years and premiered some 70 Israeli new works.

His works have been commissioned and performed in the framework of the Israel Jerusalem Festival, including "Introduction, Chromatic Fugue and Polk Circus" for 8 pianos in 32 hands (1984), "Fanfare for Brass Ensemble" (1986), "Pressure Songs" (1990) and the Cantata "The story of Rabbi Amnon of Mainz"(1998). His orchestral works have been performed in all orchestras in Israel, including the Israel Philharmonic Orchestra and the Israel Camerata Jerusalem.

From 1979 to 2020, Weidberg was a member of the music team at the Open University of Israel writing music textbooks and teaching music courses. In addition, he served as the head of the Department of Literature, Language and Arts (2004-2011) at the Open University and as the head of the School of Music Education at Levinsky College of Education (2011-2013) and taught at several other higher-education music institutions. Since 2015 he is being involved in projects at the Supervision of Music Education in the Ministry of Education of Israel, where he has written an anthology titled "A History of Musical Creation" for high school music students. During 1995-6 and 1998-2001 Ron Weidberg served as a chairman and board member of the board of the Israel Composers' League.

== Awards and recognition ==
- 1976-1977 - Scholarships from the Tel-Aviv Academy of Music for three pieces for piano, a string trio and a passacaglia for a string quartet
- 1982 - Clermont Prize for "Nine Trumpets"
- 1991 and 2010 - Israel Prime Minister's Awards for Composers
- 2005 - Engel Prize for the CD "Return to Tel Aviv"
- 2006 - ACUM award for Lifetime Achievement

== Selected compositions ==
The compositions are listed in the Israel Open university site, in the book "Solo Vocal Works on Jewish Themes" and in the National Library of Israel

=== Operas ===
- "Dracula", an opera in three acts (1981), for libretto by Erwin Donald Nier
- "Waiting for Godot", an opera based on the play by Samuel Beckett (1986)
- "Luischen" opera-melodrama after a short story by Thomas Mann (1988)
- "Metamorphosys" after Franz Kafka (1996), Premiered at the 1996 Acre Festival
- "Symposium" after Plato (2014), premiered by "Opera Camera", Jaffa 2014

=== Music for orchestra ===
- Symphony No. 1 (1991), premiere 1993, the Israel Symphony Orchestra Rishon LeZion conducted by Noam Sheriff
- Symphony No. 2 (1993), premiere 1993, Jerusalem Symphony Orchestra conducted by David Shalon.
- "Rhapsody", (1991) Premiere 2002, Israel Philharmonic Orchestra conducted by Yoel Levi. Also performed in Cologne, Germany conducted by Kurt Masur
- Variations on a Theme by Mozart (1991-2008), premiere 2012, the Jerusalem Symphony Orchestraconducted by Uri Segal.
- Concerto No. 1 for Piano and Orchestra (1988), Premiere 1993, Israel Symphony Orchestra Rishon LeZion conducted by Noam Sheriff.
- Concerto No. 2 for Piano, Percussion and Orchestra (2003), premiere by Revital Hachamoff and Israel Chamber Orchestra
- Violin Concerto and Orchestra (1994), premiere by Nitai Tzri and the Kibbutzim Chamber Orchestra
- Concerto for two pianos and a string orchestra following notes by Sergei Prokofiev (2005). Premiere by Silver-Garburg Piano Duo and the "Tel Aviv Soloists".

=== Songs ===
- "Lost War", five poems (1980) after David Avidan
- "securities", seven poems (1982) after David Avidan
- "Pressure Songs", four poems after David Avidan
- "Election Campaign" (1985) after David Avidan
- "Returning to Tel Aviv" (1985-2001), 26 songs after Mordechai Geldman
- "Mourner's Songs" (2002), four songs after Mordechai Geldman.
- Four songs to lyrics by Dahlia Ravikovitch ("The Window", "Two Islands to New Zealand" and more) (1987–90)
- Four songs to lyrics by Dahlia Ravikovitch ("Low altitude glider", "Singer of the land" and more) (2006-8)

=== Piano Solo, duet an ensemble ===
- "Luna Park", Piano Suite (1987)
- Impromptu No. 2 (1988), was commissioned as a mandatory piece for the Arthur Rubinstein International Piano Master Competition in 1989.
- "Stage Lights", Four-Handed Piano Suite (1990)
- "Voyage to the End of the Millennium", 24 preludes and fugues in all major and minor scales (1997-8), premiere on December 29, 1999.
- "Introduction, Chromatic Fugue and Circus Polka", for eight pianos, 32 hands. Premiered at the 1984 Jerusalem Festival.

=== Chorus ===
- "The Story of Rabbi Amnon of Mainz", Cantata for Soloists, Choir and Continuo (1994) Premiere, Chapel Nova, Glasgow, Scotland
- "Perpetual Peace", a cantata for soloists, choir and orchestra after Emmanuel Kant and other sources (2009). Premiere at the Beersheba Music Center, Hakibutz Ha'artzi Choir, 2009.

=== Chamber music ===
- String Trio (1992)
- Variations on a theme by Mozart (original version 1991)
- Sonata for cello and piano (2001)
- Quintet for Tuba and Strings (2000)

== Published works ==
Weidberg published nine Hebrew books on music.

== See also ==
- Music of Israel
