= Yitzhak Yedid =

Israeli-Australian musician (born 1971)

Yitzhak Yedid יצחק ידיד
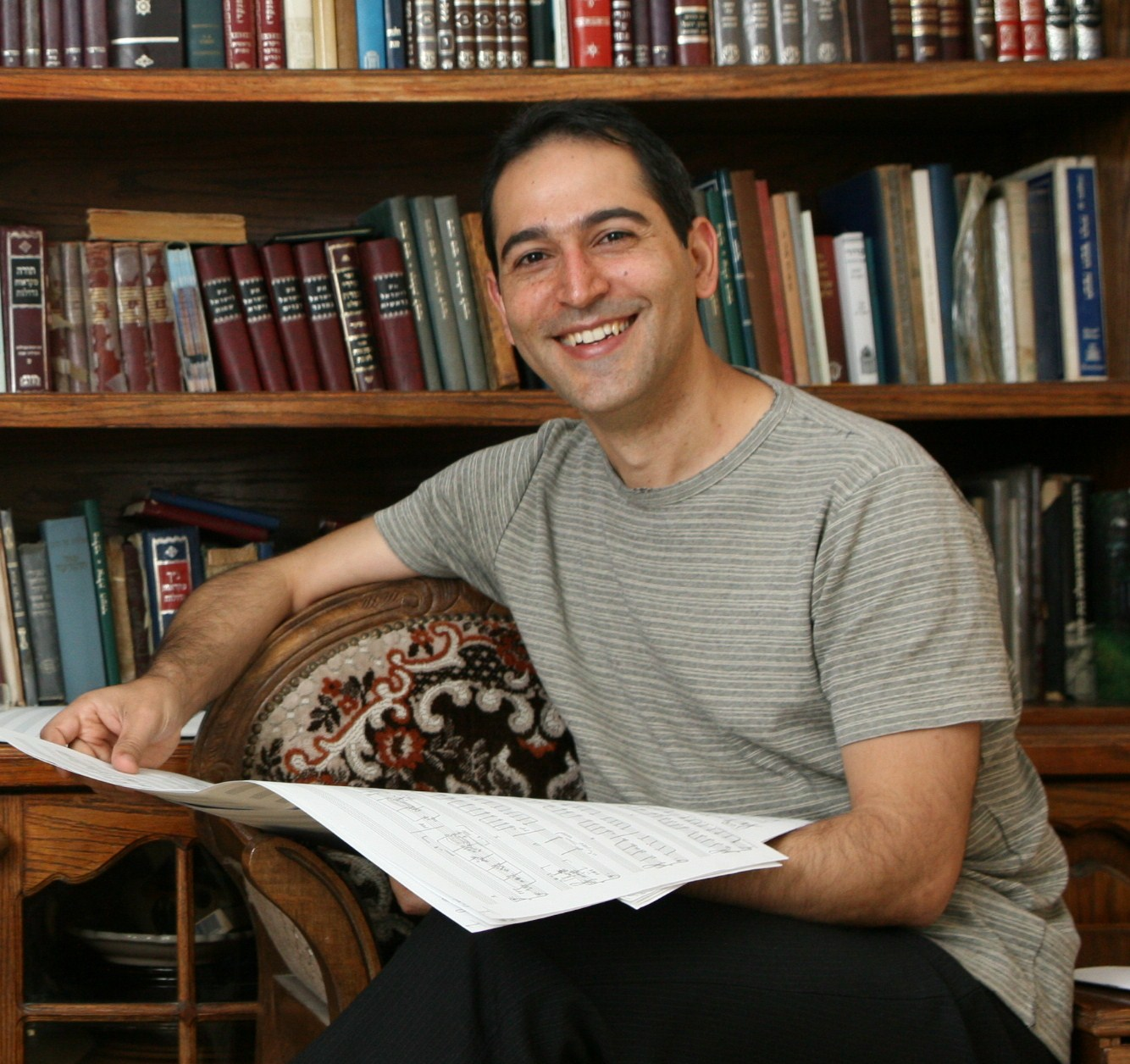

Background information
- Born: 29 September 1971 (age 55); Jerusalem, Israel
- Genres: Contemporary classical; Jewish; Jazz; Avant-garde; Experimental; Third stream; Polystylism
- Occupations: Pianist; Composer; Academic
- Instrument: Piano
- Years active: 1998–present
- Labels: Challenge Records International; Between the Lines
- Website: www.yedidmusic.com

Yitzhak Yedid (Hebrew: יצחק ידיד; born 29 September 1971) is an Israeli-Australian composer of contemporary classical music, pianist and an educator.

The recipient of numerous awards, Yedid is an Azrieli Prize Laureate in Jewish Music, a Laureate of the Landau Prize for Performing Arts, and a Sidney Myer Creative Fellow. His compositional style has been characterised as "eclectic, multicultural, and deeply personal" combining elements of Jewish cantorial music, European classical traditions, jazz and avant-garde techniques. He has been hailed as one of the most original composers on the international music scene today.

Interfaith dialogue and cross-cultural integration are central themes in his work. His compositions reflect a deep interest in Middle Eastern culture, Jewish traditions and ancient rituals, the aesthetics of classical and liturgical Arabic music, and non-Western music performance practices.

Yedid has performed concert programs featuring Judaeo-Sephardic and Middle Eastern sacred music in his solo piano recitals.

== Early life and education ==
Yitzhak Yedid was born in Jerusalem to a Jewish family of Syrian and Iraqi descent. His father was of Syrian-Jewish background and his mother of Iraqi-Jewish background. His initial formative musical experiences included attending liturgical services at his local synagogue where he imbibed the sounds and rhythms of the Syrian-Jewish Baqashot tradition.

He was also immersed in music rooted in the broader Jewish-Arabic tradition, including the performance of traditional maqamat-based repertoire. At the same time, his mother encouraged his engagement with Western classical music and Western instrumental study. He began piano lessons with a private teacher at the age of seven. During his teenage years, he developed an interest in jazz piano, and by the age of twenty he was performing his original compositions with a contemporary music ensemble he had established.

Yitzhak Yedid's musical aesthetics find their roots in the music he immersed himself in during his formative years, particularly in the Aleppo's tradition of chanting Piyyutim and Baqashot. His musical journey is also inspired by piano music and improvisation. In his compositions, Yedid seamlessly integrates various elements, including energies and dynamics, while introducing a distinctive aesthetic that departs from the conventional norms of classical stage traditions. This innovative approach adds a nuanced, and at times even provocative, dimension to his musical creations.

Yedid studied at the Rubin Academy of Music with Vyacheslav Ganelin and the New England Conservatory in Boston with Ran Blake and Paul Bley in 1997 and 1998. He moved to Australia in 2007. In 2012 he completed a PhD at Monash University, where his dissertation examined Methods of Integrating Elements of Arabic Music and Arabic-Influenced Jewish Music into Contemporary Western Classical Music.

== Career ==
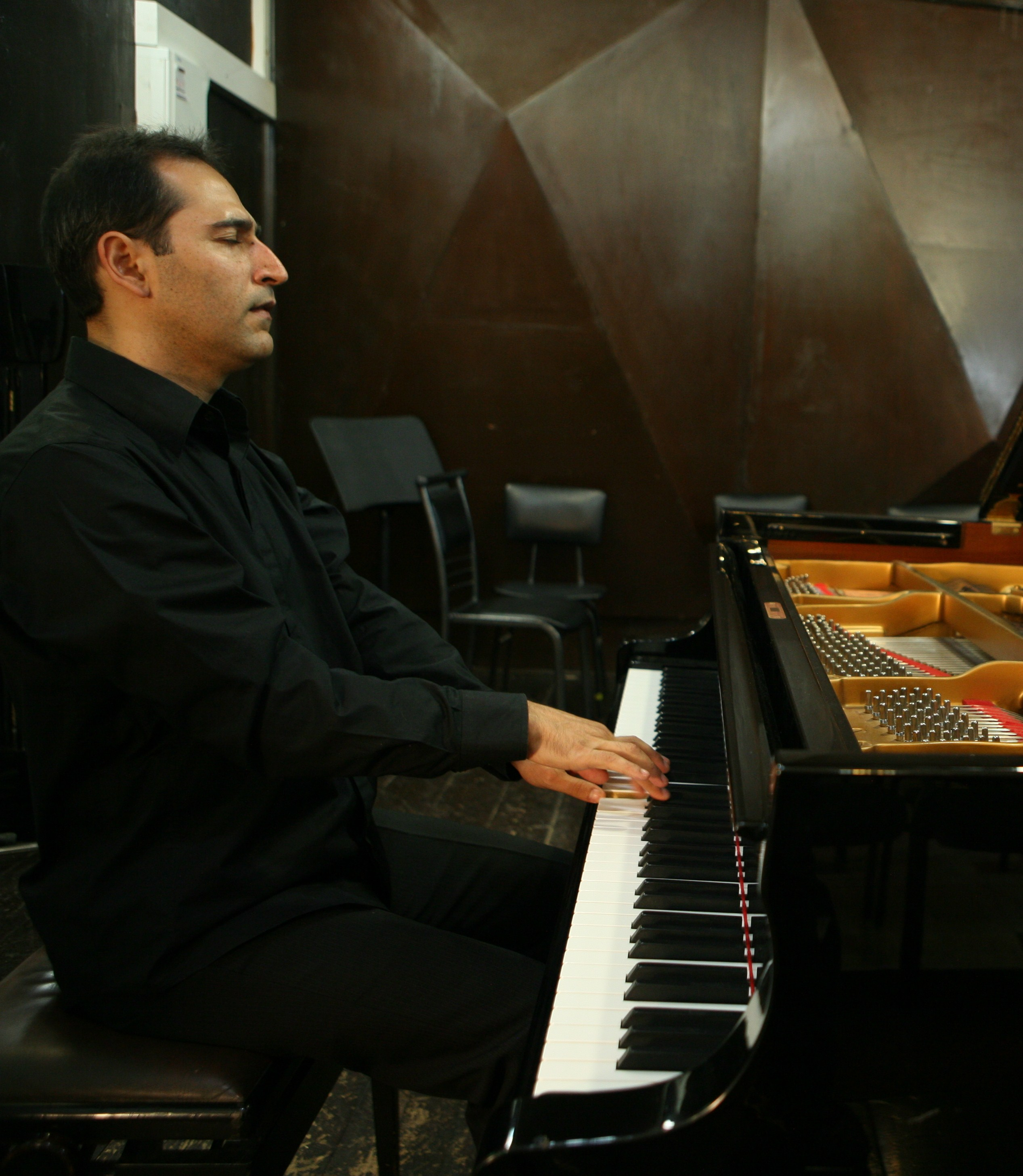
Yitzhak Yedid in 2009

Yitzhak Yedid released his debut album, Full Moon Fantasy, on the Musa label in 1999 Following its release, he performed throughout Scandinavia, including a joint recital in Sweden with Roland Pontinen. His second album, Inner Outcry, was released on Musa in 2001, Yedid was commissioned to compose the suite Tachanun for a festival in Vienna, Austria, in 2002. Tachanun has been performed many times in Israel including at the Kfar Blum Chamber Music Festival.

Myth of the Cave was commissioned by German record label Between the Lines. It was released in 2002. The five-movement piece has been performed at festivals in Germany and Austria, at the Vancouver International Jazz Festival and at the Tel Aviv Jazz Festival. It is based on Plato's allegory of the cave, about cave dwellers imprisoned in near-darkness since birth whose sense of reality is distorted. One of them escapes to the outside world, reports on what he has seen and is put to death for his revelations.

In 2002, he joined Israeli jazz saxophonist Abatte Barihun to form the duo Ras Deshen. They recorded their maiden album in September 2002, which featured a blend of Ethiopian music and Free improvisation jazz.

In 2003 Yedid composed Passions and Prayers – Sextet in homage to Jerusalem for Between the Lines. It is a technically complex and conceptually melancholy composition that premiered at the 2004 Israel Festival. The CD was released in August 2005.

Reflections upon Six Images was commissioned by a festival in Vienna Austria in 2004. The music depicts the union and division of images, colours, textures, styles and cultures inspired by the world of the imagination. The composition was performed at the Vienna festival in September 2004 and at the Etnakhta concert series in 2004 in Israel. The album was released at the end of 2005.

In 2005, Yedid composed the Oud Bass Piano Trio, performed at the Sibiu Festival in Romania, as well as in Australia, Canada, and the US in May and September 2005.

In 2006, Yedid composed Since My Soul Loved, a four movement composition for improvising players for violin, viola, cello, double bass and piano.

In 2009, Yedid composed Arabic Violin Bass Piano Trio. The work was premiered at the Jerusalem Theatre's Henry Crown Symphony Hall in March 2010. The composition is a continuation of his endeavour in Oud Bass Piano Trio (2005) integrating classical Arabic music, Arabic-influenced Jewish music and contemporary Western classical music. This trio has been composed for improvising performers.

After immigrating to Australia in 2007, Yedid expanded his output of large-scale orchestral and chamber works. His large-scale works include: Visions, Fantasies & Dances, music for string quartet, commissioned by Israel's Sapphire String Quartet; Piano Concerto (2016), commissioned by Michael Kieran Harvey and the Tel Aviv Soloists; Kiddushim & Killulim (2017) commissioned by Christian Lindberg & NK Orchestra; Delusions of War (2014) for 22 string soloists or string orchestra, commissioned by Divertimenti Ensemble and the Jerusalem Symphony Orchestra; Mandolin Concerto (2016), for mandolin and a large orchestra.

Yedid's chamber and solo works include: Chad Gadya (2017), quartet for clarinet, violin, cello & piano, commissioned by Stradbroke Chamber Music Festival; Sensations (2010) for piano, violin and cello, commissioned by Atar Trio; Angels' Revolt (2017) chaconne for solo piano, commissioned by Lev Vlassenko Piano Competition; Out to Infinity (2009) for Harp solo, commissioned by the 2009 International Harp Contest for their 50th Anniversary; The Crying Souls, Lament for Syrian Victims (2013), a cappella choir, commissioned by the Australian Voices (TAV)

Yedid has put out over ten albums as a solo act (Challenge Records International, Sony, Naxos, -btl-, Muse, MCI, and Kaleidos) and has collaborated Ethiopian-born saxophonist and vocalist Abate Berihun as the Ras-Deshen ensemble.

Yedid's works for strings include Visions, Fantasies and Dances for string quartet (2006–09), and Delusions of War for string orchestra (2014), and his compositions Oud Bass Piano Trio (2006) and 'Arabic Violin Bass Piano Trio' (2008) combine a classical Arabic instrument with Western instruments.

Some of Yedid's works have been described as Third Stream, which combines contemporary classical music with jazz improvisation. Much of Yedid's output includes slots where soloists can improvise. Yedid has often said he is delighted when performers surprise him with their inventiveness.

In his work Kadosh Kadosh and Cursed, Yedid addresses the religious dimensions of the Israeli–Palestinian conflict. The composition was inspired by the atmosphere of Jerusalem’s Temple Mount, a site sacred to both Jews and Muslims, where the Western Wall and the Al-Aqsa Mosque stand in close proximity and large numbers of worshippers gather daily for prayer. Rather than presenting a political position, the work explores the spiritual and emotional tensions associated with the site. Structured as a sequence of interconnected musical tableaux, it combines elements of Arabic classical music and Mizrahi Jewish liturgical traditions with contemporary Western compositional techniques and free improvisation. Through this juxtaposition of musical traditions, the piece reflects themes of devotion, conflict and reflection associated with the location.

== Musical style and influences ==
Yedid's creative output spans three principal areas: works for the classical concert stage, compositions that incorporate or facilitate improvisation, and pizmonim and liturgical music for synagogue use. While rooted in contemporary classical practice, his music draws upon Jewish liturgical traditions, Middle Eastern musical aesthetics, and improvisational approaches, creating connections between sacred and secular, written and spontaneous forms of musical expression. Characteristic features of his music include the use of maqam-derived melodic materials, microtonality, cantorial idioms, jazz improvisation, and contemporary classical techniques, reflecting his interest in synthesising diverse musical traditions.

Yedid has cited Arabic music as an important influence on his compositional language:

When I was a child I went to the Syrian synagogue, where you hear all the melodies in the Arabic scales. I'm using microtonality in my compositions, and also using the Hassidic and Orthodox Jewish scales. This is all with free jazz and classical music, in equal parts.

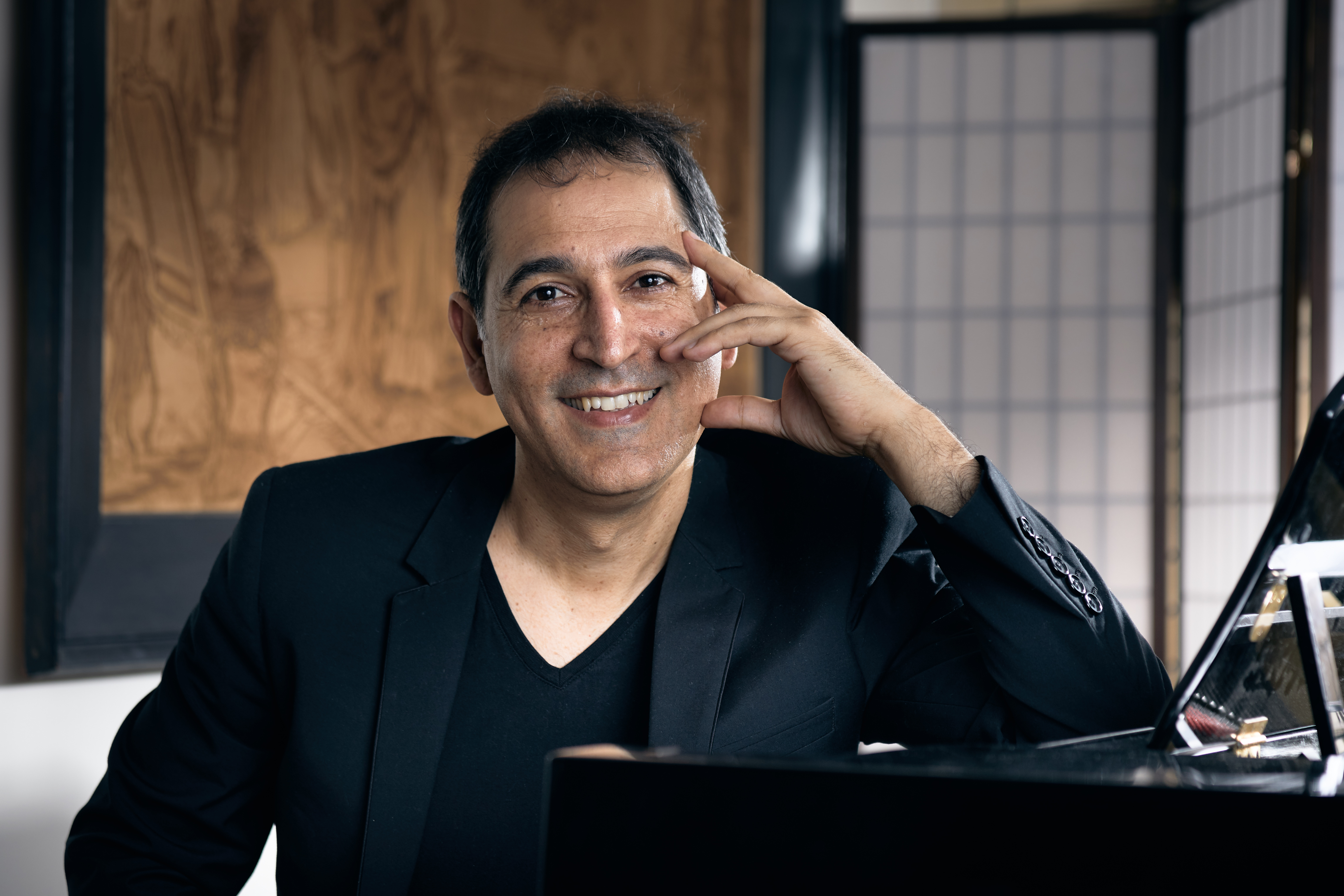
Yitzhak Yedid, 4 November 2018

Yedid's music contains a mix of elements. He says:

I'm dealing with very classical things, also with jazz and folk things—but it's not classical and it's not jazz and it's not folk. I'm using various techniques, like a painter who's trying to use all the materials he knows about. I'm trying to bring all these different elements together. My music is like a story – it's like a film or a play.

Yedid writes

In Israel, I grew up acutely aware of the tensions caused by the animosity between Palestinians and Israelis. Of profound significance were the sensory images of the shocking terror attack that occurred in a mall in central Jerusalem on December 3, 2001. The destruction and suffering caused by the two suicide bombers was devastating and continues to haunt me to this day. This attack killed eleven innocent boys including my relative 19-year-old Moshe Yedid-Levy. However, in my music, my intention is not to refer directly to experiences such as this but rather to look at Arabic and Jewish matters from a human perspective and in conjunction with philosophical and religious concerns. I am a strong believer in the power of music to bring about understanding, change and reform in societies, and perhaps also between nations. It is my wish to convey the idea of cultural pluralism.

Yedid's style of composition has been described as

eclectic, multicultural and very personal- a style that combines jazz and Jewish cantor music, classic European and avant-garde, randomness and a blend of techniques.

Barry Davis wrote in The Jerusalem Post,

Over the past couple of decades or so, Yedid has put out an almost bewilderingly eclectic range of works and recordings. His disciplinary backdrop takes in Western classical music, jazz, free improvisation, Arabic music and liturgical material. His compositions are generally viscerally and cerebrally engaging, and often visually striking, with the piano- playing role requiring a certain amount of calisthenic activity and a significant dosage of emotional and technical investment.

Yedid writes

Looking for new compositional approaches and challenging musical conventions through the synthesis of a wide spectrum of contemporary and ancient styles is what motivated my work. Intellectual conflicts such as the confrontation with philosophical matters and religious and political aspects have always been of interest, and also underlie and motivated my work. I have been influenced in particular by Béla Bartók and Arnold Schoenberg to develop a personal vision as a composer.

This correlates with what the critics write about his music: John Shand from the Sydney Morning Herald wrote in 2014 about Yedid's Myth of the Cave "a vividly expansive composition"; Noam Ben-Zeav (Haaretz) wrote in 2013 that "Yedid music is an authentic expression of new music which incorporates a wide spectrum of contemporary and ancient styles"; and Ake Holmquist (NorraSkåne, Sweden) wrote in 2004 that

Yedid integrates specific stylistic influences into a personal created unity. The manner in which he describes folkloristic influences and melancholic specific themes can remind of Béla Bartók; improvisatory float of hovering à la Keith Jarrett [...].

Yedid have shown a new direction in his later works and courage to make a commentary on international current political/religious problems that continue to find no resolution. He writes:

The music aims to make the listeners 'feel' the human suffering that the war causes, and, without assuming to have answers, to encourage them to pause for a moment and to envisage better ways than force to resolve crises. The music captures emotions of anger and fear, and feelings of sorrow, tragedy and righteousness.

== Awards and prizes ==
Yedid is the recipient of the Azrieli Foundation Prize for Jewish Music. His winning composition, Kiddushim Ve’ Killulim (Blessings and Curses), was unanimously declared the best new major work of Jewish music by the judges of the Canadian prize. Yedid received a total prize package valued at over CA$200,000, which included a world premiere performance of his work by Le Nouvel Ensemble Moderne, and a recording released on the Analekta label.

In 2018 Yedid was awarded the Sidney Myer Creative Fellowship, valued A$160,000 over a two-year period.

Yedid has received the Prime Minister's Prize for Composers in 2007 and the Landau Prize for Performing Arts in 2009. Additionally, in 2008, he received the first composition prize for Out to Infinity, a solo work for harp, at the 17th International Harp contest which led to numerous performances and recordings of the piece worldwide. Yedid has been awarded a composer-in- residence position at the Judith Wright Arts Centre (Brisbane, 2010), at the Western Australian Academy of Performing Arts (2008) and at the Gallop House in WA (2021, National Trust of Australia).

Commissions

In 2026, Yedid was commissioned to compose a large‑scale oratorio, The Valley of the Dry Bones, with financial support from the Sidney Myer Foundation, which provided $200,000 AUD for its commissioning and development. The work, scheduled for premiere in 2027 and lasting approximately 60 minutes, is scored for symphony orchestra, chorus, and narrator. The Valley of Dry Bones Oratorio is a large-scale Jewish sacred work by composer Yitzhak Yedid, continuing and extending the tradition of Jewish sacred concert music associated with composers such as Ernest Bloch, Arnold Schoenberg and Leonard Bernstein, while bringing a contemporary musical voice to the Jewish orchestral and choral repertoire.

=== Awards ===
- 2025 Sidney Myer Fellows Commission Award
- 2021 Azrieli Prize for Jewish Music
- 2021 Gallop House composer in residence
- 2019 Sidney Myer Creative Fellowship
- 2016 ACUM Prize
- 2014 Creative Australia commissioning grant
- 2012 Creative Australia commissioning grant
- 2010 Artist-in-Residence at the Judith Wright Centre of Contemporary Arts
- 2009: Landau Prize for Performing Arts Michael Landau Foundation, Israel
- 2009 Australia Council for the Arts commissioning grant
- 2007: Israel Prime Minister Award for Composers
- 2007 Award from The Center for Ethnic Music and Poetry, The Kalman Sultanik Confederation, Jerusalem Oud International Festival

== Selected works ==
=== Before 2000 ===
- Remembering Yitzhak Rabin (1999) for piano solo (ca. 7')

Commissioned by Musa Records 1999
CD released in 1999 by Musa records
Yitzhak Yedid – piano

- Tachanun (1998), Suite in one movement for piano, double bass and percussions (ca. 66')

Commissioned by Vienna music Gallery Festival, Austria
Duration: 66 minutes
Premiere Performance: September 2002, Vienna Music Gallery Festival
Yedid Ensemble (Vlad Nedelin – drums & percussions, Ora Boasson Horev – double bass, Yitzhak Yedid – piano)

=== 2000–2023 ===
- Myth of the Cave (2003) for clarinet/bass clarinet, double bass and piano (ca. 56')

Commissioned by Deutsche Structured Finance GmbH, Germany
CD released by Between The Lines
Premiere: May 2005, Frankfurt, Germany
Yedid Ensemble (François Houle – clarinet & bass clarinet; Ora Boasson-Horev – double bass; Yitzhak Yedid – piano)

- Tachanun (2005), Suite in one movement for piano solo (ca. 50')

Commissioned by Vienna Music Gallery Festival, Vienna, Austria
Premiere: Chamber Music Festival, Israel
Yitzhak Yedid – piano

- Full Moon Fantasy (2005) for piano solo (ca. 37')

Commissioned by Musa Records 2001
CD released in 1999 by Musa records; reissued in 2005

Yitzhak Yedid – piano

- Oud, Bass, Piano Trio (2006), Parts 3 (ca. 11')

Commissioned by the Oud International Festival
CD released by Challenge International Records and Between The Lines in August 2007
Premiere: 2006, Vancouver Festival
Yedid Ensemble (Michael Maroun – oud; Ora Boasson-Horev – double bass; Yitzhak Yedid – piano)

- Reflections upon Six Images (2006), Image 1, for clarinet, viola, double bass and piano (ca. 13')

Commissioned by Vienna Music Gallery Festival, Vienna, Austria
CD released by Between The Lines
Premiere: Vienna Music Gallery Festival
Yedid Ensemble (François Houle – clarinet & bass clarinet; Galia Hai – viola; Ora Boasson-Horev – double bass; Yitzhak Yedid – piano)

- Oud, Bass, Piano Trio (2006), Parts 1–2 (ca. 21')

Commissioned by the Oud International Festival
CD released by Challenge International Records and Between The Lines in August 2007
Premiere: May 2005, Sibiu Festival, Romania
Yedid Ensemble (Michael Maroun – oud; Ora Boasson-Horev – double bass; Yitzhak Yedid – piano)

- Ras Deshen (2006) for voice, saxophones, krar and piano (ca. 61')

Commissioned by MCI
CD released by MCI records
Premiere: Tel Aviv Arts Festival
Ras Deshen Ensemble (Abatte Barihun – voice and saxophones; Fentahon Malessa – krar; Yitzhak Yedid – piano)

- Nine Images (2007) for violin, cello and piano (ca. 18')

Commissioned by IBA
Premiere: March 2007, Jerusalem International YMCA, Jerusalem, Israel
Orit Wolf – piano; Nathaniel Vallois – violin; Doo-Min Kim – cello

- Chagall Project (2007), seven piano solo pieces inspired by Marc Chagall (ca. 42')

Commissioned by The Israeli Music Festival
Premiere: September 2007
CD released by Challenge International Records in September 2010
Yitzhak Yedid – piano

- Oud, Bass, Piano Trio (2007), Parts 4–5 (ca. 32')

Commissioned by the Oud International Festival
CD released by Challenge International Records and Between The Lines in August 2007
Premiere: May 2005, Sibiu Festival, Romania
Yedid Ensemble (Michael Maroun – oud; Ora Boasson-Horev – double-bass; Yitzhak Yedid – piano

- Reflections upon Six Images (2007), Images 2–3, for clarinet, viola, double bass and piano (ca. 27')

Commissioned by Vienna Music Gallery Festival, Vienna, Austria
CD released by Between The Lines
Premiere: Vienna Music Gallery Festival, Austria
Yedid Ensemble (François Houle – clarinet & bass-clarinet; Galia Hai – viola; Ora Boasson-Horev – double bass; Yitzhak Yedid – piano)

- Ethiopian voices: Psalms (2008) for three singers, Ethiopian folk dancer, alto, double bass and piano (ca. 51')

Commissioned by the Confederation House
Premiere: November 2008, Confederation House, Jerusalem, Israel
Ras Deshen Ensemble (Abatte Barihun – voice and saxophones; Esti Kenan Ofri – voice; Tzeta Germaye – voice and dance; Fentahon Malessa – krar; Ora Boasson-Horev – double bass; Yitzhak Yedid – piano)

- Clowns at Night (2008) for piano solo (ca. 16')

Commissioned by Deutsche Media Productions GmbH & Co. KG
Premiere: March 2008, Jerusalem International YMCA, Jerusalem, Israel
Yitzhak Yedid, piano

- String Quartet No 1 (2008) (ca. 14')

Commissioned by Deutsche Media Productions GmbH & Co. KG and Between The Lines
Premiere: March 2010, Henry Crown Symphony Hall, Jerusalem, Israel
Sapphire String Quartet (Janna Gandelman – violin; Roman Spitzer – violin; Amos Boasson – viola; Oleg Stolpner – cello)

- Since my Soul Loved (2008) for violin, viola, cello, double bass and piano (ca. 55')

Commissioned by Deutsche Media Productions GmbH & Co. KG and Between The Lines
Premiere: 2009 Lines Festival, Munich, Germany
Yedid Ensemble (Daniel Hoffman – violin; Galia Hai – viola; Yoni Gotlibovich – cello; Ora Boasson-Horev – double-bass; Yitzhak Yedid – piano)

- Midsummer Night's Dream (2008) for piano solo (ca. 21')

Commissioned by Deutsche Media Productions GmbH & Co. KG, 2006
Premiere: March 2008, Jerusalem International YMCA, Jerusalem, Israel
Yitzhak Yedid – piano

- Out to Infinity (2008) for harp solo (ca. 7')

Commissioned by Israel's 2009 17th International Harp Contest to celebrate its 50th anniversary, with the kind assistance of the Israel National Lottery Council for the Arts
World premiere: March 2009, American Harp Society National Harp Competition, Young Professional Division
Noël Wan, harp
Israeli premiere: October 2009, Tel Aviv, Israel
Various competing harpists

- In Memory (2009), duo for flute (piccolo and bass) and piano (ca. 13')

Commissioned by Lior Eitan
Premiere: 21 April 2010, Jerusalem International YMCA, Jerusalem, Israel
Lior Eitan – flute; Monica Fallon – piano

- String Quartet No 3 (2009) (ca. 13')

Commissioned by Sapphire String Quartet
Premiere: March 2010, Henry Crown Symphony Hall, Jerusalem, Israel
Sapphire String Quartet (Janna Gandelman – violin; Roman Spitzer – violin; Amos Boasson – viola; Oleg Stolpner – cello)

- Kidoshin (2009), duo for saxophone (tenor and soprano) and piano (ca. 26')

Commissioned by Shoham Foundation
Premiere: August 2010
Albert Beger – saxophone; Yitzhak Yedid – piano

- String Quartet No 2 (2009) (ca. 9')

Commissioned by Sapphire String Quartet
Premiere: March 2010, Henry Crown Symphony Hall, Jerusalem, Israel
Sapphire String Quartet (Janna Gandelman – violin; Roman Spitzer – violin; Amos Boasson – viola; Oleg Stolpner – cello)

- Sensations (2010) for piano, violin and cello (c. 14')

Commissioned by Atar Trio
Premiere: September 2010, Austria
Atar Trio (Tanya Beltser- violin; Marina Katz- cello; Ofer Shelley – piano)

- Piano Quintet (2010) for violin, viola, cello, double bass and piano (ca. 52')

Commissioned by Jazz Lines München 2011, Munich, Germany
Premiere: March 2011, Allerheiligen-Hofkirche, Jazz Lines München 2011l, Munich, Germany
Yedid Ensemble (Daniel Hoffman – violin; Galia Hai – viola; Yoni Gotlibovich – cello; Ora Boasson-Horev – double-bass; Yitzhak Yedid – piano)

- String Quartet No 4 (2010) (ca. 9')

Commissioned by Sapphire String Quartet
Premiere: November 2012, Jerusalem International YMCA, Jerusalem, Israel
Sapphire String Quartet (Janna Gandelman – violin; Roman Spitzer – violin; Amos Boasson – viola; Oleg Stolpner – cello)

- Through the Window of Marc Chagall (2010) for piano solo (c. 55')

Commissioned by Kawai Piano Series
Premiere: Kawai Piano Series, 2010, Ian Hanger Recital Hall, Queensland Conservatorium Griffith University, Brisbane, Australia
Yitzhak Yedid, piano

- Reflections Upon Six Images (2011), Image no 5 for double bass solo (ca. 7')

Commissioned by Ora Boasson-Horev
Premiere: Vienna, Austria
CD released by Challenge International Records in September 2011

- Arabic Violin Bass Piano Trio (2011) for Arabic violin, double bass and piano, Parts 4–5 (ca. 18')

Commissioned by IBA, Between the Lines and Challenge Records
Premiere: November 2012
Yedid Ensemble (Sami Hashibun – violin (Arabic tuning); Ora Boasson-Horev – double-bass; Yitzhak Yedid – piano)

- String Quartet No 5 (2011) (ca. 11')

Commissioned by Sapphire String Quartet
Premiere: November 2012
Jerusalem International YMCA
Sapphire String Quartet (Janna Gandelman – violin; Roman Spitzer – violin; Amos Boasson – viola,;Oleg Stolpner – cello)

- Passions and Prayers, Sextet in hommage to Jerusalem (2011) for horn, clarinet/bass clarinet, trombone, viola, double bass and piano (ca. 18')

Commissioned by Deutsche Media Productions GmbH & Co. KG and Between The Lines
CD released by Between The Lines
Premiere: Seattle 2012
Seattle Chamber Players

- Passions & Prayers, (2012) for horn, clarinet/bass clarinet, trombone, viola, double bass and piano (ca. 17')

Commissioned by Seattle Chamber Players
Premiere: August 2013, Benaroya Hall, Seattle, USA
Seattle Chamber Players

- String Quartet No 7 (2012) (ca. 11')

Commissioned by Sapphire String Quartet
Premiere: August 2013
Sapphire String Quartet (Janna Gandelman – violin; Roman Spitzer – violin; Amos Boasson – viola; Oleg Stolpner – cello)

- Haunted! (2012), Stage music for a play by Daniel Karasik (ca. 75')

Commissioned by Touchstone Theatre, Vancouver, Canada
Directed by Katrina Dunn
Premiere: Chutzpah! Festival, March 2013
Norman Rothstein Theatre, Vancouver, Canada

- String Quartet No 6 (2012) (ca. 16')

Commissioned by Sapphire String Quartet
Premiere: November 2012, Henry Crown Symphony Hall, Jerusalem, Israel
Sapphire String Quartet (Janna Gandelman – violin; Roman. Spitzer – violin; Amos Boasson – viola; Oleg Stolpner – cello)

- Arabic Violin Bass Piano Trio](2012) for Arabic violin, double bass and piano, Parts 1–3 (ca. 25')

Commissioned by IBA, Between The Lines and Challenge Records International
Premiere: November 2012
Yedid Ensemble: (Sami Hashibun – violin (Arabic tuning); Ora Boasson-Horev – double bass; Yitzhak Yedid – piano)

- The Crying Souls: Lament for Syrian Victims (2013) ca. 9')

for 6-part a cappella choir
Commissioned by The Australian Voices
Premiere: August 2013 at the Lutheran Church of the Redeemer, Jerusalem
The Australian Voices

- Psalm 1 (2014) for solo soprano (ca. 6')

Supported by the Australia Council for the Arts

- Delusions of War (2014) ca. 24'

for 22 string soloists or a string orchestra
Commissioned by Divertimenti and the Jerusalem Symphony Orchestra
Supported by the Australia Council for the Arts
World premiere: October 2014 at the Queensland Conservatorium Griffith University, Brisbane, Australia

- Violin (Arabic Violin) Concerto (2015) for violin and a large orchestra (ca. 25')

Divertimenti
Israeli premiere: February 2015 at the Henry Crown Symphony Hall
Jerusalem Symphony Orchestra conducted by Yuval Zorn
Broadcast live on Israel Broadcasting Authority's (IBA) Kol Ha'Musika station

- Zikaron (Note: "zikaron" (Hebrew: זיכרון) is a singular construct from the root ז־כ־ר (Transliteration: z-k-r) meaning "a memory" or "a thing remembered".) (2013–14), a structured improvisation for piano solo (ca. 55')

Commissioned by Kawai Piano Series
Premiere: April 2015, Kawai Piano Series, Ian Hanger Recital Hall, Queensland Conservatorium Griffith University
Yitzhak Yedid, piano

- CONCERTO FOR PIANO AND STRINGS (2016) ca. 24'

For piano and strings, or Michael Kieran Harvey
Commissioned by the Tel Aviv Soloists and Australian pianist Michael Kieran Harvey
World premiere: 6 October 2016, Ian Hanger Recital Hall, (Note: This hall was named in honour of Ian Hanger, AM QC, a distinguished Queensland lawyer who had been a longtime supporter of the Queensland Conservatorium. In 1991, when the Conservatorium was amalgamated with the Griffith University, he was elected as Chairman of the newly-created Advisory Council. During that time, he made many important contributions to the Conservatorium's development including its relocation to new premises.) Queensland Conservatorium Griffith University, Brisbane, Australia
Divertimenti (Note: Divertimenti is the premier string ensemble of the Queensland Conservatorium Griffith University. Their director is Graeme Jennings.) conducted by Graeme Jennings
Israeli premiere: 20 May 2017, Tel Aviv, Israel
Michael Kieran Harvey, piano; Tel Aviv Soloists

- Angels' Revolt (2016) (ca. 10')

Commissioned by the Lev Vlassenko Piano Competition, Queensland, Australia
Compulsory work at the Lev Vlassenko Piano Competition
Premiere: September 2017

- Chad Gadya (2017, for clarinet violin, cello and piano (ca. 12')

Commissioned by Stradbroke Chamber Music Festival
Premiere: 30 July 2017, Stradbroke Chamber Music Festival Concert 6, Dunwich Public Hall, Dunwich, North Stradbroke Island, Australia
William Stafford, clarinet; Rachel Smith, violin; Louise King, cello; Ayesha Gough, piano

- KIDDUSHIM VE' KILLULIM (Blessings & Curses), 2017

for chamber orchestra
Commissioned by trombonist/conductor Christian Lindberg and the Israel Netanya Kibbutz Orchestra
Premiere: NK Orchestra in October & November 2017

- Music for Ancient Rituals (2018, for 13 wind instruments (ca. 10')

Commissioned by ANAM
Premiere: 12 September 2018, South Melbourne Town Hall Melbourne, Australia
Eliza Shephard, Flute/Piccolo; Wally Hase, Flute; Nick Deutsch, Oboe; Owen Jackson, Oboe; Dimitri Ashkenazy, Clarinet; Mitchell Jones, Clarinet; Lyndon Watts, Bassoon; Carol Wang, Bassoon; Matthew Ventura, Contrabassoon; Marie Luise Neunecker, Horn; William Tanner, Horn; Freya Hombergen, Horn; Maraika Smit, Horn; Fabian Rusell, Conductor

- MAQA VIOLIN (2018, for violin solo (ca. 16')

Commissioned by Graeme Jennings and Karen Bentley Pollick.
Premiere: 20 July 2017, Darmstadt International Summer Courses for New Music

- LA BALLERINA DEL DIAVOLO (The Devil's Ballerina) 2020, (ca. 12')

Solo piano, with optional improvising dancer.
Commissioned by Brisbane Music Festival
Premiere: Alex Raineri, Brisbane Music Festival on 27 Oct 2023

== Publications ==
- 2001: Analysis of "Tachanun" (2001) WMG
- 2002: Myth and Music, Allegory of the Cave, CD Liner notes, Vienna New Music Festival Booklet
- 2003: Analysis of "Passions & Prayers, Sextet in Homage to Jerusalem" CD Liner notes and Israel Festival program.
- 2004: Analysis of "Reflections Upon Six Images" IBA channel
- 2005: "Psalms", Ethiopian tradition Kessim Liturgy Liner notes. Confederation House Program.
- 2005: Analysis of "Oud-Bass-Piano Trio" IBA channel, Israel
- 2006: Analysis of "Since my soul Loved" Israel Broadcasting Authority (IBA), Israel
- 2007: Oud Bass Piano Trio – New music incorporating a spectrum of contemporary and ancient styles. Sibiu Festival booklet (Romania), Vienna Festival booklet (Austria), International Oud Festival booklet.
- 2008: Analysis of "Out to Infinity"
- Curriculum Vitae

== Discography ==
- 1999 Full Moon Fantasy
- 2001 Inner Outcry
- 2002 Ras Deshen
- 2003 Myth of the Cave
- 2005 Passions & Prayers, Sextet in Homage to Jerusalem
- 2006 Reflections upon Six Images
- 2008 Oud Bass Piano Trio
- 2009 Since My Soul Loved
- 2010 Through the Window of Marc Chagall
- 2012 Arabic Violin Bass Piano Trio
- 2014 Visions, Fantasies and Dances: Music for String Quartet Sapphire String Quartet
- 2019 Angels' Revolt
- 2021 V'ahavta ("and thou shalt love)
- 2022 New Jewish Music, (Kadosh Kadosh and Cursed)

== See also ==
- Israeli music
- Jewish Music
- Contemporary Classical Music
