= Oded Zehavi =

Israeli composer, arranger and pianist

Oded Zehavi (Hebrew: עודד זהבי; born 2 February 1961) is an Israeli composer, arranger, pianist, and professor of music in the University of Haifa.

== Biography ==
Zehavi was born in Jerusalem to Alex (brother of the journalist Nathan Zehavi and the scientist Avinoam Zehavi) and Pnina Zehavi. He studied with the composers Andre Hajdu, George Crumb, and Sheila Silver and with the theoreticians Eugene Narmore and Leonard Mayer. In 1993 he completed his PhD and since then he's been active in composing music for concerts, theatre, and dance as well as for movies in cinema and on TV.

Zehavi's Music was performed by important orchestras around the world, among them the Kirov Orchestra, the London Philharmonic Orchestra, and the Israel Philharmonic Orchestra, with conductors Antonio Papen, Valery Gergiev, Leonard Slatkin, Noam Sheriff, Marek Janowski, Mendi Rodan, Stanley Sperber, and Yaron Traub.

In 1995 he founded the music dept. in the University of Haifa and served as Chair of the dept. until 2006. Zehavi is a professor in the dept and continues to teach in it. Additionally he teaches in the Rimon School of Jazz and Contemporary Music and is active in the music field in Israel.

In 2012 he started anchoring with Amnon Rubinstein a weekly program on Kol Hamusica called "Morning Music for Bus and Truck Drivers"

Zehavi is married to Keren and is a father of two.

== Awards and honors ==
- ACUM "Golden Feather" award
- Prime Minister Award for Musical composition
- Angel Award
- Rosenblum Award for Performing Arts
- Pais award 2004
