= Berlin Symphony Orchestra =

Berlin Symphony Orchestra may refer to:

- Berliner Symphoniker, founded in West Berlin in 1967
- Konzerthausorchester Berlin, previously the Berliner Sinfonie-Orchester, founded in East Berlin in 1952

== See also ==
- Berlin Philharmonic, founded in Berlin in 1882
