= Joneleit =

Joneleit is a surname. Notable people with the surname include:

- Jens Joneleit (born 1968), German classical composer
- Torben Joneleit (born 1987), Monegasque-born German footballer
