= Myth of the Cave =

Myth of the Cave is a suite in five movements for clarinet/bass clarinet, double bass and piano, composed by Yitzhak Yedid in Jerusalem, Israel, 2002, and premiered in Frankfurt, Germany, October 2002.

The fundamental idea of the composition was inspired by Plato's philosophic metaphor The Allegory of the Cave:

Human beings sit in a cave, in chains, their backs to the entrance. The shadows of things moving outside are projected by the light onto an inner wall of the cave. As the prisoners have never been outside the cave since birth, they believe these shadows are reality. One of them succeeds in freeing himself and walks outside into the light. He realizes that he has lived his whole life in the shadow of an illusion. Delighted by his discovery, he returns to the cave to communicate it to the others. Violence erupts between the one who ventured outside and those who do not want to understand. The story ends with the death of the person that had gained insight into reality.

Yedid found the allegory as an appropriate metaphor for the difficult reality of our time- a delusional reality, ignorance of the truth and of suffering in the world. The music expresses feelings of criticism, pity, prayer, mercy and a keen desire to recognize the truth.

The composition contains five movements.

The first movement named "The Crystal Hope", presents ironic hope, fragile and misleading. It opens in a declaration which will reappear in the fifth movement but reversed, symbolizing there, the delusion of the declaration.

The second movement is named "Non Believer's Prayer". As if the non-believer, who chooses to pray after all, his outcry is stronger than that of the believer. But, in spite of it, his prayer will not be fulfilled.

The third movement, "Imaginary Ritual", describes a hypothetical, imaginary sick situation, stating, that this ritual is real. The music passes through themes in an unexpected way, seeming illogical. In the improvisational parts the players were asked to describe the "walking on the edge" through borderlines breaking improvisations, neither always logical nor considerable.

The fourth movement, melody, accompanied by the piano. The second part consists of two sub-parts. The first, played in unison, leads to the second, concluding part, where the clarinet improvises contrasting the piano and the double bass, which continue the unison.

The fifth movement, "Delusion Reality", is a summary and a sober overlooking of the illusionary situation.
