= Israel Netanya Kibbutz Orchestra =

The Israel Netanya Kibbutz Orchestra (abbreviated IKO) is an orchestra established in 1970. Its offices are situated in Netanya, Israel. The Orchestra performs 120 concerts every season, presenting imaginative, up-to-date and refreshing artistic programs. Its original and experiential approach - classical pieces alongside folklore and jazz, and combinations of different styles-artistic, vocal and visual – are what build up its uniqueness. The orchestra holds a special educational program, in which 140 orchestral and chamber concerts are held for roughly 23 thousand grade school children in Israel.

The Orchestra's performances worldwide, in the United States, Mexico, South Korea, Germany, and Spain, and is dubbed successful. The orchestra's tour in South Africa was successful to the point that the orchestra was invited to tour again in the 2016 season. The directors of the orchestra are conductors Avi Ostrowsky, Noam Sheriff, Uzi Wiesel, Shalom Ronli-Riklis, Lior Shambadal, Doron Salomon, Yaron Gottfried, and Shalev Ad-El. Starting 2016-2017 season, Swedish conductor and trombone player Christian Lindberg will serve as the music director of the orchestra. The orchestra regularly performs in Beit Gabriel, Mizra, Ein HaHoresh, Givat Brener, Dorot, Nahariyya, Netanya, and Tel Aviv.

Mandoline player and conductor Shmuel Elbaz serves as the orchestra's residence conductor.

The orchestra is expected to close in August 2021 and Jerusalem Symphony Orchestra is expected to receive some of its members.
