= Yaron Gottfried =

Israeli musical artist

Yaron Gottfried ירון גוטפריד
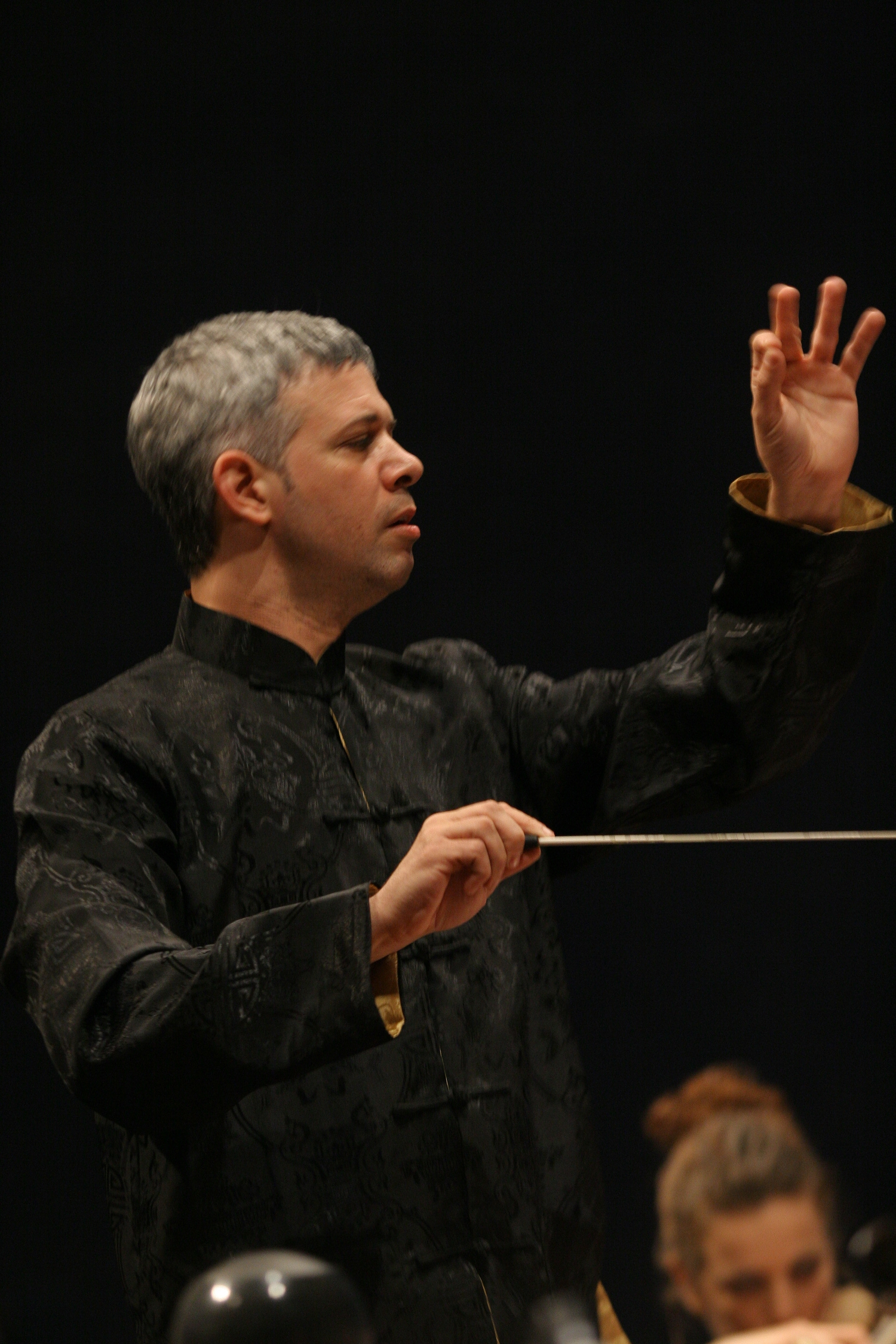

Background information
- Born: Jerusalem, Israel
- Genres: Orchestral Music, Classic, Jazz, fusion
- Occupations: Composer, Pianist, Conductor

Yaron Gottfried (Hebrew: ירון גוטפריד; born in 1968) is an Israeli conductor, pianist and composer.

== Biography ==
Yaron Gottfried was born in Jerusalem in 1968. His father is jazz pianist Danny Gottfried. At the age of 5 he started learning to play the piano. He did his military service as a pianist, arranger and assistant conductor in the air force orchestra. Gottfried was a student of Noam Sheriff in composition and Mandy Roden in conducting and is a graduate of the Jerusalem Academy of Music and Dance.

Gottfried was the chosen artist of the Foundation for Excellence in Culture for the years 2003 to 2007, he is a member of the prestigious MacDowell Artist Center in the United States, the winner of the first prize in the conducting competition as part of the Young Artist Week on behalf of the Israel Philharmonic Orchestra and the America-Israel Cultural Foundation, the winner of the first prize in the jazz composition competition held As part of the Red Sea Jazz Festival, he also won over ten years of scholarships in conducting and composing from the America-Israel Cultural Foundation.

In 2014 his CD was released called "Pictures at an Exhibition REMAKE" for jazz trio and orchestra according to Mussorgsky. The disc was released by GPR and distributed by Nexus.

As a jazz pianist he has performed with many well-known international artists including: Eddie Daniels, Eddie Gomez, Didier Lockwood, Dave Liebman, Ira Sullivan, Billy Hart, Georgie Feim, Randy Barker and many others. He performed in jazz series at the Mishkan, the Tel Aviv Museum of Art and the various jazz festivals in Israel and abroad. In the 1990s, he was a member of the jazz ensemble "Overdraw".

Until 2021, Gottfried was at the head of the trend for composing, arranging and conducting at the "Rimon" school, which he also founded in 2012, and is the artistic director of the new concert series at the Tel Aviv Museum of Art "Outside the Box". In addition, he conducted, arranged and musically directed Arab tributes to leading Israeli artists with the Israel Philharmonic, including: Yoram Gaon and the Philharmonic, Danny Sanderson and the Philharmonic, Idan Reichel and the Philharmonic, and more.

In 2021, he was appointed dean of the Ono Academic College School of Music.

== International Acclaim ==
Gottfried often performs with the Israel Philharmonic Orchestra, in October 2016 he conducted the Israel Philharmonic's eleven season opening concerts with leading soloists including Yefim Bronfman, Khatia Buniatishvili, the Prague Philharmonic Choir and soloists. In January 2015, he was invited to replace conductor Valery Gergiev with the Israel Philharmonic for the Israeli premiere of Shostakovich's Fourth Symphony in a concert that received rave reviews.

Between 2002 and 2013, he served as the musical director of the Netanya Kibbutz Chamber Orchestra.

Gottfried performs regularly in China at the Music Hall in the Forbidden City and on concert tours with orchestras in many Chinese cities. Among others, he performed in leading halls including the NCPA, the concert hall of Beijing and in 15 different cities in China.

== Awards and recognition ==
Gottfried was a recipient of the 2014 Prime Minister's Prize for Composers. His works include concertos, orchestral works, chamber works, and a cycle of works dedicated to the connection between classical and jazz, which are written for jazz trio and orchestra. His composition "La Folia" for piano was performed at the 2023 Arthur Rubinstein International Piano Master Competition by Kevin Chen, the winner of the competition.
