= Fatema Chebchoub =

Moroccan academic, actor and director

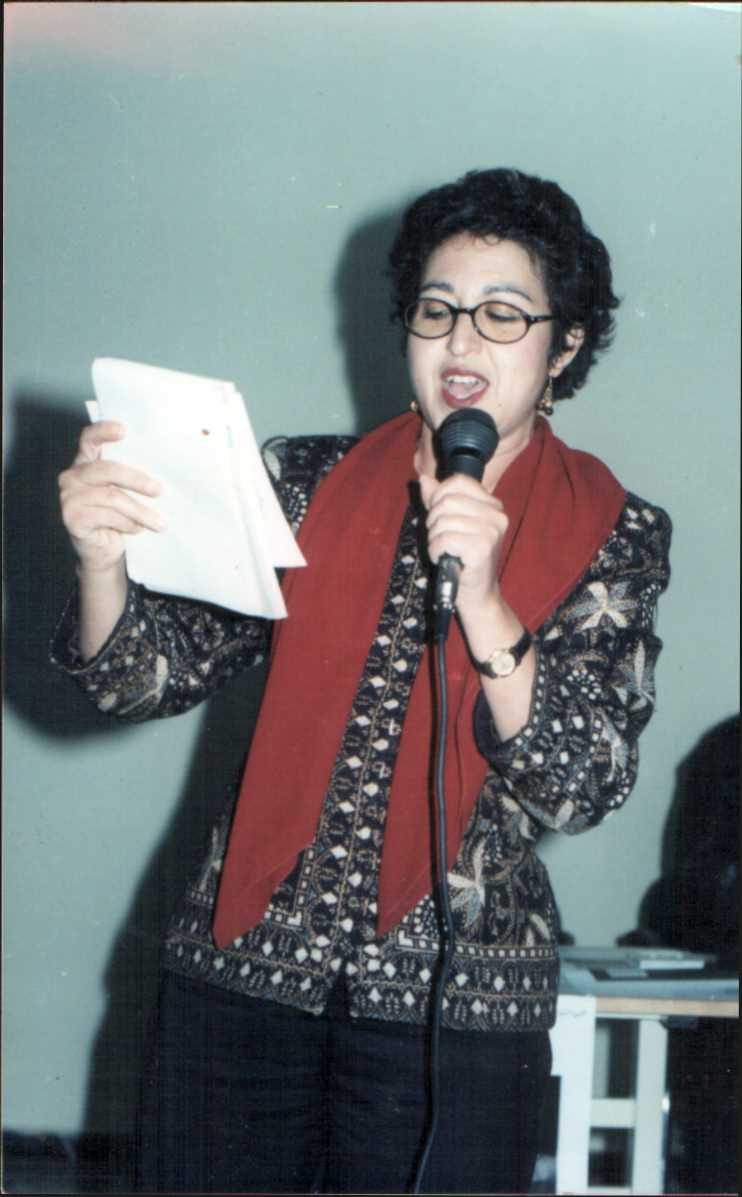
- Born: 1952
- Died: August 9, 2006 (aged 53); Skhirat, Morocco
- Other name: Al-Chebchouba
- Occupations: Academic, actor, playwright, director, activist, comedian, poet

Fatema Chebchoub (Arabic: فاطمة شبشوب; 1952 – August 9, 2006) known by her stage name, Al-Chebchouba, was a Moroccan academic, actor, director, activist, comedian, poet. She was one of the first Moroccan women to write and direct theater performances, and one of the few to incorporate elements of traditional theatrical heritage in her productions.

Chebchoub used her platform to discuss issues such as corruption, gender equality, women's literacy, and injustice.

== Personal life ==
Chebchoub was born in 1952. Her parents, both performers of the Moroccan form of popular performance known as Halqa, which is a kind of public storytelling, died while she was very young. Chebchoub never married and lived alone. Her frequent travels and her bohemian lifestyle earned her the nickname "al-Roumi" or "the Westerner" from her extended family.

== Work ==
Chebchoub began acting as a child in the 1960s and directed her first production in the 1980s. She later moved on to writing and performing one-woman shows. She was the only trained female Hlayqia, the central figure in a traditional form of public story-telling performance known as the Halqa. She performed her Halqas either as solo acts or with her troop which was known as ASYAS.

Chebchoub's Halqa works included performances called Chkouf al-Gars, Al-Matmora, Al-Abbacia and Moulat Sserr. Moulat Sserr, later renamed Tamawayt, is her most famous work. She toured internationally to perform it in countries such as Australia, the United States, and Syria.

Chebchoub also worked in television, writing a 30-episode TV series for the Moroccan channel Al Aoula which she directed and starred in, and creating a film production company.

In addition to her theater work, Chebchoub was an academic. She began by teaching French in a primary school, and later taught theater at Moulay Ismail University in Meknes. She was pursuing her PhD on stage sociology at the University of Pennsylvania, in the Department of Near Eastern Languages and Civilizations, at the time of her death.

During her time at the University of Pennsylvania, Fatema Chebchoub worked for the Linguistic Data Consortium (LDC), an international collaborative research endeavor that creates, collects, and shares linguistic data. Drawing upon her deep knowledge of Arabic syntax and grammar, Chebchoub served as an annotator for the POS (part-of-speech) tagging that helped in the categorization of the Arabic grammatical tag set that the LDC used for the Penn Arabic TreeBank project, version 3.0 (later published in 2008 by Mohamed Maamouri et al.).

While living in Philadelphia, Chebchoub also worked extensively with Jewish artists in the community. She presented a memorial service at the University of Pennsylvania held for the Israeli poet Dahlia Ravikovitch, where she translated and performed Ravikovitch's poem a A Dress of Fire.

In 2002, with a grant from the Greenfield Intercultural Center at the University of Pennsylvania, Chebchoub produced a documentary film, entitled From Heart to Heart: A Documentary of Feelings and Attitudes towards the Incidents of Sept. 11, 2001, from Arab-Americans in the Philadelphia area.

== Death ==
Chebchoub died at age 53 in Skhirat, near Rabat, in a swimming accident, on August 9, 2006.
