= Lior Shambadal =

Israeli composer and conductor (born 1950)

Lior Shambadal (Hebrew: ליאור שמבדל; born 1950 in Tel Aviv) is an Israeli composer and conductor.

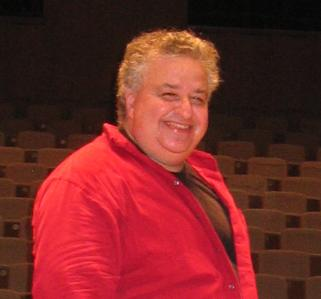
Lior Shambadal

== Study ==
Lior Shambadal studied Viola, Trombone and conducting in his native city of Tel Aviv. He studied theory and composition with Sergiu Natra. His studies led him to Carles Melles at the Salzburg Mozarteum, as well as to Hans Swarowsky in Vienna, and to conducting studies with Carlo Maria Giulini, Igor Markevitch, Sergiu Celibidache and Franco Ferrara. He continued his education with, inter alia, Electronic Music in Vienna and composition in France with Witold Lutoslawski and Henri Dutilleux.

== Work ==
=== Conducting ===
His extensive concert activity links him with orchestras in Israel and Europe:

- 1980 principal conductor of the Haifa Symphony Orchestra
- 1986–1993 Head of Israel Netanya Kibbutz Orchestra, with which he undertook numerous tours throughout Europe
- 1993 until the end of the 2000 chief musical director of the Pfalztheater Kaiserslautern, where he was also engaged in the opening a new theater
- 1997–2019, principal conductor of the Berliner Symphoniker
- 2000 to 2003 principal conductor of the RTV Slovenia Symphony Orchestra, in Ljubljana
- 2008 to 2010 principal conductor of the Bogotá Philharmonic Orchestra in Colombia

Lior Shambadal is known internationally through his CD and television productions, as well as through appearances as a guest conductor with international orchestras.

=== Composer ===
He is the founder of the composer group ensemble, Acoustic 7/11 and the ensemble for new music – Musica Nova – he has also risen to prominence as a composer in various fields, ranging from chamber music through song compositions to symphonic works.

=== Teaching ===
As a teacher he gives masterclasses for conductors including in Canada, Italy and Berlin, in which the participants learn critical aspects of conducting, studying the score, musical analysis, conducting technique and principals of working with singers.

== Discography (selection) ==
- Niccolò Paganini: Concertos for Violin and Orchestra I - VI Ae-Kyung Song Krist, Mechernich 2007
- Piano concertos. Ae-Kyung Song Krist, Mechernich 2005
- The whole world of classical music. Universal Music, Berlin 2005
- Astor Piazzolla. Adios Nonino Koch Universal, Planegg [2004]
- Magret Wolf: Kirisk. BMG Ariola München [ua] [2003]
- Double concertos. BMG Ariola München [ua] [2002]
- Elena Zaremba - portrait. BMG Ariola Hamburg / München [2001]
- The best classical music to dream. Koch International, Munich, Germany [2001]
- Robert Schumann: Overtures BMG Ariola Hamburg / München [2001]
- Rhapsody for Klezmer. Koch International, Munich, Germany [2000]
- And the angels sing. Koch International, Munich, Germany [1999]
- Giora Feidman plays Bloch, Olivero, Ora Bat Chaim. Koch International, Munich, Germany [1997]
- Trombone concertos. Claves-Verlag, Thun / Helikon Harmonia Mundi, Eppelheim, Distribution [1996]
- Franz Hummel. Gesualdo BMG Ariola Hamburg / München [1996]
- Violin concertos. Claves-Verlag, Thun / Helikon music Verlag, Heidelberg, Distribution [1993]
- Return to the south. Network Media Cooperative, Frankfurt (Main) [1992]
