= Tel Aviv Rowing Club =

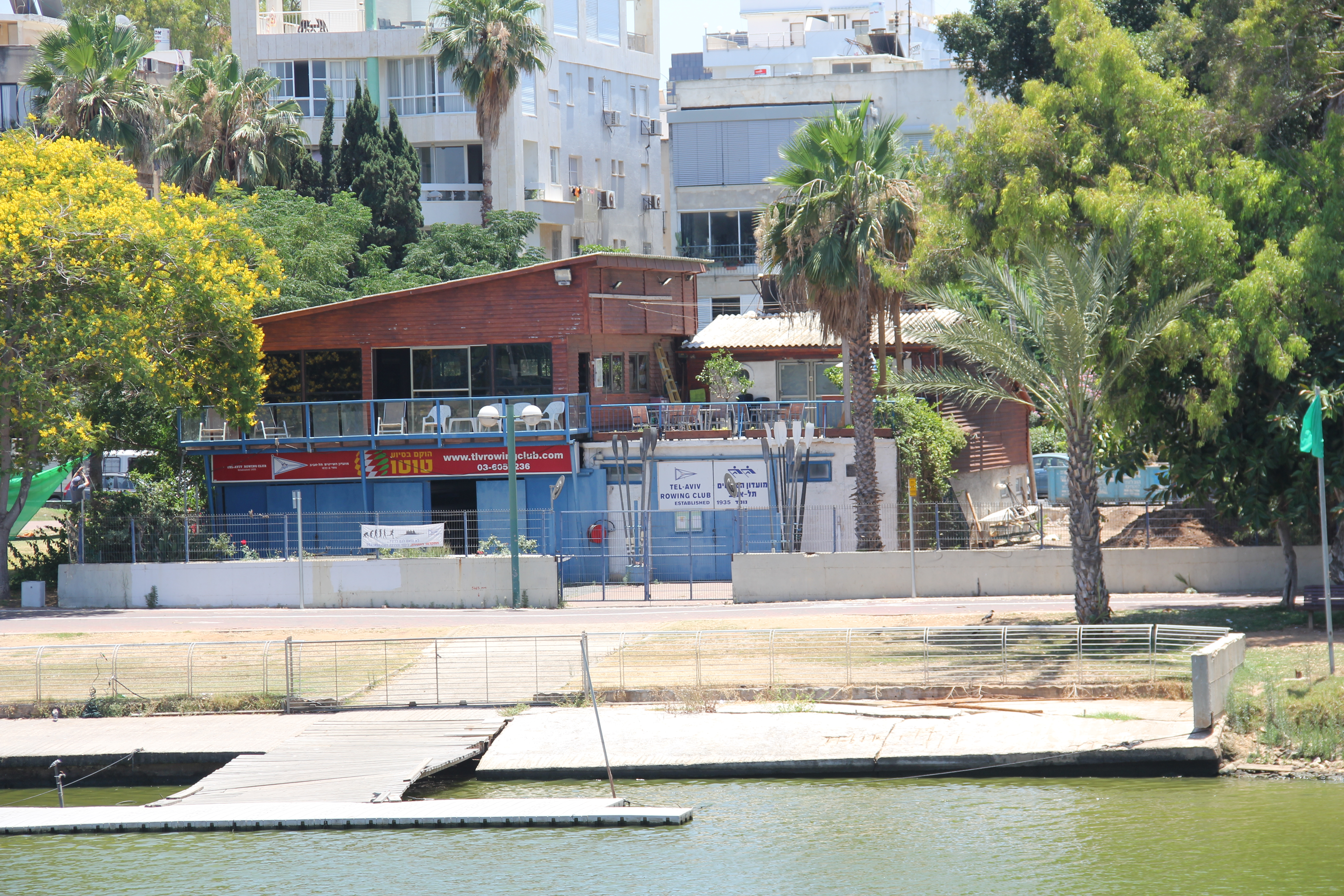
Tel-Aviv Rowing Club

Tel Aviv Rowing Club was established in 1935, on the southern bank of the Yarkon River, in Tel Aviv, Israel. The club was established mainly by Jews who fled Berlin, Germany, saving their lives from the horrors of the Nazi Regime.
