= Yuval Zorn =

Israeli conductor and pianist (born 1976)

Yuval Zorn יובל צורן
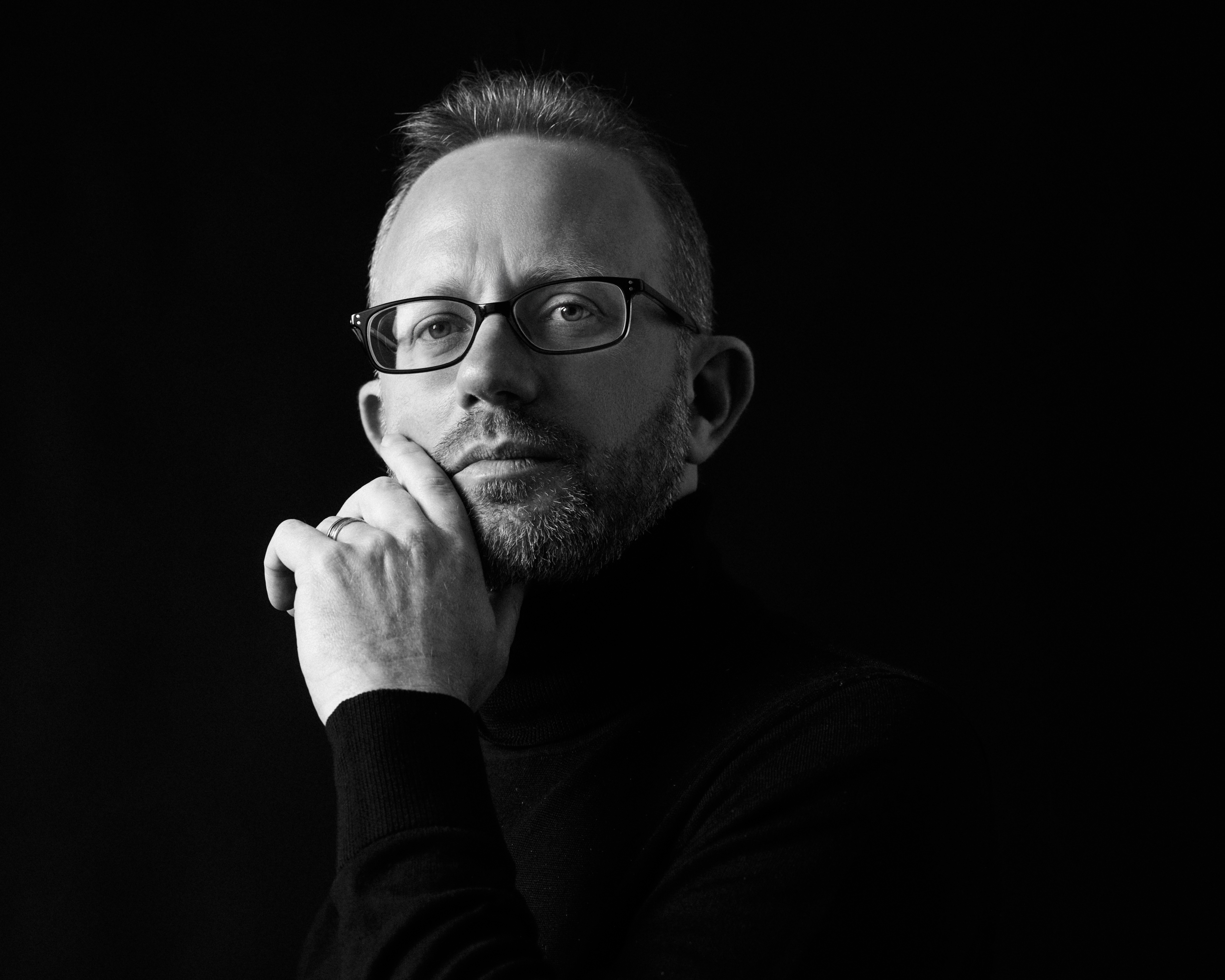
- Zorn in 2021

Background information
- Born: 1976 (age 49–50); Jerusalem, Israel
- Genres: Opera, orchestral music, classic, contemporary
- Occupations: Pianist, conductor
- Website: yuvalzorn.com

Yuval Zorn (Hebrew: יובל צורן; born 1976, Jerusalem) is an Israeli conductor and pianist with an international career spanning opera, symphonic and contemporary music.

He served as Kapellmeister (Resident Conductor) at the Oper Frankfurt from 2008 to 2012, and was a member of the Young Artists Programme at the Royal Opera House, Covent Garden (2002–2004). From 2022 to 2025 he was artistic director of the Israel Music Fest, a leading platform for contemporary music in Israel. He maintains active careers both as a guest conductor and as a solo recitalist and collaborative pianist, and has released two solo piano albums on the British label Rubicon Classics.

== Early life and education ==
Yuval Zorn was born in 1976 in Jerusalem, the son of translator and author Gabriel Zoran and bibliotherapist Dr Rachel Zoran. He studied orchestral conducting and piano at the Jerusalem Academy of Music and Dance, where his principal mentors were Professor Mendi Rodan in conducting and Professor Benjamin Oren in piano, graduating in 1999.

Following his graduation, Zorn pursued postgraduate training in London, first as a répétiteur scholar at the Royal Conservatoire of Scotland, Glasgow (1999–2000), then at the National Opera Studio in London (2000–2001), and subsequently as a trainee répétiteur at the English National Opera (2002). He joined the music staff at Glyndebourne Festival Opera and the English National Opera before being accepted into the Young Artists Programme at the Royal Opera House, Covent Garden in 2002.

== Career ==
=== Early career and the Royal Opera House ===
As part of the Young Artists Programme at the Royal Opera House (2002–2004), Zorn served as conductor, assistant conductor and répétiteur. He conducted the world première of Jonathan Browne's opera Babette’s Feast in autumn 2002, the Nitro Triple Bill in autumn 2003, and a Young Artists Showcase alongside Sir Antonio Pappano in July 2003. He worked as assistant conductor and répétiteur on productions of Lady Macbeth of Mtsensk, Falstaff, Madama Butterfly, I Pagliacci, and The Rape of Lucretia, primarily assisting Sir Antonio Pappano.

In subsequent years, prior to his appointment in Frankfurt, Zorn broadened his repertoire as assistant conductor at major houses and festivals including Glyndebourne, the Royal Danish Theatre, La Monnaie, the Aix-en-Provence Festival, the Théâtre des Champs-Élysées, and the Théâtre du Capitole, Toulouse. He assisted conductors including Daniel Harding, Iván Fischer, and Michael Schønwandt, among others.

=== Oper Frankfurt (2008–2012) ===
Following a successful debut conducting Udo Zimmermann’s Weiße Rose, Zorn was appointed Kapellmeister at the Oper Frankfurt in August 2008, a position he held until August 2012. His repertoire there encompassed a wide range of works including Die Zauberflöte, La clemenza di Tito, Così fan tutte, Le Nozze di Figaro, La Traviata, Lucia di Lammermoor, Les Contes d’Hoffmann, I Masnadieri, Owen Wingrave, Mahler’s Das Lied von der Erde, Schoenberg’s Verklärte Nacht, as well as new works. At Frankfurt he also conducted Jörn Arnecke’s Unter Eis at the Ruhr Triennale (October 2007), and the world première of Jens Joneleit’s Piero – Ende der Nacht at the Münchener Biennale with Ensemble Modern (May 2008). His Frankfurt period earned him particular critical acclaim for productions of Owen Wingrave and Mahler’s Das Lied von der Erde.

=== Guest conducting ===
As a guest conductor, Zorn has worked with a wide range of opera companies, orchestras and ensembles internationally. Opera engagements have included the Israeli Opera, the Rossini Opera Festival in Pesaro, the Oldenburgisches Staatstheater, and the Teatro Municipal in Rio de Janeiro, where he conducted a gala concert with soprano Lisette Oropesa in October 2019. Orchestras he has worked with include the London Philharmonia, the Orchestra of the Age of Enlightenment, the Bochumer Symphoniker, the Orquestra Sinfônica Brasileira, the Jerusalem Symphony Orchestra, the Israel Chamber Orchestra, and the Jerusalem Camerata.

In the field of contemporary music, Zorn has worked with Ensemble Modern, Ensemble Resonanz, Israel Contemporary Players, and Ensemble Meitar, with whom he has toured Canada, the United States, the Czech Republic, and Switzerland, including concerts at the 92nd Street Y in New York, the Contempuls Festival in Prague, and the Nouvelles Musiques Festival in Montréal. Recent highlights include a performance of Mieczysław Weinberg’s Symphony No. 21 (“Kaddisch”) with the Jerusalem Symphony Orchestra (October 2025) and the world première recording of Erich Riede’s one-act opera Riccio with the Capitol Symphony Orchestra (November 2025), due for release on the Rondeau label in autumn 2026.

From 2022 to 2025, Zorn served as artistic director of the Israel Music Fest, a platform dedicated to Israeli concert music. His programming was distinguished by a commitment to stylistic versatility, cross-cultural exchange, gender representation, and inclusion. Notable projects included a collaboration with the international music education organisation Musethica, and the facilitation of the world première of Tamar Shalit James’s opera Groundwater, a work addressing themes of love, dementia, and LGBTQ experience.

=== Career as pianist ===
Alongside his conducting career, Zorn is active as a solo recitalist, play-directing pianist, and collaborative pianist. His recital programmes have centred on French and Central European repertoire of the twentieth century, including works by Messiaen, Szymanowski, Janáček, Debussy, and Villa-Lobos, as well as music by the Palestinian-Israeli composer Samir Odeh-Tamimi. He has performed at venues including the Royal Opera House, the Wigmore Hall, Oper Frankfurt, the Piano Salon Christophori in Berlin, and the Institut Français de Roumanie in Timișoara.

His debut solo album, Landscapes (Rubicon Classics, 2020), was praised by Gramophone and the BBC Music Magazine. His second album, Masques Images Hommages (Rubicon Classics, 2025), featuring works by Szymanowski, Debussy, and Rameau, received further critical acclaim.

=== Teaching and education ===
Zorn served as a teacher of conducting at the Jerusalem Academy of Music and Dance from October 2016 to July 2022, and as music director of the Mendi Rodan Symphony Orchestra at the academy from 2019 to 2022. He also conducted several opera studio productions at the academy. He has been a visiting vocal coach for the Young Artists Programme at the Royal Opera House since 2004, and has worked with the David Goldman Programme for gifted young musicians at the Jerusalem Music Centre since 2011. He has given conducting masterclasses at the Contemporary Encounters Festival (2015, 2016) and worked with Ensemble Meitar's TEDARIM and CEME education projects.

== Discography ==
Discography
Year	Title	Repertoire	Label	Role
Due 2026	Riccio (Erich Riede)	World premiere recording	Rondeau	Conductor
2025	Masques Images Hommages	Szymanowski, Debussy, Rameau	Rubicon Classics	Pianist
2020	Landscapes	Messiaen, S.O. Tamimi, Janáček, Villa-Lobos	Rubicon Classics	Pianist
2007	Alma Española	Spanish songs (with Idit Arad, soprano)	Meridian Records	Pianist

== Personal life ==
Zorn is married to architect Ori Ronen; together they are the fathers of one daughter. Outside music, he is a member of the Tel Aviv Rowing Club and an enthusiastic cook.
