= Noam Sheriff =

Israeli composer, conductor, educator and arranger

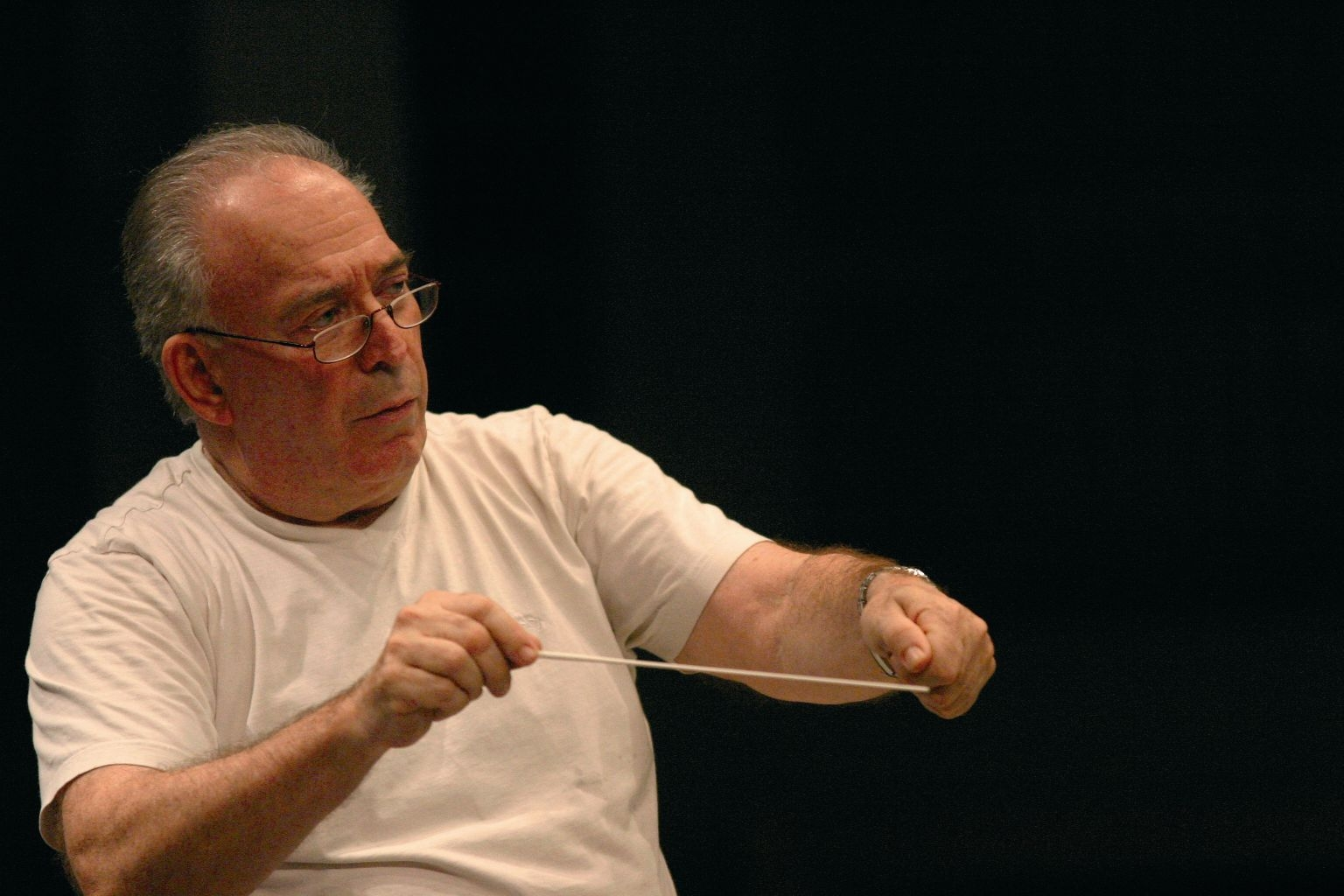

Noam Sheriff (Hebrew: נׂעם שריף; 7 January 1935 – 25 August 2018) was an Israeli composer, conductor, educator, and arranger.

Noam Sheriff was Artistic Director of the Kibbutz Chamber Orchestra, Music Director of the Israel Rishon LeZion Symphony Orchestra, Professor of Composition and Conducting at the Samuel Rubin Academy of Music at Tel Aviv University, and Director of the Academy from 1998 to 2000. He was also artistic director of the Israel Chamber Orchestra and the Haifa Symphony Orchestra.

== Awards ==
- 1991: ACUM Prize for his life's work.
- 2003: EMET Prize for music.
- 2011: Israel Prize for music.

== Personal life ==
Noam Sheriff was married to the Israeli composer Ella Milch-Sheriff from 1982 until Noam Sheriff's death in 2018.

Cultural offices
Preceded by Avi Ostrowsky	Music Director, Israel Netanya Kibbutz Orchestra; 1973-1982	Succeeded by Uzi Wiesel
Preceded by Shimon Cohen	Music Director, Israel Symphony Orchestra Rishon LeZion; 1989-1995	Succeeded by Asher Fisch
Preceded by Salvador Mas Conde	Music Director, Israel Chamber Orchestra; 2002-2005	Succeeded by Gil Shohat
Preceded by Cristian Mandeal	Music Director, Haifa Symphony Orchestra; 2004-2013	Succeeded by Zhong Xu
