= Berliner Symphoniker =

German symphony orchestra

The Berliner Symphoniker (Berlin Symphony Orchestra) is a German symphony orchestra based in Berlin, Germany.

== History ==
The orchestra began its performing activity on 1 September 1967 as Symphonisches Orchester Berlin, under the auspices of the Berliner Orchestervereinigung e.V., after the merger of two independent orchestras, the Berliner Symphonisches Orchester and the Deutsches Symphonie-Orchester. Carl August Bünte, who had been chief conductor of the Berliner Symphonisches Orchester, was the first chief conductor of the newly formed ensemble, and held the position until 1973. From 1967 to 1990, the orchestra performed as the Symphonisches Orchester Berlin. In 1990, the orchestra was renamed the Berliner Symphoniker.

In 2004, the Berlin Senate withdrew its support of the orchestra, which subsequently entered bankruptcy proceedings. Subsequently, the Berolina Orchester eV association took over management of the orchestra. Since 2019, the current Intendantin (managing director) of the orchestra is Sabine Völker, the first woman to hold the post.

The longest-serving chief conductor of the orchestra was Lior Shambadal, from 1996 to 2019. In April 2021, the orchestra announced the appointment of Hansjörg Schellenberger as its next chief conductor, effective with the 2021–2022 season. Schellenberger served as chief conductor and artistic director until summer 2023.

== Concert tours ==
- 1996: Brazil
- 1998–2000: USA, Egypt, United Kingdom, Spain, Switzerland, Italy
- 2001: Italy, United Kingdom, South America
- 2002: Japan
- 2004: Japan, Hungary, Czech Republic, Frankfurt am Main
- 2005: South Korea, China, Switzerland, Italy, Greece
- 2006: Spain, Switzerland
- 2007: Argentina (Buenos Aires; International Festival Ushuaia), Italy, Japan, China
- 2008: Festival de Mallorca, Japan, China
- 2010: Japan, China
- 2012: Japan, Vietnam, China, France, Greece
- 2013: Andorra, China
- 2014: Japan
- 2015: Italy, Croatia, China, Israel
- 2016: Japan, South Korea, France, Mallorca
- 2018: Japan, Austria
- 2019: Italy, China
- 2022: Dubai, Austria, Netherlands
- 2023: Japan
- 2024: Dubai
- 2025: Portugal, Japan

== Chief conductors ==
- Carl August Bünte (1967–1973)
- Theodore Bloomfield (1975–1982)
- Daniel Nazareth (1982–1985)
- Alun Francis (1989–1996)
- Lior Shambadal (1996–2019)
- Hansjörg Schellenberger (2021–2023)

== Guest conductors and soloists ==
The orchestra has worked with a range of guest conductors and soloists. Conductors associated with the Berliner Symphoniker have included Wolf-Dieter Hauschild, who worked with the orchestra as permanent guest conductor until 1988, as well as Emmanuel Krivine, Yan Pascal Tortelier, Franz Welser-Möst and Nayden Todorov.

Soloists appearing with the orchestra have included René Kollo, Siegfried Jerusalem, David Geringas, Jean-Jacques Kantorow, Leontyne Price, Giora Feidman and Luciano Pavarotti.
