= Jens Joneleit =

German composer (born 1968)

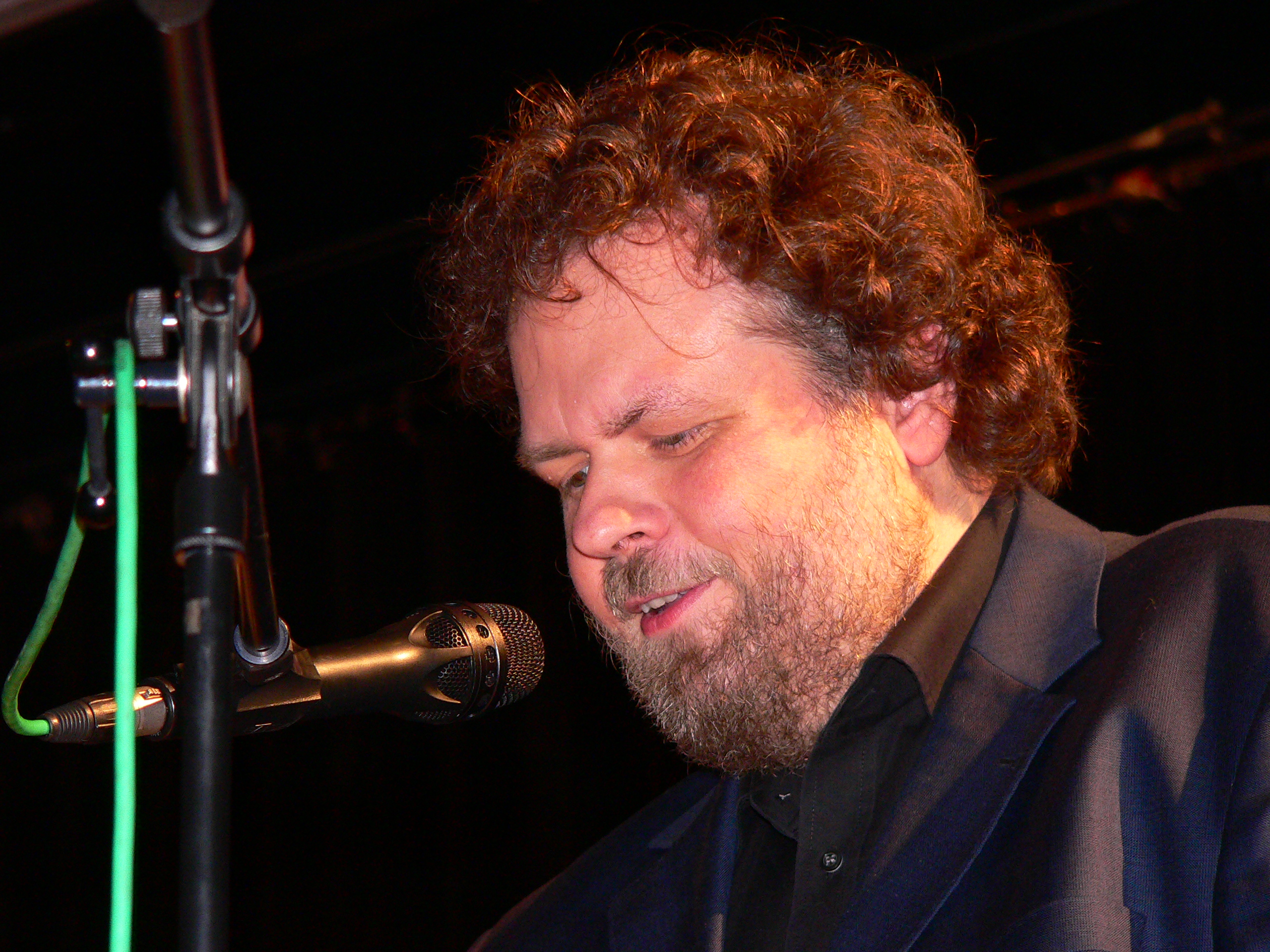
- The composer in 2010
- Born: Jens Gerd Joneleit; 17 September 1968 (age 58); Offenbach am Main, Germany
- Education: University of South Dakota
- Occupation: Composer
- Awards: Ernst von Siemens Composer Prize

Jens Gerd Joneleit (born 17 September 1968) is a German composer, known for his operas.

== Early life and education ==
Joneleit was born in Offenbach am Main in Germany. His parents both played piano, and he learned music theory when he was only seven years old. In 1975 he started taking percussion lessons, and performed in a local marching band, and local rock and jazz groups. Around 1984 he taught himself piano and started composing his own music. He graduated from the Gymnasium in 1988, and for the next two years completed his community service. He moved to the United States in 1990 to study at the University of South Dakota, graduating with a Bachelor of Fine Arts with majoring in Art and a minor in Music in 1992. He then entered graduate school in painting at the University of Wisconsin, and completed his Master of Fine Arts in 1997.

== Musical career ==
From 1991 Joneleit studied music with Bartók's pupil Lewis Hamvas in Yankton, South Dakota, and in Vermillion, South Dakota with Robert Marek (1915–1995) and Stephen Yarbrough (born 1946). From 1994 he studied in Madison, Wisconsin with Joel Naumann, a pupil of Stefan Wolpe. In 2003 he hired Roscoe Mitchell of the Art Ensemble of Chicago for a recording session. The composer objects to reading only these names in his biographies, saying: "I was also a pupil of Mahler, Nono, Boulez, Stockhausen, of Bruckner and Wagner. Famous jazz players influenced me: Miles Davis or the Art Ensemble of Chicago with Roscoe Mitchell or Lester Bowie." Joneleit describes the influences on his music in greater detail:

Anton Bruckner's sound monoliths and his ability to draw from silence; from here onwards, the line towards New Music, to the gesture of granting, letting flow, the way Morton Feldman teaches; but also to the gesture of rebellion which no one has so purely, so passionately brought to life as Luigi Nono. From his works, I draw my conviction that all music, even instrumental music, is Song - elementary human expression. Dogmas exist only to be overthrown: I liked Franz Hummel's attitude towards this notion long before we knew each other and I like that about Wolfgang Rihm, too. The courage to be free, to have one's own voice: that is of utmost importance.

== Operas ==
Joneleit's opera Der Brand. Proscaenium emblematicum on a libretto of Michael Herrschel after Andreas Gryphius, premiered in 2007 in Stuttgart with the Ensemble Modern, conducted by Franck Ollu. His opera Piero – Ende der Nacht. Hörstück für ein Theater der wandernden Gedanken und Klänge (Piero – End of the Night. Aural piece for a theater of wandering thoughts and sounds) was premiered at the Munich Biennale in 2008. The libretto of Michael Herrschel is based on passages from Alfred Andersch's Die Rote. The opera was first performed by the Ensemble Modern, conducted by Yuval Zorn, in the Muffathalle as a coproduction with the Oper Frankfurt and the Experimentalstudio Freiburg. Joneleit's opera Metanoia. Über das Denken hinaus (Metanoia: beyond thinking) on a libretto of René Pollesch, based on motifs from Nietzsche's Die Geburt der Tragödie aus dem Geist der Musik (The Birth of Tragedy Out of the Spirit of Music), premiered in 2010 in the Schillertheater to open the temporary stage of the Staatsoper Unter den Linden. Christoph Schlingensief had staged the opera, but died before the premiere. Daniel Barenboim conducted, with singers Graham Clark, "Charaktertenor", Annette Dasch, "Sopran", Daniel Schmutzhard, "Bassbariton", Alfred Reiter "Bass" and Anna Prohaska, "Koloratursopran". The voice types (character tenor, soprano, bass-baritone, bass, coloratura soprano) equal the roles.

Premiere	Title	Description	Libretto and source
3 Feb 2007, Theaterhaus Stuttgart/ ECLAT Festival Neue Musik Stuttgart	Der Brand	Proscaenium emblematicum for four voices and ensemble	Michael Herrschel, after the Kirchhofs-Gedanken (Cemetery Thoughts) by Andreas Gryphius, 1656
30 Apr 2008, Muffathalle/ Munich Biennale	Piero – Ende der Nacht		Michael Herrschel, loosely after the novel Die Rote by Alfred Andersch
3 Oct 2010, Schillertheater/ Staatsoper Unter den Linden	Metanoia. Über das Denken hinaus	Opera in one act	René Pollesch, after elements of Die Geburt der Tragödie aus dem Geist der Musik of Friedrich Nietzsche

== Instrumental music ==
Joneleit's first recording was in 2002 chamber music, played by the ensemble Gelber Klang, music for ensemble Il canto l'interno...nell'intimo and Io sol uno, a string quartet, a piano trio and Abbild, a work for cello solo.

Joneleit composed for the 25th anniversary of the Ensemble Modern a work for 27 soloists, Le tout, le rien, premiered by the ensemble in Dresden in 2005, conducted by Franck Ollu. The title's contradiction (roughly translated from French as "all, nothing") is described:

Grabbing vs. releasing, self-assertion vs. surrender: the title juxtaposes seemingly irreconcilable opposites. But it is precisely this sense of antithesis that defines the force-field mapped out by Jens Joneleit's cycle for 27 soloists

In 2009 Joneleit composed Dithyrambes for orchestra.

== Awards ==
Joneleit was awarded the Ernst von Siemens Composer Prize in 2006. Pierre Boulez delivered the laudatory address. Joneleit received the "Kulturpreis 2009" of his hometown Rodgau.
