= Rosenblum Prize =

The Rosenblum Prize for the Performing Arts (Hebrew: פרס רוזנבלום לאמנויות הבמה) is a biennial Israeli award presented by the Tel Aviv-Yafo Municipality to recognizing excellence in theater, dance, and music. Established through a dedicated foundation, the prize is named in memory of Hannah and Gottlieb Rosenblum. First awarded in 1990, the prize was presented annually until 2010 (with the exception of 1998) before shifting to its current biennial schedule.

== Awards ==
The prize is currently awarded to recipients in three tiers:

- Lifetime Achievement
- Outstanding Artists and Creators
- Promising Emerging Artists
