= ACUM Awards =

The ACUM Awards (Hebrew: פרסי אקו"ם, Prasei Akum) are annual honors presented by the Society of Authors, Composers and Music Publishers in Israel, abbreviated as ACUM, to recognize achievements in Israeli music and literature established in 1958. Through 2003, the award was known as the "Golden Feather".

The awards are divided into two main categories: music prizes covering classical, traditional folk, and contemporary genres, and literary prizes for Hebrew poetry, fiction, and children's literature. Winners are selected by independent committees of writers, musicians, and critics. In addition to recognizing commercial performance, such as radio airplay and streaming data, the ceremony includes lifetime achievement awards to honor long-term contributions to Israeli culture.

== Awards ==
According to the statute, the following annual awards are presented:

Hebrew Song & Pop Music

- Ehud Manor Award (Lifetime Achievement for a Lyricist)
- Naomi Shemer Award (Lifetime Achievement for a Composer)
- Yossi Banai Award (Lyricist of the Year)
- Sasha Argov Award (Composer of the Year)
- Moshe Wilensky Award (Song of the Year)
- Uzi Hitman Award (Album of the Year)
- Inbal Perlmutter Award (Discovery/Breakthrough of the Year)
- Yair Rosenblum Award (Arranger/Producer of the Year)

Literature & Poetry

- Dahlia Ravikovitch Award (Lifetime Achievement for Writing)
- Shlomo Tanai Award (for poetry/fiction manuscripts during the literary cycle)
- Dvora Omer Award (for children’s/youth literature manuscripts}
- Nathan Yonathan Award (for anonymous poetry submissions)
- Aaron Ashman Award (for anonymous fiction submissions)

Classical & Concert Music

- Paul Ben-Haim Award (Lifetime Achievement for a Composer)
- Menachem Avidom Award (Achievement of the Year for Original Concert Music / Classical Composition)
- Mark Kopytman Award (creative encouragement grant for unreleased classical works)

In addition, a number of special Board of Directors Awards may be given out.
