= Avi Ostrowsky =

Israeli musician and conductor

Avi Ostrowsky אבי אוסטרובסקי
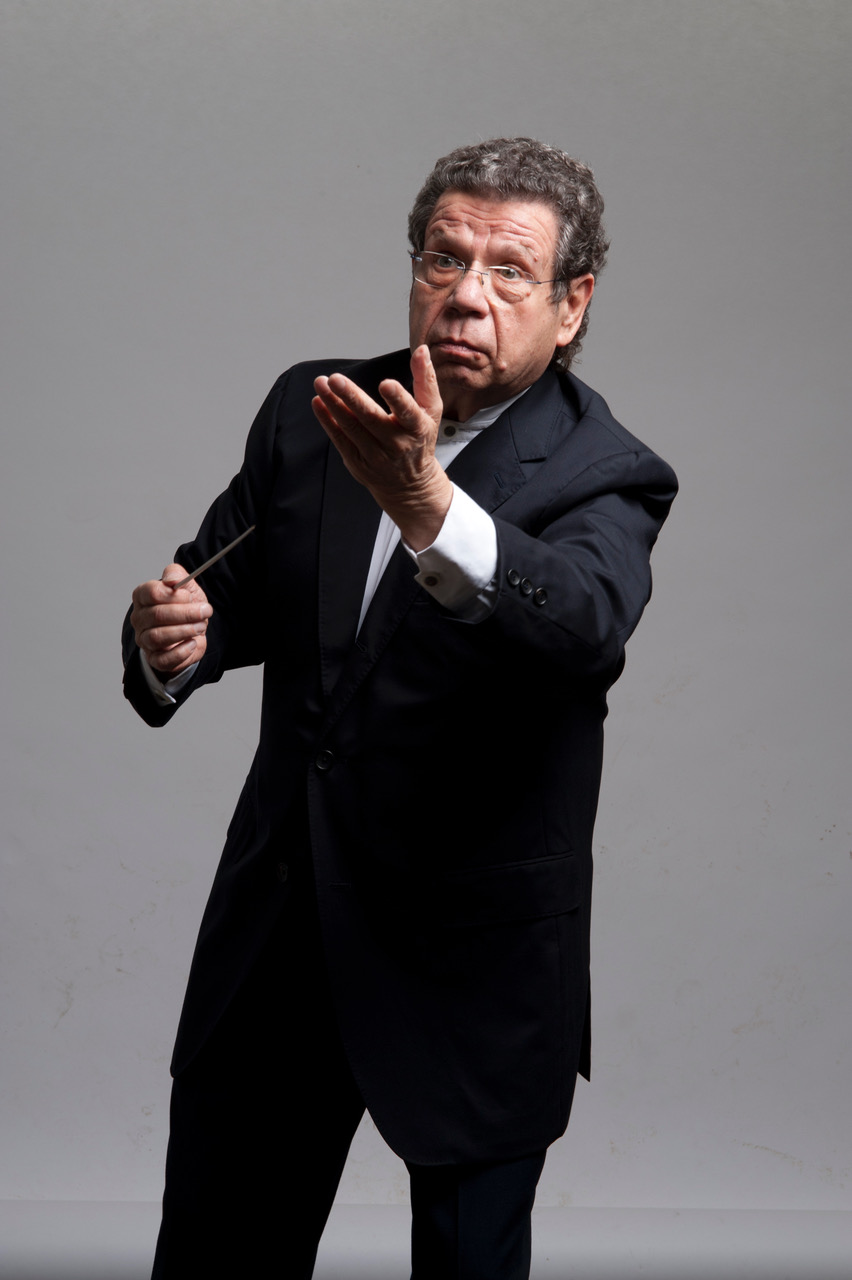

Background information
- Born: 1939 (age 86–87); Mandatory Palestine

Avi Ostrowsky (Hebrew: אבי אוסטרובסקי) is an Israeli musician and conductor.

== Early life and education ==
Avi Ostrowsky was born in 1939 in Mandatory Palestine. In his youth, Ostrowsky planned to live in a kibbutz, and chose to study mechanics in this pursuit. During his studies, he became attracted to music and formed a choir whose members he led without any knowledge of musical notes and music theory. At age 17, he met conductor Gary Bertini and, with his encouragement, studied for two years at the Music Teachers College in Tel Aviv. He then went on to study conducting and composition at the Rubin Music Academy in Tel Aviv with Maestro Gary Bertini and Professor Mordechai Seter.

Ostrowsky worked as a mechanic in a garage to finance his music studies. When he enlisted in the army, Maestro Bertini asked that he be placed as his successor in the formation of the Army Choir.

Upon graduation and after graduating from the army, Ostrowsky joined Kibbutz Lahav. In 1965, Ostrowsky was appointed music director and conductor of the "Kol Israel Radio Choir" in Jerusalem. In 1966, he received a scholarship from the America-Israel Cultural Foundation which allowed him to study with the renowned Professor Hans Swarowsky at the Academy of Music and Performing Arts in Vienna. He completed the four-year program in two years, graduating in 1968. He also studied with Maestro Franco Ferrara in Italy. In May 1968, while still a student in Vienna, Ostrowsky won the first prize at the Nikolai Malko Competition for young conductors in Copenhagen.

== Music career ==
In 1968, before returning to Israel from his studies in Vienna, Ostrowsky accepted an invitation from Frank Peleg to be appointed music director and permanent conductor of the Haifa Symphony Orchestra in Israel. In 1970, he established the Israel Netanya Kibbutz Orchestra and served as its music director and permanent conductor. In 1973, he founded the Israel Sinfonietta Beer Sheva, which he directed until 1978, when he was named music director and permanent conductor of the Antwerp Philharmonic Orchestra. In 1989, he was elected music director and permanent conductor of the Norwegian Radio Symphony Orchestra in Oslo. In 1998, Ostrowsky was asked by the management of the Israel Netanya Kibbutz Orchestra to return and serve again as the music director and permanent conductor.

== Selected recordings ==
- Igor Stravinsky – The Rite of Spring (Le Sacre du Printemps), Petrushka, Firebird, Psalm Symphony.
- Shostakovich – Symphonies 1, 5, 6, 7, 8, 9, 10, 14, 15.
- Karol Szymanowski – Stabet Mater.
- Gustav Mahler – Symphonies 1, 2, 3, 4, 5, 6, 9.
- Johannes Brahms – Symphonies 1, 2, 3, 4, Ein Deutsches Requiem.
- Dvorak – Stabat Mater, Requiem
- Hector Berlioz – Symphonie fantastique, Messe solennelle
- Franz Schubert – Symphonies 4, 8 "Unfinished", 9.
- Ludwig van Beethoven – Symphony No.3 "Eroica", Symphony No.7.
- Wolfgang Amadeus Mozart – Requiem, Great Mass in C minor K.427, Missa Solemnis in C minor K.139.

== See also ==
- Music of Israel
