= Noam Ben-Zeev =

Israeli music critic and journalist

Noam Ben-Zeev (Hebrew: נעם בן-זאב; born 1954) is an Israeli music critic and journalist, educator and lecturer, active in the music scene in Israel since the beginning of the 1990s.

== Music journalism ==
Ben-Zeev was the music critic and music journalist of Haaretz daily newspaper from January 1992 (member of the editorial staff since 1996), until November 2015. During that time he had published more than 5000 articles, reviews, columns, editorials, news items and interviews. In his journalistic writing, he concentrates on 20th Century and contemporary music, the sociological aspects of music, music education, and Israeli and Jewish music. He has traveled and reported from London, Berlin, Palermo, New York, Beijing, Istanbul, Seoul, Paris, Rome and Seville.

In November 2015, after resigning Haaretz, Ben-Zeev was appointed musical director at Elma Arts Center, Zichron Yaakov, Israel.

== Teaching, writings, films ==
Since 1990 he has been teaching music history and music education in various schools, among them Alon High School for the Arts and Sciences (1990–2006), the University of Haifa, and Levinsky College of Music. Since 2011 he is a music lecturer at Sapir Academic College.

In addition to his Haaretz publications he has written three books: a concise textbook on the history of music called Five Glances at Music (1998, Sal Tarbut Artzi); An Israeli Tune (Hebrew "Mangina Yisraelit", 2009, Hakibbutz Hamehuchad publishing house), on music, politics and society in Israel and Palestine; and "The Concertmaster" (2015), the biography of violinist and teacher Chaim Taub.

He cooperated with director Reuven Hecker as a musical advisor on two documentary films about music: Luciano Berio (2000; 59 min., video), a portrait of the late contemporary Italian composer Luciano Berio (1925–2003), shot throughout Italy and at the Salzburg Festival; and Go in Peace, Rain (2007; Hebrew: Lekh Leshalom Geshem; 90 min., video), a film which follows an ancient Jewish liturgical melody and thus reflects a diminishing musical culture of Sephardic Synagogue music. This film was shot throughout Spain, France, Greece, Bulgaria, Turkey, Romania, England, the Netherlands, and Italy.

Noam Ben-Zeev has translated to Hebrew the novel Lord Jim by Joseph Conrad. It was published by Modan Publishing House in July 2023.
