= Dahlia Ravikovitch =

Israeli poet, translator and peace activist

- 'דליה רביקוביץ
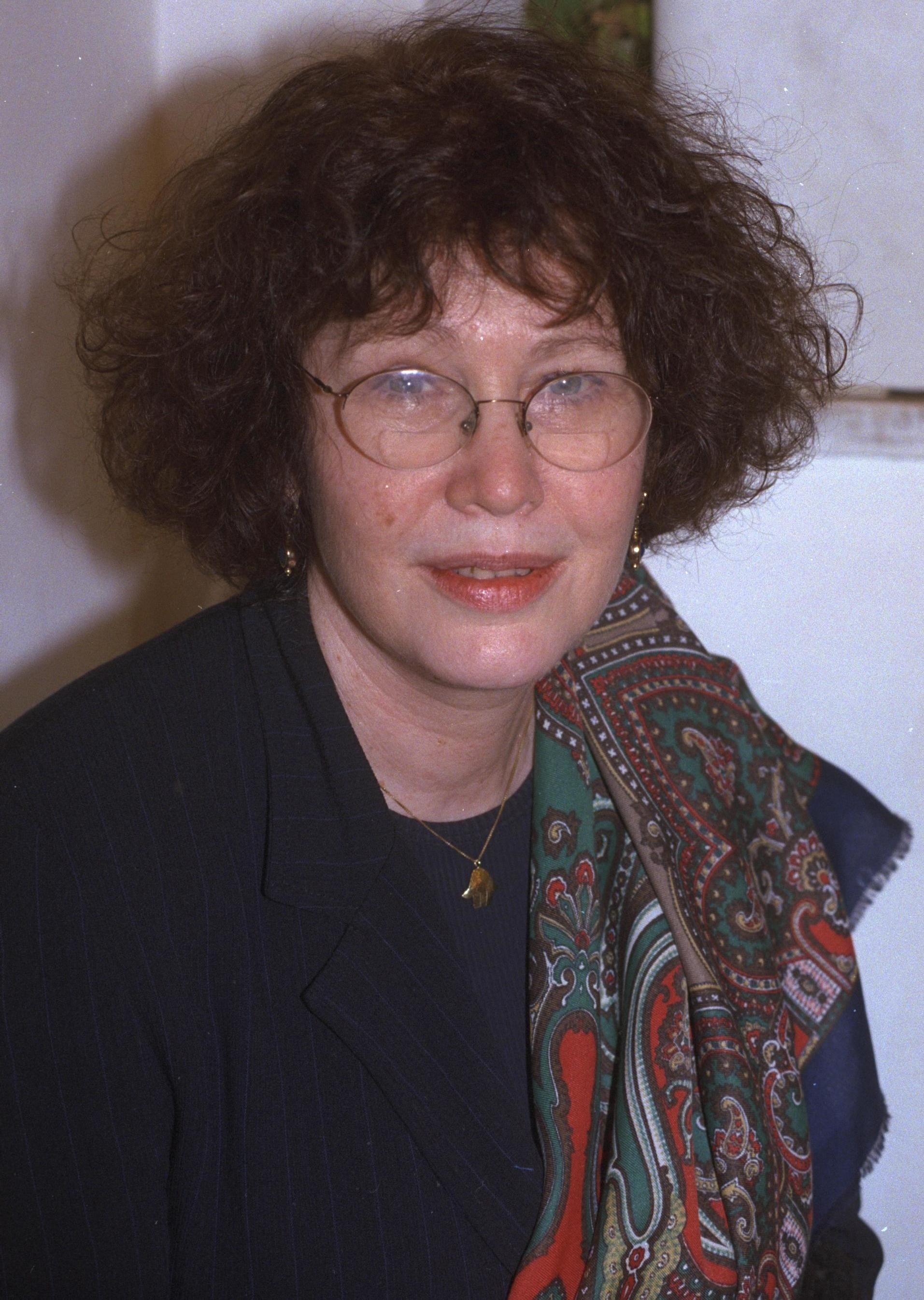
- Dahlia Ravikovitch, 1997
- Born: November 17, 1936; Ramat Gan, British Mandate of Palestine
- Died: August 21, 2005 (aged 68); Tel Aviv, Israel
- Occupation: Poet

Dahlia Ravikovitch (Hebrew: דליה רביקוביץ'; November 17, 1936 – August 21, 2005) was an Israeli poet, translator and recipient of the Israel Prize for Poetry in 1998.

== Biography ==
Ravikovitch was born in Ramat Gan on November 17, 1936. She learned to read and write at the age of three. Her father, Levi, was a Jewish engineer originally from Russia who arrived in Mandatory Palestine from China. Her mother, Michal, was a teacher who came from a religious household. When Dahlia was six, her father was run over and killed by a drunken driver. She moved to Kibbutz Geva with her mother but did not fit into the collectivist mentality and at 13 moved to a foster home in Haifa, the first of several foster homes. It was in those formative years in Haifa that she wrote her very first poem, "Painting", which contrasted the blue of the seaside landscape to the yellow and grey of her inner world.

Ravikovitch married at 18, but divorced after 3 months. Her subsequent marriages also ended in divorce. She has one son, Ido Kalir. After completing her service in the Israel Defense Forces, she studied at the Hebrew University of Jerusalem. She worked as a journalist and high school teacher. She translated works of W. B. Yeats, T. S. Eliot and Edgar Allan Poe, and the book Mary Poppins into Hebrew. Ravikovitch was active in the Israeli peace movement. From her home in central Tel Aviv she collaborated with artists, musicians and public figures seeking peace, equality and social justice.

During the last years of her life, she suffered from severe bouts of depression. On August 21, 2005, Ravikovitch was found dead in her apartment. Initial reports speculated the cause of death to be suicide, but the autopsy determined the cause to be sudden heart irregularities.

== Literary career ==
Ravikovitch's first poems appeared in the Hebrew language poetry journal Orlogin (Hourglass), edited by Avraham Shlonsky, and it was Shlonsky who encouraged her to pursue writing as a career. Her first book of poetry, The Love of an Orange, published in 1959, established her as one of Israel's leading young native-born poets.

Her earlier poetry shows her command of formal technique without sacrificing the sensitivity of her always distinct voice. Although never totally abandoning traditional poetic devices, she developed a more prosaic style in the latter decades of her work. Her popular poem published in 1987, "The End of a Fall" (also called "The Reason for Falling") is from this period. Like many of Ravikovitch's poems, it may strike the reader as, at once, poignant, metaphysical, disturbing, and even political: "If a man falls from a plane in the middle of the night / only God can lift him up...". In her book Haifa: City of Steps literary critic Nili Gold has argued that Haifa and its landscape are crucial to understanding Ravikovitch's early poetry, most notably "Painting" and "Day Unto Day Uttereth Speech". Gold has also argued against the popular interpretation of Ravikovitch's poem "Hovering at a Low Altitude" as a political poem, instead contending that it should be understood as a personal, lyrical one.

In all, Ravikovitch published ten volumes of poetry in her native Hebrew. In addition to poetry, she contributed prose works (including three collections of short stories) and children's literature, and translated poetry into Hebrew. Many of her poems were set to music. Her best known poem is Booba Memukenet (English: Clockwork Doll).

Her poems are taught in schools and universities. Scholars at the University of Pennsylvania in Philadelphia sponsored a "Memorial in Piano, Poetry, and Song" in her honor on March 21, 2006; one of the performers at this event was the late Moroccan poet and performer, Fatema Chebchoub. Several of Ravikovitch's poems were turned into popular songs. Her poetry has been translated into 23 languages.

== Awards ==
- In 1987, Ravikovitch was a co-recipient (jointly with Moshe Dor) of the Bialik Prize for literature.
- In 1998, she was awarded the Israel Prize for poetry.
- In 2005, she won the Prime Minister's Prize.
- Other awards include the Brenner Prize and the Shlonsky Prize.

== Books in English translation ==
- Dress Of Fire (1978)
- The Window (1989)
- Hovering at a Low Altitude: The Collected Poetry of Dahlia Ravikovitch (2009)

== See also ==
- List of Israel Prize recipients
- List of peace activists
