= Nurit Yaari =

Israeli theatre scholar, dramaturg, director and consultant (1947-2025)

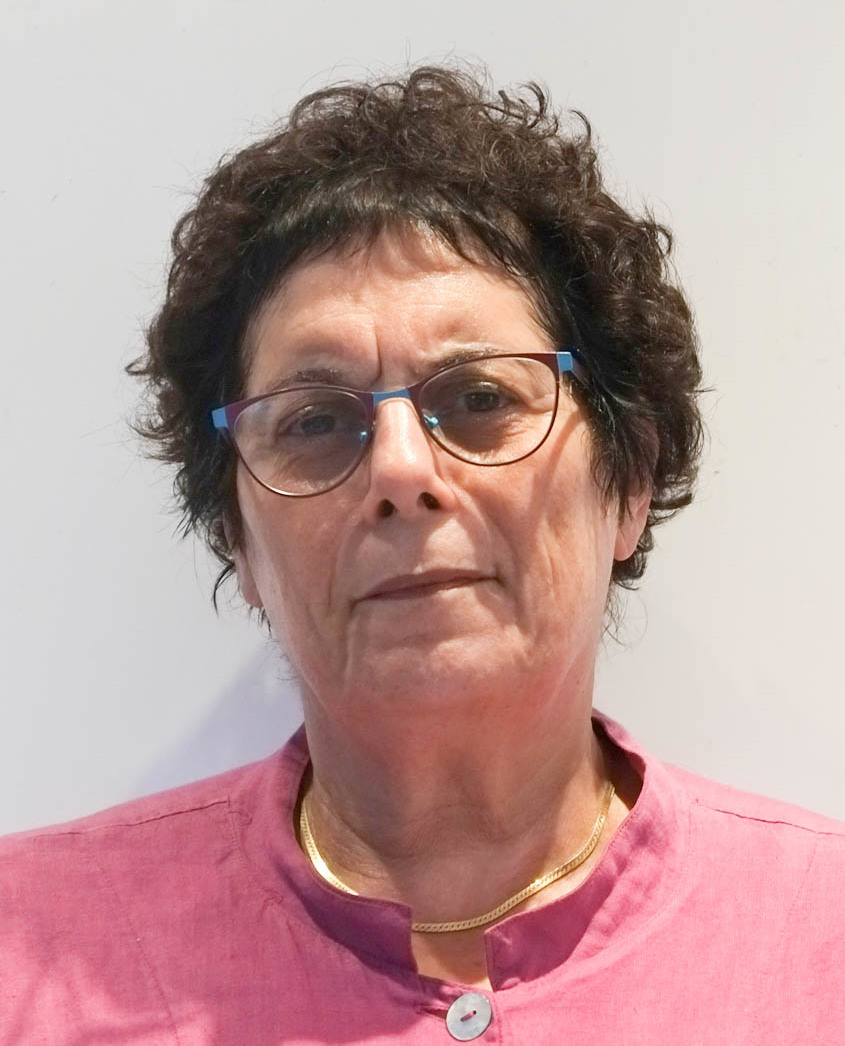
- Born: November 13, 1947; Tel Aviv, Mandatory Palestine
- Died: November 9, 2025 (aged 77)

Academic background
- Education: Tel Aviv University

Academic work
- Discipline: Theatre
- Institutions: Tel Aviv University

Nurit Yaari (Hebrew: נורית יערי; November 13, 1947 - November 9, 2025) was an Israeli theatre scholar, dramaturge, director, artistic consultant, and professor in the Department of Theatre Arts at the Faculty of Arts at Tel Aviv University. Her main areas of research were classical Greek drama, classical and contemporary French theater, and Israeli theater.

== Biography ==
Yaari was born in Tel Aviv. She completed her bachelor’s and master’s degrees at Tel Aviv University in the Department of Theatre Arts. During her studies, she worked as an assistant director to Edna Shavit, Oded Kotler, and Hanoch Levin. In 1983 she completed her Ph.D. at Paris 8 University, France, with thesis "Le Théâtre des Miroirs: Duplication et Dédoublement dans le Théâtre Occidental" supervised by prof. André Veinstein

Upon her return to Israel, she taught drama and theatre at Oranim Academic College in Tivon, at the Department of Humanities and Arts at the Technion, in the Department of Art History at the University of Haifa, and at Seminar HaKibbutzim in Tel Aviv. From 1988, she taught in the Department of Theatre Arts at Tel Aviv University, and in the 1990s, she also taught in the Department of French. In 2000–2001, she served as the head of the Multidisciplinary Program in Arts at Tel Aviv University; in 2000–2002, she managed the University Theatre, and between 2005 and 2009, she served as head of the Department of Theatre Arts.

In 2015, Yaari taught as a visiting professor in the Hebrew Department at INALCO (Institut national des langues et civilisations orientales), at Paris Diderot University (Paris VII).

In addition to teaching, she was playwright and member of the artistic committee of the Habima Theatre (1990–1995), an artistic consultant and playwright for the Jerusalem Khan Theatre since 1996, and a member of the Theatre Council of the Tel Aviv Literature and Art Foundation. She played an important role in the renovation of the Israeli theatre archives at Tel Aviv University.

== Books ==
- Nurit Yaari, Contemporary French Theatre 1960 – 1992, Paris: AFAA and Entr’Actes, 1995.
- Nurit Yaari, Le Théâtre de Hanokh Levin: Ensemble à l'ombre des canons Paris: éditions Théâtrales, 2008.
- Yaari, Nurit; Roziḳ, Eliyahu, eds. (2015). Inter-art journey: exploring the common grounds of the arts: studies in honor of Eli Rozik. Brighton Chicago: Sussex Academic Press. ISBN 978-1-83764-167-3.
- Yaʿari, Nurit (2018). Between Jerusalem and Athens: Israeli Theatre and the Classical Tradition. Classical Presences Series. Oxford: Oxford University Press USA. ISBN 978-0-19-106360-2.

== Death ==
On October 26, 2025, Nurit Yaari went missing, last seen near the Ichilov Hospital, where she accompanied her husband. She had bad sight, but on the security cameras she was seen without her glasses. After over a week she was found severely weakened under a bridge over the Ayalon River. She was hospitalized at the Ichilov Hospital, but died there on November 9, 2025.
