= Job's Passion =

Play written by Hanoch Levin

- Written by: Hanoch Levin
- Original language: Hebrew
- Genre: Drama
- Setting: Israel

Premiere
- Date premiered: April 1981
- Place premiered: Cameri Theater

Job's Passion (Hebrew: יסורי איוב, Ysurei 'Yov) is a play by Israeli playwright Hanoch Levin, based on the biblical story of Job, combined with elements of Christ's Passion.

The play was first staged in April 1981 at The Cameri Theater in Israel, under the direction of Levin himself and starring Yosef Carmon as Job. The first production was criticized since it included a scene of the naked Job crucified through his anus by Roman centurions and left thus for the remainder of the play. Miriam Glazer-Ta'asa, Israel's Deputy Minister of Education and Culture at the time, claimed before the Knesset that the state should not fund theater where, "a naked man is hanging for twenty minutes with his genitals flailing about." Regardless of this criticism, Carmon was awarded the "David's Violin" Prize for his portrayal of Job.

== Structure ==
The play is made up of seven Acts and an epilogue. within each section events are often repeated in cycles of three, thus Job is visited by three groups of beggars, three messengers of poverty, three messengers of death, and finally three friends.

Act I – The Beggars
Act II – The Messengers of Poverty
Act III – The Executors
Act IV – The Messengers of Death
Act V – The Friends
Act VI – The Soldiers
Act VII – The Entertainers
Act VIII – The Dead

== Productions ==
The play has been translated into English, French, German and Swedish.

- 1981 - Cameri Theater (Tel Aviv, Israel) - directed by Hanoch Levin
- 2006 - Theater for the New City (New York City, New York) - translated by Shay K. Azoulay; directed by David Paul Willinger
- 2011 - The Jewish Theater (Stockholm, Sweden) - directed by Philip Zandén
- 2024 - Compagnie DERAÏDENZ (Avignon, France) - directed by Léa Guillec
