= Yoram Gal =

Israeli playwright and actor (born 1952)

- יורם גל
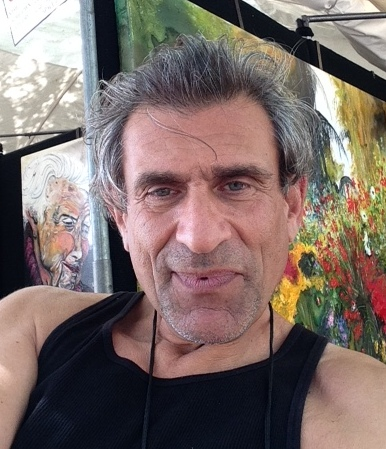
- Yoram Gal in 2015
- Born: Yoram Gal; 7 January 1952 (age 74); Israel
- Citizenship: Israeli
- Occupations: Actor, Theater Director, Painter
- Spouse(s): Edna Shavit (1978–1994); Nili Dotan (1996–2013); Tzlila Hurvitz (2016–2020); Christine-Adele Moore (partner 2020-)

Yoram Gal (Hebrew: יורם גל; born 7 January 1952) is an international Israeli painter, playwright, director, actor and theater, TV and cinema producer.

== Biography ==
=== Early life ===
Yoram Gal was born in Jerusalem, son of Ephraim Roytenberg (known as Fima), a Jewish painter born in Harbin, China and who emigrated to Israel in 1949, and Naomi Margalit, born in Jerusalem, a teacher and economist. His parents divorced when Gal was one year old. When he was six, his mother married Yossef Gal, an economist, and the three moved to the center of Jerusalem. Three years later, his sister Aya, later a psychologist, was born, and when he was 11 the family moved to London, UK, where his stepfather represented the state of Israel as the economic attache's in the embassy. Gal began painting at age 12 when he underwent psychotherapy at the Anna Freud Clinic in London.

=== Early career (1970s) ===
Gal emerged in the Israeli theater scene in the late 1970s. His first stage play, Everyman (כלאדם), premiered in 1978 at Tel Aviv University’s theater under the direction of Edna Shavit. That same year, he designed sets and costumes for Hanoch Levin’s Rubber Merchants (סוחרי הגומי) at the Cameri Theatre (Tzavta, June 1978). Around this time, he began appearing in Israeli television dramas, including Kamikaza (Israeli Educational Television, 1977) and Under a Black Cloud’s Shadow (בצל ענן שחור, Channel 1, 1980).

=== Theater (1980s–1990s) ===
Throughout the 1980s, Gal became a leading figure in Israel’s alternative and fringe theater movement. His absurdist comedy Billy-Bull the Great (בילי בול הגדול) was staged at the 1983 Acco Festival of Alternative Theater, followed by The Rooster (התרנגול, 1989) and Jacobo, Ish Goldonia (יעקובו, איש גולדוניה, 1989). His productions, noted for their visual inventiveness, often featured him as playwright, director, and actor.

During this period, he also appeared in Israeli and international screen productions, including Remembrance of Love (NBC, 1982, starring Kirk Douglas), A Dinner of Herbs (BBC, 1988), and Friends of Yael (Channel 1, 1990).

In the early 1990s, Gal’s traveling theater company staged children’s plays such as Where Did the Laughter Go? (1988) and Anatoly’s Hope (1990). He performed his one-man adaptation of Dostoevsky’s A Gentle Spirit at the 1993 Teatronetto Monodrama Festival and played Harpagon in Molière’s The Miser (1994–2003), directed by Edna Shavit. In 2001, Gal and Nili Dotan received the Prime Minister’s Prize for Hebrew Drama (Ben-Gurion Memorial Award) for their play The Old Man and I.

In 2024 Gal published his novel I IMAGINE.

=== Film career ===
Gal wrote, directed, and starred in the feature film Wild (Pra, 1999), produced by Nili Dotan. The film, an allegorical satire on Israeli life, received widespread critical praise in Israeli media. Irit Shammer of Ma’ariv (12 October 1999) described it as “like a fresh breath of rain, somewhat wet,” while Uri Klein of Haaretz (19 October 1999) called it “the Israeli Candide.”

=== Visual art (2000s–Present) ===
In painting, Gal found catharsis for his soul's storms, and at age 15 he passed the A' Level exams in Art, which enabled him to enter art college. According to Gal, his teacher advised against it, and told him simply to paint and observe and study works of masters like Van Gogh and Botticelli by himself. He graduated from JFS, the Jewish high school, at age 17, and returned to Israel, where he joined the IDF, ending his three-year service as a lieutenant. In Jerusalem, he exhibited his first one-man show in Beit Mori. The leading Israeli newspaper Yediot Ahronot published a favorable critique of the show, written by the renowned critic Miriam Tal.

From 1973–1977 Gal studied Theater and Cinema at Tel Aviv University (Hons. BFA).

From 2002 onward, Gal built a global reputation as a painter. He exhibited in major U.S. juried art festivals, including the Sausalito Art Festival (California, 2003–2011), Art on the Square (Illinois), and the Cottonwood Art Festival (Texas), winning numerous awards.

Internationally, Gal represented Israel at the 2005 Florence Biennale and participated in the Beijing International Art Expo (2011). The Fu Zhou Museum in Nanjing, China, acquired a dozen of his works in 2011, and the I.P. Stanback Museum (South Carolina State University) added his painting Jesus the Juicy Jew in Jerusalem to its permanent collection in 2012.

In 2015, Gal opened the Yoram Gal Studio in Old Jaffa, where he continues to paint and exhibit. His colorful, expressive works draw from Israeli and Mediterranean landscapes and have been showcased at dozens of art fairs worldwide.

== Personal life ==
In 1978 Gal married his ex theater professor Edna Shavit, and was her two year old son's stepfather. They divorced in 1994. In 1996 he married Nili Dotan, playwright and screenwriter, and in 2000 their son Nimrod was born. They divorced in 2013. In 2016 he married Tzlila Hurvitz, their marriage lasted 4 years.

== Filmography ==
=== Theater ===
- Everyman, director Edna Shavit, 1978.
- Hanoch and Sophocles', director Yoram Gal, 1980.
- Billy-Bull The Great, director Edna Shavit, 1983.
- Outs, director Yoram Gal, 1984
- Isaac the Crybaby and his revenge on the Homeland, director Aviel Hadari,1985
- The Careerist, director Dorit Yerushalmi, 1987
- Bergman, Michael Almaz's Theater in London, director Yigal Azrati, 1988, in English.
- The Rooster, director Edna Shavit, 1989.
- Jacobo Hero of Goldonia, director Edna Shavit, 1989.

Gal has written many plays which have not yet been produced, among them Psyche (1983), Spiritolini (1989), Professor Bergman (1982), Gabriella (1993), Hanita sets out on Life (1994), El Rais Is Coming (1994), The Egotist (1994), The Individualist and The Devil (1993), The Buick and The Caravan (1992) and Shira from T (1990).

==== Theater acting ====
- The Family (1976)
- Everyman (1978)
- Billy-Bull The Great (1983)
- Outs (1984)
- Yehezkel Fireman's Tales (1986)
- Eliezer Ben-Yehuda (1982)
- Herzl - King of the Jews (1987)
- The Miser (1994–2003)
- The Rooster (1990)
- A gentle Spirit (1993)

==== Plays for children and youth ====
- Yaki Anaki, director Agnes Poldash, 1980.
- The Old Man Walks, director Edna Shavit, 1986.
- King of The Jews, director Edna Shavit, 1988.
- Where did the Laughter go, co-directed by Gal/Sover, 1988.
- Anatoly’s Hope, co directed by Gal/Sover, 1990.
- Drugs Lie, director Arieh Sover, 1990.
- David’s Violin, co-directed by Gal/Sover, 1992.
- Maranos, Shema Israel, director Yaki Mecherez, 1992.
- Rutty Heroine of Jerusalem, director Yoram Gal, 1993.
- Deddy and Lisa Salamat, director Yoram Gal, 1994.
- Let There Be Light, director Yoram Gal, 1995.
- Safely, director Yoram Gal, 1995.
- Don Quixote, director Ednan Tarabshe, 1994.
- The Old Man and I', 2001.
- Yotam The Wild One, director Yoram Gal, 2003.

==== Visual design (stage) ====
- Rubber Merchants by Hanoch Levin (1978)

=== Cinema and TV ===
Wrote and directed the feature film "WILD",

==== Directing ====
- Hanoch and Sophocles (1980)
- Outs (1984)
- The House is going to be empty again (1996)
- The Old Man and I (2001)
- The Game (2001)

==== TV and film acting ====
- Under a black cloud's shadow (1980)
- Remembrance of Love (1982)
- A Dinner of Herbs (1988)
- Friends of Yael (1990)
- Kamikaza (1977)
- Black day in Sde Avraham (1984)
- Shmita Year (1986)
- The mirrors Scale (1991)
- The Revolutionary - Life of Jesus (1995–96)
- The Tale of the man who was silent (1998)
- Yes or No' (2000)
