= Bat-Sheva Zeisler =

Israeli actress

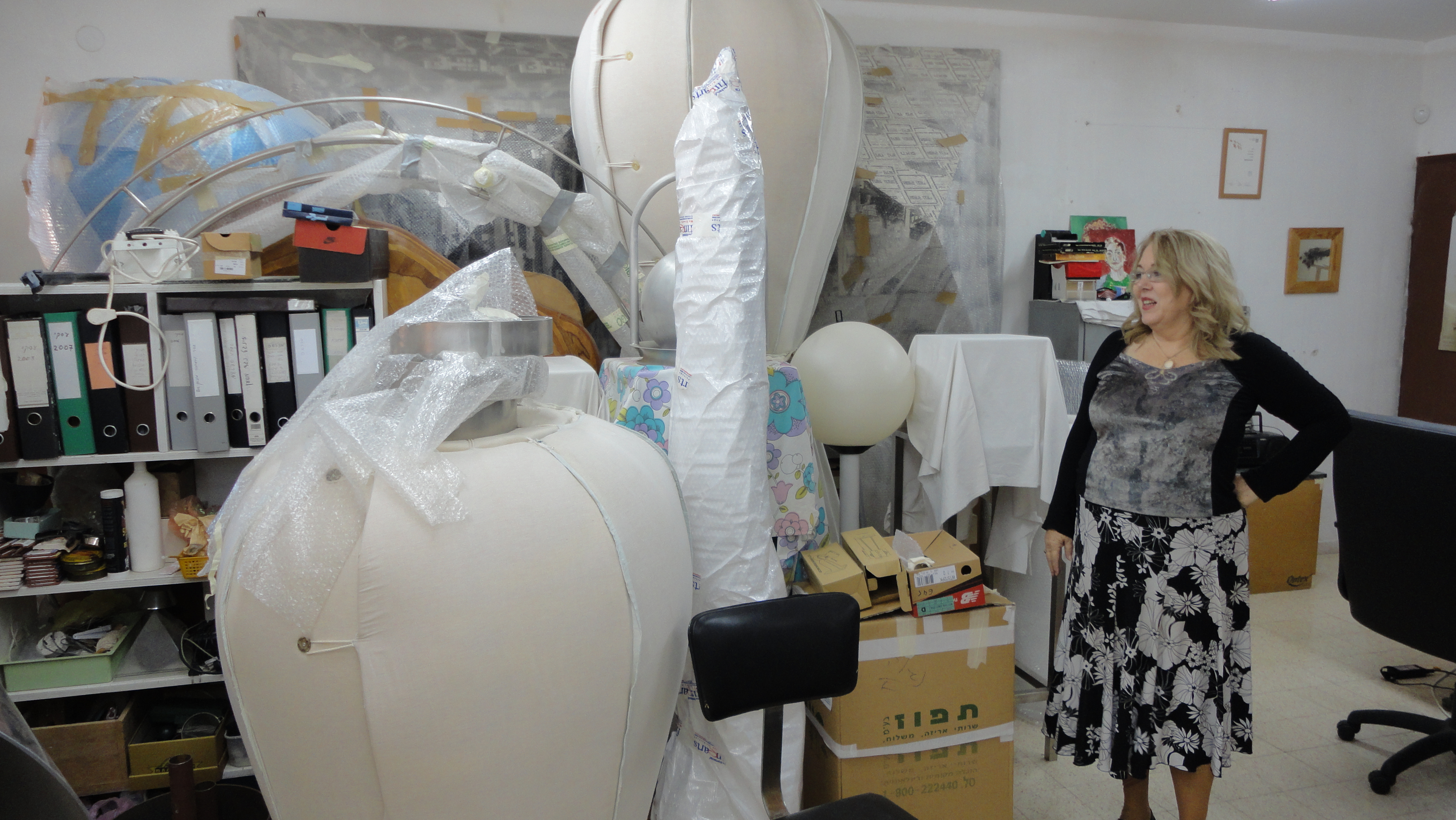
Bat-Sheva Zeisler

Bat-Sheva Zeisler (Hebrew: בת-שבע צייזלר) is an Israeli vocalist, actress, and voice teacher. She sings in the soprano range.

== Biography ==
Bat-Sheva Zeisler's father was the city architect of Rishon Lezion, where she still lives. Zeisler graduated from Tel Aviv University, where she studied drama and literature. She then studied voice at London's Guildhall School of Music and Drama and the London College of Music.

She is the widow of Israeli artist Gideon Gechtman (1942–2008), whom she met in London. Their son, Noam, works in the advertising industry. Another son, Yotam, a film director, died in 1998.

== Theater and acting career ==
Bat-Sheva Zeisler was a member of the original cast of the 1968-1969 production of You and Me and the Next War, a satirical cabaret by Hanoch Levin with lyrics set to music by Alex Kagan and Beni Nagari. The show consisted of a series of sketches that reflected the anti-war vibe in the USA during the Vietnam War. An updated version congruent with Israel reality was performed by the original cast from 2004 to 2008. The director of the play was the late Edna Shavit, who died in 2015.

Zeislier also participated in a number of other productions, including Everything You Wanted to Know Often, and Didn't Dare to Ask Bach, short one-act plays by Offenbach, directed by Eran Baniel, with Dani Masseng co-acting, stage choreography by the late Ya'akov Sommer and musical director Yitzhak Steiner; The Beggar's Opera at the Beersheba Theater, with a new musical score by Alex Kagan and directed by Dan Ronnen; An Upside-Down Monument by Yossef Mundi, and directed by him at the Yuval Theater; Intimacy directed by Tammar Lederer-Barkan, at Hasimta Theater; My Fair Lady, The Imaginary Patient and The Star of Tears. The two latter productions were directed by Motti Averbuch, who also wrote the script for The Star of Tears.The play was later transformed into an opera with music by Thierry Wieder, a professional in localization and voice production.

Zeisler managed the Elharizi Theater in Tel Aviv until its closure in the early 1990s. During her management, short plays and musical performances were showcased on Thursday and Friday evenings and a children's theater on Saturdays.

== Singing career ==
Zeisler had an extensive career as a soprano vocalist. Her program featured Songs in Red and Yellow, Bat-Sheva and Simcha go to Broadway with Habimah singer-actor Simcha Barbiro and songs by Eric Satie and Francis Poulenc. In several of these programs, she was accompanied by the Dutch-Israeli classical pianist Bart Berman.

For a few years, Zeisler worked as a voice coach. She has not sung professionally since the death of her husband, Gidon Gechman.

== Discography ==
- Alan Jay Lerner and Frederick Loewe: My Fair Lady (Helicon, 1986)
- Hanoch Levin: You, Me and the Next War (Ofir, 2004)
