= Remembrance of Love =

- Directed by: Jack Smight
- Written by: Harold Jack Bloom
- Based on: Story by Rena Dictor Le Blanc
- Produced by: Lynn Guthrie; Doris Quinlan
- Starring: Kirk Douglas
- Cinematography: Adam Greenberg
- Edited by: Richard Bracken
- Music by: William Goldstein
- Production companies: Comworld Productions; Doris Quinlan Productions
- Distributed by: All Video; Egmont Audio Visual; Multicom Entertainment Group; National Broadcasting Company; Schröder Media; Syme Home Video; Top Tape
- Release date: December 6, 1982
- Running time: 120 min
- Country: United States

Remembrance of Love is a 1982 war film directed by Jack Smight and starring Kirk Douglas. A reunion of Holocaust survivors in Israel brings together a couple who had been teenage lovers 35 years earlier in Poland during the Second World War. It aired as an NBC Monday Movie. Star Douglas's real-life son Eric Douglas, 23, played his father in flashbacks. Actor and singer Robert Clary, a Holocaust survivor, appeared as himself.

== Cast ==
- Kirk Douglas as Joe Rabin
- Robert Clary as himself
- Pam Dawber as Marcy Rabin
- Eric Douglas as Young Joe Rabin
- Chana Eden as Leah
- Yehuda Efroni
- Irit Frank as Young Leah
- Yoram Gal as David
- Gladys Gewirtz as Rose
- Michael Goodwin as Ken
