= Gideon Gechtman =

Israeli artist and sculptor (1942–2008)

Gideon Gechtman גדעון גכטמן
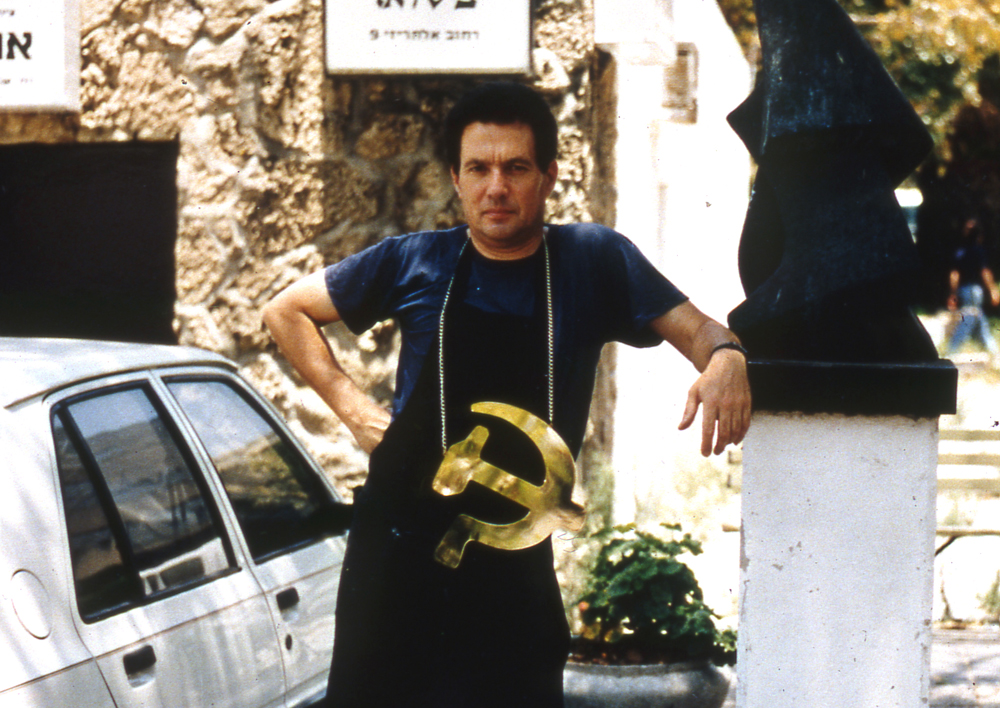
- Born: 17 December 1942; Alexandria, Egypt
- Died: 27 November 2008 (aged 65); Israel
- Known for: sculpture
- Movement: Israeli art

Gideon Gechtman (Hebrew: גדעון גכטמן; 17 December 1942 – 27 November 2008) was an Israeli artist and sculptor. His art is most noted for holding a dialogue with death, frequently as it relates to his own biography.

== Biography ==
Gideon Gechtman was born on 17 December, 1942 in Alexandria, Egypt. He moved to British mandatory of Palestine with his family in 1945. He studied at the Avni Institute of Art and Design (1961–1962) in Tel Aviv, Hammersmith College of Art (1968–1971) in London, UK, the Ealing School of Art in London, UK, and Tel Aviv University (1975–1976).

After returning from London with his future wife singer/actress Bat-Sheva Zeisler, he created minimalistic art that was typical for that period. These works were described to "didactically demonstrate structural and figurative change in material and appearance." Gechtman taught at Bezalel Academy of Art and Design in Jerusalem (1972–1975) and the Art Teachers Training College of Beit Berl Academic College (1971–2008).

In 1973, Gechtman had his first solo exhibition in the Yodfat Gallery in Tel Aviv. The exhibition, named "Exposure," signified Gechtman's increasing interest in the connection between art and the biographic dimension. On the walls of the gallery were enlarged photographs of the body shaving process before the open heart surgery that Gechtman underwent in 1973. Also in this exhibition were real and fabricated documents regarding Gechtman's medical condition. At the closure of the exhibition, Gechtman put up obituaries for himself in Israeli dailies Haaretz and the Jerusalem Post, as well as around his home in Rishon LeZion. Gechtman later commented on the reactions: "Teachers from Bezalel said to me: 'Have you gone mad? You frightened everyone.'" The obituaries were a returning element in Gechtman's art for years to come.

In 1999, he exhibited a remodelled hospital environment under the name Yotam, in the name of his son, who had died in 1998.

Gideon Gechtman died of heart failure on 27 November, 2008. He was 65.

== Gallery ==
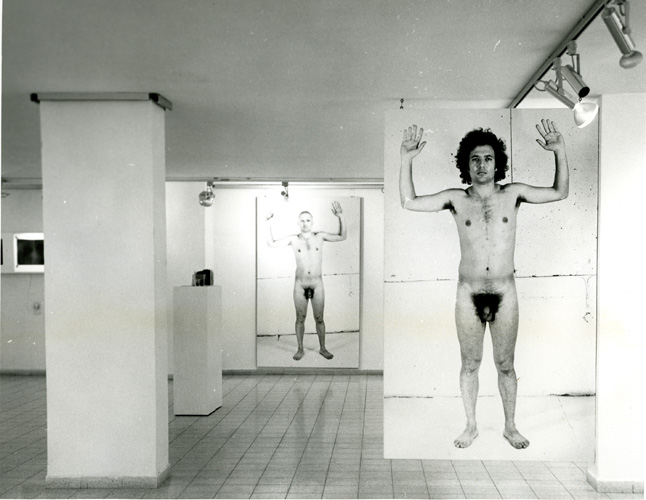
Exposure, 1973
Installation view, Ydfat Fallery, Tel Aviv

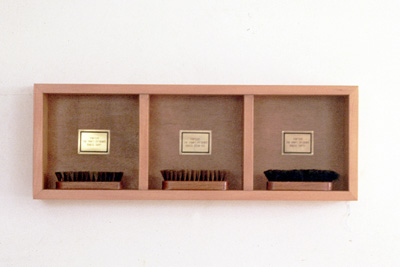
Brushes (Bat-Sheva, Gideon and Yotam Gechtman), 1974
human hair, wood, copper plaques, glass

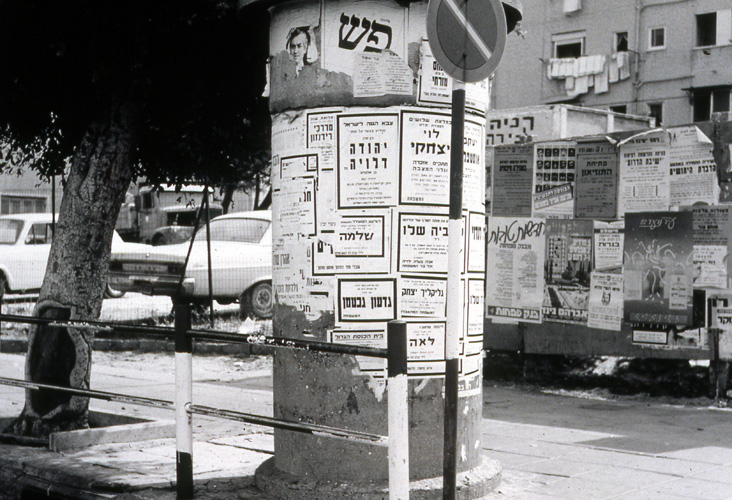
Obituary Notices, 1975
Bulletin board in Rishon LeZion

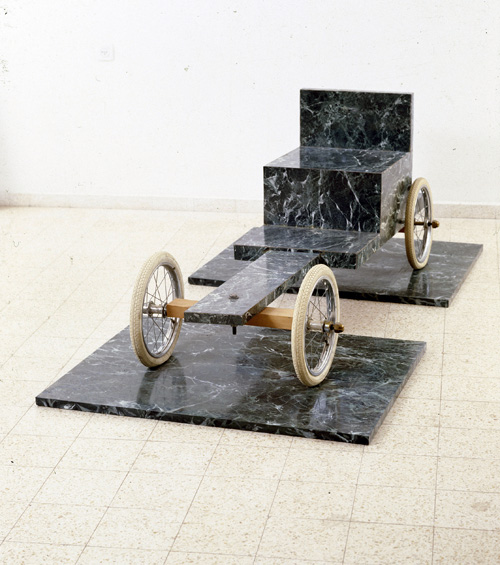
Cart, 1982-1984
wood, formica, iron, rubber, brass. base painting in superlac on plywood

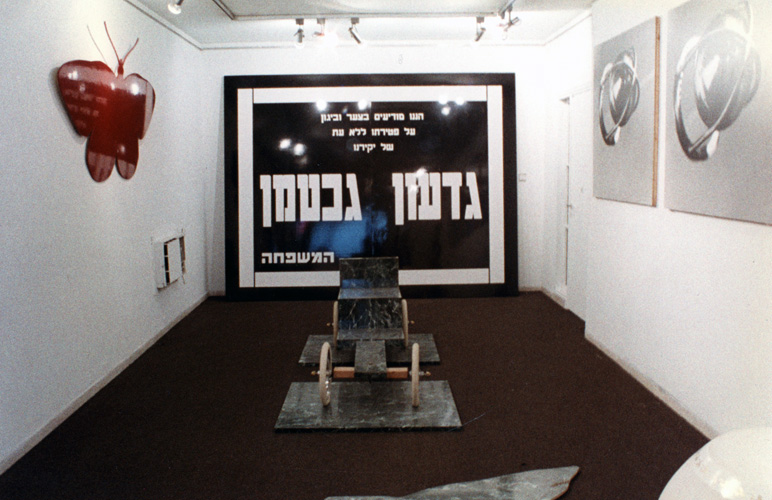
Obituaries, 1984
Installation view, Neomi Givon Gallery, Tel Aviv

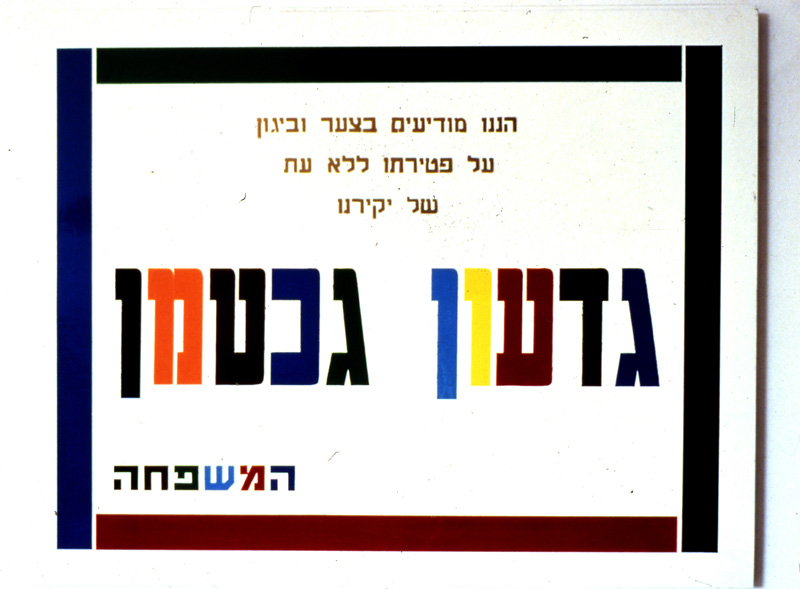
Obituary Notice, 1984
superlac on plywood, 79.5x103.5 cm.

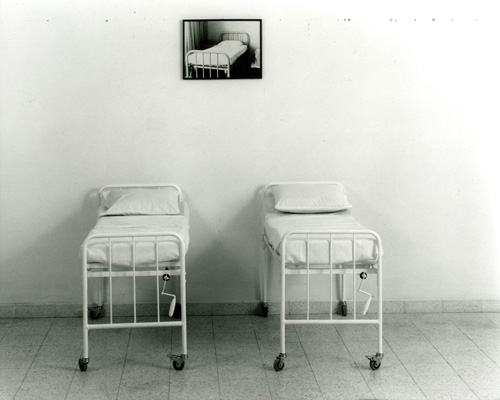
Mitot, 1985
Installation view, Kibbutz Gallery, Tel Aviv

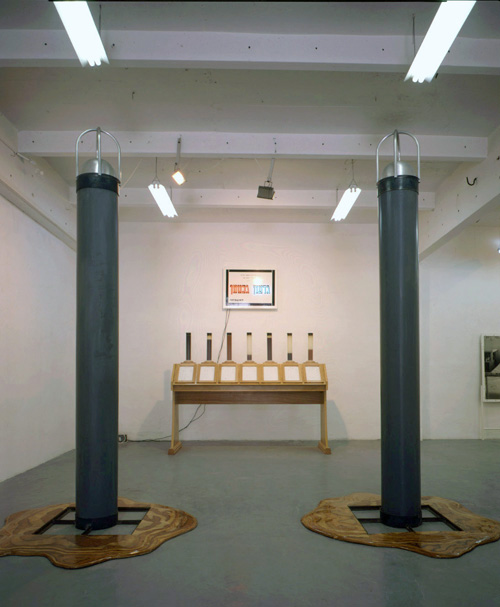
Preparation for Mausoleum No.1, 1988
Installation view, Artists Studios Workshops, Jerusalem

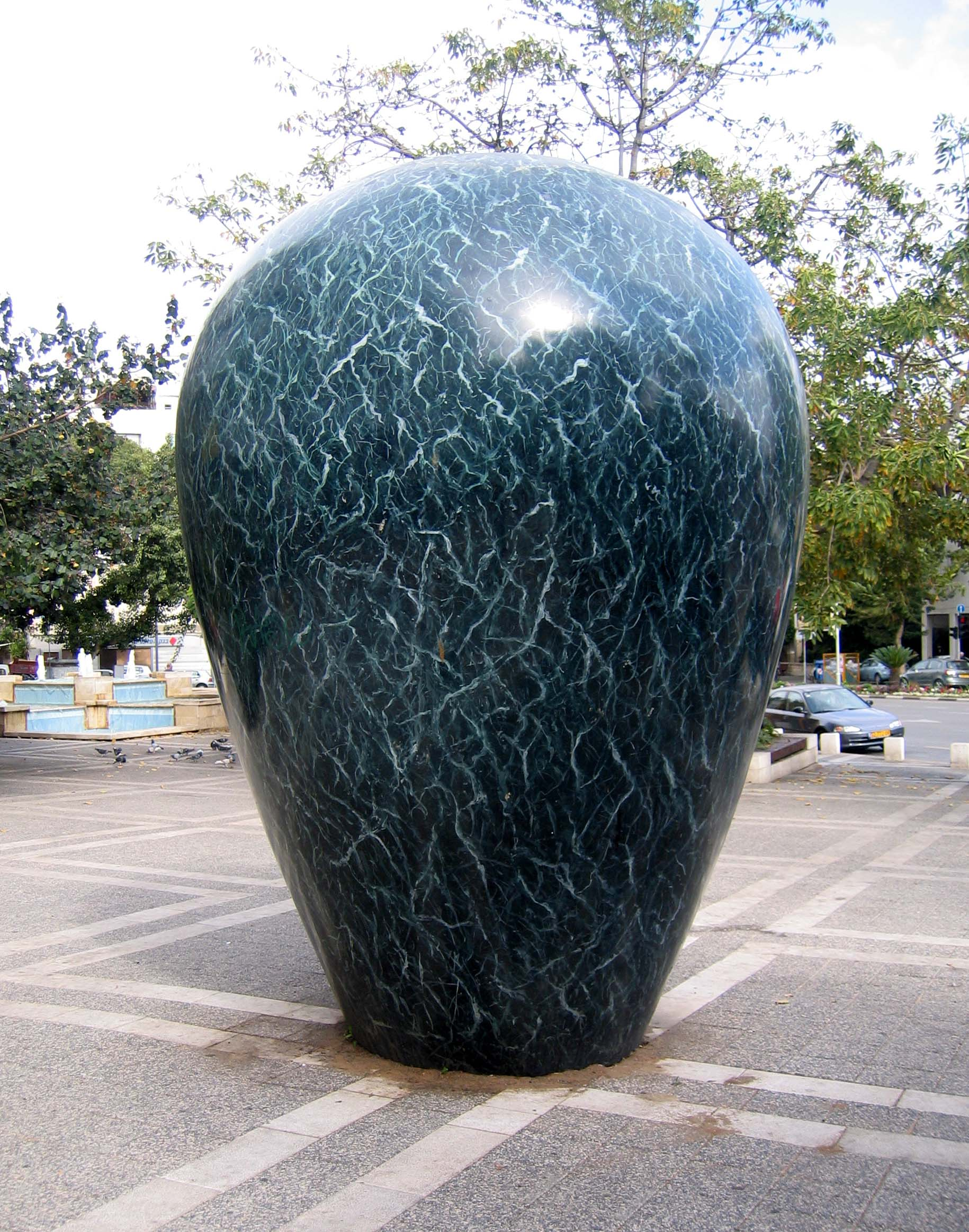
Vase, 1992
Fiberglass and Paint
Ibn Gabirol Street, Tel Aviv

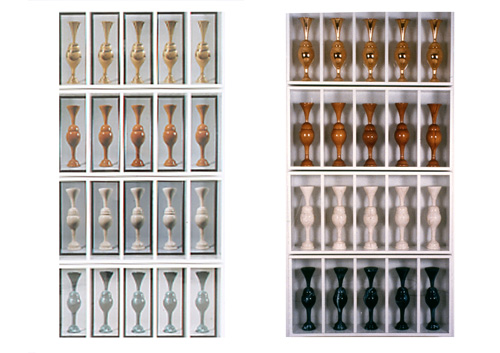
Echo, 1995
Mix Media

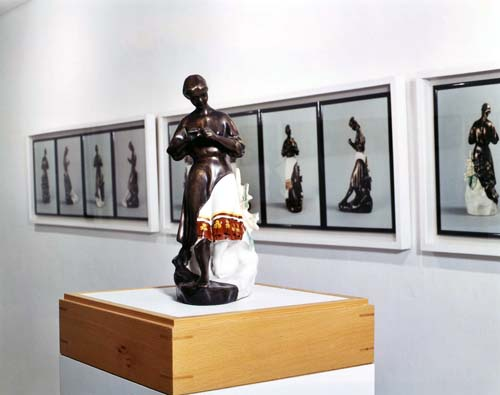
Chedva, 1995
Installation view, Chelouche Gallery, Tel Aviv

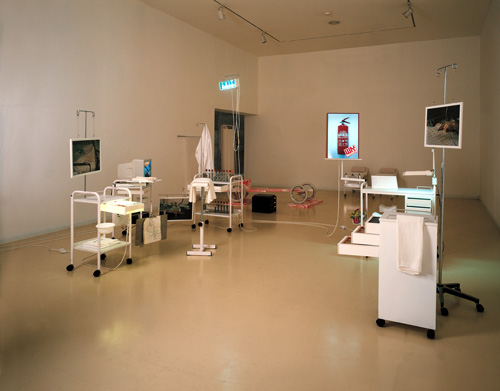
Yotam, 1999
Installation view, Herzliya Museum of Contemporary Art

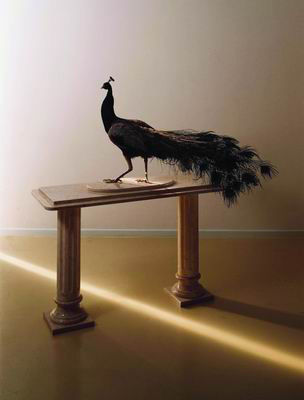
Peacock, 1999
Israel Museum Collection

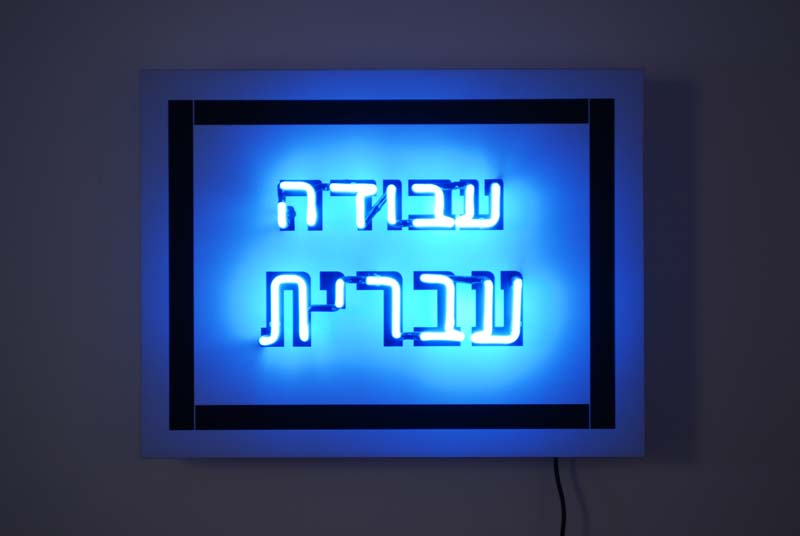
Neon obituary notice, 2006

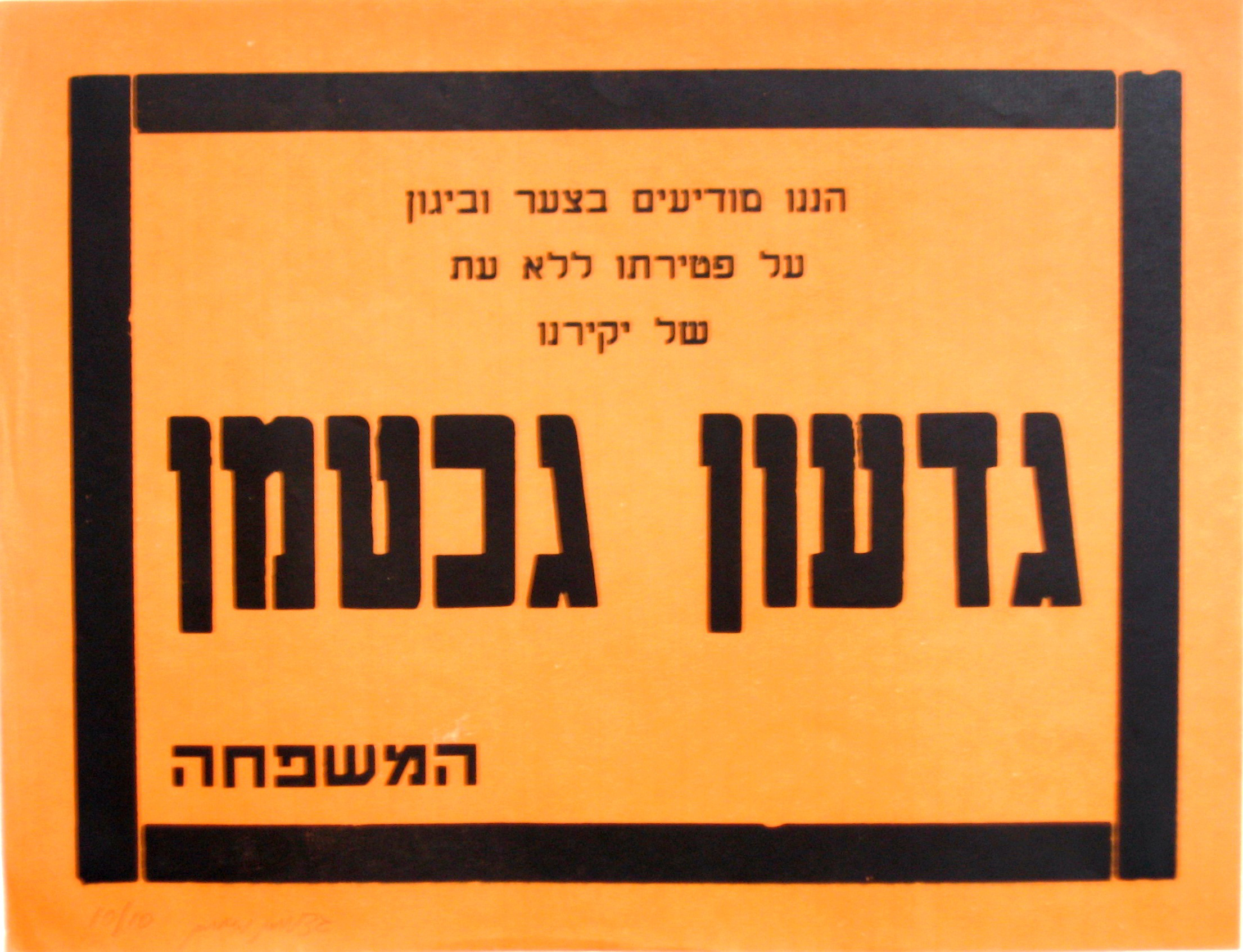
Orange obituary notice

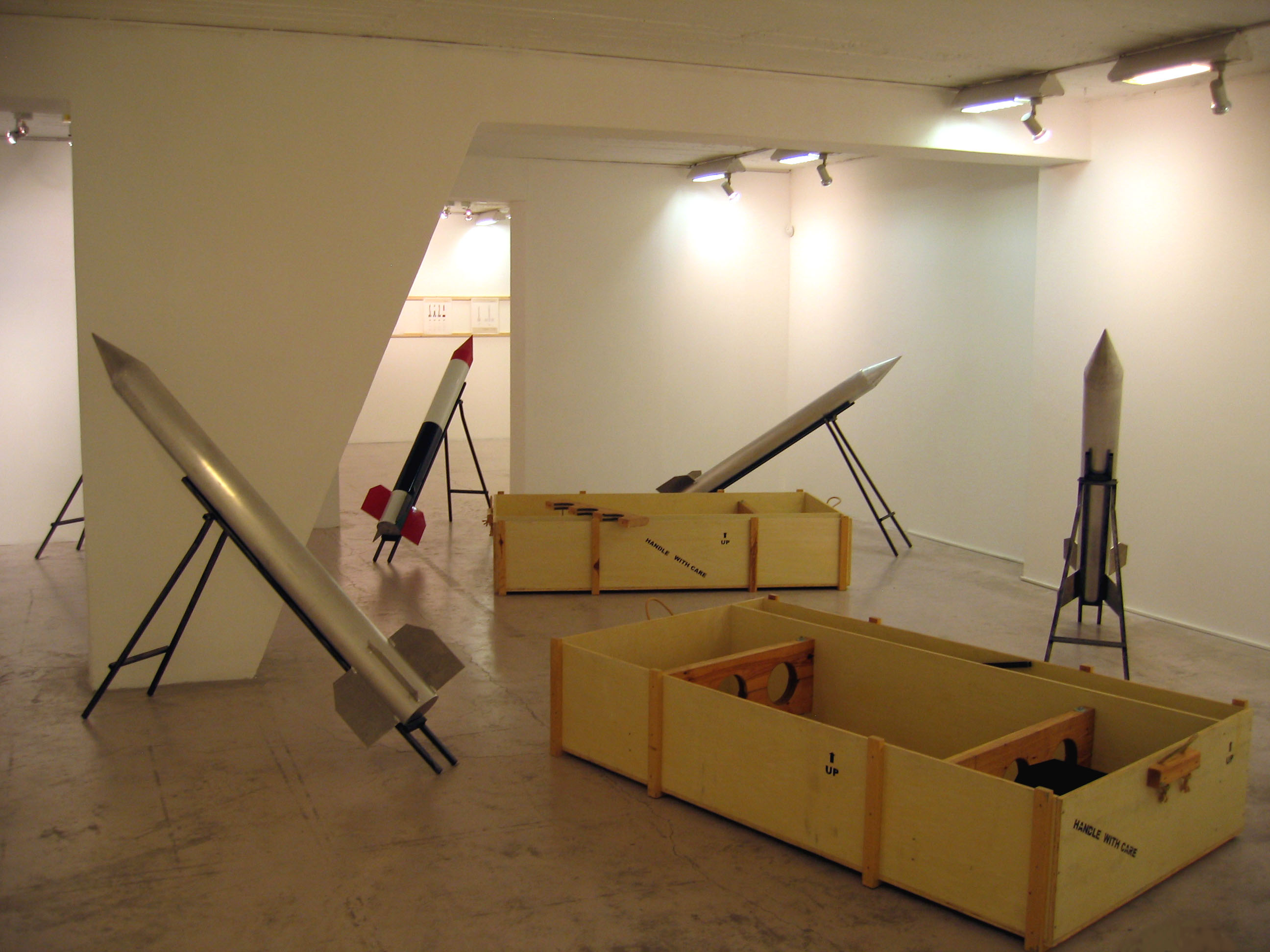
Launching Apparatus, 2008
Installation view, Chelouche Gallery, Tel Aviv

== Education ==
- 1961-62 Avni Institute, Tel Aviv
- 1962-63 Ealing School of Art, London
- 1968-70 Hammersmith College of Art, London
- 1975-76 Tel Aviv University, philosophy and art history

== Prizes ==
- 1970 – Royal Academy, London
- 1989 – Ministry of Education Prize for Completion of Project
- 1990 – Histadrut Prize
- 1993 – Minister of Science and Arts Prize for Creations in the Realm of Plastic Arts
- 1995 – Tel Aviv Museum of Art Prize
- 1997 – Israel Discount Bank Prize for an Israeli Artist, Israel Museum, Jerusalem
- 1999 – George and Janet Geffin Prize for Excellence in Plastic Arts, America Israel Cultural Foundation
- 2002 – Haifa Museum Award for Art for distinguished achievement in contemporary creative arts
- 2006 – Ministry of culture prize for his life's work.

== Solo exhibitions ==
- 1973 – Exposure, Yodfat Gallery, Tel Aviv
- 1984 – Givon Art Gallery, Tel Aviv
- 1985 – Mitot, Kibbutz Gallery, Tel Aviv
- 1988 – Preparation for Mausoleum No.1, Artists Studios, Jerusalem
- 1992 – Israel Echo, Bograshov Gallery, Tel Aviv
- 1996 – Chedva, Chelouche Gallery, Tel Aviv
- 1999 – Yotam, Herzliya Museum of Art
- 2001 – Etude, Chelouche Gallery, Tel Aviv
- 2001 – Infinite Regress, Wiensowski & Harbord, Berlin
- 2003 – Chedva, Gideon and all the Rest, Artists House, Tel Aviv
- 2003 – Haifa Museum of Art, Haifa
- 2007 – Initial Concept, Petah Tikva Museum of Art
- 2007 – Dead Line, Beit Kanner Municipal Gallery, Rishon Lezion
- 2008 – Launching Apparatus, Chelouche Gallery, Tel Aviv
- 2012 – Butterflies & Pyramids, Chelouche Gallery, Tel Aviv
- 2013 – Gideon Gechtman, 1942–2008, Israel Museum, Jerusalem
