= Simcha Barbiro =

Israeli actor (born 1967)

- שמחה ברבירו
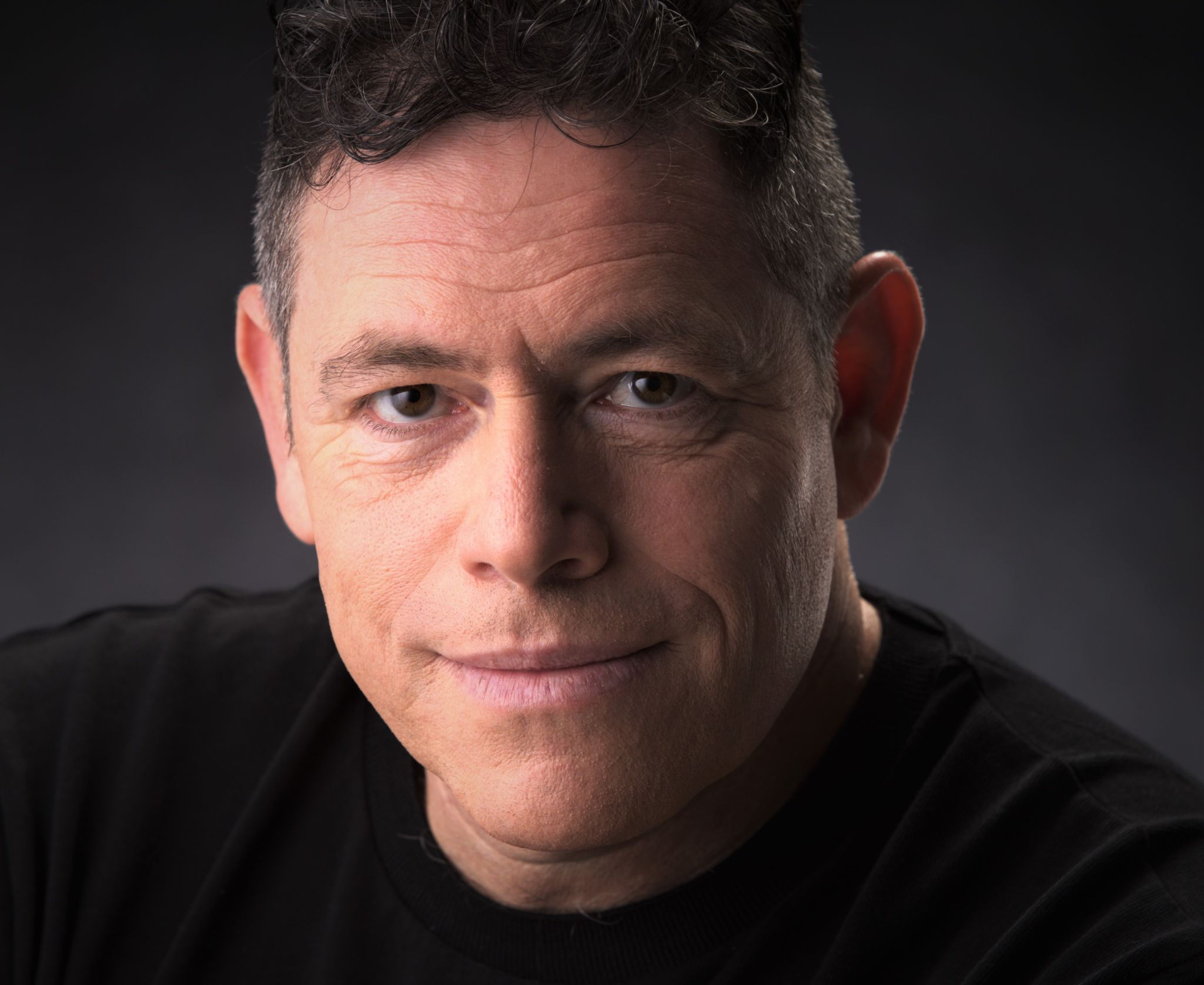
- Born: 27 April 1967 (age 59); Israel
- Occupations: Actor; voice actor
- Years active: 1980–present

Simcha Barbiro (Hebrew: שמחה ברבירו; born 27 April 1967) is an Israeli actor and voice actor.

== Biography ==
Barbiro graduated from Beit Zvi Actors School of Performing Arts in 1991.

He is known for his voice-over work in animated TV shows and feature films. Some of his prominent work includes the Hebrew dubs for Stitch and Dr. Hamsterviel in Lilo & Stitch: The Series and its anime television adaptation, Mort from the Madagascar series, Harvey Bullock from Batman: The Animated Series, Krillin and Frieza from Dragon Ball ("Z" and "GT").

Following the death of Yoni Chen in 1995, Barbiro replaced him in Looney Tunes feature film, Bugs Bunny's 3rd Movie: 1001 Rabbit Tales as Elmer Fudd (until the first DVD edition dub) and Sylvester (until The Sylvester & Tweety Mysteries). Both roles were passed on to Ami Mandelman.

Following Giora Kenneth's retirement from voice work in 2007, due to health problems in his throat, Barbiro replaced him as Mr. Herriman in Foster's Home for Imaginary Friends and Minimus P.U. in Atomic Betty.

He is a close friend of Yoram Yosefsberg who co-played Allot in dubbing works.

As an actor, Barbiro has participated in TV shows, radio commercials and plays.

== Acting ==
=== Stage productions ===
- Bat-Sheva veSimcha Holchim leBroadway (Bat-Sheva and Simcha Go to Broadway) with Bat-Sheva Zeisler and Bart Berman
- Ivanov with the Cameri Theater (Dmitry Kosykh)

=== TV shows ===
- Ha'ee (A guy in the kiosk at the Marine)
- LaLa Land (Gershon)
- Mendelbaum Balash Prati (Jewelry Store Owner)
- Polishuk (Israel Bajonder)
- Shemesh (Menahem)

== Filmography ==
=== Dubbing ===
==== Animation and live action TV ====
- Dragon Booster (Artha Penn)
- Hot Wheels Battle Force 5 (Master Takeyasu)
- Adventure Time (The Ice King, additional characters)
- Adventures of Sonic the Hedgehog (additional characters)
- American Dragon: Jake Long (Luong Lao Shi "Grandpa", additional characters)
- Animalia (G'Bubu)
- Animaniacs (Dr. Otto Scratchansniff, Runt, additional voices)
- Arthur (additional characters)
  - Postcards from Buster (additional characters)
- Atomic Betty (Minimus P.U. (Season 3))
- Batman series
  - Batman: The Animated Series (Harvey Bullock)
  - Batman: The Brave and the Bold (Green Arrow (Season 1), Clock King, additional super heroes and villains, additional characters)
- Ben 10 series
  - Ben 10 (additional characters)
  - Ben 10: Alien Force (Humungousaur, Brainstorm (second voice), Professor Paradox)
  - Ben 10: Ultimate Alien (Humungousaur, Brainstorm, Paradox)
- Bigfoot Presents: Meteor and the Mighty Monster Trucks (Junkboy, Race Announcer)
- Bunnytown (additional bunnies)
- Cars Toons: Mater's Tall Tales (Luigi, additional characters)
- Cars on the Road (Luigi)
- Cedric (additional characters)
- CJ the DJ (additional characters)
- Cosmic Quantum Ray (additional characters)
- Dinosaur King (additional characters)
- Dragon Ball Z (Krillin, Frieza, Mr. Popo (second voice), Grand Kai (second voice))
  - Dragon Ball Z: Bardock – The Father of Goku (Frieza)
  - Dragon Ball Z: The History of Trunks (Krillin)
  - Dragon Ball GT (Krillin, Frieza, Mr Popo, Ledgic, Shu (Episode 1), Seven-Star Dragon)
  - Dragon Ball GT: A Hero's Legacy (Demon King)
  - Dragon Ball Super (Krillin, Frieza, Frost)
- Dora the Explorer (additional characters) (season 1)
- Duel Masters (additional characters)
- Famous 5: On the Case (additional characters)
- Fifi and the Flowertots (Slugsy)
- Flipper & Lopaka (Serge, Otti)
- Felix the Cat (Master Cylinder, additional characters)
- Finley the Fire Engine (Mr. Bell)
- Foster's Home for Imaginary Friends (Mr. Herriman (Episode 42 onwards), additional characters)
- Free Willy (Willy)
- George of the Jungle (Tookie Tookie Bird, Narrator, additional characters)
- Geronimo Stilton (additional characters)
- Gormiti (Lavion, additional characters)
- Growing Up Creepie (additional characters)
- Harry and His Bucket Full of Dinosaurs (additional characters)
- Hi Hi Puffy AmiYumi (additional characters)
- Huntik: Secrets & Seekers (Grier)
- Jackie Chan Adventures (Hak Foo, Hsi Wu, The Monkey King)
- Jacob Two-Two (Principal Greedyguts)
- Jim Henson's Animal Show (Stinky (second voice))
- Jimmy Two-Shoes (additional characters)
- Kid Paddle (Mr. Paddle)
- Kung Fu Panda: Legends of Awesomeness (Taotie, additional characters)
- League of Super Evil (additional characters)
- Legend of the Dragon (additional characters)
- Leonard (additional characters)
- Lilo & Stitch: The Series (Stitch, Dr. Hamsterviel, Moses Puloki, Luong Lao Shi "Grandpa", additional characters)
  - Stitch! (Stitch, Dr. Hamsterviel, additional characters)
- Little Princess (Father King)
- Looney Tunes (Elmer Fudd (first DVD edition dub only), Additional Characters (1990s TV version))
  - The Sylvester & Tweety Mysteries (Sylvester)
- Magi-Nation (Freep, Grandpa)
- Make Way for Noddy (Mr. Wobblyman, Mr. Sparks)
- Maya & Miguel (Santiago Santos)
- Mickey Mouse Clubhouse (Ludwig Von Drake, additional characters)
- Me, Eloise (additional characters)
- MegaMan NT Warrior (Lord Wily, ShadowMan, SnakeMan, additional characters)
- Mr. Men and Little Miss (Mr. Happy, Mr. Tickle, Mr. Greedy, Mr. Nosey, Mr. Bump, Mr. Funny, Mr. Clumsy, Mr. Quiet, Mr. Clever, Mr. Brave, additional characters)
- Ni Hao, Kai-Lan (Ye Ye)
- Ōban Star-Racers (additional characters)
- One Piece (Helmeppo, Jango, Captain Smoker, additional characters)
- Pet Alien (Dinko (Season 2))
- Pink Panther and Sons (additional voices)
- Pinky and the Brain (additional voices)
- Pippi Longstocking (Bloom)
- Planet 51 (Additional Voices)
- Planet Sketch (The Ninja Handyman, Japanese Fighting Fish, "Why the dinosaurs died out" narrator, additional characters)
- Popeye and Son (Popeye, Eugene the Jeep)
- Rechov Sumsum (additional characters)
- Robotboy (Dr. Kamikazi)
- RollBots (additional characters)
- Ruby Gloom (Scaredy Bat)
- Sally Bollywood: Super Detective (Harry Bollywood)
- Sandra the Fairytale Detective (additional characters)
- Sidekick (Mr. Troublemeyer /Master XOX)
- Sgt. Frog (Dororo, Masayoshi Yoshiokadaira (2nd Season), additional characters)
- Skunk Fu! (Tiger)
- Spike Team (Carlos Montero)
- Spirou et Fantasio (The Count of Champignac)
- Sitting Ducks (Raoul)
- Super Robot Monkey Team Hyperforce Go! (Gibson, Mandarin, additional characters)
- Tai Chi Chasers (Garnia)
- Tak and the Power of Juju (Banutu Steven Jibolba, Party Juju, additional characters)
- Teenage Mutant Ninja Turtles (Vernon Fenwick (second voice), additional voices)
- Teletubbies (Trumpet voice (male))
- The Adventures of Bottle Top Bill and His Best Friend Corky (Bottle Top Bill)
- The Adventures of Tintin (additional characters)
- The Daltons (additional characters)
- The Emperor's New School (Kronk)
- The Legend of Tarzan (Tantor)
- The Littles (Dinky Little)
- The Magic Roundabout (Brian)
- The Mighty B! (additional characters)
- The Mysteries of Alfred Hedgehog (Oakly, Mr. Remy)
- The Mr. Men Show (Mr. Stubborn, Mr. Tickle)
- The Penguins of Madagascar (Mort, Burt, Officer X, additional characters)
- The Replacements (additional characters)
- The Fantastic Voyages of Sinbad the Sailor (additional voices)
- The Wizard of Oz (Scarecrow, Truckle)
- TigerSharks (additional voices)
- Tiny Toon Adventures (Gogo Dodo)
- Titeuf (Grandpa, additional characters)
- Thomas the Tank Engine & Friends (Narrator)
- Tom & Jerry Kids (additional characters)
- Totally Spies! (additional characters)
- Transformers: Prime (Starscream)
- Ultimate Book of Spells (additional characters)
- What's New, Scooby-Doo? (Scooby-Doo)
- Where's Wally?: The Animated Series (Narrator)
- W.I.T.C.H. (additional characters)
- Wicked! (The Appleman)
- WordGirl (additional characters)

==== Animated and live action films/direct-to-video films ====
- 9 (5/Five)
- A Bug's Life (additional voices)
- Andre (Jack Adams (Duncan Fraser))
- Animals United (additional voices)
- Antz (additional voices)
- Arthur and the Invisibles (Darkos)
  - Arthur and the Revenge of Matazard (additional voices)
  - Arthur 3: The War of the Two Worlds (Darkos)
- Astro Boy (ZOG, Mr. Mustachio)
- Babar: The Movie (Croc, addition voices)
- Barnyard (Pip)
- Batman: Mask of the Phantasm (Harvey Bullock)
- Batman Beyond: Return of the Joker (Benjamin Knox / Bonk)
- Bee Movie (Freddy, Dad)
- Ben 10/Generator Rex: Heroes United (Humungousaur)
- Beverly Hills Chihuahua (additional voices)
- Bolt (Rhino)
- Cars (Luigi)
- Cars 2 (Luigi)
- Cars 3 (Luigi)
- Cats & Dogs: The Revenge of Kitty Galore (additional voices)
- Chicken Little (Alien Cop)
- City of Ember (Barton Snode (Toby Jones))
- Cloudy with a Chance of Meatballs (additional voices)
- Dinosaur (additional voices)
- Donkey Xote (additional voices)
- Dragon Ball movies
  - Dragon Ball: Curse of the Blood Rubies (King Gourmeth)
  - Dragon Ball: Sleeping Princess in Devil's Castle (Krillin)
  - Dragon Ball: Mystic Adventure (Krillin)
  - Dragon Ball Z: Dead Zone (Krillin)
  - Dragon Ball Z: The World's Strongest (Krillin)
  - Dragon Ball Z: The Tree of Might (Krillin)
  - Dragon Ball Z: Lord Slug (Krillin)
  - Dragon Ball Z: Cooler's Revenge (Krillin, Frieza)
  - Dragon Ball Z: The Return of Cooler (Krillin, Mr. Popo)
  - Dragon Ball Z: Super Android 13! (Krillin)
  - Dragon Ball Z: Broly – The Legendary Super Saiyan (Krillin)
  - Dragon Ball Z: Bojack Unbound (Krillin, Kogu)
  - Dragon Ball Z: Broly – Second Coming (Krillin)
  - Dragon Ball Z: Bio-Broly (Krillin)
  - Dragon Ball Z: Fusion Reborn (Frieza)
  - Dragon Ball Z: Wrath of the Dragon (Krillin)
- Dragon Hunters (Hector)
- El Cid: The Legend (additional voices)
- Ella Enchanted (additional voices)
- Enchanted (additional voices)
- Ferdinand (additional voices)
- Flushed Away (additional voices)
- Free Birds (additional voices)
- Free Willy (Di (Michael Ironside))
- Garfield: The Movie (additional voices)
- Happy Feet 2 (additional voices)
- Help! I'm a Fish (additional voices)
- Hoodwinked Too! Hood vs. Evil (Mad Hog)
- Horton Hears a Who! (Dentist)
- Howl's Moving Castle (additional voices)
- Ice Age (additional voices)
- Igor (additional voices)
- Inside Out (additional voices)
- Joseph: King of Dreams (Simeon)
- Kung Fu Panda (additional voices)
- Little Bee Julia and Lady Life (additional voices)
- Looney Tunes film series
  - Bugs Bunny's 3rd Movie: 1001 Rabbit Tales (Sylvester, Elmer Fudd, Hassan, Old Storyteller, Henzel, Genie, Mouse)
  - Looney Tunes: Back in Action (Elmer Fudd)
- Madagascar (Mort)
- Madagascar: Escape 2 Africa (Mort, Rico)
- Madagascar 3: Europe's Most Wanted (Mort, Stefano)
- Mary Poppins (additional voices)
- Meet the Robinsons (additional voices)
- Megamind (Lord Scott)
- Mirror Mirror (Brighton (Nathan Lane))
- Moana (additional voices)
- Monsters University (Yeti/The Abominable Snowman)
- Monsters vs. Aliens (Gallaxhar)
- My Little Pony: The Movie (Moochick, Grundle)
- Niko & The Way to the Stars (Smiley)
- Nim's Island (additional voices)
- Open Season (O'Toole)
- Peter Pan (Pirate voices)
- Planet 51 (additional voices)
- Popeye's Voyage: The Quest for Pappy (Popeye)
- Puss in Boots (additional voices)
- Racing Stripes (Goose)
- Ratatouille (Skinner)
- Robots (additional voices)
- Scooby-Doo 2: Monsters Unleashed (10,000 Volt Ghost, Black Knight Ghost, additional voices)
- Shark Tale (additional voices)
- Sharpay's Fabulous Adventure (Mr. Gonzez (Jorge Molina), Sound Engineer (Christian Potenza))
- Shrek series (The Gingerbread Man)
  - Shrek 2
  - Shrek the Third
  - Shrek the Halls
  - Shrek Forever After (Rumpelstiltskin)
- Sinbad: Legend of the Seven Seas (Rat)
- Smallfoot (additional voices)
- Sml Fry (additional voices)
- Space Buddies (Yuri (Diedrich Bader))
- Space Chimps 2: Zartog Strikes Back (Zartog)
- Speed Racer (Mr. Musha (Hiroyuki Sanada), Jack 'Cannonbl' Taylor (Rph Herforth), Announcer)
- Spies in Disguise (additional voices)
- Spirit: Stallion of the Cimarron (additional voices)
- Spirited Away (additional voices)
- Star Wars: The Clone Wars (Ziro the Hutt)
- Stuart Little (Lucky)
- Stuart Little 3: Call of the Wild (Troopmaster Bickle)
- Surf's Up (additional voices)
- The Adventures of Pinocchio (Pastry shop baker (Marcello Magni), The Coachman (Jean-Claude Dreyfus))
- The Adventures of Tintin: The Secret of the Unicorn (Thomson)
- The Angry Birds Movie (Chuck)
- The Ant Bully (Wasp Survivor)
- The Cat in the Hat (additional voices)
- The Gruffo (Owl)
  - The Gruffo's Child (Owl)
- The Land Before Time II: The Great Valley Adventure (Petrie)
- The Legend of Secret Pass (Chuckster)
- The Little Mermaid II: Return to the Sea (Tip)
- The Living Forest (Hu-Hu)
- The Mighty Kong (additional voices)
- The Muppets (Gonzo the Great)
- The Nut Job (additional voices)
- The Prince of Egypt (additional voices)
- The Rale Shlemiel (Treitel, Peddler)
- The Rescuers (Mr. Snoops, Deacon Owl)
- The Rugrats Movie (Drew Pickles, Sergant)
- The Simpsons Movie (Moe Szyslak, Apu Nahasapeemapetilon, Chief Wiggum, Comic Book Guy, Janitor)
- The Spiderwick Chronicles (additional voices)
- The SpongeBob SquarePants Movie (Perch Perkins)
- The Tale of Despereaux (Boldo)
- The Three Musketeers (Porthos)
- The Ugly Duckling and Me! (Wesley)
- The Water Horse: Legend of the Deep (Lt. Wormsley (Erroll Shand))
- The Wild (additional voices)
- Thomas and the Magic Railroad (Thomas the Tank Engine)
- Tinker Bell (Clank, The Minister of Autumn)
  - Tinker Bell and the Lost Treasure (Clank, The Minister of Autumn)
  - Tinker Bell and the Great Fairy Rescue (Clank, Driver)
  - Pixie Hollow Games (Clank, Starter Sparrowman)
  - Secret of the Wings (Clank)
- TMNT (Gener Gato)
- Tom and Jerry: A Nutcracker Tale (Tom, additional voices)
- Tony Hawk in Boom Boom Sabotage (additional voices)
- Top Cat: The Movie (Officer Dibble)
- Up (Gamma)
  - Dug's Special Mission (Gamma)
- Valiant (Big Thug)
- WALL-E (additional voices)
- Zambezia (additional voices)
- Zootopia (additional voices)

==== Games ====
- Tiny Toon Adventures: Buster and the Beanstalk (additional voices)
