= Lillian Barreto =

Israeli actress

- ליליאן ברטו
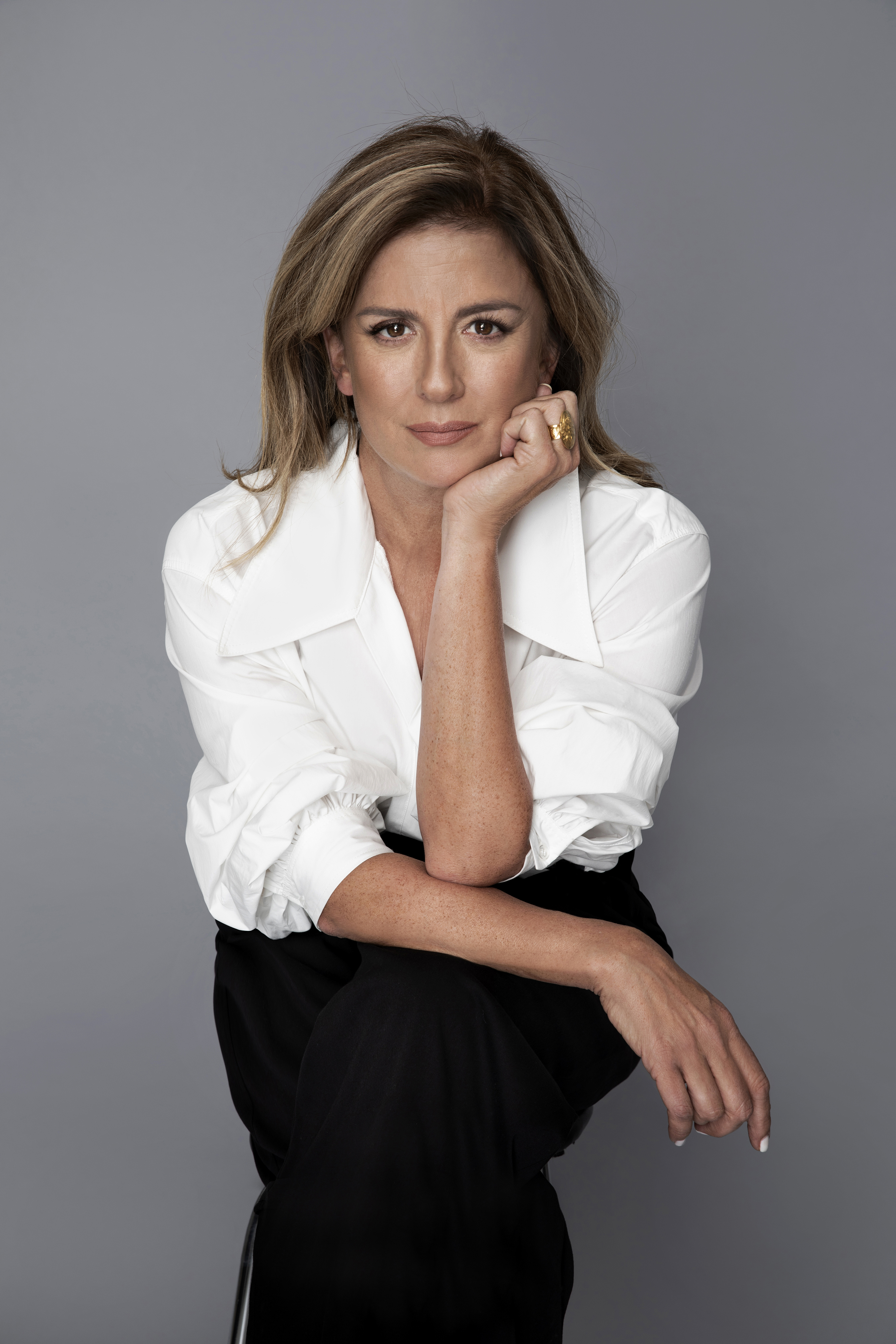
- Barreto in 2021
- Born: 6 November 1966 (age 59); Caracas, Venezuela
- Other name: Lillian Barto
- Occupations: Actress; voice actress
- Years active: 1988–present
- Spouse(s): Hanoch Levin (m. 1995; died 1999) Moran Palmoni (m. 2004)
- Children: 2

Lillian Barreto (Hebrew: ליליאן ברטו; born 6 November 1966) is a Venezuelan-born Israeli actress.
