= Yosef Carmon =

Israeli actor (1933–2022)

- יוסף כרמון
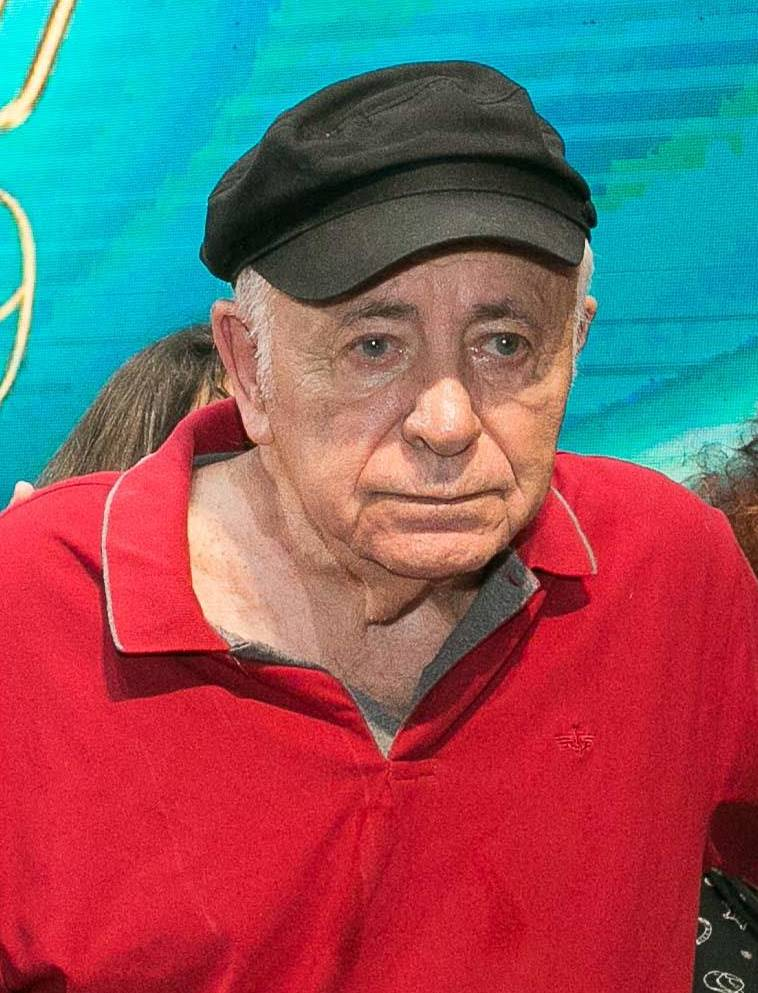
- Carmon in 2019
- Born: Yosef Korman; 14 June 1933; Radom, Second Polish Republic
- Died: 2 March 2022 (aged 88); Tel Aviv, Israel
- Occupations: Actor; theatre director
- Years active: 1953–2019
- Children: 4, including Asaf Korman

Yosef Carmon (Hebrew: יוסף כרמון; 14 June 1933 – 2 March 2022) was an Israeli actor and theatre director.

== Biography ==
Born in Radom in 1933 to parents who were both tanners and the only son out of five children, Carmon's parents and three of his sisters were killed in the Treblinka extermination camp during the Holocaust. However, he and his surviving sister fled from persecution and they made aliyah in 1946 along with other orphans from the Holocaust. After arriving in Israel, Carmon lived in Degania Bet, where he worked in a chicken coop and a carpentry shop before serving in the IDF. After his performance in the military band, he was recommended for performing at the Cameri Theatre. He studied acting and directing in London, Middlesex.

== Career ==
=== Stage ===
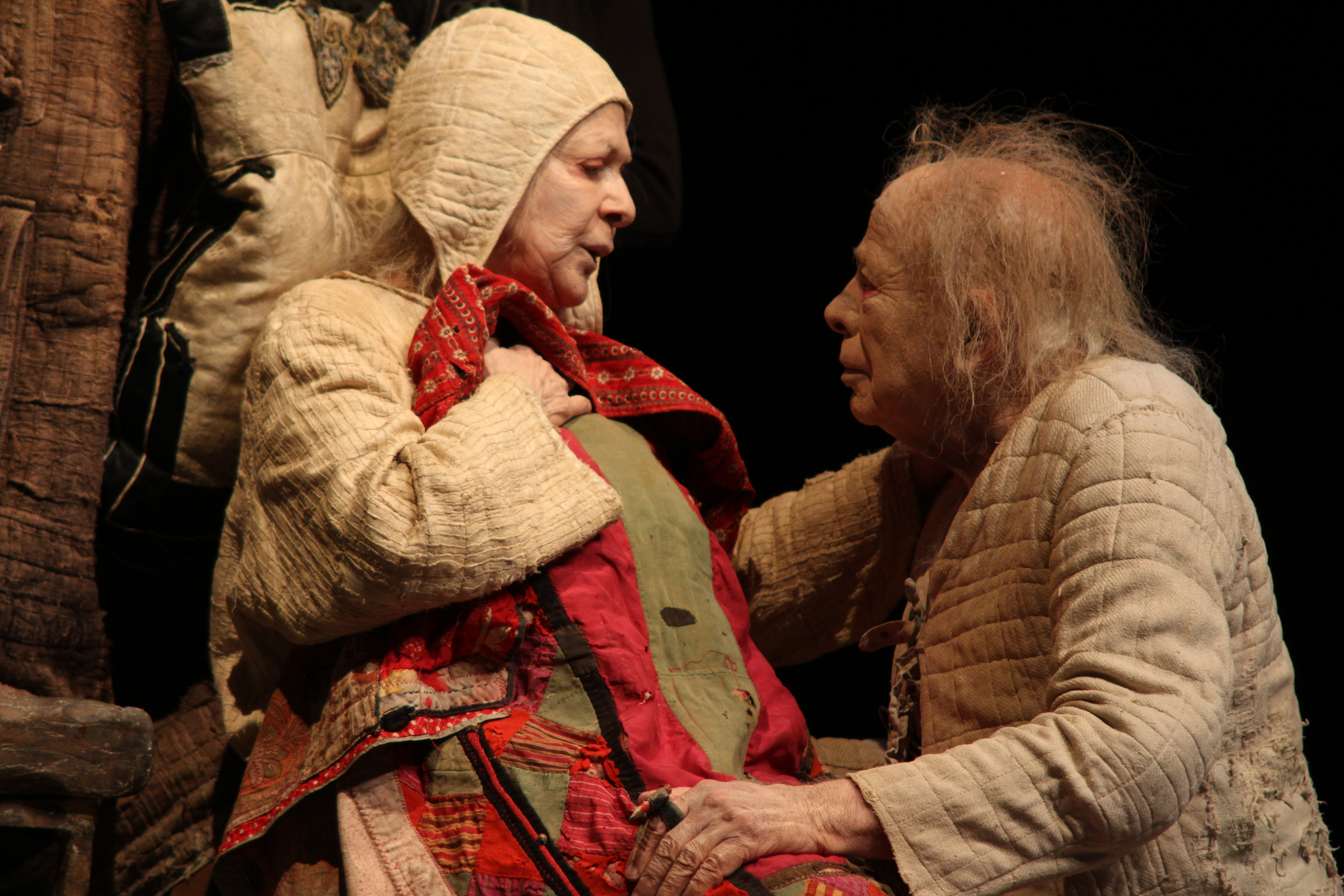
Yosef Carmon in Hanoch Levin's play Requiem with Rivka Gur

Between 1953 and 1959, he started work at the Cameri Theatre and after returning from the London Academy of Music and Dramatic Art, he began acting in Israeli plays and films. Carmon was an actor at the Cameri Theater for over 50 years, participating in 40 plays, of them 17 by playwright Hanoch Levin, including the title role in Job's Passion, for which he received the "David's Harp" award. Carmon also directed several plays at the theater, including some of Levin's works.

=== Film ===
In 1963, Carmon made his debut film appearance in the film Not a Word to Morgenstein directed by Arieh Elias. He was also featured in Avraham Heffner’s 1972 film But Where Is Daniel Wax?. Some of his other film appearances include Alila, Mr. Baum, Aunt Clara and Tel Aviv - Berlin. Some of his prominent later film appearances include Epilogue (2013) and The Farewell Party (2014).

== Awards ==
- The Kinor David award for stage acting (Job's Passion)
- The Cameri Prize
- The Moshe HaLevi Lifetime Achievement award
- The Rosenblum Lifetime Achievement award

== Personal life and death ==
Carmon was married and had four children, Tzvika, Asaf, Avital and Michal, who are all in the entertainment industry. Asaf and his wife are also actors.

In 2014, Carmon was diagnosed with dementia. He gradually decreased his activity as an actor before retiring for good in 2019.

Carmon died as a result of his illness on 2 March 2022, at the age of 88.
