= Edna Shavit =

Israeli academic (1935–2015)

- עדנה שביט
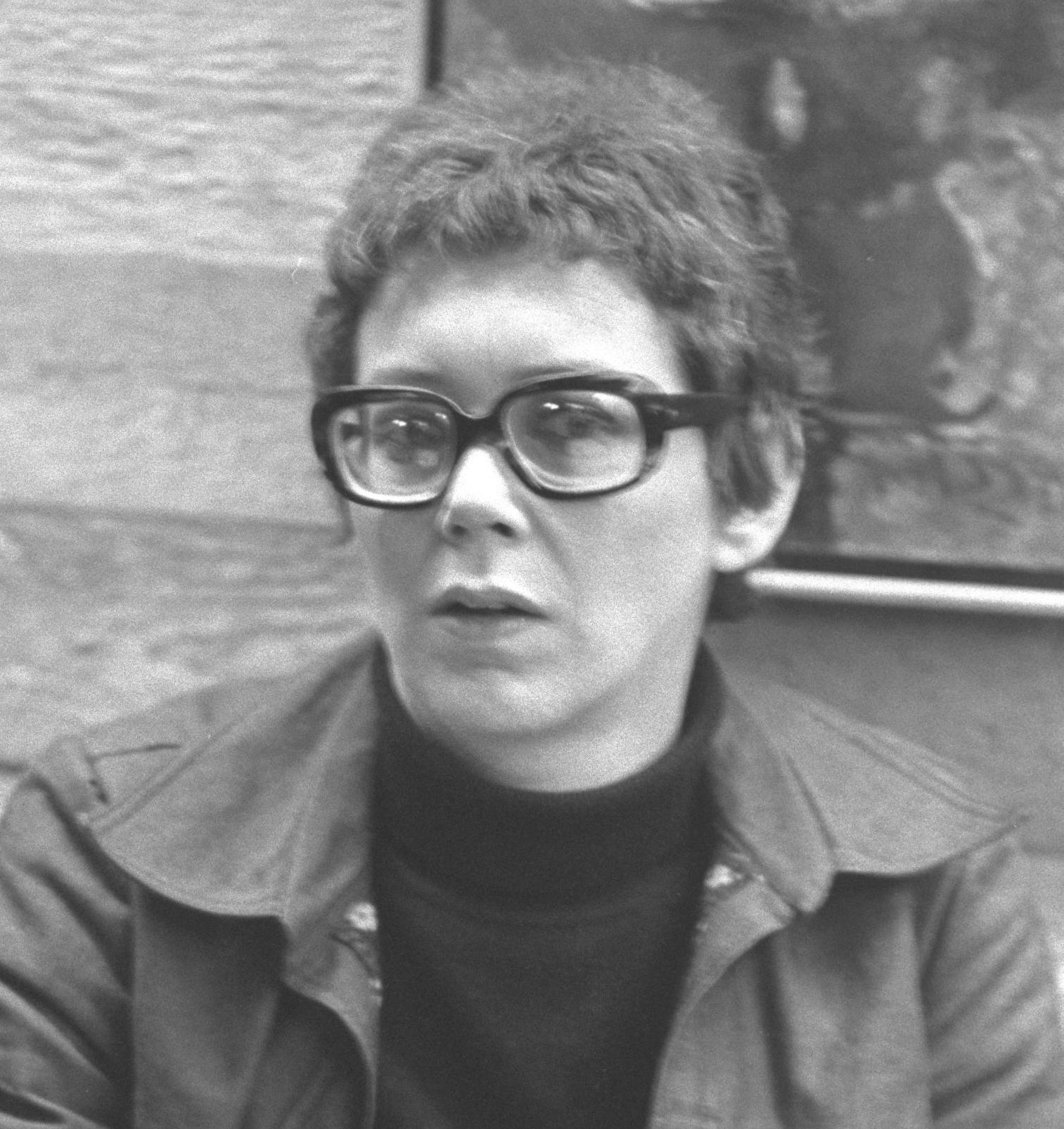
- Born: April 25, 1935; Israel
- Died: 14 June 2015 (aged 80)
- Spouse: Yoram Gal (1994-2003)

Edna Shavit (Hebrew: עדנה שביט; 25 April 1935 – 14 June 2015) was an Emeritus Professor in the Department of Theater Arts at the Faculty of Arts of Tel Aviv University, a theater director, translator, screenwriter, lecturer, actress, journalist, radio playwright, editor, and broadcaster for the radio stations Galei Zahal and Kol Yisrael.

== Biography ==
Shavit was born in Haifa.

In the 1960s, after gaining some experience in the Nahal Troupe of the IDF, she joined the Zira Theatre (lit. Stage Theatre), an avant-garde theater founded by Michael Almaz, which was the first theater in Israel to stage Samuel Beckett's play Waiting for Godot (under the title: "We Are Waiting for Mara'al"). Shavit played the character Lucky.

Shavit studied English literature and philosophy at the Hebrew University of Jerusalem. She held a bachelor's degree from Tel Aviv University in Hebrew Literature and Theatre Arts. She traveled for a two-year specialization in Cinema in the United States. Following this, she began teaching acting and directing in the Theatre Department in Tel Aviv University.

Shavit directed over one hundred productions in every institutionalized theatre in Israel. She was the first Israeli woman to enter into the field of directing, which was considered an exclusively male domain before that.

In 1968, Shavit directed the first work of Hanoch Levin, "You and I and the Next War". This play evoked very harsh reactions from the public following the Six-Day War, and is still considered a landmark in Israeli political theatre.

Shavit directed many classic plays, such as "Oedipus Rex" by Sophocles at the Habima Theater (1978), as well as Absurdist plays, such as "Waiting for Godot" by Samuel Beckett, which she translated and directed several times at various theatres in Israel.

She was active in the fields of journalism, radio drama, translation, radio broadcasting, and more.

In 2006, she was awarded the Levi Prize for life achievement.

Shavit served as a Professor of Theatre at Tel Aviv University, and retired as an Emerita Professor.

She lived in Tel Aviv. She has a son with Rafi Tavor. For a certain period, she was in relationships with the actor and broadcaster Alex Ansky and with the actor, director, and painter Yoram Gal.

Edna Shavit died at her home in 2015, at the age of 80.
