= Hanoch Levin =

Israeli writer (1943–1999)

- חנוך לוין
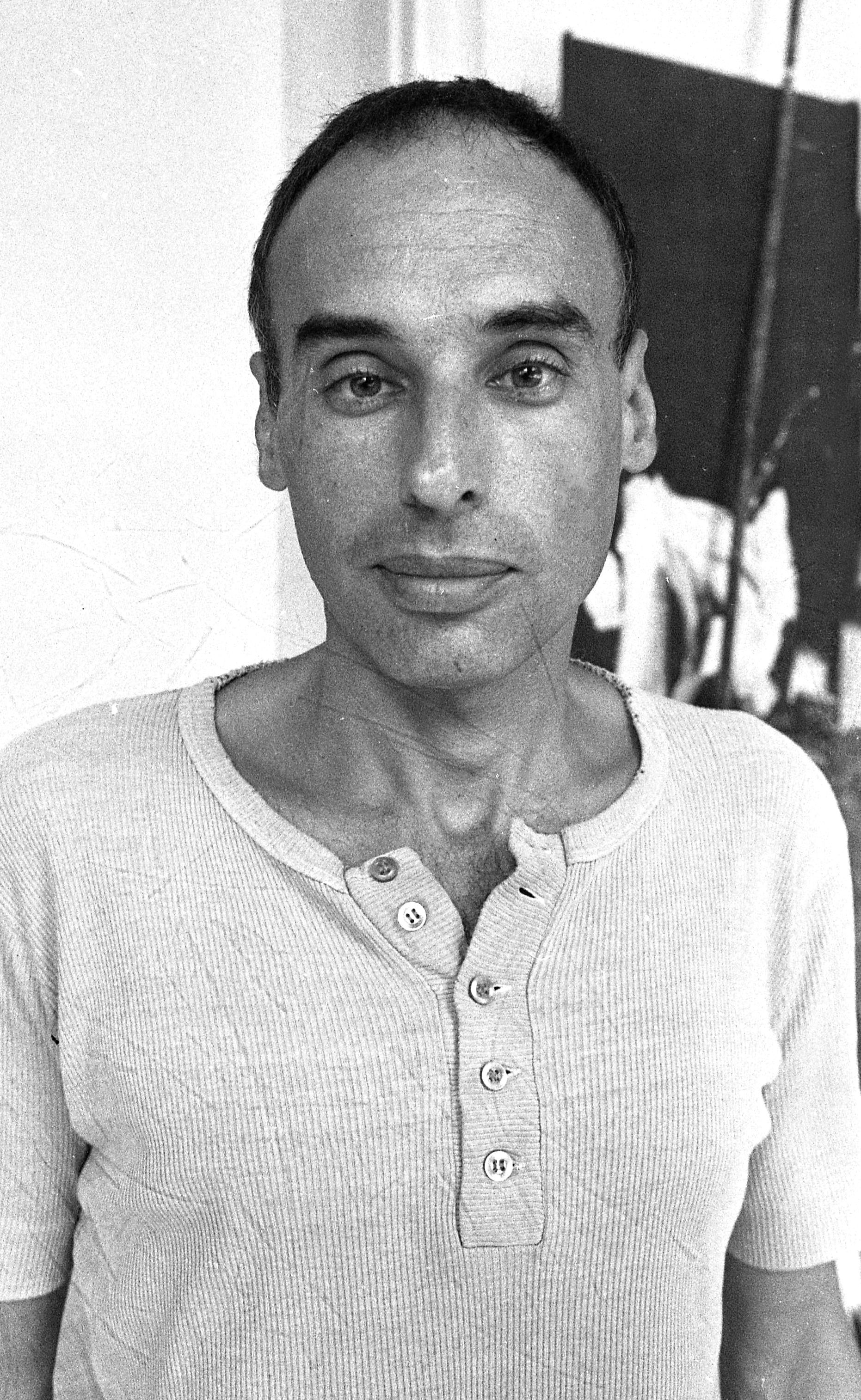
- Levin in 1982
- Born: 18 December 1943; Tel Aviv, Mandatory Palestine
- Died: 18 August 1999 (aged 55); Tel Aviv, Israel
- Citizenship: Israeli
- Education: Tel Aviv University
- Occupations: Playwright; theatre director; screenwriter; poet
- Children: 4
- Awards: 1994 Bialik Prize for literature

Hanoch Levin (Hebrew: חנוך לוין; 18 December 1943 – 18 August 1999) was an Israeli screenwriter, theatre director, screenwriter, and poet, best known for his plays. His absurdist style is often compared to the work of Harold Pinter and Samuel Beckett.

Upon his death in 1999, a New York Times obituary referred to him as "Israel's leading playwright".

== Biography ==
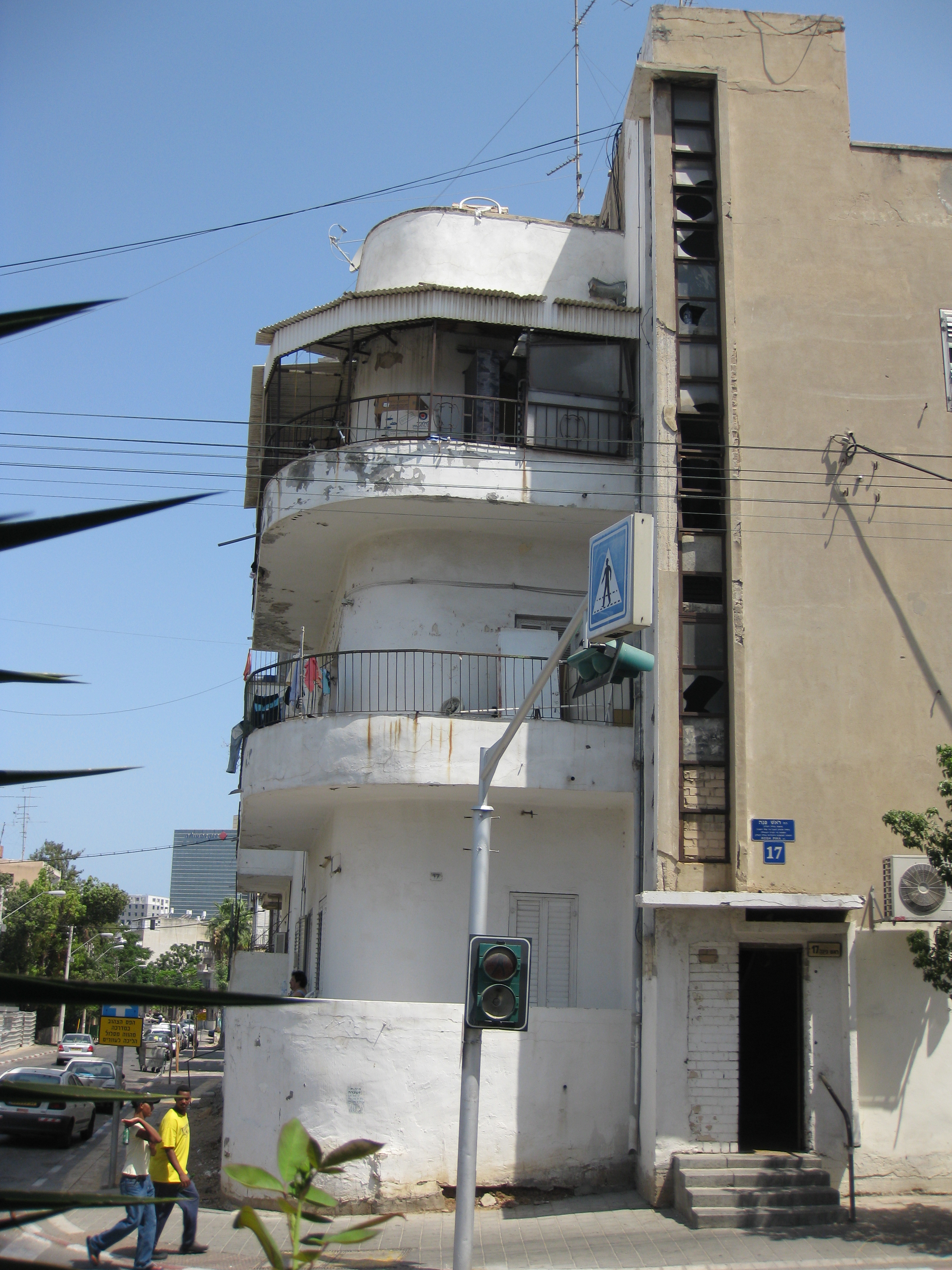
Hanoch Levin's childhood home

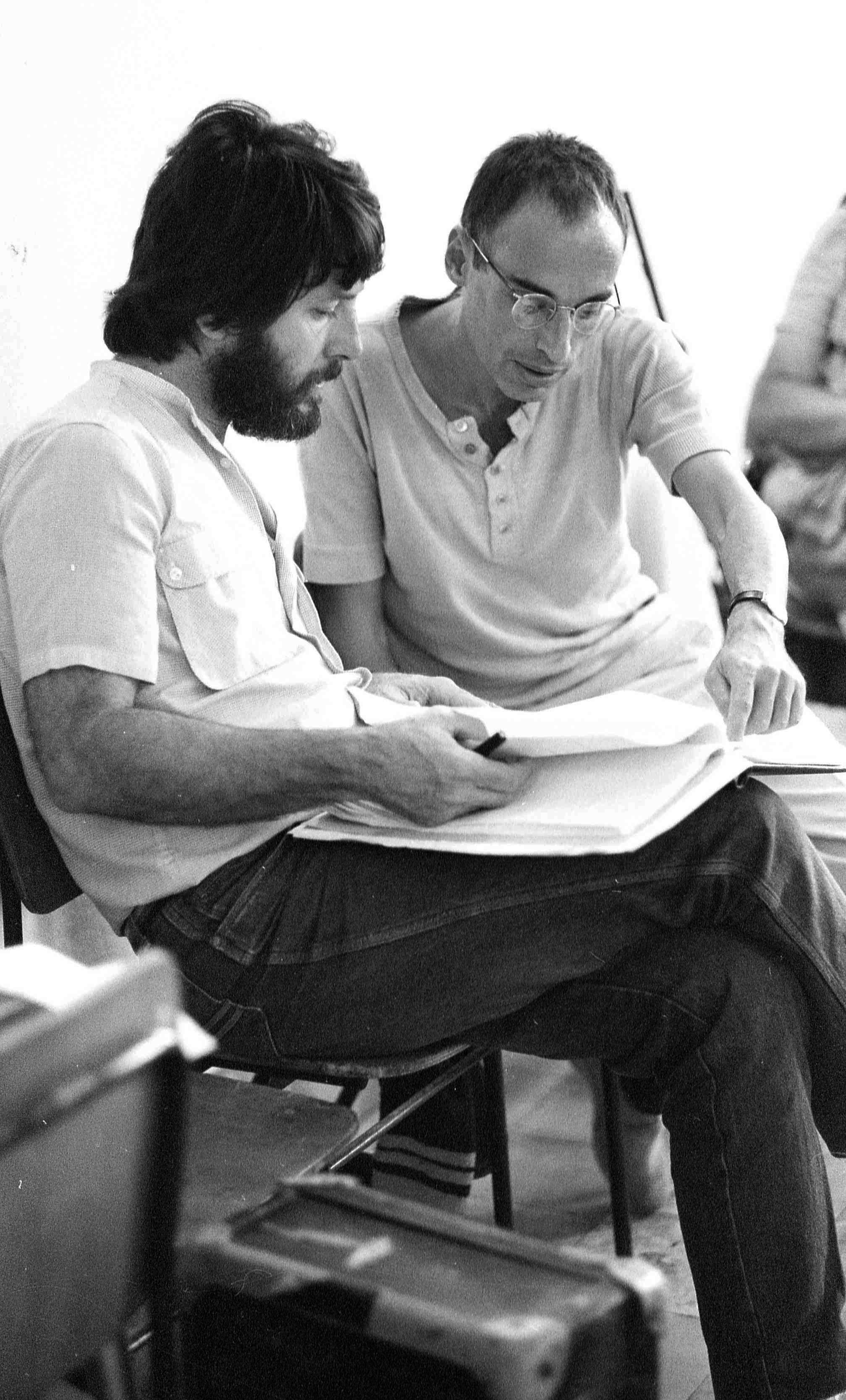
Levin and Oded Kotler during work on the play "The Patriot", 1982

Levin was born in 1943 to Malka and Israel Levin, who immigrated to then-British Mandate of Palestine in 1935 (now Israel) from Łódź, Poland. He grew up in a religious Jewish home in the Neve Sha'anan neighborhood in southern Tel Aviv. His father ran a grocery store.

As a child, he attended the Yavetz State Religious School. In the 1950s, his brother, David, who was nine years older than he was, worked as an assistant director at the Cameri Theater. His father died of a heart attack when he was 12 years old. Hanoch attended Zeitlin Religious High School in Tel Aviv. After ninth grade, he left school to help support the family. He worked as a messenger boy for the Herut company and took classes at a night school for working youth at the Ironi Aleph middle school. There he joined a drama club and acted in Michal, Daughter of Saul by Aharon Ashman.

After serving his compulsory military duty as a code clerk in the signal corps, Levin began to study philosophy and Hebrew literature at Tel Aviv University (1964–67). In 1965 he joined the editorial board of the Dorban newspaper, one of the university's two student newspapers. Some passages from the period were republished, with thorough revisions, as part of his later work. For example, "A Hardened Ballad of a Soldier Man and Woman" from June 1966 was revised as "Black Eagle on a Red Roof" and published after the 1982 Lebanon War.

During his university studies, Levin associated with the Communist Party, where he met Danny Tracz, the dramatist of the Communist youth. A friendship and professional kinship developed between the two that lasted beyond the period of their party activities.

Levin was known for his refusal to give interviews. In one of the few interviews that he gave at the beginning of his career (to Michael Handelzalts from Israel Defense Forces Radio), he answered the question "Why do you write specifically for the theater?":" I just think, the theater, it's much more charming, much more involving when you see these things on the stage. It's just much more exciting, I don't know why... you see the world, that way, formed on the stage. I don't know whether the material takes on a different quality, or it's better or worse, but in any case for me it's more exciting, material that's produced on the stage."

== Literary and theater career ==
In 1967, Levin published a poem called "Birkot ha-Shahar" (the name of the Jewish "dawn blessings") in the literary journal Yochani, and was met with critical acclaim. The poem was later reprinted in his poetry collection Lives of the Dead. In Haaretz he published the stories "Stubborn Dina" (1966) and "Pshishpsh" (1971, also published in the book The Eternal Invalid and the Beloved), as well as the verse cycles "Party Song of the Wicked: An Idyll" (1968, later appeared in Lives of the Dead) and "Flawed People" (1970). Following Meir Wieseltier's invitations, he began in 1971 to publish stories, poems, and verse in the literary journal Exclamation Point (סימן קריאה): "The World of the Sycophantes" in 1973, "A Hunchback Finds a Prostitute" in 1976, "Lives of the Dead" in 1981, and others.

Also in 1967, Levin sent a radio play called Catch the Spy to a radio drama competition at Kol Israel, winning first prize. The show, under the direction of David Levin, was broadcast several times. Levin's translation into English won first prize in 1969 in a radio drama competition in Italy. It was later published in the book Finale.

In 1967–70, Levin devoted himself to political satire. In March 1968 he began working on a cabaret show entitled You, Me and the Next War, with Edna Shavit. The show was mounted in August 1968 at the Bar-Barim club in Tel Aviv by four of Shavit's students from the theatre department at Tel Aviv University: Bat-Sheva Zeisler, Shifra Milstein, Gad Keynar and Rami Peleg. Danny Tracz was the producer. Next, Levin wrote a satire called Ketchup. Under the direction of his brother, David, it was performed in the basement of the Satirical Cabaret in Tel Aviv in March 1969. In these two works, Levin mocked Israeli military pathos (as in the parody "Victory Parade for the 11 Minutes War" of the victory speech by General Shmuel Gonen at the close of the Six-Day War), the impotence and complacency of Israel's politicians ("Peace Talks in the Middle East"), and presented a macabre treatment of bereavement ("Squares in the Cemetery").

The criticism directed at Levin following You, and Me and the Next War and Ketchup deepened after the premiere of his third political play, Shampoo Queen ("מלכת אמבטיה"), produced by the Cameri Theater in April 1970. David Levin directed the controversial play, which made pointed use of vulgarity, and contained provocative sketches such as "The Binding" in which Isaac begs his father Abraham not to hesitate to slaughter him, and "The Courting" which mocks Israeli volubility and arrogance. Perhaps because it was presented on the stage of an established theater, the play aroused an unprecedented storm of public opinion. Viewers protested and made a disturbance during the performances. The National Religious Party demanded censorship of a song that, in its opinion, profaned the honor of the Bible. The government threatened to withdraw its financial support from the theater. The criticism further addressed the play itself: "a combination of flawed dialogues and ditties attempting to toss salt on our open wounds" (Dr. Haim Gamzu); "This 'theatrash' (mahazevel) makes us all out to be despicable killers, citizens of a militarist, bloodthirsty state." (Uri Porat); and "a scene about a reporter, who comes to interview a young widow whose husband died in the trenches, and makes love with her, only a demonic or infirm mind could devise... it's a malicious abuse of thousands of bereaved parents" (Reuven Yanai). In spite of Levin's objections, the theater's management decided, in the wake of these outraged responses, to close the show after only nineteen performances.

== Critical acclaim ==
Levin's first "artistic" play was the comedy Solomon Grip, which premiered in May 1969 at the Open Theater under direction of Hillel Ne'eman. He achieved his first great public success with his next comedy, Chefez, which was mounted on the stage of the Haifa Theater in March 1972, directed by Oded Kotler. This play had previously been passed up by the Cameri and Habima. His next play, Yaacobi and Leidental [Temporary title], the first that Levin also directed, was first presented in December 1972 at the Cameri Theater. During the 1970s, he continued to write and direct plays that primarily appeared at the Haifa Theater and Cameri (see the list of plays below). During this period Levin also wrote two screenplays: Floch, directed by Danny Wolman in 1972, and Fantasy on a Romantic Theme, directed by Vitek Tracz in 1977. The two movies earned the acclaim of critics, but not the public.

The next great tempest occurred in the wake of the play The Torments of Job in 1981. The play included a scene in which the naked Job, in the person of Yosef Carmon, is impaled through his anus on a pole by the Caesar's soldiers, and is sold to a circus so that his death throes can draw a crowd. Miriam Taaseh-Glazer, at the time the Deputy Minister of Education and Culture, announced from the Knesset dais that the State need not fund a theater "where a naked guy hangs for ten minutes with all his privates waving around." Levin's next play, The Great Whore of Babylon (1982), aroused opposition even among his colleagues the Cameri Theater actors, chiefly Yossi Yadin. Following this opposition, the play was cut by 20 minutes.

Levin returned to political writing in The Patriot, which opened October 1982 at the Neve Zedek Theater, directed by Oded Kotler. The play is about an Israeli citizen who asks to emigrate to the United States. The American consul asks him to spit on his mother, kick an Arab boy's face, and afterward, to taunt God. Although the Council for Film and Drama Criticism banned the entire play, Kottler decided to present it. Yitzhak Zamir, then the government's legal counsel, recommended indictments against the theater management for transgressing censorship law. The play was allowed to go on only after it was edited.

During the 1980s, some of the critics charged that Levin was repeating material in his plays (Yakish and Puptche, The Deliberator), although his later plays (The Child Dreams, Walkers in the Dark, Requiem) received widespread acclaim.

In 1994, The Child Dreams was adapted as a television film by noted Israeli director Ram Loevy. The opera The Child Dreams, composed by Gil Shohat, premiered in January 2010 on the occasion of the 25th anniversary of the Israeli Opera. Sets and costumes were designed by Gottfried Helnwein, and the production was directed by Omri Nitzan, Artistic Director of the Cameri Theater, who also helped Shohat adapt the play into the libretto.

Levin also wrote popular songs ("Mr. Almost and Mrs. Already" recorded by Yehudit Ravitz, "What Does the Bird Care" and "Not Enough Room for Two on the Electric Pole" recorded by Aharit Hayamim, "I Live From Day to Day" recorded by Rita, "London" recorded by Chava Alberstein); published two books of prose (The Eternal Invalid and the Beloved and A Man Stands Behind a Seated Woman) and a book of poetry (Lives of the Dead); and composed and directed episodes of the TV show Layla Gov ("How We Played -Pranks of Chupak and Afchuk").

== Dramatic themes and style ==
Nurit Yaari divides Levin's plays into three general categories, based on their themes, characters and theatrical forms:

- Satirical Cabarets – Levin’s early political pieces, “a straightforward reaction to the political reality prevailing at the time of their presentation…Levin’s cabarets are composed of a series of sketches interspersed with songs”
- Domestic Comedies – Plays focused on small, representative elements of society: individuals, families, friends and neighbors, “the dramatic space of these plays extends between the home, as the smallest unit, and the neighborhood. The city and country are not mentioned” In this group Yaari identifies three subcategories:
  - Courtship and marriage
  - A particular family
  - A neighborhood.
- Spectacles of Doom – Levin’s philosophical and mythical works, which are usually based on ancient myths and biblical texts. These plays vary greatly in terms of plot, structure and the myths they draw upon, but habitually display similar themes such as: “the agonies and humiliations suffered by people” and “the futility of human suffering” as well as the recurring motifs of “degradation and death”

== Personal life ==
Levin was married three times, to Naava Koresh, Edna Koren and his wife in the last years of his life was actress and dubber Lillian Barreto. He had four children.

=== Death ===
Levin died of bone cancer on August 18, 1999. He continued to work even in the hospital, nearly to his last day, but didn't have time to finish the staging of his play Whiners. During his lifetime he wrote 56 plays, 43 of which were produced.

In Israel, his death was met with grave dismay by the cultural establishment, as well as in political circles. Prime Minister Ehud Barak, paid tribute, referring to Levin as "one of the greatest playwrights that Israel has ever had."

The Education Minister, Yossi Sarid, added that Levin "showed us what we really looked like when we were still saying, 'Surely, that can't be us.'" He continued: "Levin saved us because without him we wouldn't have known that the social and political ulcer was about to explode."

== Legacy ==
Since his death, Levin continues to influence Israeli culture, and his plays continue to be produced in Israel and overseas, particularly in Poland and the United States.

In 2006, The Whore from Ohio (1997) was staged at La MaMa Experimental Theatre Club in the East Village in Manhattan. In the same year, Job's Passion (1981) was staged at Theater for the New City in New York City.

In 2011, Suitcase Packers (1983) was revived at the Cameri Theater in Tel Aviv. In the same year, Winter Funeral (1978) was adapted at Theater for the New City in New York City by Laurel Hessing and retitled Winter Wedding.

Since his death, Levin's plays have become popular in Poland. In 2012, Labour of Life (1981) was staged at the National Theatre in Warsaw in Poland by director Jan Englert. In 2015, Levin's posthumous plays, Romantics (2002) and Move My Heart (2005) were staged at TR Warszawa in Warsaw.

In 2018, New Yiddish Rep staged a Yiddish-language adaptation of Labour of Life and The Whore from Ohio at Rattlestick Playwrights Theater in the West Village of Manhattan.

In 2019, three-volume anthology of 15 plays by Levin was released in English by British publisher, Oberon Books.

In 2023, the Israeli musical film, Victory, which deals with the Six-Day War, prominently includes a Tel Aviv fringe production of Levin's You, Me And The Next War (1968) on a Kibbutz.

== Awards and recognition ==
In 1994, Levin was the co-recipient (jointly with Meir Wieseltier) of the Bialik Prize for literature.

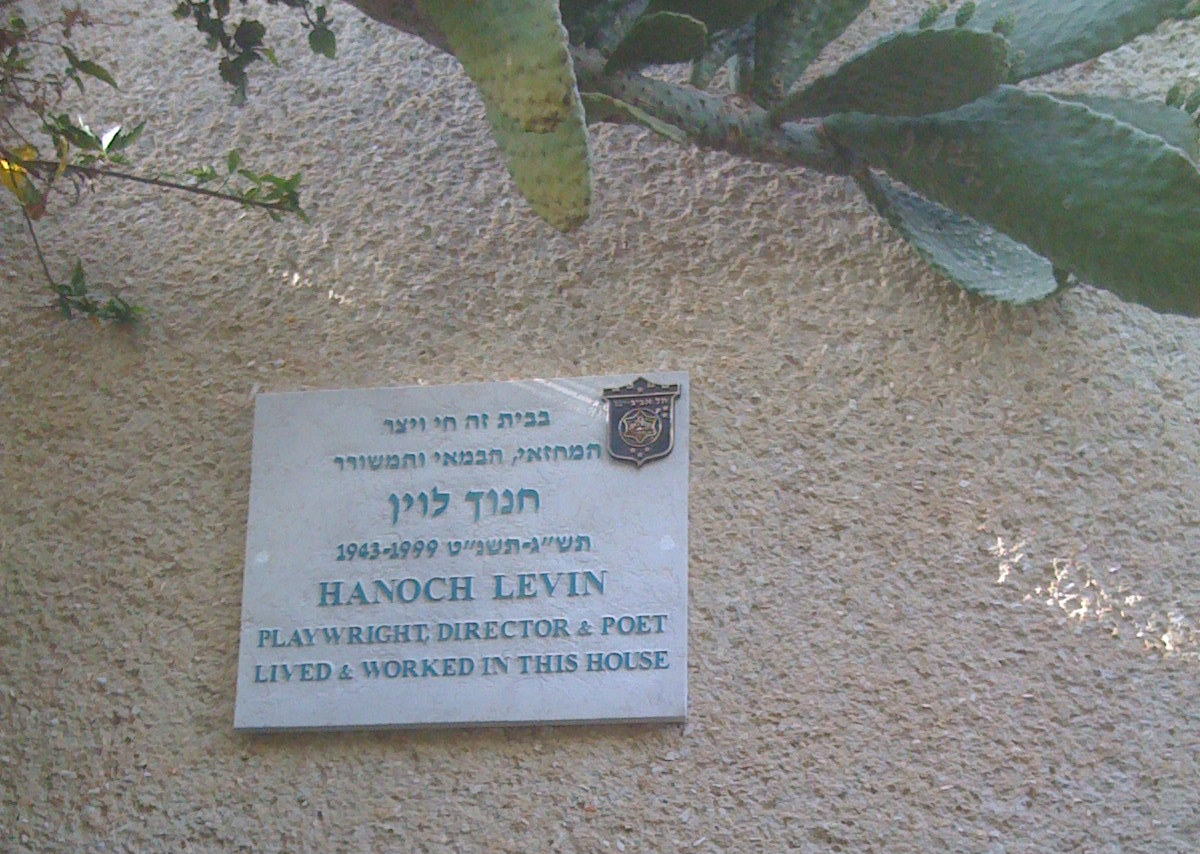
Memorial sign for Hanoch Levin on his house in Tel Aviv

Levin's death brought new interest in his early stage works. The Israeli Theater Habimah performed several plays by Levin. An updated version of the political satire "You, Me and the Next War" was staged from 2004 through 2008 by the original crew with Bart Berman at the piano.

In 2000, the musician Dudi Levi released the disk Hanoch Levin Project, comprising eleven songs whose words Hanoch Levin composed.

== Published works ==
=== Plays ===
- Chefetz
- Solomon Grip
- Yaacobi and Leidental [Temporary title]
- Vardaleh's Youth
- Schitz
- Krum
- Popper
- Rubber Merchants
- Winter Funeral
- Suitcase Packers
- Execution
- The Torments of Job
- The Great Whore of Babylon
- The Lost Women of Troy
- Everyone Wants to Live
- Yakish and Puptche
- Submissive and Defeated
- The Labor of Life
- The Deliberator
- The Child Dreams
- Oops and Oopla
- The Wonderful Woman Inside Us
- The Whore from Ohio
- Mouths Agape
- The Conqueror
- Decapitation
- Rape Trial
- The Man with the Knife in the Middle
- Elmo and Ruth
- Anxious and Frightened
- Walkers in the Dark
- Murder
- Must Be Punished
- Bachelors and Bachelorettes
- The Constant Mourner
- The Emperor
- Shozes & Bjijina
- Kludog the Miserable King
- The Clingers
- Redemption
- And a Kiss for the Aunt
- Emperor Gok
- All the Queen's Men
- A Servant's Devotion to his Rigorous Lady
- Romantics
- Requiem
- Thrill My Heart
- The Janitors
- Ikhsh Fisher
- Morris Shimel
- The Thin Soldier
- The Lamenters
- The Watcher
- Writhe and Twist
- The Simulant
- Theophano the Beautiful

=== Sketches, revues and cabarets ===
- You, me and the next war
- Ketchup
- Shampoo Queen
- The Patriot
- The Gigolo from Congo

=== Screenplays ===
- Floch'
- Fantasy on a Romantic Theme
- The Beloved from Poland
- Angela
- Apprenticeship Story

=== Prose ===
- The Eternal Invalid and The Beloved
- A Man Stands Behind a Seated Woman
- Ishel and Romanzka

=== Poetry ===
- The Blessings of Dawn (1965)
- Friends' Party Poem (1967)
- Lives of the Dead (1980)
- As a Breeze Blows (1981)
- Farewell Rhymes to a Beloved (1998)
- Farewell Letters to a Beloved (1998)

=== Children's books ===
- The Happy, Cheerful Cock
- Uncle Max's Journey

== See also ==
- List of Bialik Prize recipients
- Theater of Israel
- Culture of Israel
