= Tal Itzhaki =

Israeli theatre designer (born 1956)

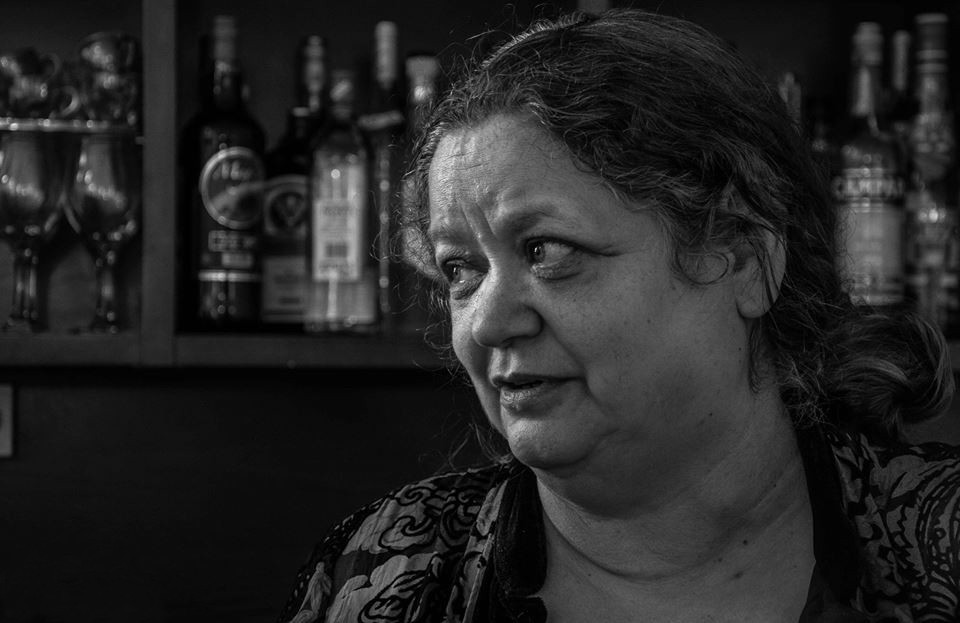
- Theatre Designer and Director of the Academy of Performing Arts, Tel Aviv
- Born: March 1, 1956 (age 70); Tel Aviv, Israel
- Spouse: Avraham Oz
- Website: research.haifa.ac.il/~theatre/itzhaki.html

Tal Itzhaki (Hebrew: טל יצחקי; born March 1, 1956) is an Israeli theatre designer and director of the Academy of Performing Arts, Tel Aviv, a translator of plays and prose into Hebrew.

== Biography ==
Tal Itzhaki was born 1 March 1956 in Tel Aviv, Israel, to Dr Yedidya Itzhaki, architect and Professor Emeritus of Hebrew Literature at Bar-Ilan University and Rina Itzhaki, educator at the Kibbutzim College of Education. She is married to Israeli Professor of theatre at the University of Haifa and translator of drama and poetry Avraham Oz.

=== Education ===
Itzhaki earned a Senior Art Teacher degree from the HaMidrasha School of Art (now HaMidrasha – Faculty of the Arts of Beit Berl College), Israel (1977), where she studied (among others) under painters such as Raffi Lavie, Eliahu Gat, Yair Garbuz and Shlomo Vitkin; and a B.A. in theatre design (1982) from Tel Aviv University, where she studied under designers such as Lydia Pincus-Gani, Eli Sinai and Ben-Tzion Munitz. She is currently a PhD candidate in Theatre at Tel Aviv University

=== Career ===
Tal Itzhaki has been the director of the Academy of Performing Arts, Tel Aviv since its establishment in 2010. She taught at Tel Aviv University Theatre Department, at the WIZO Haifa Academy of Design and Education and served as Senior Lecturer at the Sapir Academic College. She founded the program of theatre design at the Department of Theatre at the University of Haifa which she headed for 9 years (1996-2004). Between 2003 and 2005 she was a visiting artist at Columbia University, New York, where she designed and produced, together with fellow director Amit Gazit, productions such as Hanoch Levin's Luggage Packers, and co-authored "Neighbors", an adapted "contamination" collage of Levin's plays and "Xandra compelled to speak", a theatrical piece based on Euripides' Trojan Women and texts by 16 other authors, classical and modern.

=== TV ===
Itzhaki also designed TV shows, among them "The Ya'acov Shabtai Songs Show," (1997); "Homage to Kibbutzim," (1997), and others.

=== Other Activities ===
Together with fellow designer Moshe Sternfeld, playwright Hanoch Levin and others, Itzhaki was one of the initiators and founders of the first Fringe Centre in Tel Aviv. She served for many years the General Secretary of AMBI, the Israeli organization of stage designers, curated numerous stage design exhibitions in Israel and abroad, among them six exhibitions of Israeli stage design at the Prague Quadrennial (1991-2011) and the pioneering and much acclaimed and attended "Fashion Show", a gigantic retrospective exhibition of the history of stage and costume design in Israel at the large foyers of the Jerusalem Theatre (2008-9). Itzhaki has published articles on scenography in professional and academic journals and books, and organized international conferences on the subject. She was the Israeli delegate on the professional committees of OISTAT, the International Organisation of Scenographers, Theatre Architects and Technicians, and was active in IFTR, the international federation of theatre research. Itzhaki lectured, led seminars and workshop and served as member of professional jury in international design competitions, all those in Prague, Amsterdam, United States, Antwerp, Lisbon, Ebora, Munich, Jaipur, Seoul, Gothenburg and elsewhere. She served twice as a juror at the Acco Festival of Alternative Israeli Theatre, where she, like many theatre personalities of her generation, started their professional careers.

=== Translations ===
Tal Itzhaki has translated numerous plays into the Hebrew, among them María Irene Fornés' The Conduct of Life, Sarah Daniels Neaptide, Jonathan Harvey's Beautiful Thing, David Hare's Secret Rapture, Caryl Churchill's Cloud Nine and Seven Jewish Girls, Arnold Wesker's Shylock, Bernard Slade's Same Time Next Year, Anne Devlin's Ourselves Alone, Nick Dear's The Art of Success, and many others. She has translated Winston Churchill's collection Never Give In.

== Awards and Citations ==
Tal Itzhaki has designed sets, costume, puppets and masks for over 250 shows in theatres, dance companies, and theatre schools in Israel and abroad. Her work won several awards and citations.

Her design for "Woman from the Earth" at the Acco Festival of Alternative Israeli Theatre, 1981, won her the First Prize for design. "The fair, celestial set of Tali Itzhaki, with sown angels, and silhouettes of Cherubim and Seraphim placed on stage, is wonderful", wrote critic Giora Manor at the daily "Al Hamishmar"; and Amir Orian writes in the weekly "Ha'ir":"The set of Tali Itzhaki is simple and serves well the basic approach of the production. Yet it is also impressive in its beauty in the combined placement of the various figures of Lilith in shades of red against a white background."

On her design for "The Pledge of Troth" at the Acco Festival of Alternative Israeli Theatre and The Library Theatre, Maariv (newspaper) reviewer Sarit Fuchs has written: " "The Pledge of Troth"... turned, owing to a beautiful classical stage fermentation, into a sensual experience, a dream experience... The sea of Jaffa – one of the central symbols of the story – the symbol of sub conscience, passion, lunacy, was created by designer Tali Itzhaki as a beautiful backdrop, serving as a reflection of the mental world of the characters, who are gradually engulfed and imprisoned by their madness. The sea, like the entire stage, moves between a shining Israeli light of consciousness, and a Norwegian or Swedish darkening, of a sub conscience remindful of Ibsen, Bergman, or Edvard Munch"

And on the production of Inherit the Wind, which she designed for the Haifa Theatre, theatre critic Elyakim Yaron wrote in the same paper: "It is impossible to imagine Gazit's direction of the play, especially in those parts in which a huge theatrical and spectacular momentum is required, without his fertile cooperation with his stage designer, Tali Itzhaki. Her impressive stage design indeed enables a show of such theatrical extension. Her design managed to successfully create a magnificent integration of that atmosphere of distinct American background, and a clear conception of a huge and impressive space. The aesthetic neatness of the set, which wonderfully combines the brown wooden colors with the classical white structure of columns and banisters, is a delight for the eye. And indeed the director uses this framework well, when he sits on the upper balconies the town's citizens attending the trial. And this excellent stage picture is yet complemented by the beautiful costumes."

== Gallery ==
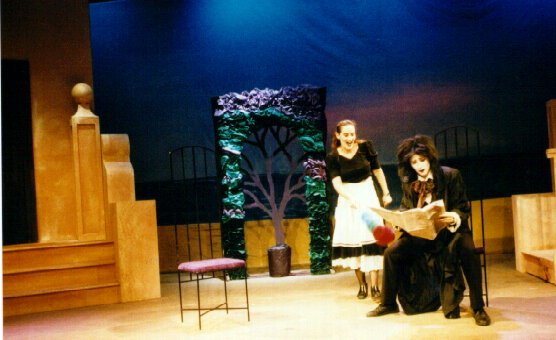
Twelfth Night (Haifa University Theatre, 1998)

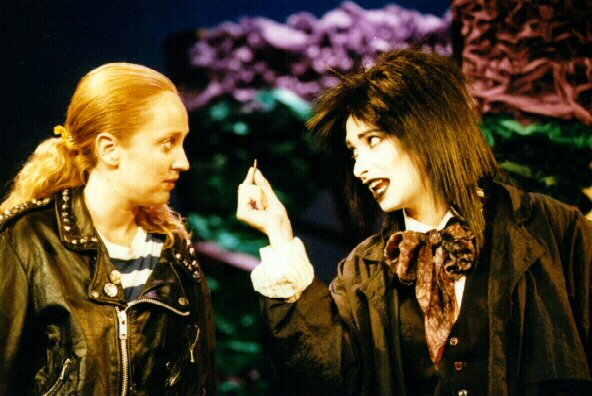
Twelfth Night (Haifa University Theatre, 1998)

== Selected works for the theatre: set, costume, puppets and masks ==
Selected works designed (to open table press the "show" button)
Year	Production	Author	Adaptation/Translation	Director	Set	Costume	Puppets/Masks	Lighting	Theatre
1980	No Pardon, No Thanks, No Welcome	Yitzhak Laor		Yitzhak Laor	Tal Itzhaki	Tal Itzhaki		Judy Kupferman	Kibbutzim College of Education
1981	"Men in the Sun"	Ghassan Kanafani	Fuad Awad	Fuad Awad	Tal Itzhaki	Tal Itzhaki		Dorit Malin	Tel Aviv University
1981	Woman from the Earth	Yael Feiler	from Jewish sources	Etti Resnik	Tal Itzhaki	Tal Itzhaki		Dorit Malin	Acco Festival of Alternative Israeli Theatre, Neve Tzedek Theatre
1982	Curse of the Starving Class	Sam Shepard	Esther Izbitsky	Esther Izbitsky	Tal Itzhaki	Tal Itzhaki			Beit Zvi
1982	The Lost Princess	Shimon Levy	after Nachman of Breslav	Shimon Levy	Tal Itzhaki	Tal Itzhaki	Tal Itzhaki		Tel Aviv University
1982	Zbenk and Finish	San Francisco Mime Troupe		Sinai Peter	Tal Itzhaki	Tal Itzhaki			Neve Tzedek Theatre
1982	Kennedy's Children	Robert Patrick		Etti Resnik	Tal Itzhaki	Tal Itzhaki			Beit Zvi
1983	The Trip to the Island Ulay	after Miriam Yalan-Stekelis		Bilhah Mass	Tal Itzhaki	Tal Itzhaki			Yuval Theatre
1983	Dusa, Fish, Vy and Stas	Pam Gems		Etti Resnik	Tal Itzhaki	Tal Itzhaki			Kibbutzim College of Education
1983	Circles	Ophelia Strall		David Braslavi	Tal Itzhaki	Tal Itzhaki			Tel Aviv University
1983	Courtship and Marriage	Dennis Silk		Fa Tsu	Tal Itzhaki	Tal Itzhaki			Objects Theatre, Israel Museum
1984	The Parliament of Women	after Aristophanes' Ecclesiazusae	Nisim Aloni	Etti Resnik	Tal Itzhaki	Tal Itzhaki			The Kibbutz Stage
1984	Pledge of Troth	Yoram Falk	after Shmuel Yosef Agnon	Yoram Falk	Tal Itzhaki	Tal Itzhaki		Judy Kupferman	The Library Theatre, Acco Festival of Alternative Israeli Theatre
1984	Six Characters in Search of an Author	Luigi Pirandello		Rina Yerushalmi	Moshe Sternfeld	Tal Itzhaki			Kibbutzim College of Education
1985	The Island on Birds Street	Uri Orlev		Benjamin Tsemach	Moshe Sternfeld	Tal Itzhaki			Orna Porat Children's Theater
1985	Coffee Please	Nava Zuckerman		Nava Zuckerman	Tal Itzhaki	Tal Itzhaki	Tal Itzhaki	Judy Kupferman	Tmu-na Theatre
1985	Selling Only	Joan Holden	Hagit Rekhavi	Dan Chumley/Israel Gurion	Tal Itzhaki	Tal Itzhaki		Judy Kupferman	Neve Tzedek Theatre
1985	Temporary Separation	Hillel Mittelpunkt		Hillel Mittelpunkt	Eytan Levy	Tal Itzhaki			Habima Theatre
1985	Cecilia, Christina, Cornelia and All the Rest	Daniella Michaeli	after Yona Wallach's poetry	Daniella Michaeli	Tal Itzhaki	Tal Itzhaki		Netta Gelfman	Acco Festival of Alternative Israeli Theatre
1985	Oedisinbad	Xenia Claviropolus	Ada Ben-Nahum	Etti Resnik	Tal Itzhaki	Tal Itzhaki	Tal Itzhaki	Judy Kupferman	Orna Porat Children's Theater
1986	Rosmersholm	Henrik Ibsen	David Maayan	Etti Resnik	Tal Itzhaki	Tal Itzhaki			Beit Zvi
1986	Mench Meier	Franz Xaver Kroetz	Gad Kaynar	Yoram Falk	Tal Itzhaki	Tal Itzhaki			The Library Theatre
1986	From Fly to Elephant	after Ayin Hillel	Tal Omer	Tal Omer	Tal Itzhaki	Tal Itzhaki			Tikki Productions
1986	Uga, Uga, Uga	Roni Pisker		Roni Pisker	Tal Itzhaki	Tal Itzhaki	Tal Itzhaki		Matan – Beit Lessin Theater
1986	The Blast in Ahalan Street	Daniella Carmi		Hagit Rekhavi	Tal Itzhaki	Tal Itzhaki			Orna Porat Children's Theater
1986	Train in Bavaria	Malka Merin	after Esther Fuchs	Malka Merin	Tal Itzhaki	Tal Itzhaki			Acco Festival of Alternative Israeli Theatre
1986	My Husband Shakespeare	Simkha Spector		Simkha Spector	Tal Itzhaki	Tal Itzhaki			Alternativa Group
1987	Tully's Follies	Lanford Wilson		Michael Downes	Tal Itzhaki	Tal Itzhaki			The Library Theatre
1987	Blood Wedding	Federico Garcia Lorca		Irit Halperin and Hani Abu-Hamed	Tal Itzhaki	Tal Itzhaki			Tayibe Community Theatre
1987	Step on a Crack	Susan Zeder		Etti Resnik	Tal Itzhaki	Tal Itzhaki			Orna Porat Children's Theater
1988	Top Girls	Caryl Churchill	Rivka Meshulach	Etti Resnik	Tal Itzhaki	Tal Itzhaki			Beit Zvi
1988	Benito	Michael Kahana		Michael Kahana	Tal Itzhaki	Tal Itzhaki			Matan - Habima Theatre
1988	Vineyards Singing Company	Yair Klinger		Dani Lita'i	Tal Itzhaki				Vineyards Singing Company
1988	Day of Independence Show, Rishon LeZion	Musical Director: Yair Klinger		Dani Lita'i	Tal Itzhaki				Rishon LeZion
1988	Kiryat Malachi Youth Singing Company			Zvia Huberman	Tal Itzhaki	Tal Itzhaki			Kiryat Malachi Youth Singing Company
1988	Between Water and Water	Yoram Falk	after Yosef Haim Brenner	Yoram Falk	Tal Itzhaki	Tal Itzhaki			Beit Zvi
1988	Rat in the Skull	Ron Hutchinson		Dorit Yerushalmi	Tal Itzhaki	Tal Itzhaki			The Library Theatre
1988	Independence Night of Mr Israel Sheffi	Avraham Raz		Frida Rafael	Tal Itzhaki	Tal Itzhaki		Judy Kupferman	Acco Festival of Alternative Israeli Theatre, Beersheba Theater
1988	The Hands of Galathea	Michael Shancel		Dorit Yerushalmi	Tal Itzhaki	Tal Itzhaki			The Library Theatre
1988	A Cat on a Hot Tin Roof	Tennessee Williams		Nicole Kassel	Tal Itzhaki	Tal Itzhaki			Beit Zvi
1988	Balerina	Arna Scoan		Etti Resnik	Tal Itzhaki	Tal Itzhaki			Beit Zvi
1988	Wild Child	Tammi Zar		Daniella Michaeli	Tal Itzhaki	Tal Itzhaki			Orna Porat Children's Theater
1989	Rashomon	Fay Kanin and Michael Kanin		Etti Resnik	Tal Itzhaki	Tal Itzhaki			Beit Zvi
1989	Inherit the Wind	Jerome Lawrence and Robert E. Lee	Avraham Oz	Amit Gazit	Tal Itzhaki	Tal Itzhaki		Yehiel Orgal	Haifa Theatre
1989	Ephraim Goes Back to the Army	Yitzhak Laor		Etti Resnik	Tal Itzhaki	Tal Itzhaki		Judy Kupferman	Tzavta theater
1989	The Trip to the Island Ulay	after Miriam Yalan-Stekelis		Irit Vager	Tal Itzhaki	Tal Itzhaki			Sunflower Theatre
1989	Gallows Humor	Jack Richardson		Dorit Yerushalmi	Tal Itzhaki	Tal Itzhaki			The Library Theatre
1989	Come and Go	Yoni Lahav		Dorit Yerushalmi	Tal Itzhaki	Tal Itzhaki			Tikki Productions
1989	Rosmersholm	Henrik Ibsen	Miriam Kainy	Etti Resnik	Tal Itzhaki	Tal Itzhaki		Yechiel Orgal	Haifa Theatre
1989	You Can't Take It With You	George S. Kaufman and Moss Hart		Amit Gazit	Tal Itzhaki	Tal Itzhaki		Yechiel Orgal	Haifa Theatre
1989	Top Girls	Caryl Churchill	Rivka Meshulach	Etti Resnik	Tal Itzhaki	Tal Itzhaki			The Library Theatre
1990	Peace Child	Hannan Peled	Music by David Gordon	Yael Drouyannoff	Tal Itzhaki	Tal Itzhaki			Peace Child
1990	Monsieur de Pourceaugnac	Moliere	Nathan Alterman	Vardit Shalfy	Tal Itzhaki	Tal Itzhaki			Beit Zvi
1990	The Parliament of Women	after Aristophanes' Ecclesiazusae	Nisim Aloni	Frida Rafael	Tal Itzhaki	Tal Itzhaki		Judy Kupferman	Acco Festival of Alternative Israeli Theatre
1990	Neaptide	Sarah Daniels	Tal Itzhaki	Etti Resnik	Tal Itzhaki			Judy Kupferman	Beit Zvi
1991	Chicken Soup	Yair Tribelski	Orly Wasserzug	Tal Itzhaki				Hassimta Theatre	
1991	When the Omelette Touches the Salad	Michael Morris-Reich		Rivi Feldmesser-Yaron	Tal Itzhaki	Tal Itzhaki			Acco Festival of Alternative Israeli Theatre
1992	The Magic Sandal	after Metveiev	Miki Mevorach	Neta Oren	Tal Itzhaki	Tal Itzhaki	Tal Itzhaki		The Shadows Theatre
1992	Duet (This Property is Condemned and Moony's Kid Don't Cry)	Tennessee Williams		Vered Gilboa	Tal Itzhaki	Tal Itzhaki			Thelma Yellin High School of the Arts
1992	Abeer	Hagit Yaari		Hagit Yaari	Tal Itzhaki	Tal Itzhaki		Judy Kupferman	Acco Festival of Alternative Israeli Theatre
1994	The Tempest	William Shakspeare	Orly Gross and Eugene Nacht	Eugene Nacht	Tal Itzhaki	Tal Itzhaki	Tal Itzhaki		Haifa Festival of Children Theatre
1994	Boy's Life	Howard Korder	Yoav Katz	Arthur Kogan	Tal Itzhaki	Tal Itzhaki			Beit Zvi
1994	Fen	Caryl Churchill		Ohad Shahar	Tal Itzhaki	Tal Itzhaki			Beit Zvi
1995	Man is Man	Bertolt Brecht	Amnon Achi-Naomi	David Bergman	Tal Itzhaki	Tal Itzhaki			Beit Zvi
1995	Montserrat	Emanuel Robles	Lillian Helman/Doron Tavori	Vardit Shalfy	Tal Itzhaki	Tal Itzhaki		Yechiel Orgal	Haifa Theatre
1995	Families: Sisters Donahue and The Parkers	Geraldine Aron	Tal Itzhaki	Hanna Maron	Tal Itzhaki	Tal Itzhaki			Beit Zvi
1995	Beautiful Thing	Jonathan Harvey	Tal Itzhaki	Yoram Falk	Tal Itzhaki	Tal Itzhaki			Beit Zvi
1995	Getting Out	Marsha Norman		Noia Lancet	Tal Itzhaki	Tal Itzhaki			Beit Zvi
1995	Erica's Orchard	Erica Knoller		Amnon Rothstein	Tal Itzhaki	Tal Itzhaki			Teatronetto Festival, Haifa Theatre
1995	Key Girl	Shlomit Trigger-Haguel	Hagit Rekhavi-Nicolayevski	Hagit Rekhavi-Nicolayevski	Tal Itzhaki	Tal Itzhaki			Hanni Productions
1995	Company (musical)	George Furth and Stephen Sondheim	Lyrics and music: Stephen Sondheim	Meir Vardi	Tal Itzhaki				Beit Zvi
1995	The Workshop	Jean-Claude Grumberg		Etti Resnik	Tal Itzhaki	Tal Itzhaki			Beit Zvi
1995	Ghost Song	Alona Kimhi		Alona Kimhi	Tal Itzhaki	Tal Itzhaki			Tzavta Theatre
1996	Antigone	Sophocles	Aharon Shabtai	Vardit Shalfy	Tal Itzhaki	Tal Itzhaki		Yechiel Orgal	Haifa Theatre
1996	Eskesta - Courtship	Ruth Eshell		Choreography Ruth Eshell		Tal Itzhaki			Eskesta Ethiopian Dance Theatre
1997	Voyages	Shulamit Lapid		Amit Gazit	Tal Itzhaki	Tal Itzhaki			Cameri Theater
1997	Roots	Miriam Kayni		Miriam Kayni	Tal Itzhaki	Tal Itzhaki			Festival of Short Plays, Tzavta Theatre
1997	Ma Ni Ma Mima	Joshua Sobol		Ilan Toren	Tal Itzhaki	Tal Itzhaki			Festival of Short Plays, Tzavta Theatre
1997	Qat'r-al-Nada	Samih al-Qasim		Nabeel Azar	Tal Itzhaki	Tal Itzhaki			Yoad Theatre, Kafr Rami
1997	The Crucible	Arthur Miller		Ilan Toren	Tal Itzhaki	Tal Itzhaki			Haifa University Theatre
1997	Terminal One, Dance	Tamir Gens		Choreography Tamir Gens		Tal Itzhaki			Bat-Dor Dance Company
1997	Eskesta – "Memories from the Village"	Ruth Eshell		Choreography Ruth Eshell		Tal Itzhaki		Yechiel Orgal	Eskesta, Ethiopian Dance Company
1998	Ouri Bat 50 (Ouri 50 Years Old),	Compiled by Er'ella Brown		Sinai Peter	Tal Itzhaki	Tal Itzhaki		Yechiel Orgal	Haifa University Theatre
1998	Extasy, Dance	Berta Yampolsky		Choreography Berta Yampolsky	Tal Itzhaki	Berta Yampolsky			Israel Ballet
1998	And Alone We stayed	Miriam Kayni		Amit Gazit	Tal Itzhaki	Tal Itzhaki			Haifa Festival of Children Theatre
1998	Another Day	Songs by Rachel Shapira		Moshe Tené	Tal Itzhaki	Tal Itzhaki			Tzavta Theatre
1998	Twelfth Night	William Shakespeare	Ehud Manor	Amit Gazit	Tal Itzhaki	Tal Itzhaki		Yechiel Orgal	Haifa University Theatre
1998	Leah's Boots	after the poems of Leah Goldberg	Hagit Rekhavi-Nikolaevski	Hagit Rekhavi-Nikolaevski	Tal Itzhaki	Tal Itzhaki			Orna Porat children's Theater
1999	Telemachus Clay	Lewis John Carlino	Tirtza Atar	Etti Resnik	Tal Itzhaki	Tal Itzhaki			Beit Zvi
1999	Epikorus, dance	Tamir Gens		Choreography Tamir Gens	Tal Itzhaki	Tal Itzhaki			Bat-Dor Dance Company
1999	Medea, dance	Berta Yampolsky		Choreography Berta Yampolsky	Tal Itzhaki		Tal Itzhaki		Israel Ballet
1999	A Midsummer Night's Dream	William Shakespeare	T. Carmi	Amit Gazit	Tal Itzhaki	Tal Itzhaki			Haifa University Theatre, Open air Theatre at the Carmel forest
2000	The Conduct of Life	Maria Irene Fornes	Tal Itzhaki	Amit Gazit	Tal Itzhaki	Tal Itzhaki			Haifa University Theatre
2000	Fear and Sorrow in the BRD	Franz Xaver Kroetz		Ilan Toren	Tal Itzhaki	Tal Itzhaki			Haifa University Theatre
2000	Bag without Violence	Tamir Gens		Choreography Tamir Gens	Tal Itzhaki				Bat-Dor Dance Company
2000	The House of Bernarda Alba	Federico Garcia Lorca		Muneer Bakri	Tal Itzhaki	Tal Itzhaki			Al Midan Theatre
2000	The Silver Tassie	Seán O'Casey		Etti Resnik	Tal Itzhaki	Tal Itzhaki			Beit Zvi
2001	Men in the Sun	Ghassan Kanafani		Muneer Bakri	Tal Itzhaki	Tal Itzhaki			Kibbutzim College of Education
2001	Trojan Women	Euripides		Amit Gazit	Tal Itzhaki	Tal Itzhaki			Haifa University Theatre
2001	A Bird Enrapt by Magic	A Tribute to the poems of Zelda (poet)		Ora Zitner	Tal Itzhaki				Tzavta Theatre
2001	Emile Habibi – I Stayed in Haifa	A Tribute to Emile Habibi	compiled by Siham Daoud	Siham Daoud	Tal Itzhaki				Rappoport Auditorium, Haifa
2001	The Female Odd Couple	Neil Simon		Amit Gazit	Tal Itzhaki	Tal Itzhaki			Haifa University Theatre
2002	Everybody Wants to Live	Hanoch Levin		Amit Gazit	Tal Itzhaki	Tal Itzhaki			Haifa University Theatre
2002	Men in the Sun (Arab version)	Ghassan Kanafani		Muneer Bakri	Tal Itzhaki	Tal Itzhaki			Haifa University Theatre
2002	Letters to My Brother	Yaki Mehraz		Yaki Mehraz	Tal Itzhaki	Tal Itzhaki			Nava Productions
2003	Neaptide	Sarah Daniels	Tal Itzhaki	Amit Gazit	Tal Itzhaki	Tal Itzhaki			Haifa University Theatre
2003	Cloud Nine	Caryl Churchill	Tal Itzhaki	Amit Gazit	Tal Itzhaki	Tal Itzhaki			Haifa University Theatre
2003	Tough Love	Motti Lerner		Amit Gazit	Tal Itzhaki	Tal Itzhaki		Yechiel Orgal	Haifa Theatre
2003	Luggage Packers (English version)	Hanoch Levin	Michael Alfreds	Amit Gazit	Tal Itzhaki	Tal Itzhaki			The Minor Latham Playhouse, Barnard College, Columbia University, New York
2003	Telemachus Clay	Lewis John Carlino	Tirza Atar	Etti Resnik	Tal Itzhaki	Tal Itzhaki		Amir Brenner	Akko Festival, Library Theatre
2004	Luggage Packers (Hebrew version)	Hanoch Levin		Amit Gazit	Tal Itzhaki	Tal Itzhaki		Yechiel Orgal	Haifa University Theatre
2004	Luggage Packers (Arab version)	Hanoch Levin	Ala Hlehel	Amit Gazit	Tal Itzhaki	Tal Itzhaki		Yechiel Orgal	Haifa University Theatre
2004	Neighbors	after Hanoch Levin	Tal Itzhaki and Amit Gazit	Amit Gazit	Tal Itzhaki	Tal Itzhaki			The Minor Latham Playhouse, Barnard College, Columbia University, New York
2005	The Frog Prince, a dance	Tamir Gens		Choreography Tamir Gens	Tal Itzhaki	Tal Itzhaki			Bat-Dor Dance Company, Camea Group
2005	Xandra compelled to speak	Tal Itzhaki and Amit Gazit	after Euripides/Jean-Paul Sartre, William Shakespeare, Jean Giraudoux, Christa Wolf, Mahmud Darwish, Arundhati Roy, Hanoch Levin, Bertolt Brecht, Aaron Sorkin et al.	Amit Gazit	Tal Itzhaki	Tal Itzhaki			The Minor Latham Playhouse, Barnard College, Columbia University, New York
2006	Clouds on A Mountain Way	Orna Akad		Orna Akad	Tal Itzhaki	Tal Itzhaki			Al Midan Theatre
2007	The Lion and the Jewel	Wole Soyinka	Yaffa Shuster	Yaffa Shuster	Tal Itzhaki	Tal Itzhaki		Judy Kupferman	Natela Theatre
2008	Ibn Khaldun	Hisham Suliman		Hisham Suliman	Tal Itzhaki	Tal Itzhaki			Nazareth Fringe Theatre
2008	Gonny in the Kingdom of the Garbage Creatures	Rimona Lapin		Rimona Lapin	Tal Itzhaki	Tal Itzhaki			Tel Aviv University
2008	Him That Pisses Against the Wall	Hama Tuma	Yaffa Shuster	Yaffa Shuster	Tal Itzhaki	Tal Itzhaki			The Interdisciplinary Arena, Jerusalem
2009	Jump	Ayelet Moskowits-Weiss		Shimon Levy	Tal Itzhaki	Tal Itzhaki			Tmu-na Theatre
2009	Herzl Said	Iyad Barguthi		Mouneer Bakri	Tal Itzhaki	Tal Itzhaki			Al Lajun Theatre, Masrahid Festival
2010	Sun, Don't Go Away	Ayman Agbaria		Mouneer Bakri	Tal Itzhaki	Tal Itzhaki		Ya'acov Sliv	Nazareth Fringe Theatre
2010	The Island	Athol Fugard		Mouneer Bakri	Tal Itzhaki	Tal Itzhaki			Al Midan Theatre
2011	Servant of Two Masters	Carlo Goldoni		Mouneer Bakri	Tal Itzhaki	Tal Itzhaki		Firas Ruby	Al Midan Theatre
2011	How Much Sea in the Sea	Ayin Hillel	Tal Omer	Tal Omer	Tal Itzhaki	Tal Itzhaki	Tal Itzhaki		Children Theatre
2011	Split Screen	After Dahlia Ravikovitch and Naguib Mahfouz	Tal Omer and Mouneer Bakri	Tal Omer and Mouneer Bakri	Tal Itzhaki	Tal Itzhaki			Academy of Performing Arts, Tel Aviv Theatre
2011	Home	Riad Masarwa		Mouneer Bakri	Tal Itzhaki	Tal Itzhaki			Al Midan Theatre
2012	The House of Bernarda Alba	Federico Garcia Lorca	Rivka Meshulach	Mouneer Bakri	Tal Itzhaki	Tal Itzhaki		Ya'acov Sliv	Academy of Performing Arts, Tel Aviv Theatre
2012	The Crucible	Arthur Miller	Ehud Manor	Amit Gazit	Tal Itzhaki	Tal Itzhaki		Judy Kupferman	Academy of Performing Arts, Tel Aviv Theatre
2013	Ashes to Ashes/Mountain Language	Harold Pinter	Avraham Oz	Avraham Oz	Tal Itzhaki	Tal Itzhaki		Judy Kupferman	Academy of Performing Arts, Tel Aviv Theatre
2013	Krum	Hanoch Levin		Amit Gazit	Tal Itzhaki	Tal Itzhaki		Judy Kupferman	Academy of Performing Arts, Tel Aviv Theatre
2013	The Legendary Inikpi	Emmy Idegu	Lihi-Barzel-Melamed	Yaffa Shuster	Tal Itzhaki	Tal Itzhaki		Judy Kupferman	the African-Israeli Stage
2014	Neaptide	Sarah Daniels	Tal Itzhaki	Amit Gazit	Tal Itzhaki	Tal Itzhaki		Judy Kupferman	Academy of Performing Arts, Tel Aviv Theatre
2014	Good	C. P. Taylor	Avraham Oz	Avraham Oz	Tal Itzhaki	Tal Itzhaki		Yechiel Orgal	Academy of Performing Arts, Tel Aviv Theatre
2015	Arlecchino	Leon Katz	Nisim Aloni	Ofira Laniado	Tal Itzhaki	Tal Itzhaki and Noa Dotan	Tal Itzhaki and Noa Dotan	Judy Kupferman	Academy of Performing Arts, Tel Aviv THeatre
2015	The Effect of Gamma Rays on Man-in-the-Moon Marigolds	Paul Zindel	Yaakov Shabtai	Dor Peles	Tal Itzhaki	Tal Itzhaki		Judy Kupferman	Academy of Performing Arts, Tel Aviv Theatre
2015	Women Talk Women	Doreet Peled-Harpaz		Doreet Peled-Harpaz	Tal Itzhaki	Tal Itzhaki		Nizar Khamra	Academy of Performing Arts, Tel Aviv Theatre
2015	Heffetz	Hanoch Levin		Shalom Shmuelov	Tal Itzhaki	Tal Itzhaki		Uri Rubinstein	Academy of Performing Arts, Tel Aviv Theatre
2015	Woyzeck	Georg Büchner	Yedidya Itzhaki, Dan Miron	David Braslavi	David Braslavi	Tal Itzhaki		Judy Kupferman	Academy of Performing Arts, Tel Aviv Theatre
2016	The Merchant of Venice	William Shakespeare	Avraham Oz	Avraham Oz	Tal Itzhaki	Timoteo Corelli		Nizar Khamra	Alfa Theatre, Tel Aviv
2017	Back River	Rachel Shalita		Eliran Caspi	Tal Itzhaki	Tal Itzhaki		Eliran Caspi	Teatronetto Festival, Academy of Performing Arts, Tel Aviv Theatre
2017	The Violin	Gili and Nimrod Shanit		Gili and Nimrod Shanit	Sharon Keren	Tal Itzhaki			Tmu-na Theatre
2017	Yevke	Mulo Gojem Entenach		Fruit Parada	Tal Itzhaki				Tazata Theatre
2017	The Boys Next Door	Tom Griffin	Gadi Inbar	Dor Peles	Tal Itzhaki	Tal Itzhaki		Nizar Khamra	Alfa Theatre, Tel Aviv Theatre
2019	Landscape	Harold Pinter	Avraha Oz	Avraham Oz	Tal Itzhaki	Tal Itzhaki		Nizar Khamra	The Academy of Performing Arts, Tel Aviv Theatre

== Select publications ==
- Tal Itzhaki, Beyond Concrete, American Theatre 2008.
- Tal Itzhaki,Ways of Unseeing: Glass Walls on the Main Stage, in: Susan Haedicke, Dee Heddon, A. Oz, E J Westlake (eds.), Political Performances: Theory and Practice, New York & Amsterdam, 2009.
- Tal Itzhaki, Theatre and Travel, Teatron 2010.(Hebrew)
- Tal Itzhaki Notes Concerning the PQ Changes, in: Sodja Lotker (ed.), Transformations of Prague Quadrennial from 1999 to 2015, Prague, 2017
