= Yuval Stonis =

Israeli actor (1983–2021)

- יובל סטוניס
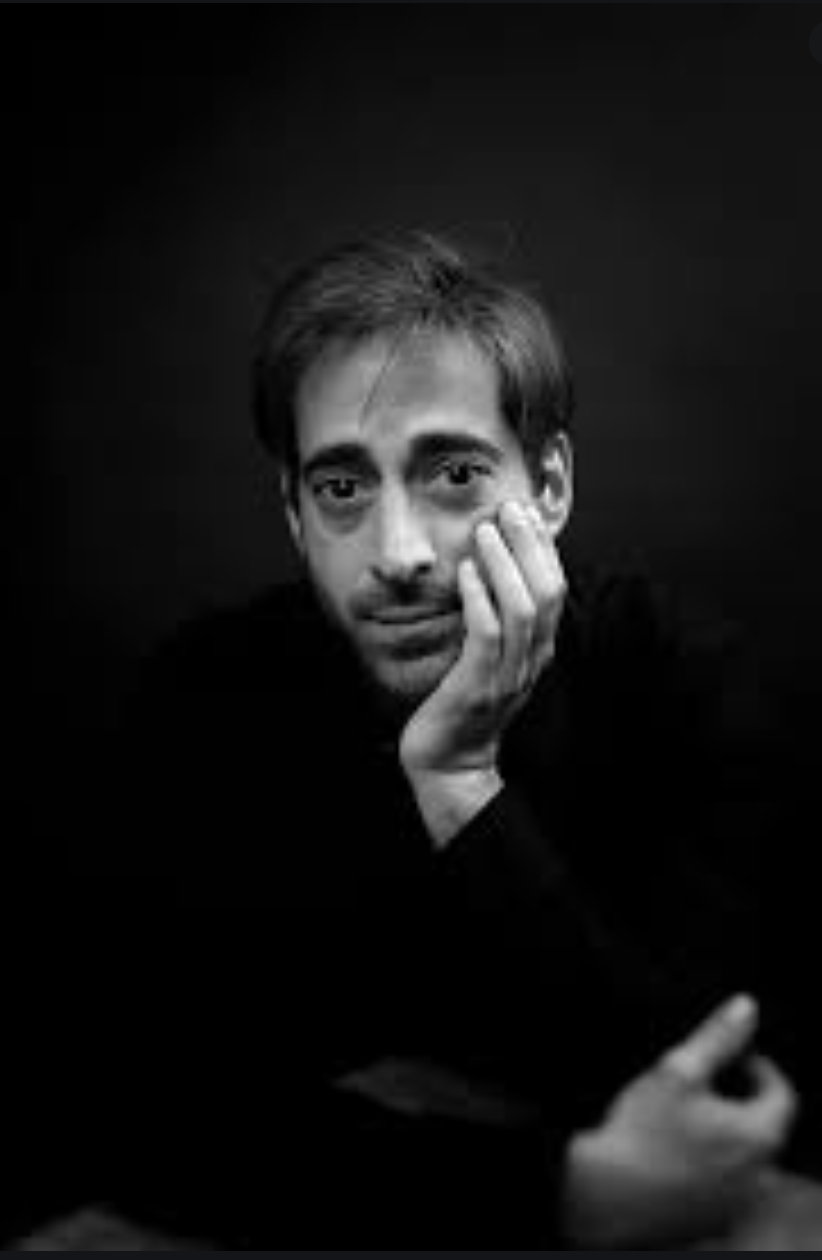
- Born: 2 May 1983; Tel Aviv, Israel
- Died: 12 January 2021 (aged 37); Tel Aviv, Israel
- Other names: Yuval Stunis
- Occupations: Actor; film director; comedian; screenwriter
- Years active: 2007–2021

Yuval Stonis (Hebrew: יובל סטוניס; 2 May 1983 – 12 January 2021) was an Israeli actor, film director, comedian and screenwriter. He was best known for his role in the television series Hamovilim.

== Biography ==
Yuval Stonis was born on 2 May 1983, in Tel Aviv. Stonis received his education at the Nissan Nativ acting studio. After finishing polytechnic school, Stonis became an actor at the Gesher Theater in Tel Aviv-Yafo.

In the following years, Stonis played main characters in theaters such as the Kibbutz Theater and the Orna Porat Children's Theater. He went on to perform in many plays, including The Magician's Apprentice (show theater), Romeo and Juliet (Tmu-na Theater) and Noah's Ark (Orna Porat Children's Theater). Between 2007 and 2009, Stonis played older brother Tomer Degani in the popular Israeli sitcom Hamovilim. Tomer was one of the three main characters alongside those played by Ben Perry and Liat Har Lev. Stonis was supposed to continue playing Tomer in the fourth season of the series, but the show was cancelled due to the death of Kalim Kamenko, one of the main actors. He continued to act for several years in small roles and guest roles on the Arutz HaYeladim channel, taking roles such as Oded Raz in the series Galis and Yaron Arazi in the series The Foxes (first season).

In 2010, Stonis directed and starred in the short film The Man Who Could Not Laugh in collaboration with the film department of Thelma Yellin High School. The film was uploaded to both YouTube and screened at the Young Film Festival in Haifa. In 2011, he played the antagonist in the psychological film Reality 01, one of only two characters in the film. The film tells the story of a police officer (played by Ben Sela) chasing an elusive criminal. During the chase, the policeman loses his grip on reality. In late 2011, Stonis starred in the play Freedom to Move written by Gideona Raz. He was awarded the Actor of the Year award by The Short Theater Festival for his performance. (He)

In 2018, Stonis won the Best Leading Actor award at the Acre Festival for his role in the play, Dragons and Whores.

In 2020 he played the character of Koby in the series Underdogs, which was aired under D.B.S. Satellite Services (1998) Ltd.

== Death ==
Stonis died on 12 January 2021, in Tel Aviv from stomach cancer at the age of 37. He announced that he had the disease the previous May.
