= Academy of Performing Arts, Tel Aviv =

Theatre and performance school in Tel Aviv, Israel

- Type: Drama school and Theatre
- Established: 2010
- Director: Tal Itzhaki
- Location: Tel Aviv, Israel; 32°03′56″N 34°47′21″E
- Website: performingart.co.il
- Location in Israel

The Academy of Performing Arts is a theatre centre and a school of theatre and performance, operating since 2010 in Tel Aviv, in collaboration with the Open University of Israel.

== Faculty ==
The Academy of Performing Arts was established in 2010 in Tel Aviv by a group of theatre practitioners, among them Professor Avraham Oz; Professor Ahuva Belkin; actress Sandra Sadeh; directors and actors Moni Moshonov and Oded Kotler; director Amit Gazit; and theatre designer and translator Tal Itzhaki, who functions as the general director of the Academy since its establishment; Roni Pisker, actor, director and puppeteer, lighting designer Professor Ben-Tzion Munitz; and Dr Chen Alon, director of community theatre. This nucleus of founders was later joined by many other members of faculty, among them actress and film director Michal Bat-Adam; director and musician Shosh Reisman; international opera singer Gabi Sadeh; dancer and choreographer Ran Ben-Dror; directors and mime artists Gnady Babitsky and Ophira Laniado; director Mouneer Bakri; Street theatre and performance creators Avi Gibson-Barel and Yinon Zafrir; playwrights Ala Hlehel, Dr Michael Morris-Reich and Gour Koren; Film directors Yankul Goldwasser and Kehat Finkel; directors and actors Amnon Meskin, Sharon Alexander, Mohammad Bakri, Shalom Shmuelov, Dor Peles, Gita Munte and Tahel Ran; actresses Keren Tsur and Ahuva Keren. Actor and director Juliano Mer-Khamis, the founder of the Freedom Theatre at the Jenin refugee camp, was a member of faculty until his assassination on April 4, 2011. The Academy Theatre commemorates him by the "Annual Juliano Mer-Khamis Production."

== Program of studies ==
The Academy's curriculum is not unified and does not operate according to built-in program. Each student selects her/his personal curriculum, consulted by the faculty, reflecting one's proclivities and abilities. The Academy's program is varied in acting and performance methods and styles, attempting to expose the students to a large variety of approaches to theatre and film performance and become, as much as possible, a multi-styled creators and performers. Thus, many of the Academy's classes aim both as training workshops as well as performance targeted, leading to a final project finally performed in front of internal or external audience. In addition to the regular curriculum, the Academy operates the Academy Theatre which regularly mounts productions of professional standards, involving professional actors, some of whom are the Academy graduates and others graduates of other schools. The Academy also holds public discussions and lectures on cultural and artistic matters, and the Academy bar hosts musical programs and small-scale shows. Assembled from donations from various sources, the Academy has one of the largest theatre and culture libraries in Tel Aviv, and in 2015 the Gideon Tamir reading corner was inaugurated, for the use of students, faculty and the general public.

== Academic degree ==
The Academy of Performing Arts, Tel Aviv is not recognized as a higher education institution conferring degrees, yet it collaborates with the Israeli Open University of which it is an official study centre (no. 698). Each semester, according to demand, several classes of the Open University are given, tutored by the faculty of the Open University. Students who graduated from the Academy of Performing Arts, provided they have completed the full curriculum of the Academy, are entitled to apply for recognition of several credits from the studies towards a bachelor's degree. The recommended regular curriculum of each of the Academy's six semesters consists of at least 20 weekly hours of the Academy classes, plus optional 2 classes from the studies of the open University, all to be selected from the choice of classes offered that semester. In addition to the three years full program of studies, the Academy holds shorter programs designed to enable completion of studies for students who studied partial studies at other recognized schools of drama, while recognizing the classes studied in the former frameworks as parts of them full program. Also, the Academy holds on demand basic preparatory programs for students who would like to be admitted later for full programs of studies, whether in the Academy itself or elsewhere.

== Alpha 13 Festival ==
As of summer 2017, the Academy theatre has launched the Alpha 13 annual festival, to be held every year celebrating the end of the summer, including a prize competition of stage performances, house and guest productions, as well as music and film events. The 2017 festival consisted of 5 competition shows (selected by an artistic committee from about 30 applying groups and artists), 4 house productions, 7 guest shows and 4 special events of music and film. Most of these shows and events first opened in the festival, and others had their Tel Aviv debut during the four weeks of the festival. The festival major theme was "languages": a frivolous, festive and undisciplined variety of semantic languages (Hebrew, Arabic, Amharic and English), of performance styles, and of artistic genres.

== Theatre productions ==
Over the years the repertory of the Academy theatre consisted of a variety of shows, covering various areas of theatre and performance. Some of the most successful shows were Split Screen, a combined intertwined dramatization of short stories by Israeli poet Dalia Rabikowitz and Egyptian novelist Naguib Mahfouz; Commedia dell'Arte adaptations of Carlo Goldoni's Military Lover and Leon Katz' The Three Cuckolds; Krum(Excerpts) and Heffets by Hanoch Levin; Federico García Lorca's The House of Bernarda Alba(Excerpts); Arthur Miller's The Crucible(Excerpts); Sarah Daniels' Neaptide(Excerpts) Woyzeck by Büchner; The Effect of Gamma Rays on Man-in-the-Moon Marigolds by Paul Zindel, Jonathan Harvey's Beautiful Thing, and many others, as well as "playlects" ("play cum lecture"), such as Avraham Oz and his players performing and discussing love, courtship and marriage in Shakespeare (Oz and players in Shakespeare playlect). As of 2016, The productions division of the Academy has been established as a separate, professional fringe theatre and a hosting fringe centre by the name of Alfa Theatre, Tel Aviv. As such, it is recognized and supported by the Israeli Ministry of Culture and Sport, and the municipality of Tel Aviv. Among Alfa Theare's notable productions are Harold Pinter's Ashes to Ashes and Mountain Language(Excerpts); Good by C. P. Taylor (Who by Fire by Leonard Cohen, Hebrew lyrics by Avraham Oz, musical arrangement by Yuval Messner, from the production of Good at the Academy Theatre); Shakespeare's The Merchant of Venice (Jessica's departure, to the lyrics of Serge Reggiani's Ma fille); Pam Gems' Dusa, Fish, Vy, Stas (in Arabic); Back River by Rachel Shalita; Athol Fugard's Valley Song (in both Hebrew and Arabic versions); and Avraham Oz's Glorious Mountain. For an historical account of the Alfa Theatre, Tel Aviv, see, eg,"Alfa Theatre - the Biography of an Independent Theatre", Palestine-Israel Journal of Politics, Economics and Culture Vol 25, no 1&2,2020, pp.173–79.
