= Tsippi Fleischer =

Israeli composer

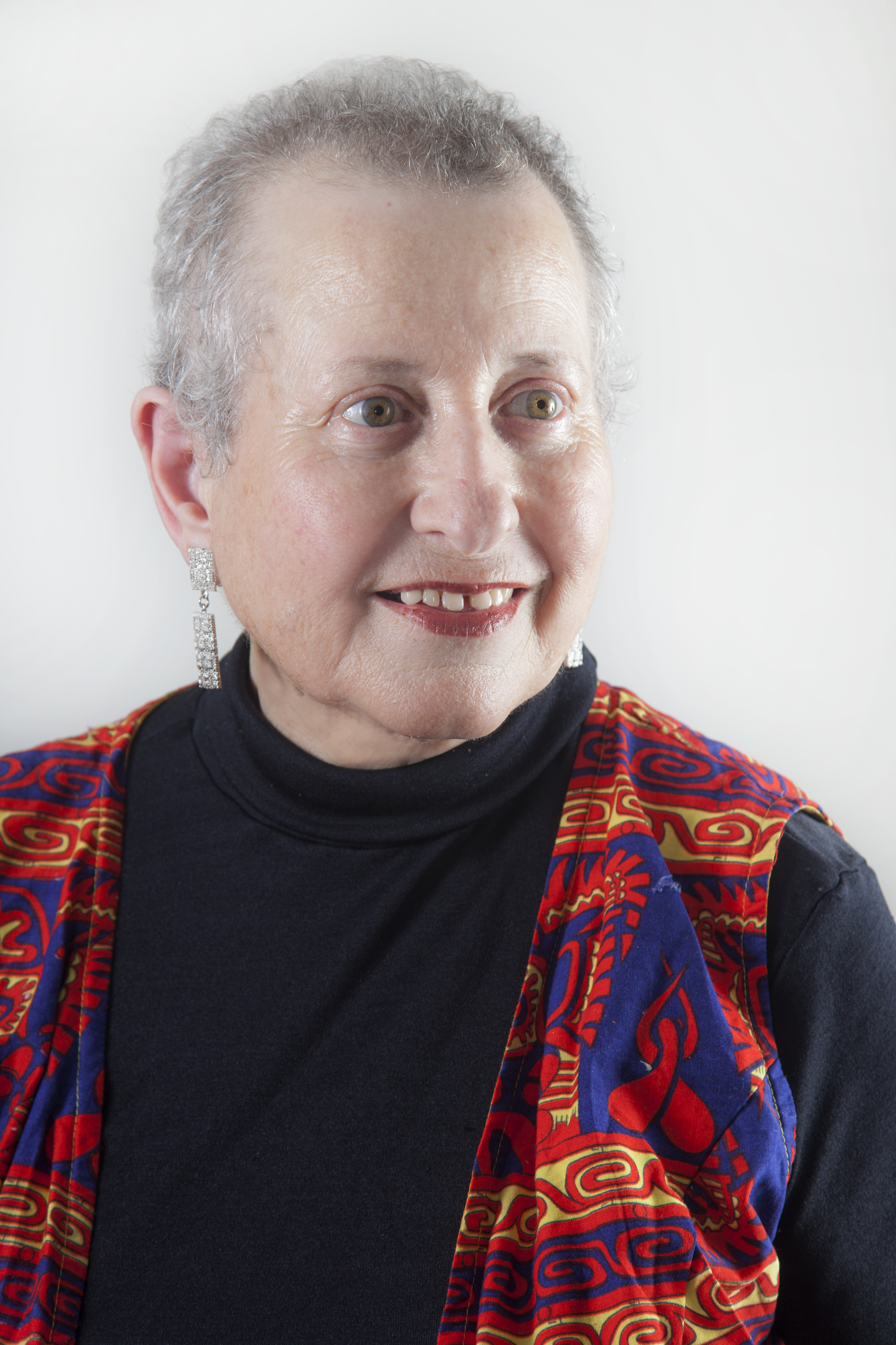
Tsippi Fleischer, 2015

Tsippi Fleischer (Hebrew: ציפי פליישר; born 20 May 1946) is an Israeli composer.

== Life ==
Tsippi Fleischer was born in Haifa, Israel, of Polish-born parents, and grew up in a mixed Jewish-Arab environment. She studied piano and theory at the Jerusalem Academy of Music and Dance and graduated from the Hebrew Reali School of Haifa, later pursuing degrees in music, Hebrew language, Middle Eastern history, and Arabic language and literature. In 1978, she married comparative linguist Aharon Dolgopolsky and had one son. She teaches at Bar-Ilan University and Levinsky Institute in Tel Aviv.

== As a composer ==
In the early 1970s, Fleischer became known for her activity in jazz, theater, and light music. She composed and arranged extensively in these genres, and already then, her activity had a prominent educational component, which was expressed, among other things, in her work with the Children's and Youth Theater under the direction of Orna Porat in Tel Aviv, and as arranger and conductor of the educational television series "Music in the Theater" hosted and musically directed by Gary Bertini. In 1970-1972, she founded and directed the light music band 'Banot Chava'; in 1973-1975, she was the music director of the Beersheba Theater (which was established at that time) and worked in close cooperation with the theater's resident director, Hanan Snir. As part of this activity she also composed the musical "On the Fiddle" (Op. 1), with lyrics by Ada Ben-Nachum based on a story by Sholem Aleichem.

Towards the end of the 1970s, Fleischer moved on to composing music for the concert stage. Since then, she has composed seven symphonies, four full-scale operas, chamber music, art songs, choral works (ranging from cappella pieces to oratorios and cantatas for choir and orchestra), and electronic works. Her creative thinking has undergone upheavals since the 1970s: back then, her pioneering style, influenced by her Middle Eastern studies, stood out in Israel. In the 1980s, her works led to the shaping and consolidation of this style. In the 1990s, her gaze deepened in time and place, incorporating elements from the Semitic world and beyond, including references to ancient cultures. The 2000s are characterized by her breaking into the broad genres of symphony and opera, which allowed her to expand her artistic expression.

== Honours and awards ==
- ACUM Prize for lifetime achievement
- Prime Minister's Prize on Israel's 50th anniversary
- Unesco-Paris (Rostrum) Prize for Composition
- Israel's Public Council for Culture and Art Prize for her Oratorio;
- Foremost Career-Woman of Israel for 1993 in the Field of Music awarded by Globes
- ACUM Prize for Like Two Branches
- Award from the government of Finland
- Award from the government of the United States
- Brahms-Preis (Germany)
- Canadian Electro-Acoustic Community award
- ACUM Honorary Fellowship (2017)

== Works ==
Fleischer's compositions unite Arabic and Jewish elements. Selected works include:

- Mein Volk (1995)
- Salt Crystals for symphony orchestra (1995)
- Oratorio (1492-1992) for symphonic orchestra, mixed chorus, and ensemble of guitars and mandolas, in memory of the expulsion of the Jews from Spain (1991)
- Like Two Branches, cantata in Arabic for chamber choir, two oboes, psaltery, cello, and tar drums (1989)
- The Gown of Night (1988) magnetic tape piece with the voices of Bedouin children
- In the Mountains of Armenia for Armenian girls, narrator, and clarinet on magnetic tape (1988)
- In Chromatic Mood (1986)
- The Clock Wants to Sleep for children's or women's chorus (1980)
- A Girl Named Limonad (1977)
- Musical after Shalom Aleichem (1975)
- Symphony No. 1 op. 33 (1995)
- Symphony No. 2 op. 48 (1998–2000)
- Symphony No. 3 op. 49 (2000)
- Symphony No. 4 op. 51 (2000)
- Symphony No. 5 op. 54 (2002–2004)

=== Discography ===
Tsippi Fleischer's music has been recorded and issued on CD. A comprehensive discography, including streaming and downloading of complete CDs in MP3 format, can be found on http://www.tsippi-fleischer.com/disco.html. CDs include:

- Around the World with Tsippi Fleischer
- Music from Six Continents, 1997 Series
- Music from Six Continents, 1991 Series
- Music from Six Continents, 1992 Series
- Music from Six Continents, 2000 Series
- Music from Six Continents, 2001 Series
- Tsippi Fleischer Symphonies I-V
- Cain and Abel
- Israel at 50
- Ethnic Silhouettes
