= Avraham Oz =

Israeli theatre director, translator and peace activist

- אברהם עוז
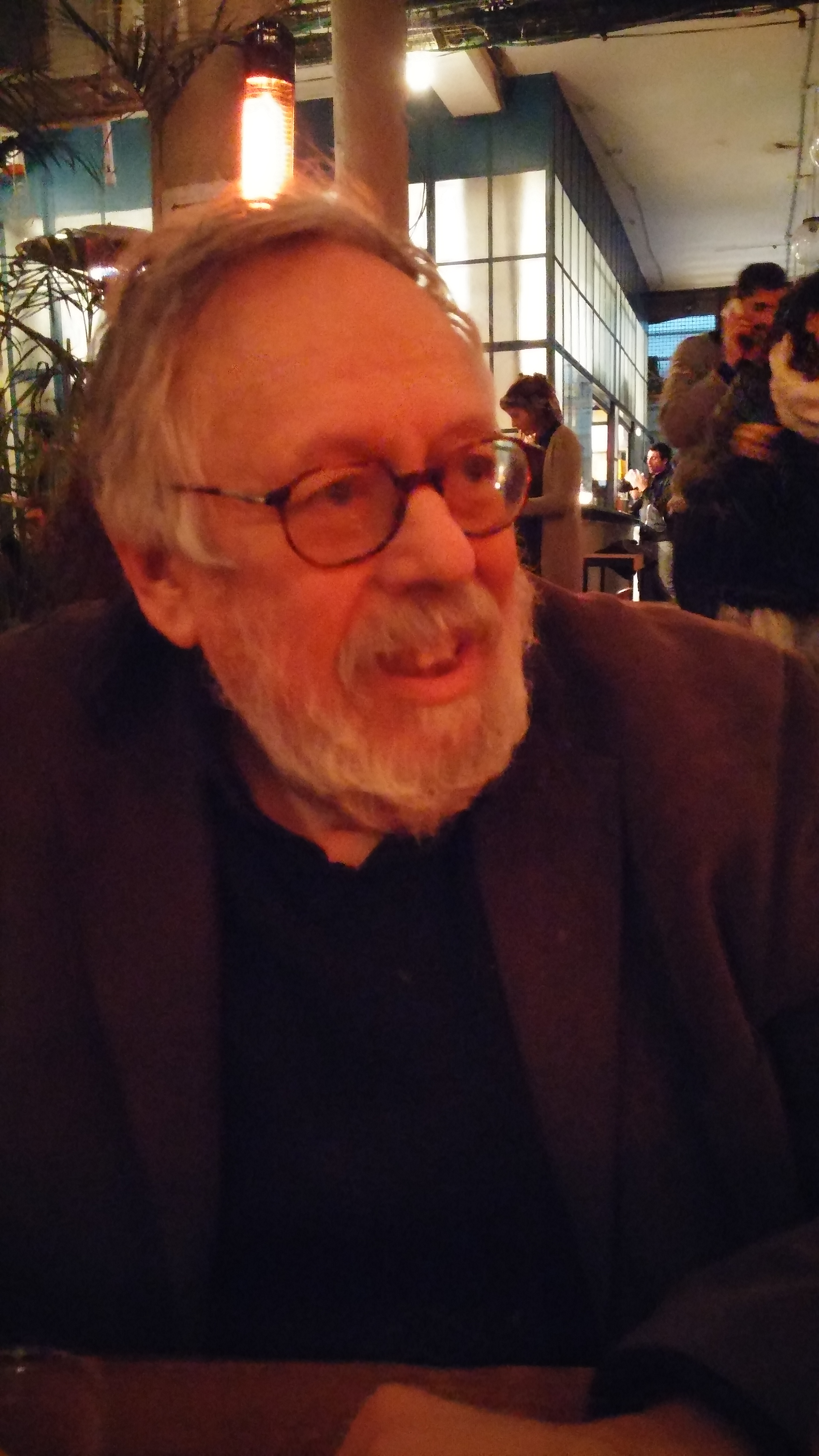
- Professor Emeritus, University of Haifa
- Born: May 23, 1944 (age 82); Tel Aviv, Mandatory Palestine
- Occupations: Theatre director, translator, peace activist
- Spouse: Tal Itzhaki
- Writing career
- Genres: Literary criticism, translation
- Website: research.haifa.ac.il/~theatre/oz.html

Avraham Oz (Hebrew: אברהם עוז; born May 23, 1944) is an Israeli Professor Emeritus of theatre, Hebrew and comparative literature at the University of Haifa. He has also translated several English literary works into Hebrew and is a well-known peace activist. He specializes in English theatre and drama, William Shakespeare, political theatre, and theatre theory.

== Early life and education ==
Avraham Oz was born 23 May 1944 in Tel Aviv, Mandatory Palestine, an only child to Itzhak Hoz, a bus driver, and Malka (Marussia) née Lifshitz, a retired beauty spa manager.

He earned a B.A. in English literature and theatre arts (1967) and a M.A. in English literature (1970) from Tel Aviv University, and a PhD in English literature (1980) from the University of Bristol.

== Career ==
He has taught at the University of Haifa, Tel Aviv University, and the Beit Zvi School of Dramatic Art; Hakibbutzim Seminar College and Sapir Academic College, and as a visiting lecturer at the Hebrew University of Jerusalem and the University of Delaware. He also, for many years, served as an associate artistic director at the Cameri Theatre, and dramaturg at the Haifa Municipal Theatre. In 2010, he was a founding member of the Academy of Performing Arts, Tel Aviv, which combines professional training with studies towards a BA degree, in cooperation with the Open University of Israel. He serves at the Academy of Performing Arts, Tel Aviv as a professor of theatre and a stage director.

From 1982 to 1986, he served as the Head of the Department of Theatre Arts, Tel Aviv University. In 1984, he founded and edited Assaph: Theatre Studies published by Tel Aviv University; in 1994, he founded the Department of Theatre at the University of Haifa and served as its first chairman, and in 1995, he edited JTD: Journal of Theatre and Drama, published by the University of Haifa. From 2000 until its closure in 2004, he served as the director of the Haifa University Theatre. In 2007, he founded Mofa, an electronic journal for theatre and the performing arts, for which he serves as an editor.

Oz is also the general editor of the Hebrew edition (single volume series) of the works of William Shakespeare, and served as the president of the Israeli Association for Theatre Research (IATR).

Oz directed several stage plays, among them, Shakespeare's The Merchant of Venice and Henry V, Harold Pinter's Ashes to Ashes, Mountain Language, and Landscape; C. P. Taylor's Good, and his own play Glorious Mountain. He is a resident director at the Alfa Theatre in Tel Aviv. His play Glorious Mountain (2021) is a historical fantasy on the first immigration to Palestine at the end of the 19th century and the birth of Zionism, being a critique of the latter. His play, Pipes (2023), depicts the assassination of Jacob Israël de Haan, the first political murder by Jews in modern Palestine. His play More Colour to Flowers (2025) deals with anti-war poetry through the relationship of Wilfred Owen and Siegfried Sasson at Craiglockhart War Hospital in 1917.

Among his many Hebrew translations of plays and operas, commissioned and performed by all major theatre companies in Israel and the New Israeli Opera, are: William Shakespeare's The Merchant of Venice, As You Like It, Coriolanus, Romeo and Juliet, The Tempest, King Lear, Julius Caesar, Henry V, and A Midsummer Night's Dream; Bertolt Brecht's Life of Galileo, A Respectable Wedding, The Resistible Rise of Arturo Ui, Three Penny Opera, Rise and Fall of the City of Mahagonny, and The Seven Deadly Sins; Harold Pinter's The Homecoming, Betrayal, Landscape, Silence, One for the Road, Ashes to Ashes, The New World Order, Party Time, and Mountain Language; C. P. Taylor's Good; Engelbert Humperdinck's Hänsel und Gretel; Wild Honey, an adaptation, by Michael Frayn, of an untitled work by Anton Chekhov; and Agamemnon, by Aeschylus, as adapted by Steven Berkoff; and Peter Turrini's Figaro.

Oz was also previously a theatre critic for two of the major daily papers in Israel (Lamerhav, and later Ha'aretz) as well as on the Israeli National Radio. From 1968 to 1973, Oz served as a theatre editor for the literary magazine Akhshav, and had a weekly show on theatre on the Israeli National Radio from 1968 to 1971, and edited and presented several TV series on theatre and William Shakespeare.

== Activism ==
Oz is an internationally known peace activist in Israel. He is a founding member of the Committee for Solidarity with Birzeit University and the Committee Against the War in Lebanon. He has organized, spoken, and written extensively on subjects relating to achieving peace in the Middle East and ending the Israeli occupation of the Palestinian territories. In the spring of 2005, in a letter opposing a proposed UK academic boycott of Israeli universities (including his home institutions, the University of Haifa and Birzeit University), he stated: "Whenever asked, over the last few years I expressed my opinion that even though the repressive policies of [Israel] against the Palestinian population, especially in the territories occupied in 1967, is appalling, racist, sometimes horrifying in its cruelty, and often having crossed the boundaries of war crimes, academic boycott was neither morally justified nor effective." In the official biography of the Late Nobel Prize laureate Harold Pinter by Michael Billington, the famous playwright is quoted as having written, in 2005, to Oz: "Let's keep fighting!". On October 7, 2023, 5 members of his family were murdered at Kibbutz Be'eri by Hamas invaders from Gaza. On the evening of that day, Oz published a post on Facebook, saying: "A little question: why, to avoid killing, shouldn't one start a negotiation about exchanging kidnapped and prisoners?" During the entire Gaza war Oz issued almost daily calls for stopping the military attacks on Gaza. In a public letter read in July 2025, at the launch of a volume of his translations of anti-war poetry throughout the ages ("Beauty’s effect : Poems on Days of War and Other Days"), Oz wrote: "those who will gaze in astonishment at how the universe transformed and regressed into eras of savagery and disruption before donning the garments of enlightened culture, or those who will accept the unanchored foundational conventions of this age as given facts, as starting points for all conduct and law to come: In either case, they will confront, reflected back at them from the mirror of their own image of terror, Cain, father of murderers from time immemorial, bearing the mark engraved on his forehead, either for eternal shame or the prestige of vengeance, as guided by their inner moral voice, if indeed words like "morality" or "conscience" will still have any utility in the post-truth age. We shall all be seared with the branded mark. No one will be spared: those who committed murder, those who were silent, and even those who cried out but lacked the strength to stop the horror. In a world that has become Sodom, that turned its back on all restraint and anchor and failed to summon the power to rescue justice from its mad and lustful persecutors, there is not even one righteous person left."

== Personal life ==
He is married to Israeli theatre designer and translator Tal Itzhaki, the director of the Academy of Performing Arts, Tel Aviv and Alfa Theatre of Performing Arts.

== Bibliography ==
Author

- Shetar hi-hidah (The Riddle Bond: Studies in The Merchant of Venice) Tel Aviv: Hakibutz Hameuchad, 1990. (In Hebrew).
- The Yoke of Love: Prophetic Riddles in "The Merchant of Venice" (Newark, London and Toronto: University of Delaware Press, 1995. ISBN 0-87413-490-0 (10). ISBN 978-0-87413-490-2 (13).
- ha-Te'atron ha-politi : hasva'ah, meha'ah, nevu'ah (Political Theatre). Tel Aviv: Dvir/Haifa University Press, 1999. (In Hebrew).
- ha-Yetsirah ha-Sheḳspirit (Shakespeare). Tel Aviv : Miśrad ha-biṭaḥon, 2006. (In Hebrew.)
- Sadot u-Mizvadot: Tesot al Hadrama ha-Ivrit ve-Hasiper ha-Zioni (Fields and Luggage: Theses on Hebrew Drama and the Zionist Narrative). Tel Aviv : Resling, 2014. (In Hebrew.)
- Koho Shel Yoffi: Shirim Al Yemey Milhama VeYamim Aherim (Beauty's effect : Poems on Days of War and Other Days), poems and poetic translations, Haifa : Pardes Publishing House, 2025. (In Hebrew.)
- Sonetot Shakespeare (Shakespdeare's Sonnets), translation, with introduction and notes, Haifa : Pardes Publishing House, 2025. (In Hebrew.)

Editor

- Strands Afar Remote: Israeli Perspectives on Shakespeare. International Studies in Shakespeare and His Contemporaries ser. Wilmington, DE: U of Delaware P, 1998. ISBN 0-87413-597-4 (10). ISBN 978-0-87413-597-8 (13).
- Marlowe. New Casebooks ser. New York and London: Palgrave Macmillan, 2003. ISBN 0-333-62498-X (10). ISBN 978-0-333-62498-2 (13).
- [with Susan Haedicke, Deirdre Heddon, and E.J. Westlake] Political Performances: Theory and Practice. New York and Amsterdam: Rodopi, 2009.
