= Hillel Markman =

Israeli ballet dancer (1930–2022)

Hillel Markman (Hebrew: הלל מרקמן; 1930 – 11 December 2022) was an Israeli ballet dancer. Together with Berta Yampolsky, he founded the Israel Ballet.

== Biography ==
Hillel Markman was born in Haifa in 1930, to a Jewish family of Russian origin. He studied at the High School and was considered an outstanding athlete.

He later served in the Navy, where he became interested in ballet against the wishes of his father, who hoped that Hillel would complete the full engineering education at the Technion that he had begun at the time. While serving in the Navy, he began taking ballet lessons at the studio of the Haifa teacher Valentina Arkhipova-Grossman, where he met his future wife, 16-year-old Berta Yampolsky.
