= Igal Perry =

Israeli choreographer

- Citizenship: Israeli
- Occupation: choreographer
- Organization: Peridance Contemporary Dance Company
- Website: https://www.peridance.com/

Igal Perry is an Israeli choreographer. He is the founder of Peridance Contemporary Dance Company.

Perry has performed at the Carmiel Dance Festival. He has worked at the Bat Dor Dance Company and the Batsheva Dance Company in Israel.
