= Tmu-na Theater =

Community Theater and Performance center

Coordinates: 32.0664°N 34.7878°E

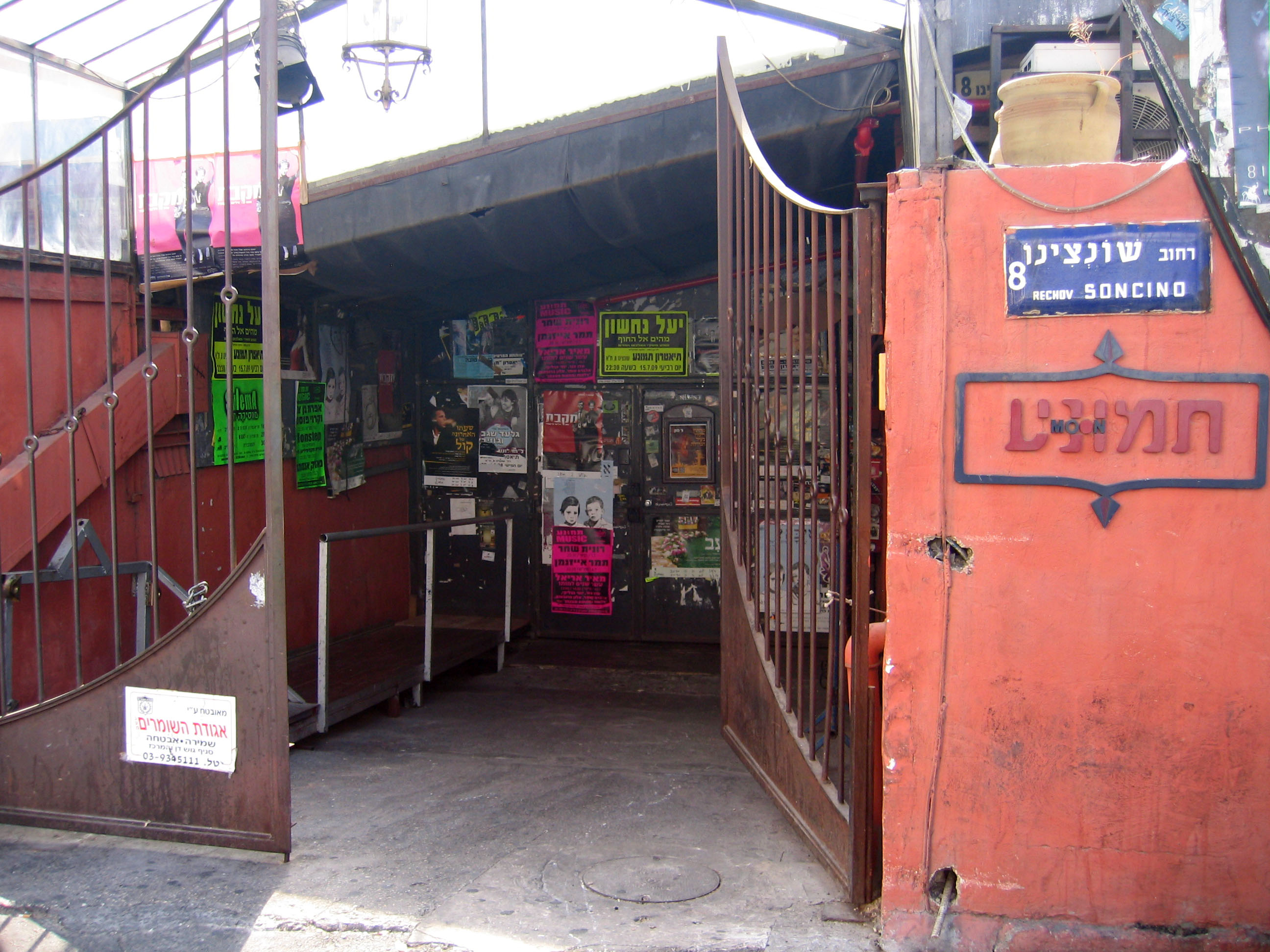
Tmu-na Theater

Tmu-na Theater (Hebrew: תיאטרון תמונע) is a community theater and performance center, featuring acts that veer towards the fringe and avant garde. The theater is situated on Soncino Road 8 in the Montefiore neighborhood of Tel Aviv, Israel, and contains four event halls. The theater's artistic director is Nava Zuckerman.

The theater was founded in 1987 by Nava Zuckerman, with the help of Micky Zuckerman and Ilan Rozental, at first as a place for fringe productions of the ensemble of the theater, which Nava Zuckerman had established in 1981. The "Tmu-na" Ensemble had a repertoire of circa 30 plays and participated in various festivals in Israel and the rest of the world, among them the Acre Festival, the Israel Festival, Theatronetto, the Edinburgh Festival, and others. The ensemble has roughly 140 performances per year.

Since 1999 the place has developed into a multidisciplinary center for dance, music, literature and the fine arts as well. It annually exhibits more than 550 theater shows, around 80 dance acts, 50 literature and poetry nights and over 350 music events and more.
