= Ayin Hillel =

Israeli poet and children's writer

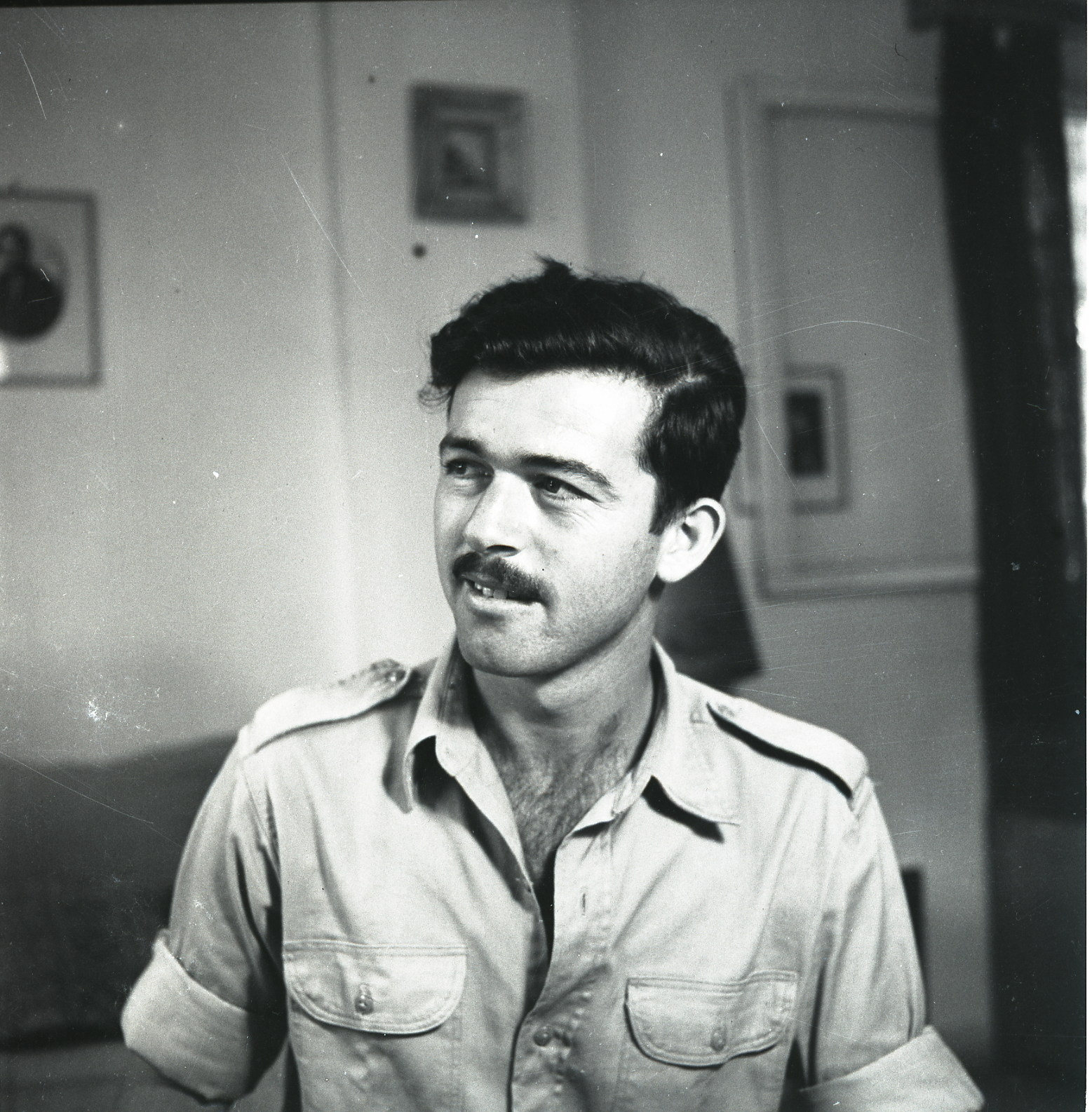
Ayin Hillel, 1949

Ayin Hillel (Hebrew: ע. הלל) was the pen name of Hillel Omer (4 August 1926 - 30 June 1990, Hebrew: הלל עומר), an Israeli poet, children's author, and landscape architect.

== Biography ==
Hillel Kotovitz (later Omer) was born in Kibbutz Mishmar HaEmek in the Jezreel Valley to Binyamin and Shlomit Kotovitz. He fought in the Palmach during the 1948 Arab-Israeli War. From 1954 to 1969 he was a landscape designer in Jerusalem. He designed the city's botanical and biblical gardens and continued to work in landscaping after moving to Tel Aviv. He was married to Zipporah Lerman, with whom he had three daughters, Tal Omer, Nuli Omer and Loulou Omer.

== Literary career ==
Ayin Hillel's work has been translated into English, French, German, Greek, Hungarian, Spanish, and Russian. Among his most famous compositions are "Why Does the Zebra Wear Pajamas" (1959) and "Uncle Simcha" (1964).

Ayin Hillel's poem, Hanesher (The Vulture), is written in Biblical Hebrew, but expresses the doubts and disillusions of the twentieth century.

== Awards and recognition ==
- 1976: Levi Eshkol Prize
- 1986 Yaakov Fichman Prize
- 1988: Aharon Ze'ev Prize for Children's and Youth Literature, lifetime achievement award
- 1990: Hans Christian Andersen Award for his contribution to children's literature.

== Published works ==
=== Poetry ===
- The Noon Country, Sifriat Poalim, 1950 [Eretz Ha-Tzohorayim]
- Nisra, The Author, 1962 [Nisra]
- Hunting Madness, Am Oved, 1964 [Teruf Toref]
- Eulogy, Hakibbutz Hameuchad, 1973 [Hodayah]
- Speak, Hakibbutz Hameuchad, 1980 [Dabri]
- Joseph and Potiphar's Wife, Hakibbutz Hameuchad, 1982 [Yossef Ve-Eshet Potifar]
- Until Now, Hakibbutz Hameuchad, 1983 [Ad Co]
- Holon's Fables, Sifriat Poalim, 1991 [Mishlei Holon]

=== Children's books ===
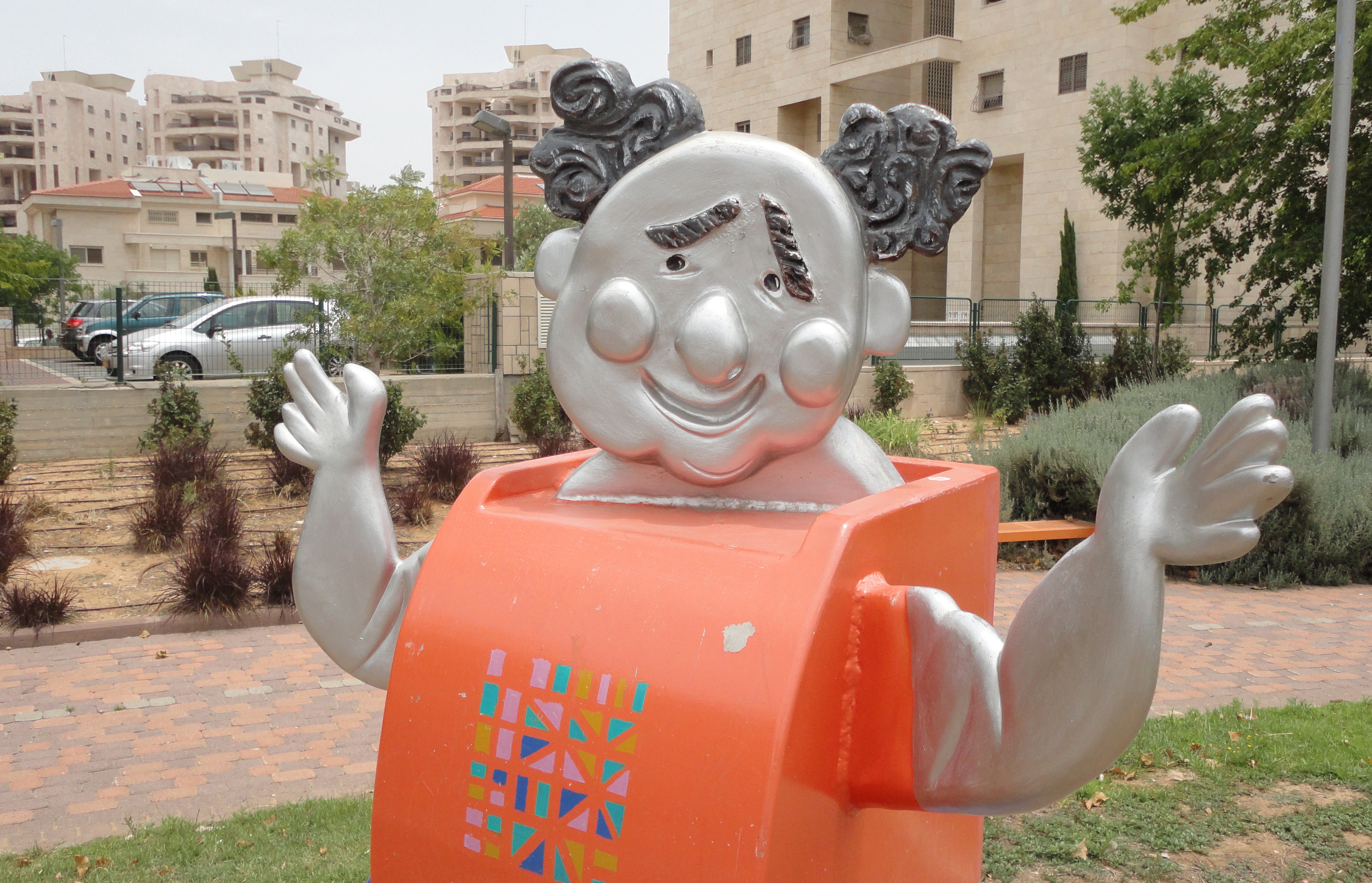
Dodi Simha sculpture

- Why Does the Zebra Wear Pajamas?, Sifriat Poalim, 1959 [Lama Loveshet Ha-Zebra Pijama]
- Abroad, Abroad!, Sifriat Poalim, 1960 [Hutz La-Aretz, Hutz La-Aretz]
- Nobody Can See Me, Massada, 1967 [Oti Lir'ot Af Ehad Lo Iachol]
- Uncle Simcha, Hakibbutz Hameuchad, 1969/99 [Dodi Simha]
- I'm a Warbler, Hakibbutz Hameuchad, 1970 [Ani Pashosh]
- Good Morning, Hakibbutz Hameuchad, 1971 [Boker Tov]
- Bulbul, Why?, Massada, 1972 [Bulbul, Lama Kacha?]
- Birdie, Birdie, Hakibbutz Hameuchad, 1973 [Rom Tziporim Tziporim Tzip]
- Giraffe in Blue Jeans, Hakibbutz Hameuchad, 1976 [Giraf Be-Jeans Kahol]
- Uncle Simcha's Voice, Hakibbutz Hameuchad, 1976 [Kol Dodi Simha]
- How Are You Mrs. Ladybird, Am Oved, 1977 [Shalom Lach Para Moshe Rabenu]
- From Fly To Elephant, Keter, 1977 [Mi-Zvuv Ve-Ad Pil]
- A Story About Cats, Keter, 1977 [Ma'ase Be-Hatulim]
- Yossi, Smart Child of Mine, Massada, 1978 [Yossi Yeled Sheli Mutzlah]
- Unbelievable, Ministry of Education, 1978 [Lo Yeuman]
- When Uncle Simcha Sings, Zionist Confederation, 1984 [Ke-She Dod Simha Shar]
- I'm a Warbler, Certainly and Maybe, Hakibbutz Hameuchad, 1987 [Ani Pashosh Betah Ve-Ulai]
- The Book of Scribble-songs, R. Sirkis, 1988 [Sefer Ha-Kishkushirim]
- A Cloud in My Hand, Sifriat Poalim, 1989 [Anan Ba-Yad]
- It Happened to a Fawn, Kinneret, 1989 [Ma'ase Be-Ofer Ayalim]
- Ayin Hillel's Big Book, Am Oved, 1992 [Ha-Sefer Ha-Gadol Shel Ayin Hillel]
- A Kibbutz Adventure, London, F. Warne, 1963

=== Other ===
- Blue and Thorns (Tkehlet vekotzim), Sifriyat Hapoalim, 1977

== See also ==
- Hebrew literature
