= Israel Ballet =

Israeli ballet company

General information
- Name: Israel Ballet
- Year founded: 1967
- Founders: Berta Yampolsky and Hillel Markman
- Principal venue: Tel Aviv Opera House
- Website: www.iballet.co.il

Senior staff
- Chief executive: Lea Lavie
- Director: Amit Somekh

Artistic staff
- Artistic director: Сlaire Bayliss Nagar

Other
- Official school: The Classical Ballet Center
- Formation: Principal; Soloist; Corps de Ballet

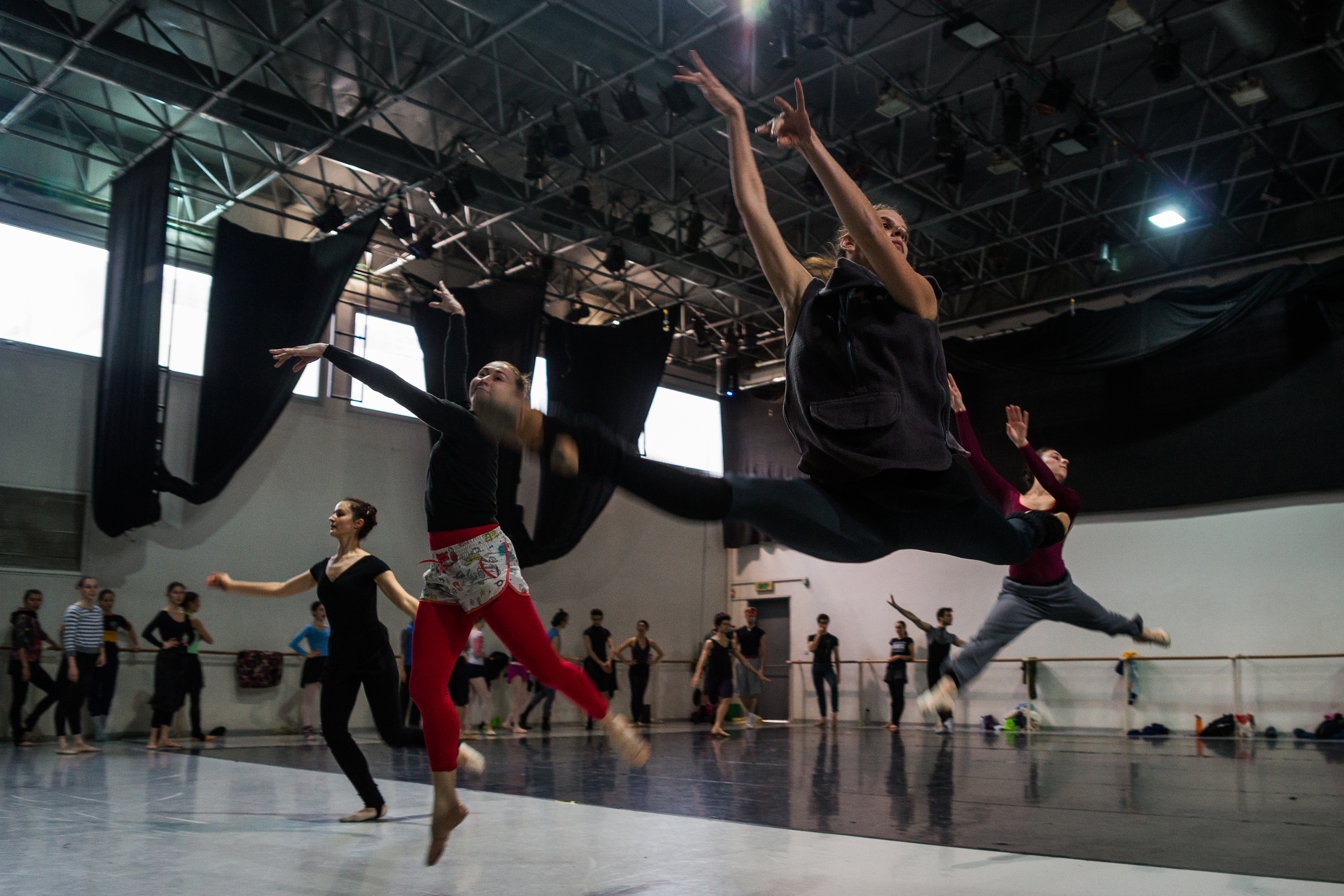
The Israel Ballet repetition backstage

The Israel Ballet is a dance company that performs works of classical ballet and neoclassical ballet. The company often stages newly choreographed works, and in addition, it is the only professional ballet company within Israel that stages works of the classical international repertoire. The Israel Ballet regularly tours internationally.

The company resides in the new Israel Ballet center in Tel Aviv, equipped with the biggest rehearsal hall in Israel with 250 seats. The Israel Ballet represented Israel in tours around the world and in important festivals in Europe, Asia and America.

== History ==
Founders Berta Yampolsky and Hillel Markman gave the first performance of the Israel Ballet on January 25, 1967, with a group of four young dancers, in Holon. George Balanchine granted permission to perform his work Serenade in 1975, and in 1981 he gave free performance rights to all of his works to the company.

== The Classical Ballet Center ==
The Israel Ballet has its own facilities in Tel Aviv. These facilities include a formal school of ballet, called The Classical Ballet Center, that is the leading Israeli institute.

== Repertoire ==
The Israel Ballet has many George Balanchine works in its current repertoire, thanks to his generosity in giving the company free performance rights. Balanchine works in the repertoire include Symphony in C, Square Dance, La Valse, Concerto Barocco and The Four Temperaments. Also in the repertoire are modern works by choreographers such as Christian Spuck, Rudi van Danzig, Jan Lincolns, Lar Lubovitch, and Krzysztof Pastor.

The company also has many original works in its repertoire by Artistic Director Berta Yampolsky. Besides her original works, Yampolsky has created new choreography for Sleeping Beauty and The Nutcracker. The Israel Ballet has a number of full-length classical ballets in its repertoire, including Onegin, Giselle, Don Quixote, Romeo and Juliet and Cinderella.

The Israel Ballet recently added a well-received new modern work to its repertoire, the "post-Forsyth" Hikarizatto by Itzik Galili.

== See also ==
- Dance in Israel
- Gertrud Kraus, founder of Israel Ballet Theatre (1950-1951)
- Culture of Israel
