= Orna Porat =

German-born Israeli theater actress (1924–2015)

- אורנה פורת
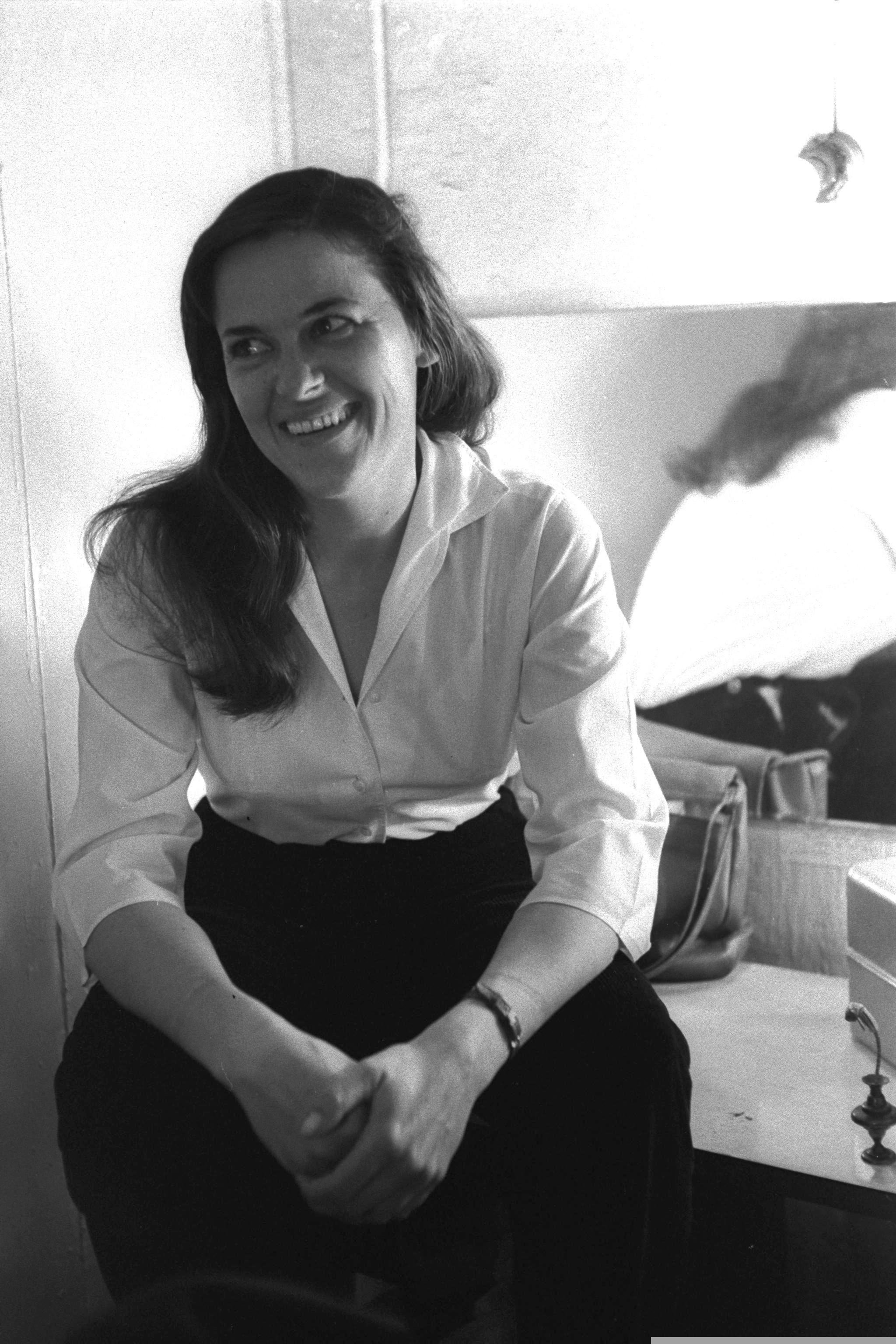
- Porat in 1957
- Born: Irene Klein; 6 June 1924; Cologne, Weimar Republic
- Died: 6 August 2015 (aged 91); Ramat Gan, Israel
- Citizenship: Israeli
- Occupation: Actress
- Spouse: Joseph Proter (m. 1946)
- Children: 2

Orna Porat (Hebrew: אורנה פורת; 6 June 1924 – 6 August 2015) was a German-born Israeli theater actress.

== Life and career ==
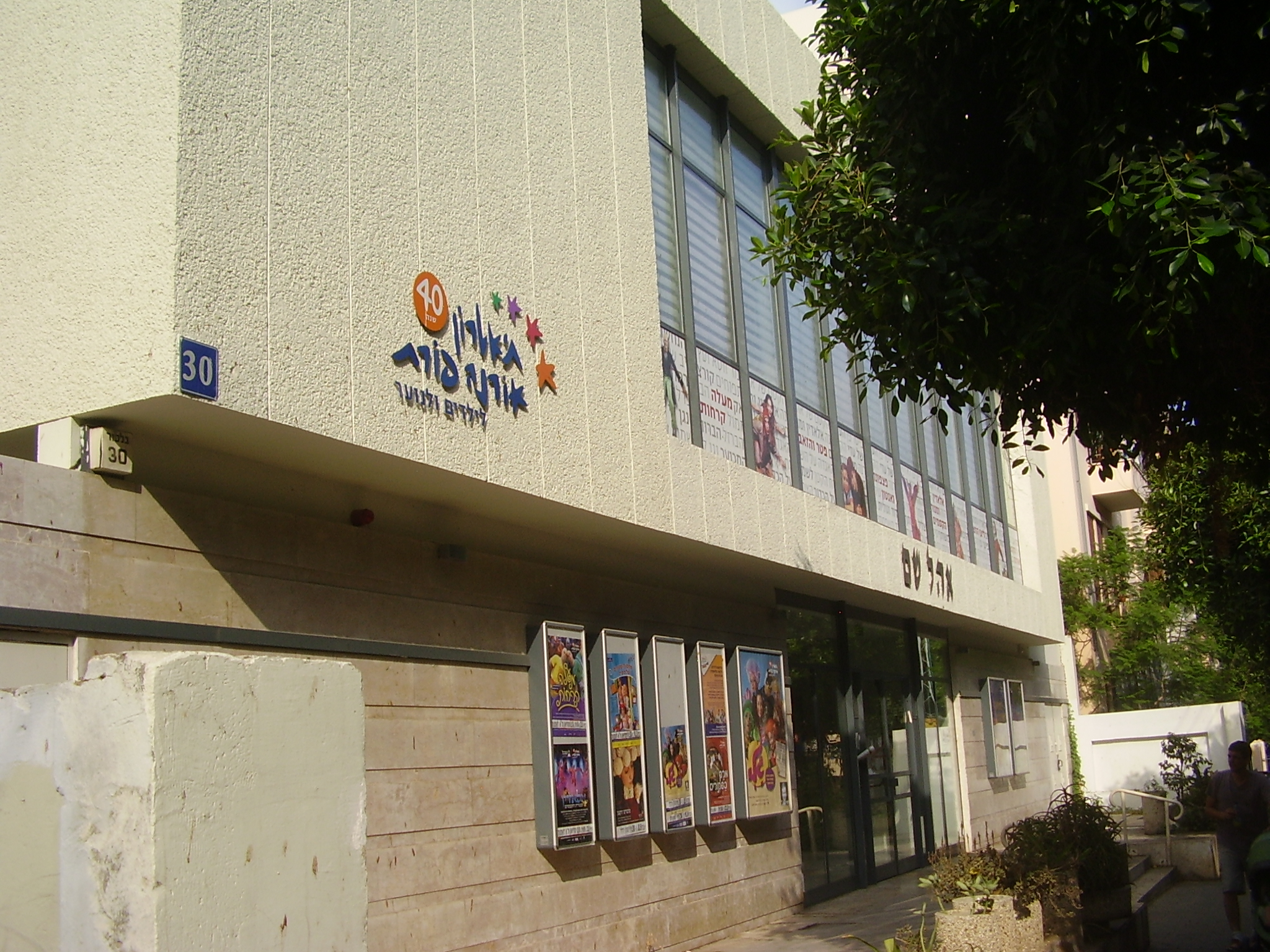
Orna Porat Children's Theater

She was born Irene Klein in Cologne, Germany, in 1924. Her father, Willi, was Catholic, and her mother, Elise, Protestant, but she chose atheism and socialism in her youth. In 1934 her family moved to Porz, where she attended high school. During these years, she was a member of the Hitler Youth, although her family opposed this affiliation.

She attended drama school and began her stage career at a repertory theater in Schleswig. She met her husband, Joseph Proter, in Schleswig. He was an officer from the British Mandate of Palestine in the Jewish Brigade of the British Army. In 1946, she moved to Palestine with Proter, and married him (in a civil ceremony). She converted to Judaism later, in 1957, and they held a Jewish ceremony before adopting two children. After being refused by the HaBima and Ohel theaters, she was accepted by the Cameri Theater. When she joined the Cameri, Yemima Millo suggested she change her name to a Hebrew-sounding one, Orna Porat. The suggestion was accepted. Yemima Millo also worked with Porat on her diction, aiming to soften her German accent. After the major financial and artistic crisis in the Cameri in 1958, Porat was appointed to the theater’s administrative board. She retired from the Cameri in 1984.

In the early 1960s, she spent three years in France and England studying children's theater. Upon her return to Israel she founded the Orna Porat Children's Theater, under the wing of the Cameri. In 1970, the children's theater became independent. Porat directed several productions. She retired from managing the Children's Theater after nineteen years. She helped establish ASSITEJ, an international children's theater association.

She died at the age of 91 on 6 August 2015 in Ramat Gan, Israel.

== Awards and recognition ==
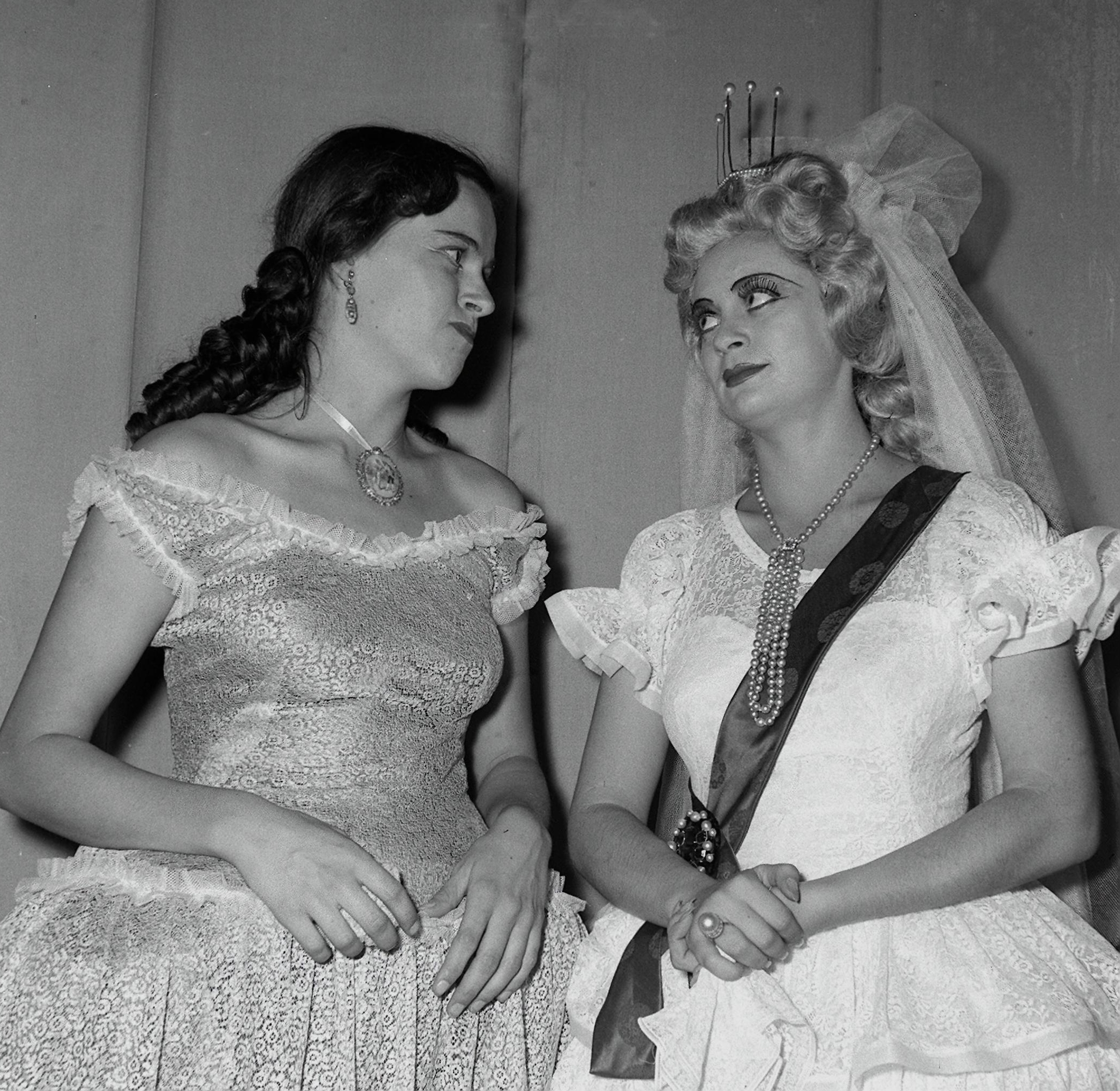
Hanna Meron and Orna Porat, 1949

- Porat won the Kinor David prize, awarded by Yedioth Ahronoth, on three occasions: in 1970; 1974 and 1980.
- In 1979, she received the Israel Prize for her lifetime achievement in theater.
- In 1997, she received the Israel Theater Lifetime Achievement award.
- In 2005, she won the EMET Prize for science, art, and culture, awarded by the Israeli Prime Minister.
- Other awards received by her include the Brenner Prize.

== See also ==
- Israeli culture
