= Yitzhak Laor =

Israeli poet and author (born 1948)

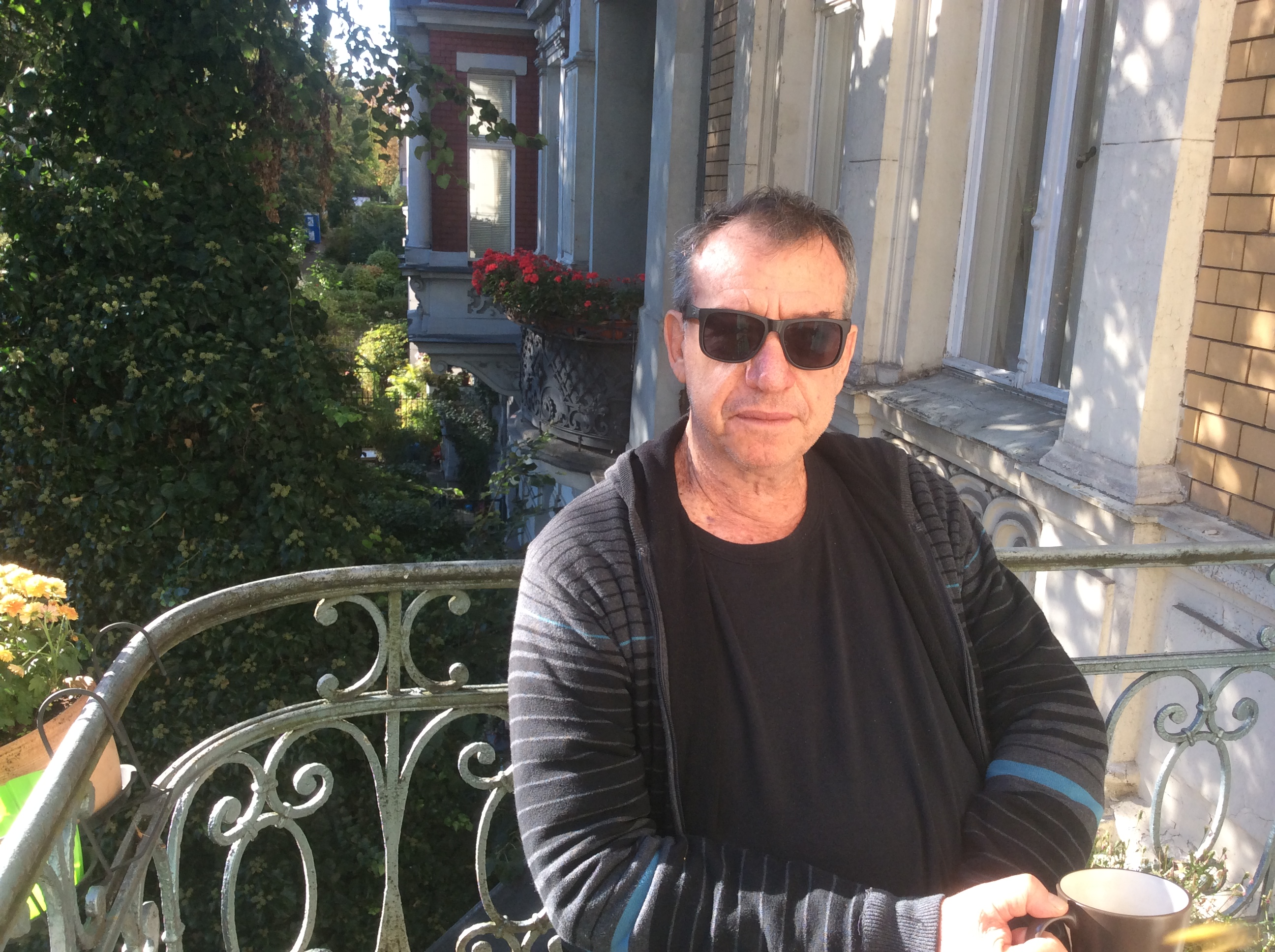
Yitzhak Laor

Yitzhak Laor (Hebrew: יצחק לאור; born in 1948) is an Israeli poet, author and journalist.

== Biography ==
Yitzhak Laor was born in Pardes Hanna.

== Literary and journalism career ==
He is the author of ten volumes of poetry, three novels, three collections of short stories, two collections of essays and one play.

In his poem "In a Village whose Name I don't even know" he imagines himself stranded in a Lebanese village: "For a moment I hoped that I would be caught". His book The Myths of Liberal Zionism was published in English by Verso Books in February 2009.

In a June 2011 article in Haaretz, Laor stated that he opposes Zionism: He claimed that "liberation from Zionism is not a dirty word... we have to get rid of Zionism".

== See also ==
- Israeli journalism
- Israeli literature
