= Bat-Dor Dance Company =

Bat-Dor was an Israeli dance company based in Tel Aviv, Israel, co-founded by Baroness Bethsabée de Rothschild and dancer Jeannette Ordman.

== History ==
Bat Dor made its debut in 1968 with Ordman as its leading dancer. The company had a large repertoire of modern works. Among the international choreographers who worked with Bat Dor are Antony Tudor, Rudy van Dantzig, Lar Lubovitch, Alvin Ailey, Mauricio Wainrot, Judith Jamison, Luciano Mattia Cannito, Hans van Manen, Martha Graham, Jiri Killian and Israelis Domy Reiter-Soffer, Igal Perry and Ido Tadmor.

The company closed down in July 2006 after Rothschild's death in 1999 left the company without funding.

== See also ==
- Culture of Israel
- Jewish dance
