= Ashes to Ashes (play) =

1996 British play

Ashes to Ashes is a 1996 play by English playwright Harold Pinter. It was first performed, in Dutch, by Toneelgroep Amsterdam, the Netherlands' largest repertory company, in Amsterdam, as part of its 1996–1997 season, and directed by Titus Muizelaar, who reprised his production, in Dutch with English surtitles, as part of a double bill with Buff, by Gerardjan Rijnders, at the Riverside Studios, Hammersmith, from 23 through 27 June 1998. Its English première by the Royal Court Theatre opened after the Dutch première, at the Ambassadors Theatre, in London, on 12 September 1996.

== Characters ==
- Devlin
- Rebecca

"Both in their forties" (n. pag. [ii]).

== Setting ==
"Time: Now" (n. pag. [ii])

Place: "A house in the country […] Early evening. Summer" (1).

== Synopsis ==
The one-act play opens with Devlin and Rebecca, described as "Both in their forties", talking in what appears to be a home living room on an early summer evening. As the play develops, it becomes clear that Devlin and Rebecca are probably married, although their relationship to each other is not defined explicitly; it must be inferred. Initially, Devlin seems Rebecca's husband or lover, her therapist, and potentially her murderer. Some critics have described their discussion as more between a therapist and his patient than between two lovers or between a husband and a wife.

Devlin questions Rebecca in forceful ways, and she reveals personal information and dream-like sequences to him. In their first exchange, Rebecca tells of a man who appears to be sexually abusing her and threatening to strangle her (1–27). Rebecca tells Devlin that she told the killer, "Put your hand round my throat" (3)—an act which Devlin acts out directly towards the end of the play (73–75), asking Rebecca to "Speak. Say it. Say 'Put your hand round my throat.' " (75). The first exchange is followed immediately by Devlin asking "Do you feel you're being hypnotized?" "Who by?" asks Rebecca. "By me," answers Devlin, adding "What do you think?", to which Rebecca retorts, "I think you're a fuckpig" (7–9).

In response to Devlin's further inquiries about her "lover", Rebecca relates several dream-like sequences involving the man who she has quoted initially (7–27). She tells Devlin that this "lover" worked as a "guide" for a "travel agency" (19). She goes on to ask, "Did I ever tell you about that place . . . about the time he took me to that place?" This place turns out to be "a kind of factory" peopled by his "workpeople" who "respected his . . . purity, his . . . conviction" (23–25). But then she tells Devlin, "He used to go to the local railway station and walk down the platform and tear all the babies from the arms of their screaming mothers" (27).

After a "Silence", Rebecca changes the subject abruptly with: "By the way, I'm terribly upset" (27). She complains that a police siren which she had just heard has disappeared into the distance. Devlin replies that the police are always busy, and thus another siren will start up at any time and "you can take comfort in that at least. Can't you? You'll never be lonely again. You'll never be without a police siren. I promise you" (29–30). Rebecca says that while the sound of the siren is "fading away," she "knew it was becoming louder and louder for somebody else" (29) and while its doing so made her "feel insecure! Terribly insecure" (31), she hates the siren's "fading away; I hate it echoing away" (31). (At the end of the play, an "Echo" of her words occurs.)

Rebecca tells Devlin that she had been writing a note, and that when she put the pen she was using down, it rolled off the table:

REBECCA: It rolled right off, onto the carpet. In front of my eyes.

DEVLIN: Good God.
REBECCA: This pen, this perfectly innocent pen.
DEVLIN: You can't know it was innocent.
REBECCA: Why not?
DEVLIN: Because you don't know where it had been. You don't know how many other hands have held it, how many other hands have written with it, what other people have been doing with it. You know nothing of its history. You know nothing of its parents' history.

REBECCA: A pen has no parents. (33–39)

In another monologue Rebecca describes herself looking out the window of a summer house and seeing a crowd of people being led by "guides" toward the ocean, which they disappear into like lemmings (47–49). That leads to her description of a condition that she calls "mental elephantiasis" (49), in which "when you spill an ounce of gravy, for example, it immediately expands and becomes a vast sea of gravy," Rebecca says that "You are not the victim [of such an event], you are the cause of it" (51). Referring both to the "pen" and anticipating the references to "the bundle" later in the play, she explains, "Because it was you who spilt the gravy in the first place, it was you who handed over the bundle" (51).

After an exchange about family matters relating to "Kim and the kids"—Rebecca's sister, Kim, Kim's children, and Kim's estranged husband (55–63), in which Rebecca may be conveying her own attitude toward Devlin in commenting on Kim's attitude toward her own husband—"She'll never have him back. Never. She says she'll never share a bed with him again. Never. Ever." (61)—there is another "Silence" (65). Devlin says, "Now look, let's start again" (65). Rebecca tells Devlin, "I don't think we can start again. We started...a long time ago. We started. We can't start again. We can end again" (67). "But we've never ended," Devlin protests (67). Rebecca responds, "Oh, we have. Again and again and again. And we can end again. And again and again. And again" (67). That exchange and Rebecca's reference to him earlier as a "fuckpig" demonstrate Rebecca's strong hostility toward Devlin.

After another "Silence" and Rebecca's and Devlin's singing the refrain from song alluded to in the play's title " 'Ashes to ashes' – 'And dust to dust' – 'If the women don't get you' – 'The liquor must' " (69). After a "pause", Devlin says "I always knew you loved me. […] Because we like the same tunes", followed by another "Silence" (69).

After it, Devlin asks Rebecca why she has never told him about "this lover of yours" and says how he has "a right to be very angry indeed" that she did not, "Do you understand that?" (69–70).

After another "Silence" (71), instead of responding, Rebecca describes another sequence, where she is standing at the top of a building and sees a man, a boy, and a woman with a child in her arms in a snowy street below (71–73). In her monologue, she shifts suddenly from the third-person "she" to the first-person "I", and Rebecca (not the woman) is "held" in Rebecca's own "arms": "I held her to me," and she listens to its "heart […] beating" (73).

At that point (73), Devlin approaches Rebecca and begins to enact the scene described by Rebecca at the beginning of the play, directing her to "Ask me to put my hand round your throat" as she has earlier described her "lover" as doing (73–75).

The last scene of the play recalls cultural representations of Nazi soldiers selecting women and children at train stations en route to concentration camps (73–85). She begins by narrating the events in the third person: "She stood still. She kissed her baby. The baby was a girl" (73), but she switches from the third person to the first person in continuing her narrative. As this narration develops, an "Echo" repeats some of Rebecca's words as she recounts the experience of a woman who has walked onto a train platform with a "baby" wrapped up "in a bundle," beginning with: "They took us to the trains" ("ECHO: the trains"), and "They were taking the babies away" ("ECHO: the babies away"), and then Rebecca shifts from using the third person "she" to using the first-person "I" (77): "I took my baby and wrapped it in my shawl" (77). Finally, Rebecca (or the woman or women with whom she has identified from such past historical events) is forced to give her baby wrapped in "the bundle" ("the bundle" being a synecdoche for the baby wrapped up in a shawl) to one of the men. As if Rebecca were such a woman, she recalls getting on the train, describing how "we arrived at this place"—thus recalling the other "place" about which she asks Devlin early in the play, the "factory": "Did I ever tell you about that place . . . about the time he [her purported lover] took me to that place?" (21).

In the final lines of the play, as if the woman's experience were her own, Rebecca shifts again significantly from the third-person "she" used earlier relating to the woman to the first-person "I", while denying that she ever had or ever knew of "any baby":

REBECCA: And I said what baby

ECHO: what baby
REBECCA: I don't have a baby
ECHO: a baby
REBECCA: I don't know of any baby
ECHO: of any baby
Pause.
REBECCA: I don't know of any baby
Long silence.

BLACKOUT. (83–84)

== Production history ==
=== World première ===
Ashes to Ashes was first performed, in Dutch, by Toneelgroep Amsterdam, the Netherlands' largest repertory company, in Amsterdam, as part of its 1996–1997 season, and directed by Titus Muizelaar, who reprised his production, in Dutch with English surtitles, as part of a double bill with Buff, by Gerardjan Rijnders, at the Riverside Studios, Hammersmith, from 23 through 27 June 1998.

The translation and dramaturgy were by Janine Brogt, the set was designed by Paul Gallis, and lighting was designed by Henk Bergsma, and the cast included:

The cast included:

- Pierre Bokma (Devlin)
- Lineke Rijxman (Rebecca)

=== London première ===
The London première was directed by the playwright Harold Pinter and designed by Eileen Diss for the Royal Court Theatre, at the Ambassadors Theatre, in London, opening on 12 September 1996, with the following cast:

- Stephen Rea (Devlin)
- Lindsay Duncan (Rebecca)

Lighting was designed by Mick Hughes, costumes designed by Tom Rand, and sound designed by Tom Lishman.

=== French première ===
Harold Pinter also directed the French-language creation of Ashes to Ashes at the Théâtre du Rond-Point in Paris in 1998. The play was translated by Éric Kahane, regular translator of Pinter's works. The characters of Rebecca and Devlin were played by Christine Boisson and Lambert Wilson.

=== New York première ===
The American première, directed by Karel Reisz, was part of the 1998–1999 Laura Pels Theatre Season at the Gramercy Theatre, produced by the Roundabout Theatre Company, in New York City, from 7 February to 9 May 1999. Lindsay Duncan reprised her role as Rebecca, and David Strathairn played the role of Devlin. Set and costume design was by Tony Walton, lighting design by Richard Pilbrow, and sound design by G. Thomas Clark.

=== London revival ===
Ashes to Ashes was revived in Spring 2001 in a double bill with Mountain Language, directed by Katie Mitchell, at the Royal Court Theatre, which went on to be performed at the Harold Pinter Festival at the Lincoln Center Festival 2001, in New York City, in July and August 2001.

=== Europe Theatre Prize ===
A special creation for the 16th edition of the Europe Theatre Prize was performed by Isabelle Huppert and Jeremy Irons at Teatro Argentina, Rome, on 17 December 2017.

== See also ==
- The Holocaust

== Works cited ==
- Merritt, Susan Hollis. "Ashes to Ashes in New York". In The Pinter Review: Collected Essays 1997 and 1998. Francis Gillen and Steven H. Gale (eds.) Tampa. FL: University of Tampa Press, 1999. 156–59. ISBN 1-879852-11-X
- Merritt, Susan Hollis. "Harold Pinter's Ashes to Ashes: Political/Personal Echoes of the Holocaust". In The Pinter Review: Collected Essays 1999 and 2000. Francis Gillen and Steven H. Gale (eds.) Tampa. FL: University of Tampa Press, 2000. 73–84. ISBN 1-879852-13-6
- Pinter, Harold. Ashes to Ashes. London: Faber and Faber, 1996. ISBN 0-571-19027-8 (Parenthetical page references above are to the Grove Press edition. Pinter's textual pauses are indicated by his three spaced periods; other ellipses are indicated by three unspaced periods within brackets.)

== Published editions ==
- Ashes to Ashes (1996)
- Plays four (2005) pp. 389–434, ISBN 978-0-571-23223-9
