= Berta Yampolsky =

French-born Israeli ballet dancer

Berta Yampolsky ברטה ימפולסקי
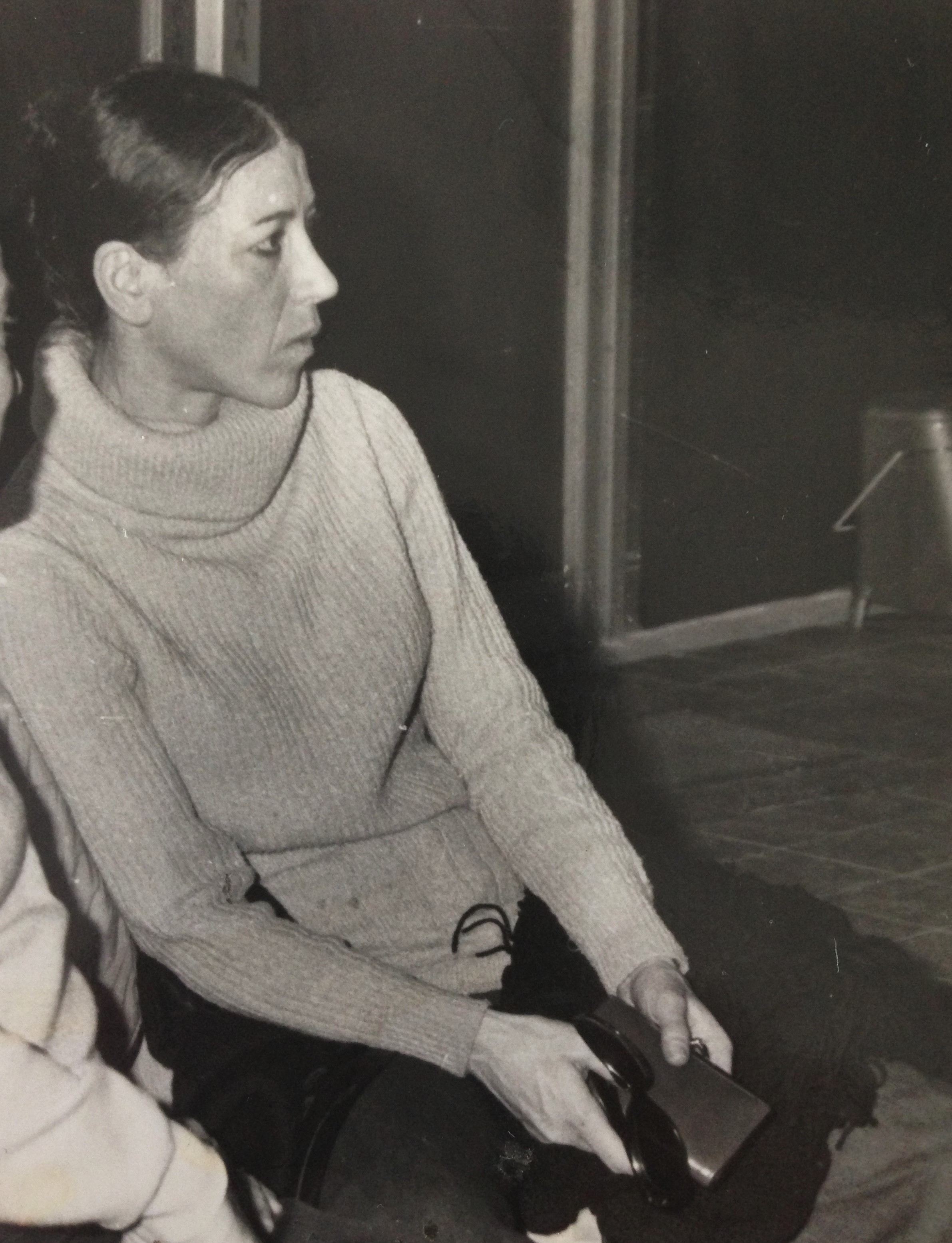
- Born: 1934 (age 91–92); Paris, France
- Education: Royal Academy of Dance
- Known for: Classical Ballet

Berta Yampolsky (Hebrew: ברטה ימפולסקי; born 1934) is a French-born Israeli ballet dancer and founder of the Israel Ballet.

== Early years ==
Berta Yampolsky was born in Paris. Her father, Naftali Yampolsky (1893–1980), was born in southern Russia. He was drafted into the Russian Imperial army, from which he succeeded in deserting and reached France. Her mother Yokheved (Vera) Shenker (1900–1980), was born in Odessa. She was the daughter of a fruit merchant. She studied medicine in Geneva and University of Paris, where she met Yampolsky.

When Berta was three years old, the Yampolsky family emigrated to Mandate Palestine. They resided in Haifa. Berta studied at a religious school for girls there, and at Hugim School as well as the Reali School.

She began to study dance with Valentina Arkhipova Grossman at the age of fourteen. Yampolsky met Hillel Markman, her future husband, in 1956. He was also a dance student. They married in 1957. The couple moved to England right after the marriage to continue dance studies. Hillel took lessons from Marie Rambert and Berta entered the Royal Academy of Dance. She also studied at Sadler's Wells. Both Hillel and Berta danced with many companies worldwide, including Belgium, Switzerland, France. They also performed with the Ballet Russe de Monte Carlo in USA. The couple returned to Israel in 1964. Upon return to Tel Aviv they were appointed as the main dancers and managers of the Israeli Opera's ballet company. After a year the couple decided to leave the opera, since their dream of starting a high-profile ballet company would not be possible if limited by their operatic performances.

== Israel Ballet ==
They couple's first independent company was an ensemble called The Classical Ballet of Holon, which they founded in 1967. Most of the performances of this company were based on duos from classical ballets. In 1970 Berta and Hillel established a ballet school in Tel Aviv. Their dance company grew up to include seven dancers. Yampolsky couldn't find high-profile local dancers in Israel and she and Hillel approached immigrants from the United States. Their first known soloists were Pamela Osserman and Marcia Zussman.

Until 1975, the company was modest local ballet without high visibility. In 1975 they were invited to perform at the Israel Festival. George Balanchine granted the company the rights to perform Serenade and Pas de deux from Agon free of charge. They also performed Electrobach by Félix Blaska at the festival. Practically unknown at that time, Israel Ballet surprised the audience and received a lot of enthusiastic reviews from the critics.

Yampolsky toured in the US with her Israel Ballet Company in 1975 and 1981. At that time it included twenty-five dancers. She was awarded prize for best foreign choreographer for her Dvorak Variations in Santiago, Chile.

Yampolsky was main choreographer for the following Israel Ballet's performances: The House of Bernarda Alba (1978), Carmen (1980), Untitled (1981), Dvorak Variations (1981), Mendelssohn Concerto (1982), Opus 1 (1983), The Nutcracker (1985) and many more. Yampolsky's works included classic and neo-classic styles.

Berta Yampolsky was Israel Ballet artistic director for forty five years till 2013. In 2018 Yampolsky published an autobiography named "The Optimists".

== Awards ==
- 1998 Lifetime Achievement in Dance. Ministry of Education and Culture. Israel
