= Orna Porat Children's Theater =

Coordinates: 32°4′0.98″N 34°46′32.66″E

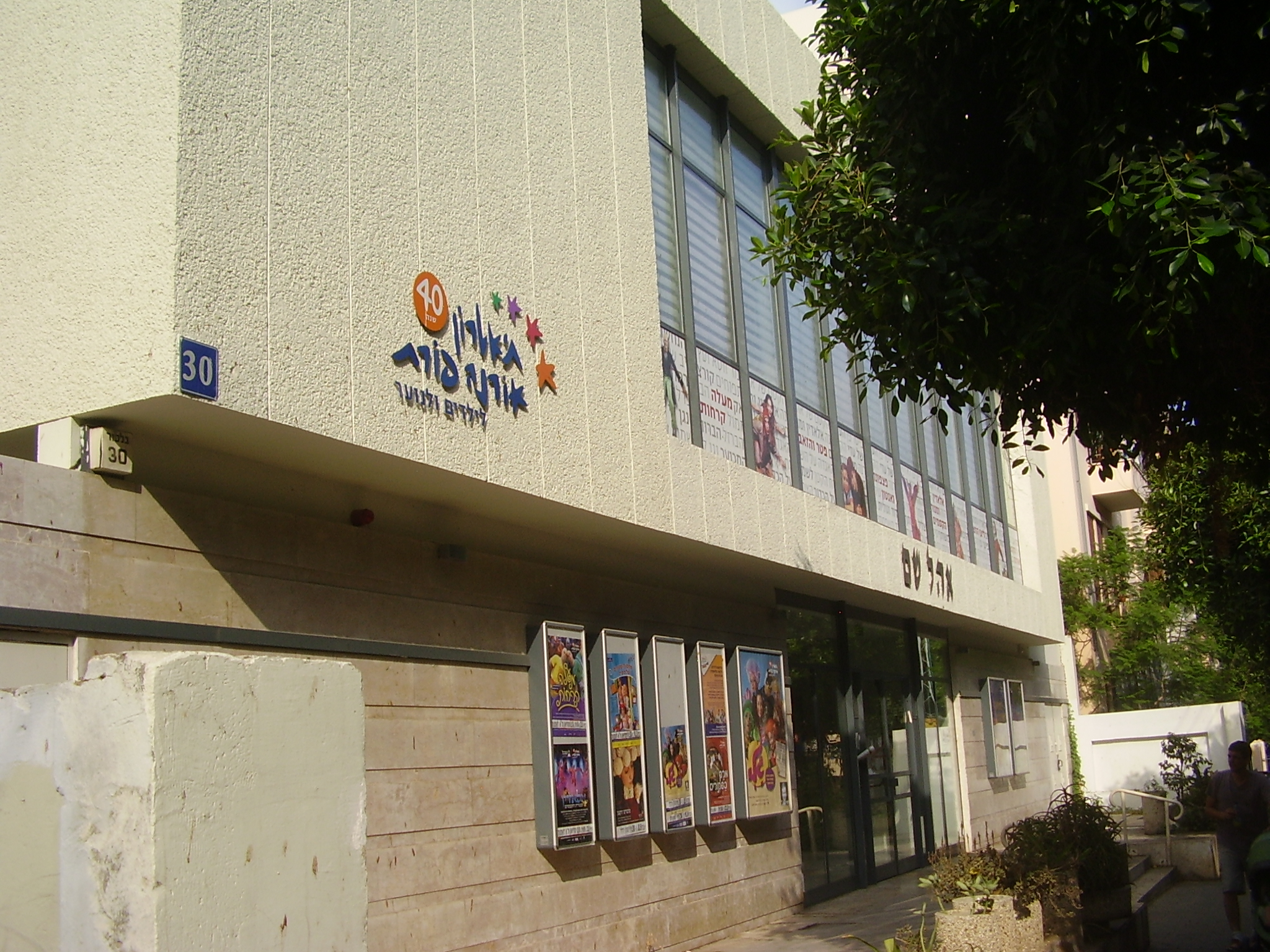
Orna Porat Children's Theater at Ohel Shem Hall

The Orna Porat Children's Theater is a children's repertory theater established in 1970 by Israel Prize winner and actress Orna Porat and Yigal Alon, the Minister of Education at the time. The theater is the oldest of its kind in Israel.

The theater is based at the Yaron Yerushalmi hall of the Suzanne Dellal Center for Dance and Theater in Tel Aviv.

The theater is a public non-profit organization, and all of its income is used to sustain its activities and advance its various goals. The theater is supported by the Ministry of Education and the Tel Aviv-Yafo Municipality. Its central goal is to expose young audiences to theater, presenting them with an artistic experience, as well as national and universal values through an encounter with art.

Every year the theater's repertoire of 20 plays is conducted on stage in front of 400,000 people at festivals, events, and theaters all over Israel and overseas. The theater's educational department organizes “theater days,” encounters with artists and authors, and workshops for children and youth. In 2010, the theater initiated the establishment of Yaron Festival – A World of Theater, which takes place annually during Purim and includes world-renowned plays, workshops, encounters with artists and authors, and more.

In 2011 the theater moved to the Ohel Shem building on Balfour Street, Tel Aviv.

The current CEO of the theater is Ran Gwetta and the current artistic director is Yaki Mechrez.

== Repertoire ==
- Tiny Theater
- Peter and the Wolf
- Korczak - Ten Matchboxes
- The Mutual Note
- The Jester
- Basic Training
- The Ascent of the Bald Ones
- Playing Theater
- Colors in the Sand
- Adi's Necklace
- The Lion who Roared Meow
- Something Wonderful is about to Happen
- Elephants don't dance ballet

== See also ==
- Culture of Israel
- The Arab-Hebrew Theater
- Habima Theatre
- Cameri Theater
