= Acco Festival of Alternative Israeli Theatre =

Annual performing arts festival in Acre, Israel

Program of the 1995 Acco Festival of Alternative Israeli Theatre

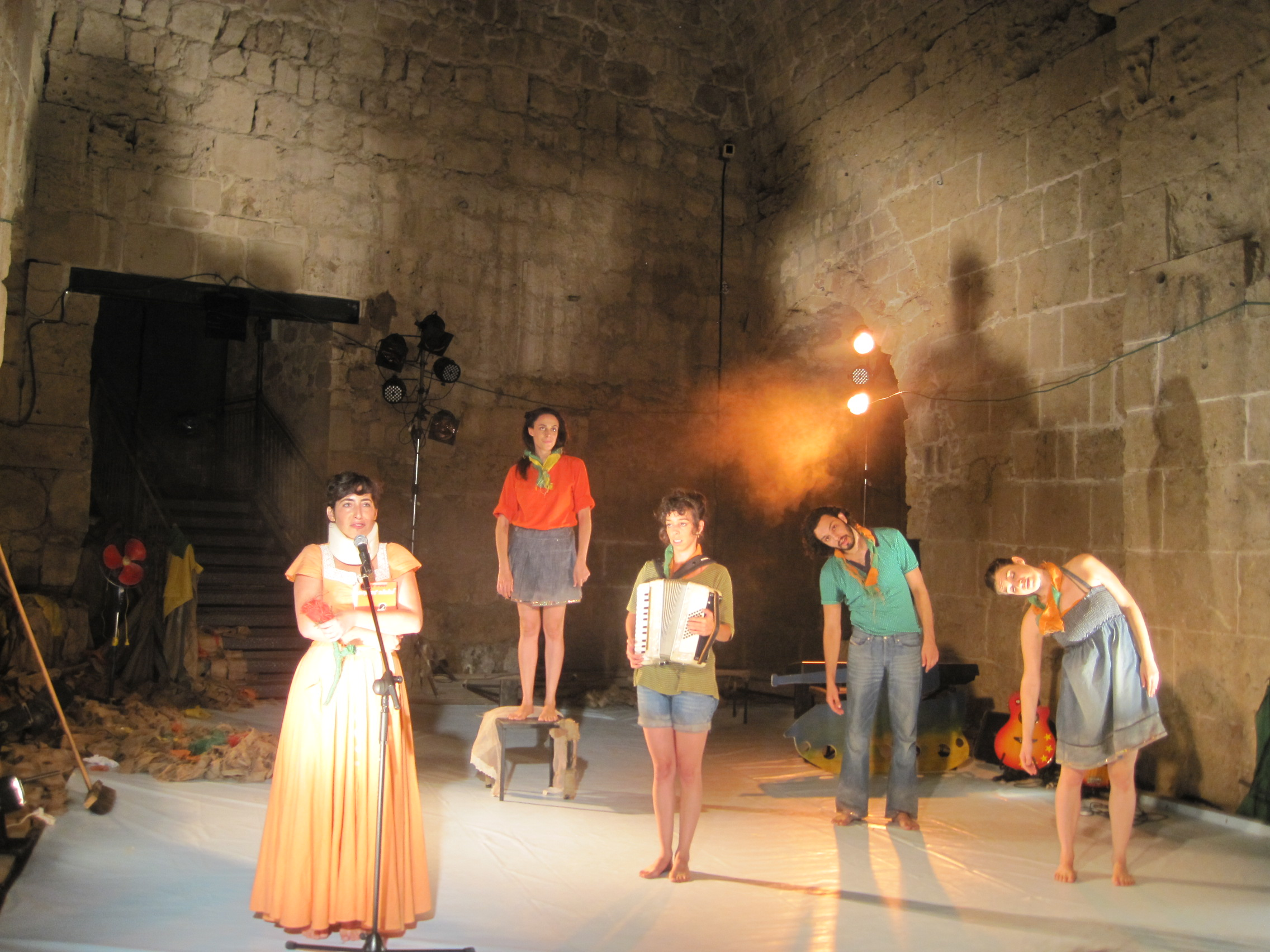
Acco festival, 2012

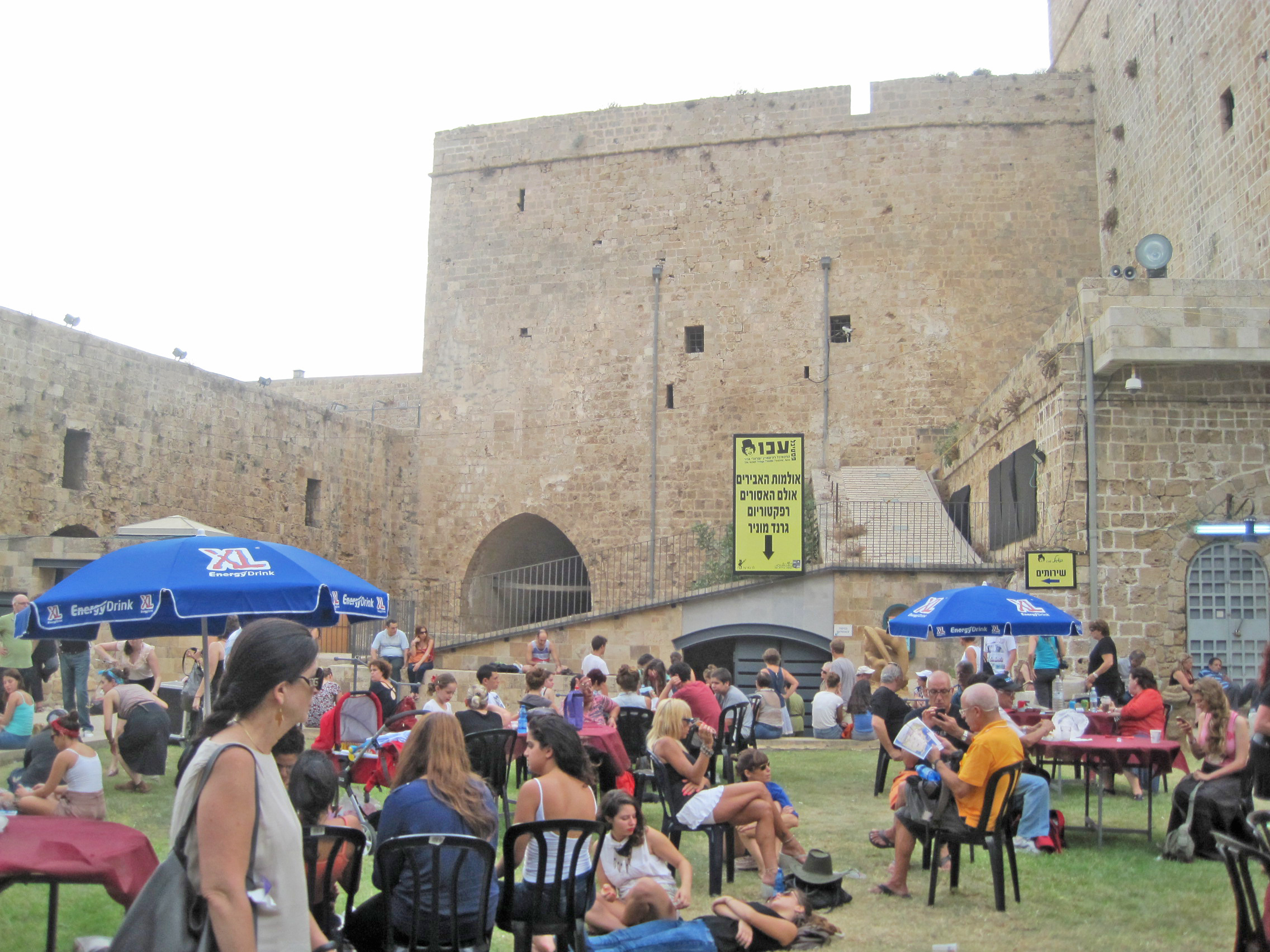
Festival goers in Old Akko

The Acco Festival of Alternative Israeli Theatre (also Acco Fringe Theatre Festival, Israel Fringe Theatre Festival) is a four-day performing arts festival held annually in the city of Acre, Israel during the Intermediate Days of the Sukkot holiday in early autumn.

== History ==
Founded in 1980, the festival features a competition for original plays that premier during the festival, along with local and foreign theatre productions, street theatre and open-air performances. There are also concerts, arts and crafts workshops, and lectures.

The majority of the Festival's plays come from outside the mainstream of establishment Israeli theatre, some having avantgarde characteristics and subjects giving outlet to their creators' personal statements. Some combine media and genres such as pantomime, clowning, video, dance, and performance art rarely seen in the conventional theatre. Many are staged in historic venues within the Old City of Acre, such as its Crusader-era citadel and knights' halls that have undergone conservation.

The Festival has been produced by the Municipality of Akko since the year 2000. It is supported by the Israel Ministry of Culture, the Old Acre Development Company and overseas philanthropic foundations.

The Acre Festival has become a symbol of coexistence between the city's Jewish and Arab inhabitants. Each year's program features works by Arab playwrights and troupes along with performances by music ensembles. Performance projects led by theatre professionals provide training for local Arab and Jewish teens, including immigrant youth.

The Festival has been postponed and scaled down twice due to interethnic disturbances: during the October 2000 events of the Second Intifada, and in 2008 due to the Yom Kippur riots, after which the Festival was held during the Hanukkah holiday week.

In 2018, it was noted that the "multi-ethnic" Festival's signs were posted in Hebrew only, avoiding Arabic, although Arabic is the native language of one third of the population of the city, and Arabic had been taken off the Festival’s logo. Member of Knesset Aida Touma-Suleiman, who lives in Acre, filed a complaint. In a reaction, the municipality wrote: "Acre is a model of coexistence and nobody can lecture us on that."

== See also ==
- Culture of Israel
