= Mountain Language =

Theater play by Harold Pinter

First UK edition cover

Mountain Language is a four-act play written by Harold Pinter, first published in The Times Literary Supplement (TLS) on 7–13 October 1988. It was first performed at the Royal National Theatre in London on 20 October 1988 with Michael Gambon and Miranda Richardson. Subsequently, it was published by Faber and Faber (UK) and Grove Press (USA). Mountain Language lasts about 25 minutes in production. It was most recently performed as part of Theatre of Menace (2016) at the Smock Alley Theatre in Dublin, starring Alisa Belonogina, Paul Carmichael, Lana O'Kell, Jaime Peacock, Louis Tappenden and Natasha Ryan

== Background ==
According to a letter from Pinter to The Times Literary Supplement, where it was first published and advertised, that publication's "advertisement ... stat[ing] that the play was 'inspired' by [Pinter's] trip to Turkey with Arthur Miller and is a "parable about torture and the fate of the Kurdish people" ... [are] ... assertions ... made without consultation with the author [Pinter]"; he continues: "The first part of the sentence [that it was inspired by Pinter's trip to Turkey with Miller] is in fact true. The play is not, however, 'about the fate of the Kurdish people' and, above all it is not intended as a 'parable'." As Grimes points out, "Pinter evidently believes his political plays are too direct to be seen as metaphors or parables" (90). As Pinter insists in that letter, the text has more universal relevance: "this play is not about the Turks and the Kurds. I mean, throughout history, many languages have been banned––the Irish have suffered, the Welsh have suffered and the Urdu and the Estonians' language banned." The dialogue does contain some identifiably contemporary British or Western cultural references, thereby showing its applicability to the Great Britain of the present, but the text of the play contains no explicit geographical place setting and no explicit time setting, rendering its setting in place and time simultaneously indeterminate and thus also broadly relevant.

== Characters ==
The play involves four main characters: a Young Woman (Sara Johnson), an Elderly Woman, a Hooded Man (Charley Johnson, husband of the Young Woman) and an unnamed Prisoner (son of the Elderly Woman). These characters are in stark contrast to the Officer, Sergeant and guards of the prison where the Hooded Man and the Prisoner are captives.

== Thematic relevance of language ==
Like the world of Pinter's 1984 play One for the Road, the world of this play exposes the power of language (Merritt 171–209; 275; Grimes 80–100). Pinter's play may allude to political and cultural contexts of Great Britain in the 1980s headed by the Conservative Party of Margaret Thatcher, which, for example, forbade the television networks from broadcasting the voice of the leader of Sinn Féin, Gerry Adams.

== Mountain Language rehearsal in Harringey, London ==
In 1996, the play Mountain Language was to be performed by Kurdish actors of the Yeni Yasam company in Harringey. The actors obtained plastic guns and military uniforms for the rehearsal. But a worried observer alarmed the police, which lead to an intervention by the police with about 50 police officers and a helicopter. The Kurdish actors were detained and forbidden to speak in Kurdish language. After a short time, the police realized they have been informed of the performance being played in Harrington, and allowed the performance to go ahead.
