= Yankalle Filtser =

Choreographer and dancer

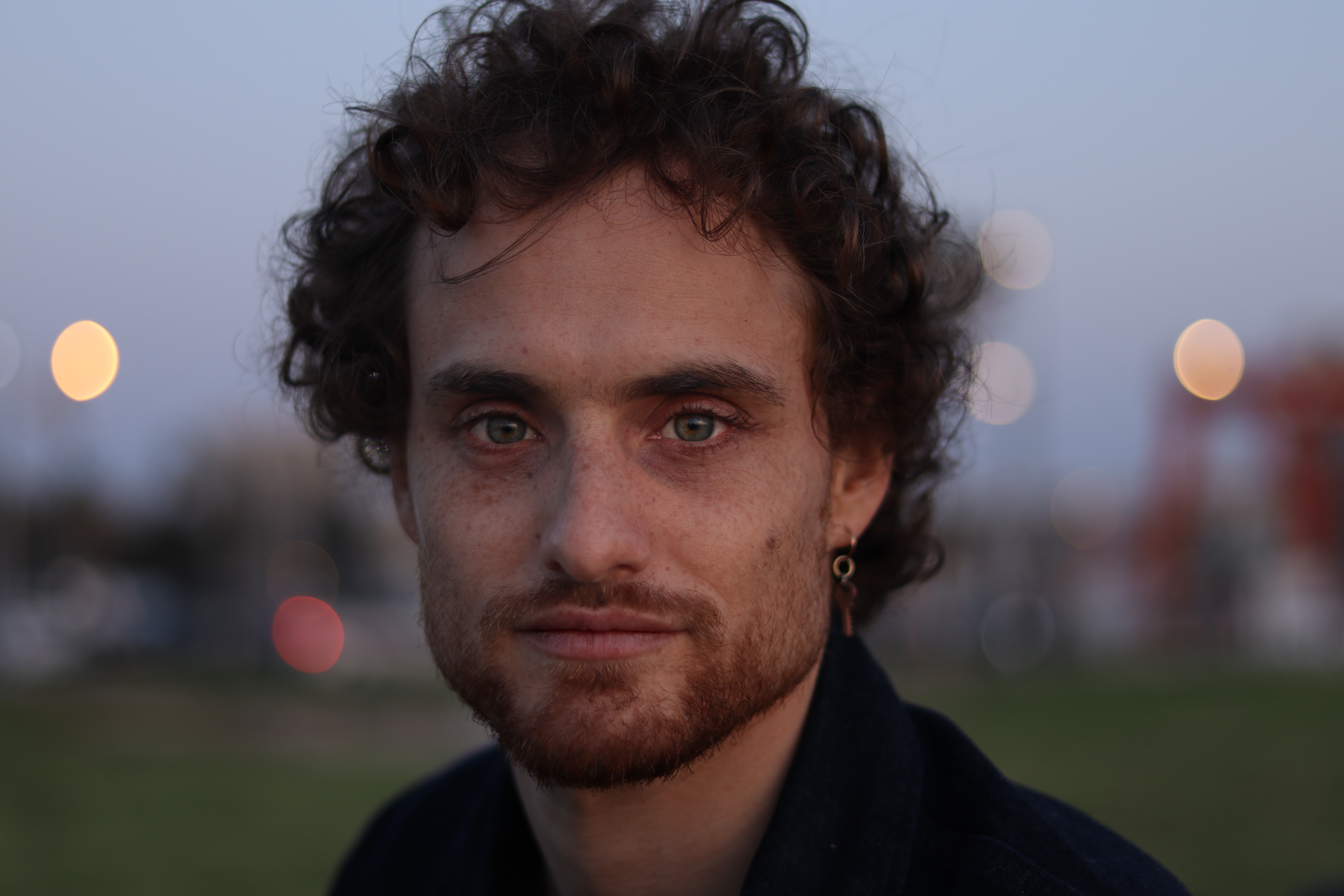
- Born: August 2, 1993
- Occupations: Choreographer, dancer, artistic director, actor, model
- Movement: Contemporary dance
- Website: yankalle.com

Yankalle (Yaacov) Filtser (Hebrew: יענקל׳ה (יעקב) פילצר, born August 2, 1993) is a choreographer, dancer, artistic director, actor, and model. He developed the choreographic method known as "Open Source Choreography."

== Early life ==
Filtser was born into an Orthodox Jewish family in Jerusalem. He began his dance training at secular studio while attending an Orthodox all-boys school. The tension between his religious upbringing and his passion for dance is reflected in his choreographic works.

He joined the Mehola Dance Ensemble in Jerusalem In 2000 and served as the house dancer at "Café Tav" in various festivals from 2006. In 2007, he chose to pursue a secular lifestyle to focus on dance. He graduated from the Jerusalem Academy of Music and Dance High School in 2011. Alongside his studies, Filtser initiated a public-space art project which included spontaneous art events with a group of a thousand interdisciplinary artists, while also funding his studies working as a street dancer.

In 2012, Filtser gained public attention after unknowingly being featured in a viral video by photojournalist Ilyan Marshak, which was later exhibited at the Eretz Israel Museum as part of the Local Testimony exhibition.

== Artistic career ==
In 2011, Filtser began studying at the Maslool dance training program in Tel Aviv, after which he worked as a freelance dancer. Filtser worked as a dancer with numerous choreographers. Over the years, he also collaborated with leading musicians such as Eviatar Banai, Noa, Noga Erez, Netta Barzilai, and others.

In 2014, Filtser joined the Batsheva Ensemble under the artistic direction of Ohad Naharin. He participated in the original cast of Naharin's "Project Secus" and the video "Echad Mi Yodea," which was displayed at the Israel Museum.

During this period, Filtser created his first dance work, "Otousan", involving ten Batsheva Ensemble dancers. Filtser drew inspiration for this work from Hasidic culture and significant events in his personal life. Haaretz magazine described it as "refreshing and crazy in the best sense of the word," and Naharin wrote about Filtser's ability to "distill emotion into spectacular dance moments with humor, intelligence, and a keen sense of composition".

In 2015, Filtser joined Inbal Dance Theater under the artistic direction of Barak Marshall. In 2016, he participated in Danceweb scholarship program, mentored by Tino Sehgal. That year, he also trained as an Ilan Lev method therapist. In 2017, he was certified as a Gaga teacher, the movement language developed by Naharin, and began teaching the method internationally. Between 2018 and 2019, Filtser danced as a soloist in a project by KCDC.

In 2018, he participated in the TV dance competition "MoveIt" produced by Keshet, where, despite being a contemporary dance performer, he joined the hip-hop team of choreographer Eden Shabtai, and reached the finals.

Following his participation in the show, Filtser created several dance works critiquing consumer culture. La Provence described the movement language of one of these works as "expressing a complete inner world", and noted that combined with the "brilliant mix of the soundtrack, a youthful and emotional performance was created." Works from this period included existing movement segments created by choreographer Eden Shabtai. Since then, Filtser's work has continued to feature the integration of existing (ready-made) movement segments by various choreographers. This practice draws inspiration from the "open-source" approach in technology, which inspired Filtser to develop a creation method called "Open Source Choreography." This method has become central to his choreography.

In 2019, Filtser founded the "As Is" dance festival at Sadnaot Habama Stage Center in Tel Aviv, involving the audience in the creative processes using the "Open Source Choreography" method.

In 2020, he joined the Israeli Choreographers Association.

In 2021, Filtser collaborated as a choreographer and dancer with musician Evyatar Banai, in a clip that paralleled Banai's relationship with his son to Filtser's relationship with his father. That year, he also created a joint show with Balkan Beat Box, Tamir Muskat, and Ori Kaplan in the Israel Museum.

In 2022, Filtser joined the ballroom scene in Israel and won Grand Prizes (2022 TLV Balroom All American Runway, 2025 Teder and TLV LGBTQ Center Dance Off). The ballroom scene and vogue dance have influenced his work since then.

Following the October 7 attack in 2023, which affected Filtser's close family who survived the massacre in the Gaza envelope, he created the volunteer dance project "Notes of Love." This project included performances for war survivors and evacuees. Simultaneously, in 2024, Filtser created the dance work "Knot War", aiming to share his personal perspective on war worldwide. The creation included Japanese rope art and was presented around the world in unconventional performance spaces and private homes.

In 2025, he received the Navon Prize in the field of dance. The same year, he created one of his most notable pieces, 'Playing with Fire', in collaboration with a wide range of artists. The piece was described by Portfolio magazine as "an original and immersive work that transcends the boundaries of dance, steps into the space, and powerfully engages with real life. An artistic experience of high involvement, intellectual depth, and strong emotional resonance"

Teaching

Filtser was invited to create choreography for dance training programs around the world, including Studio XL in Reggio Emilia, the Maslool Dance Training Program, and the Vertigo dance training workshop in Jerusalem.

Since 2016, Filtser has worked as a dance teacher at institutions and centers worldwide, including USC in Los Angeles, Chapman University in Orange, Les Hivernales CDCN dance center in Avignon, and the Inbal Pinto and Avshalom Pollak Dance Company. He also served as a judge in various dance competitions.

In 2025, Filtser was invited as a guest professor to Kennesaw State University by BAMAH organization, where he created his dance piece 'knot love'.

Acting

Since studying Chubbuck acting method in 2013, Filtser played various roles, including leading roles in the films "The Weaver" by Ron Gerber and Alon Barzilai (2013)' the award-winning film "Night Stroll" by Ori Birger (2021), and "Samuel on the Sand" by Mahmoud Abu Ghannam (2026), where he won best acting award at ClujShorts international film festival for "succeeding in building a human relationship that transcends beliefs and words, reaching toward the simplest gestures and the most mundane emotions."

Modeling

Filtser worked as a model for various fashion brands, including American Eagle, H&M, and Castro. He was presented as a model on Tel Aviv Fashion Week and magazines such as Vogue Italy.

== Grants and Scholarships ==
- 2002-2008, 2014-2014, 2020: America-Israel Cultural Foundation.
- 2010-2011: Full scholarship for the Batsheva Excellence Project.
- 2007-2011: Clore Foundation and the Academy of Music and Dance.
- 2011-2013: Tel Aviv Municipality for studies in the Tel Aviv Dance Training Program.
- 2016: Ministry of Culture and Sport for the Danceweb scholarship program in Vienna.
- 2019: The Independent Choreographers Foundation by the Ministry of Culture and Sport.
- 2021: The Rabinovich Foundation and the Tel Aviv Municipality.
- 2020, 2022: Israel Lottery Council for Culture and Arts.
- 2023: Full scholarship for participation in the Fall Festival B12 at Dock11, Berlin.
- 2021–present: Ministry of Culture and Sport.

== Artist Residency Programs ==
- 2018: Sadnaot Habama Center for Stage and Dance, Tel Aviv.
- 2019: MiMoDa Studio, Los Angeles, California.
- 2019-2021: Yafo Creative.
- 2021: RanchOm, Los Angeles, California.
- 2023: Second residency at RanchOm, Los Angeles, California.
- 2023: Hôtel De Ville, Beaumes-De-Venise, France.
- 2023-2024: Third residency at RanchOm, Los Angeles, California.
- 2025: Forth residency at RanchOm, Los Angeles, California.
- 2026: Megiddo Cultural Center.
