= Dance in Israel =

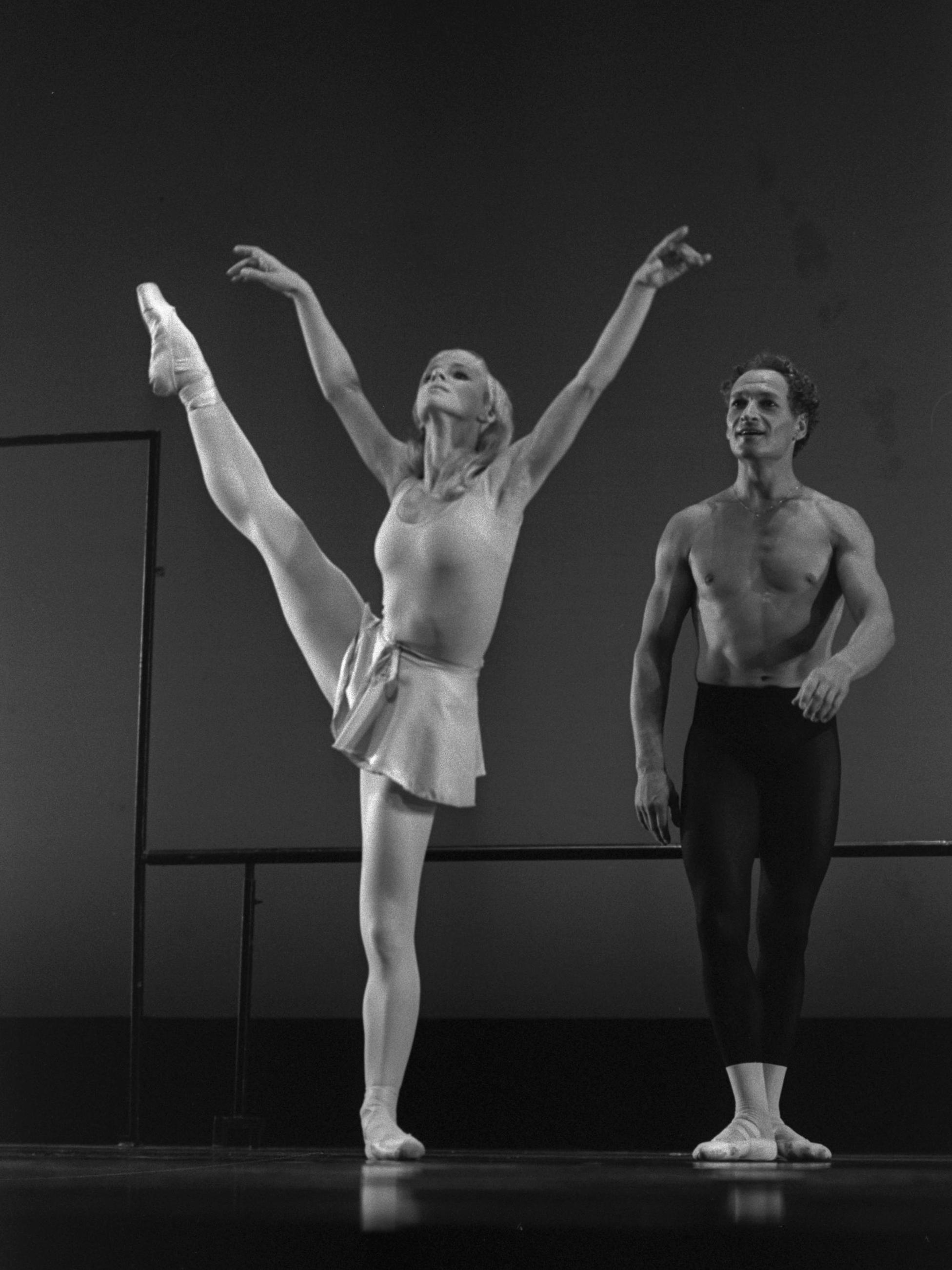
Celebrated Israeli ballet dancers, Valery and Galina Panov, who founded the Ballet Panov, in Ashdod.

Dance in Israel incorporates a wide variety of dance styles, from traditional Israeli folk dancing to ballet, modern dance, ballroom dancing and flamenco.

Contemporary dance in Israel has won international acclaim. Israeli choreographers, among them Ohad Naharin and Barak Marshall are considered among the most versatile and original international creators working today.

People come from all over Israel and many other nations for the annual dance festival in Karmiel, held in July. First held in 1987, the Karmiel Dance Festival is the largest celebration of dance in Israel, featuring three or four days and nights of dancing with 5,000 or more dancers and a quarter of a million spectators in the capital of the Galilee. Begun as an Israeli folk dance event, the festivities now include performances, workshops, and open dance sessions for a variety of dance forms and nationalities. Choreographer Yonatan Karmon created the Karmiel Dance Festival to continue the tradition of Gurit Kadman's Dalia Festival of Israeli dance, which ended in the 1960s.

Famous companies and choreographers from all over the world have come to Israel to perform and give master classes. In July 2010, Mikhail Baryshnikov came to perform in Israel.

== Folk dancing ==
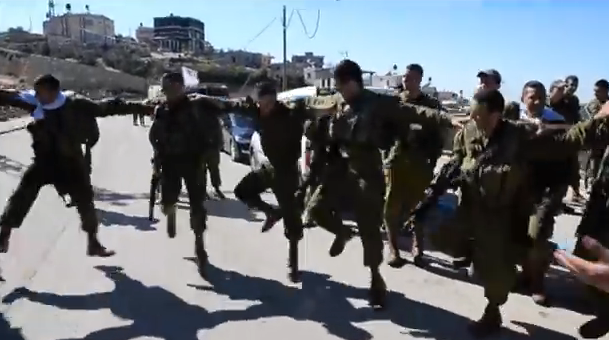
Israeli soldiers dancing the Dabka on the street

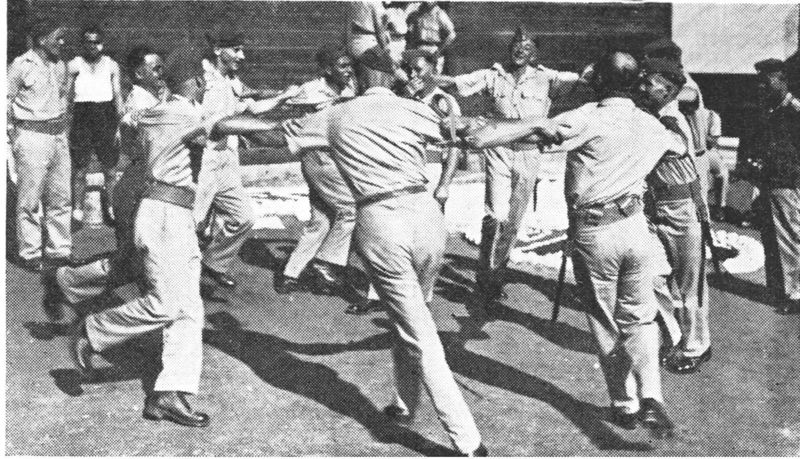
Israeli soldiers dancing the Horah in 1948.

Israeli folk dancing includes folk dances such as the Horah and dances that incorporate the Tza’ad Temani. Israeli folk dance also includes Dabke which is a Middle Eastern dance of the Levant region (Israel, Lebanon, Syria) and is a common dance done by mainly the Arab population of Israel however is a most popular dance among Israeli youth. In Hebrew Dabke is known as דבקה "Dabka" which comes from the Arabic term meaning "stomping of feet". The Dance is well suited for bringing Israel-Arab culture together.

== Contemporary dance ==
One of the pioneers of modern dance in Israel was Gertrud Kraus, who immigrated to Mandate Palestine in 1935 and formed a modern dance company affiliated with the Tel Aviv Folk Opera. In 1950–1951, she founded the Israel Ballet Theatre, and became its artistic director. Contemporary dance in Israel is influenced by Israeli folk dance and European traditions. Dance companies include the Kibbutz Contemporary Dance Company, Inbal Dance Theater, Vertigo Dance Company, Kolben Dance Company, Bat-Dor Dance Company and Batsheva Dance Company.

== Flamenco ==
In 2010, Silvia Duran, an Israeli flamenco dancer, was honored by King Juan Carlos I of Spain for training generations of flamenco dancers at her studio in Tel Aviv, The citation was awarded for her "contribution to the culture of Spain and the Spanish people.

== Dance festivals ==
The Karmiel Dance Festival has been a yearly event since 1987. The festival is usually held for 3 days and nights in July, and includes dance performances, workshops, and open dance sessions. The festival began as a celebration of Israeli folk dance, but today it features many different dance troupes, attracting thousands of dancers and hundreds of thousands of spectators from Israel and overseas. During the festival there are two major competitions: the Eyal ben Yehoshua choreography competition and a folk dance competition in memory of dancer Asheri Hever.

== Dance companies ==
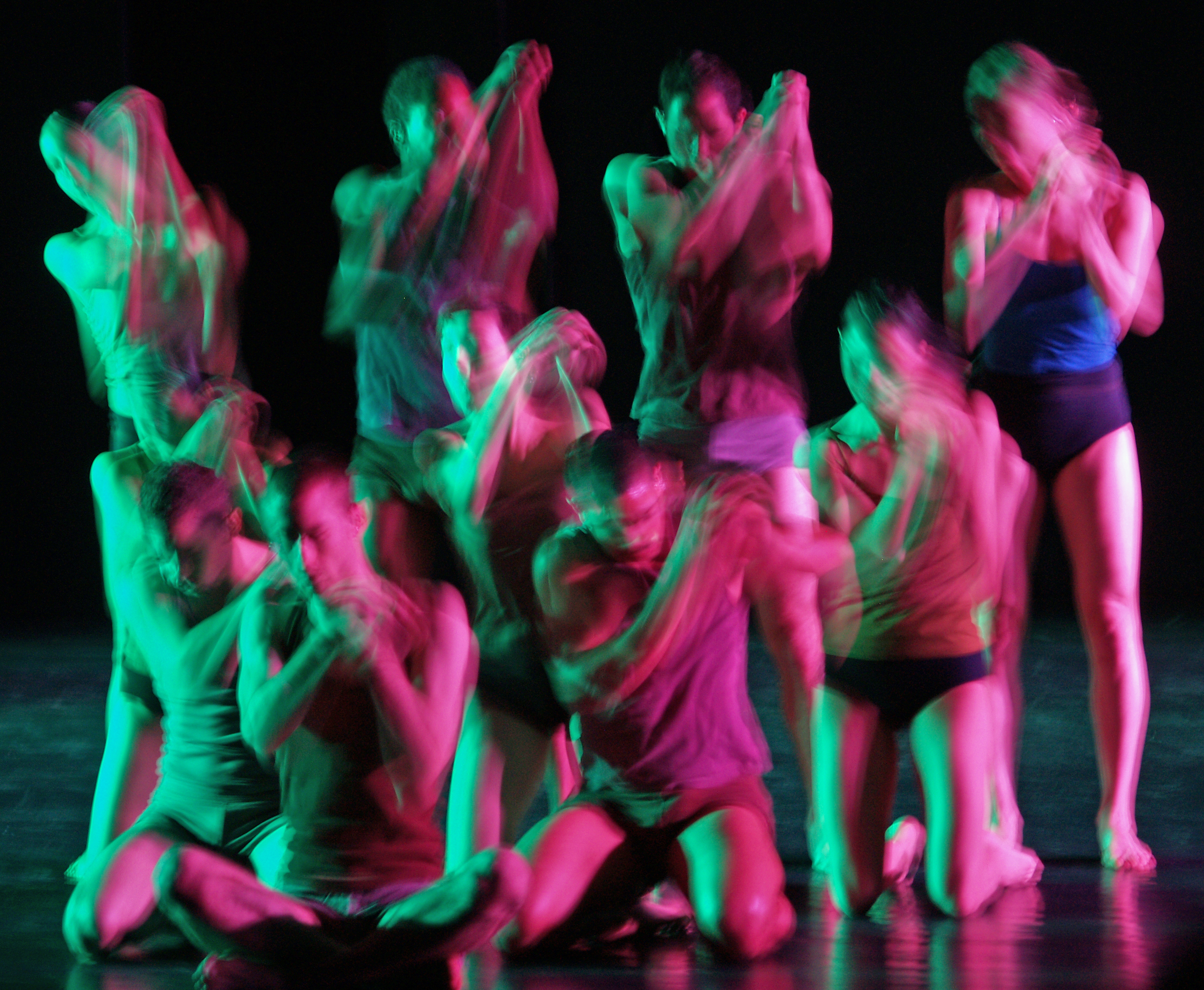
Batsheva Dance Company co-founded by Martha Graham and Baroness Batsheva De Rothschild in 1964

The Batsheva Dance Company is an internationally acclaimed dance company based in Tel Aviv. It was founded by Martha Graham and Baroness Batsheva De Rothschild in 1964. From its inception until 1979, the prima ballerina of Batsheva was Rina Schenfeld; she and Rena Gluck were the company's principal dancers for many years. Ohad Naharin has been artistic director since 1990.

The Bat-Dor Dance Company was an Israeli dance company co-founded by Baroness Batsheva de Rothschild and dancer Jeannette Ordman. Bat Dor made its debut in 1968 with Ordman as its leading dancer. The company existed until July 2006.

The Inbal Dance Theater focuses on the dance of ethnic communities in Israel, among them Yemenite Jews, Moroccan Jews, Iranian Jews and Kurdish Jews. The group is known for incorporating biblical themes and an ancient dance language into modern dance moves. The group was founded in 1949 by Sara Levi-Tanai, Jerusalem-born of a Yemenite family. The company is currently directed by Barak Marshal.

The Kibbutz Contemporary Dance Company, based in Kibbutz Ga'aton, participates in some 200 performances a year in Israel and overseas.

The Rina Schoenfeld Dance Theater, founded in 1978, developed an eclectic blend of Bauhaus ideology, theater, modern dance and ballet which used physical objects to "guide the imagination to places beyond dance."

The Israel Ballet, which performs classical and neo-classical ballets, was founded in 1967 by Berta Yampolsky and Hillel Markman. In 1975, the troupe performed George Balanchine's Serenade, bringing the company international acclaim. After watching a performance in New York, Balanchine granted the Israel Ballet permission to perform his works free of charge.

The Adama Dance Company, established by Liat Dror and Nir Ben Gal, is based in Mitzpe Ramon. The company has seven dancers and runs a children's dance school.

== Dance centers ==
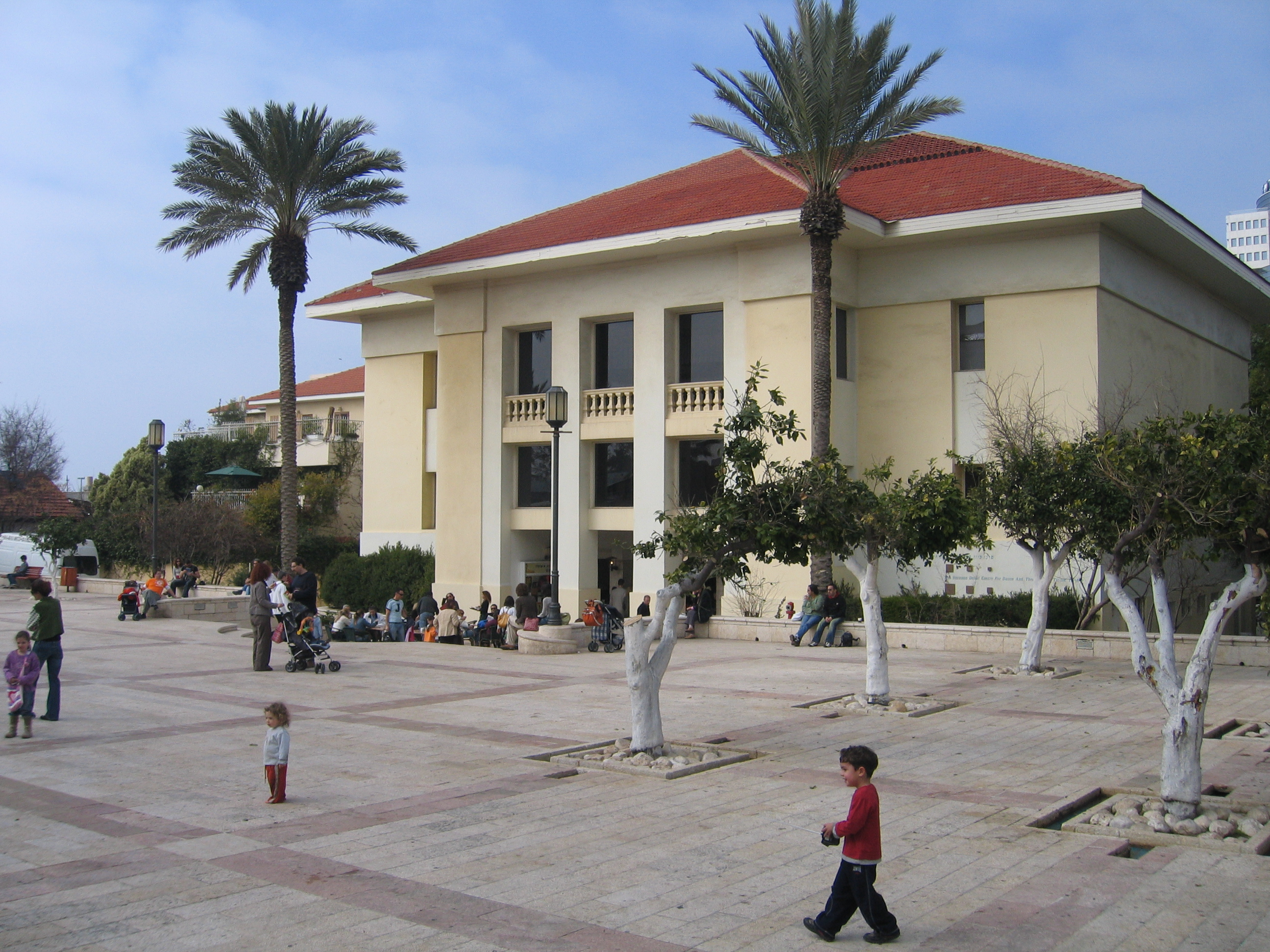
Suzanne Dellal Center, Tel Aviv

Tel Aviv's center for modern and classical dance is the Suzanne Dellal Center for Dance and Theater in Neve Tzedek.

== Dance notation ==
The Eshkol-Wachman Movement Notation is a notation system for recording movement on paper or computer screen created in Israel by dance theorist Noa Eshkol and Avraham Wachman, a professor of architecture at the Technion. The system is used in many fields, including dance, physical therapy, animal behavior and early diagnosis of autism.

== Gallery ==
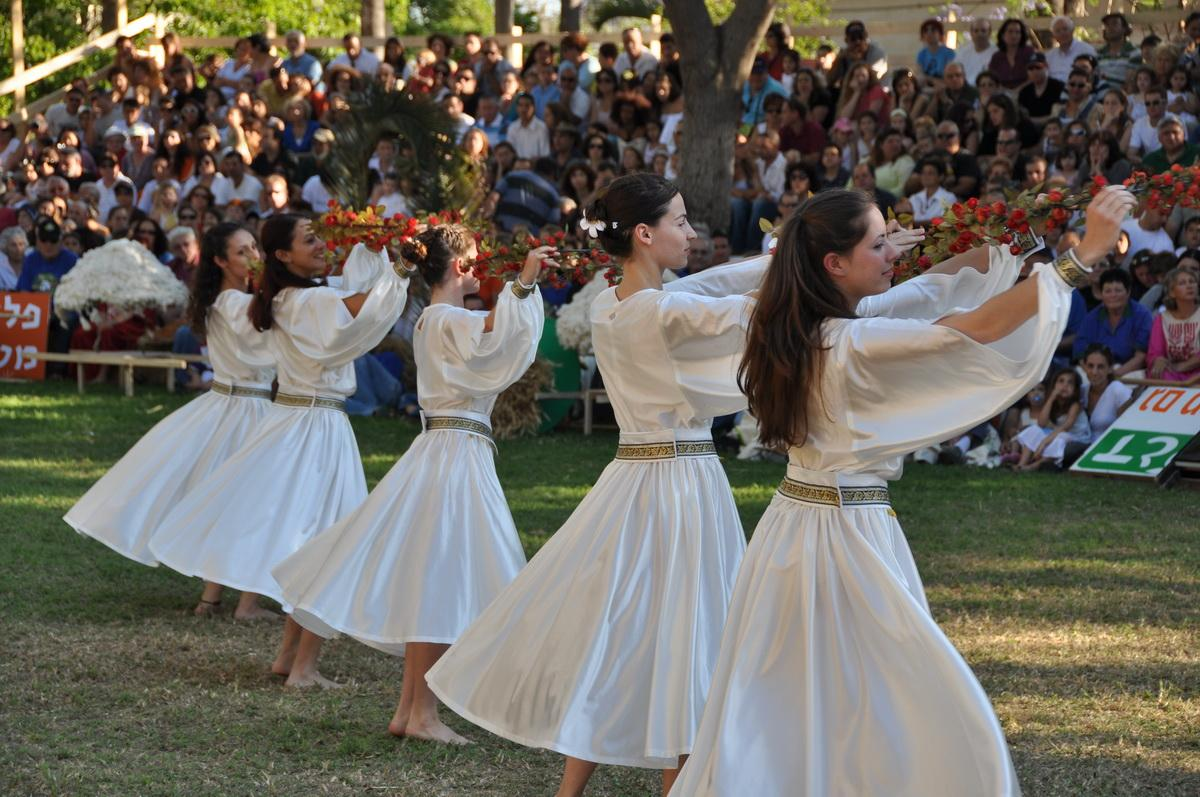
Israeli folk dancing on the Jewish holiday of Shavuot at Kibbutz Gan-Shmuel

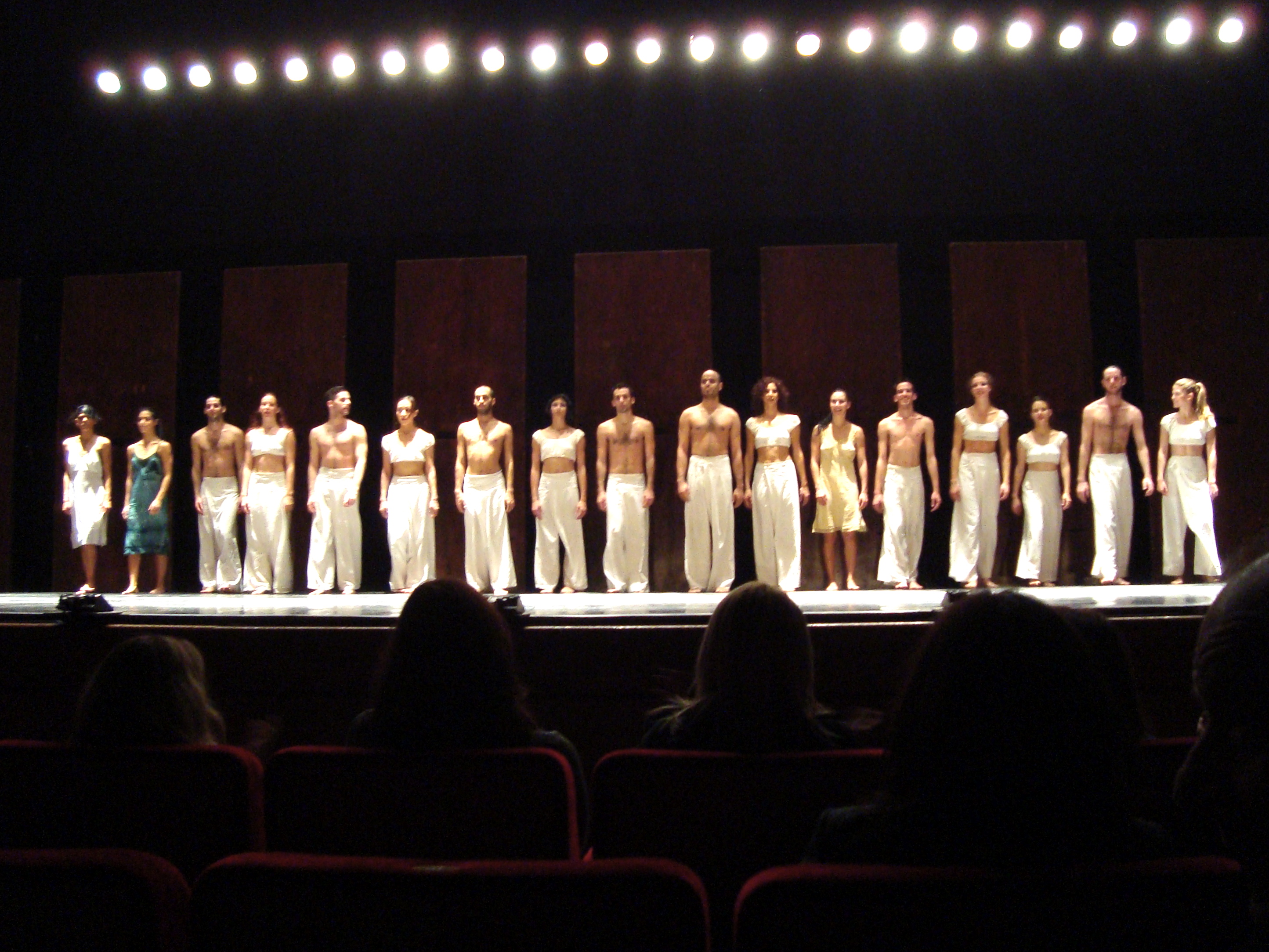
Kibbutz Contemporary Dance Company performing in Rome

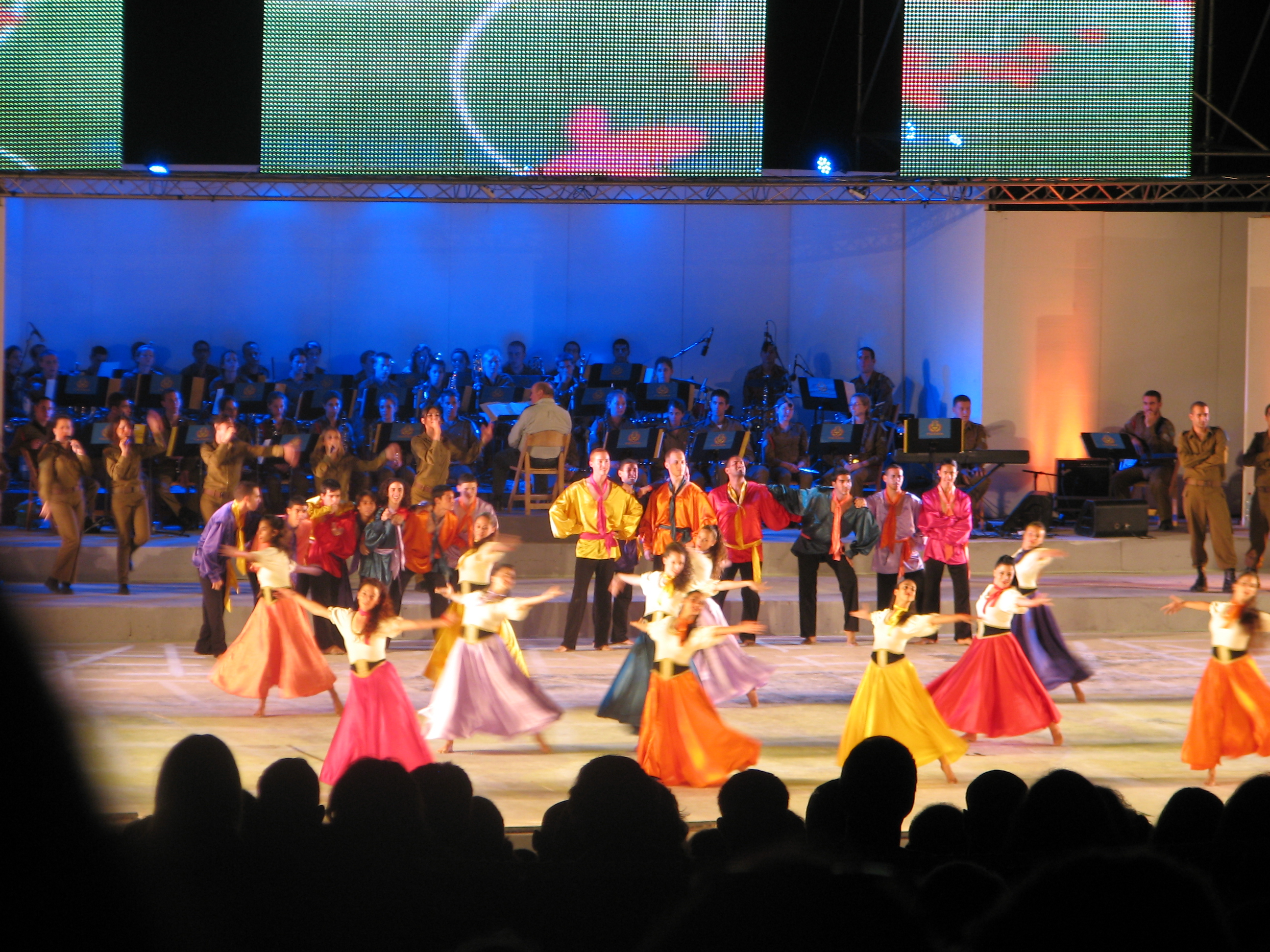
Karmiel Dance Festival, 2011

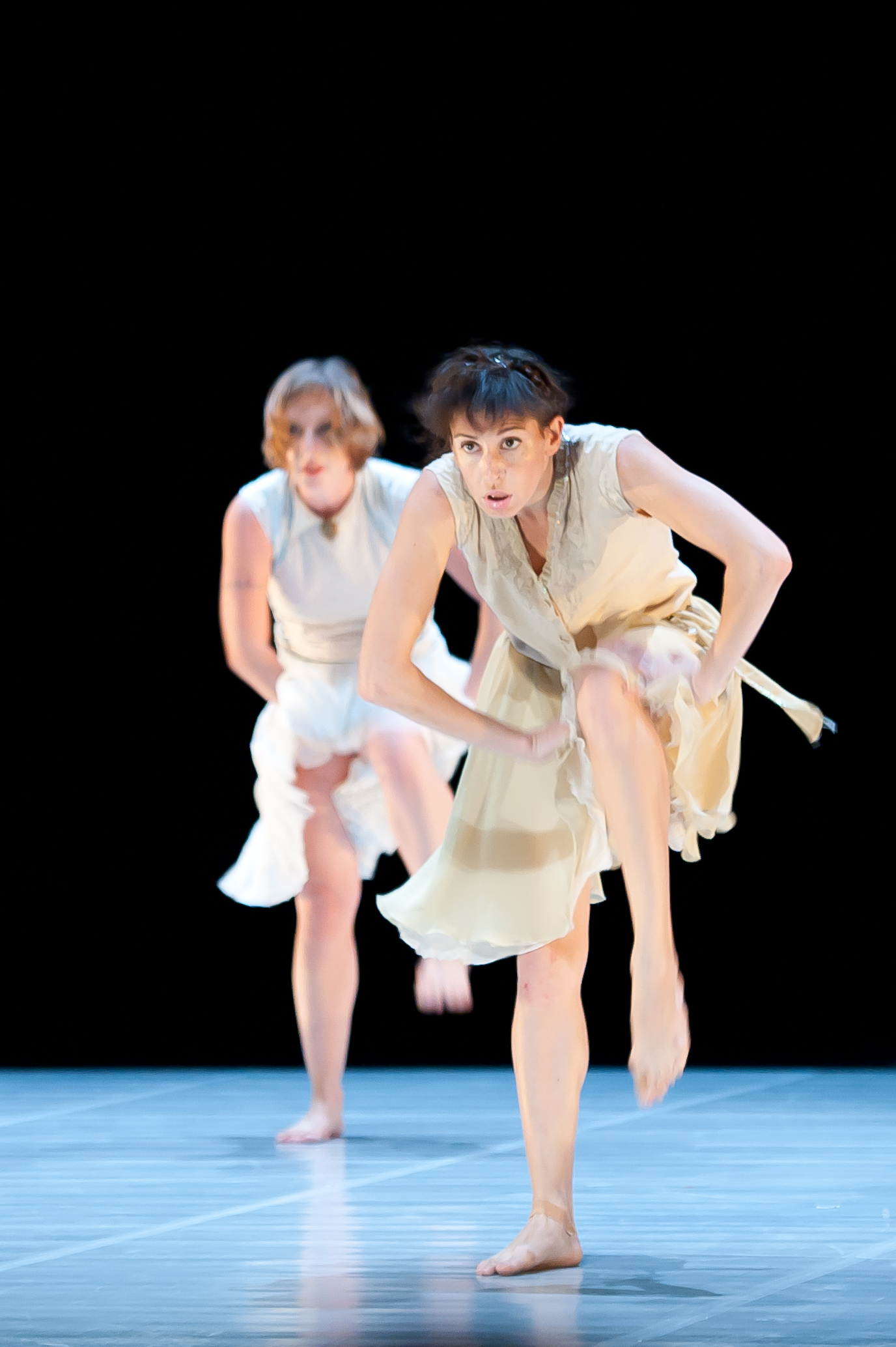
Israeli choreographer and dancer Inbal Pinto

== See also ==
- Baruch Agadati
- Culture in Israel
- Valery Panov
- Jerusalem Academy of Music and Dance
- Rokdim Im Kokhavim TV dance show
- Yaron Margolin
- L-E-V Company
