= Yehudit Arnon =

Israeli dancer and choreographer

- יהודית ארנון
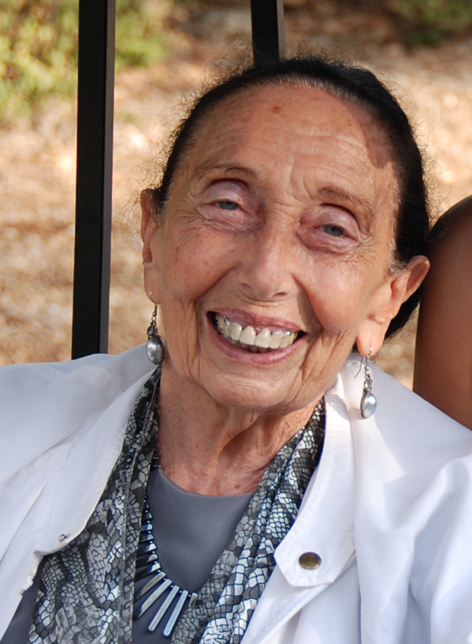
- Born: 15 October 1926; Komárno, Czechoslovakia
- Died: 17 August 2013 (aged 86); Kibbutz Ga'aton, Israel
- Occupations: Dancer, choreographer
- Known for: Founder of Kibbutz Contemporary Dance Company (KCDC)
- Awards: Israel Prize (1998)

Yehudit Arnon (Hebrew: יהודית ארנון; 15 October 1926 – 17 August 2013) was an Israeli dancer and choreographer.

== Biography ==
Yehudit Arnon was born on 15 October 1926 in Komárno, Czechoslovakia to Ludwig Schischa-Halevy and Elisabeth (Betty) Hoffmann. On 11 June 1944 Arnon and her parents were sent to Auschwitz. Upon arriving, she requested to stay with her sickly mother but instead was sent with the other young people to the Birkenau camp while her mother was sent to the gas chambers. She escaped the concentration camp in May 1945 when the Red Army arrived. After escaping, she reached Budapest and began teaching dance. There, she met Yedidya Ahronfeld, whom she married on 16 June 1946. The couple moved to Palestine in 1948, settling in Kibbutz Ga’aton, Israel where she lived until her death.

Arnon established the Kibbutz Contemporary Dance Company (KCDC) in 1970. She served as the artistic director and CEO until 1996. "In June 1997, Arnon received the Distinguished Artist Award of the International Society for the Performing Arts in recognition of her extraordinary contributions of creative talent and inspiration to the world of dance". Arnon was awarded the Israel Prize in 1998 which is Israel's highest award for her achievements in education and the performing arts during her lifetime.

Yehudit Arnon died on 17 August 2013, at 87 years of age.
