= Netiv HaLamed-Heh =

Netiv HaLamed-Heh: נתיב הל״ה (Hebrew)
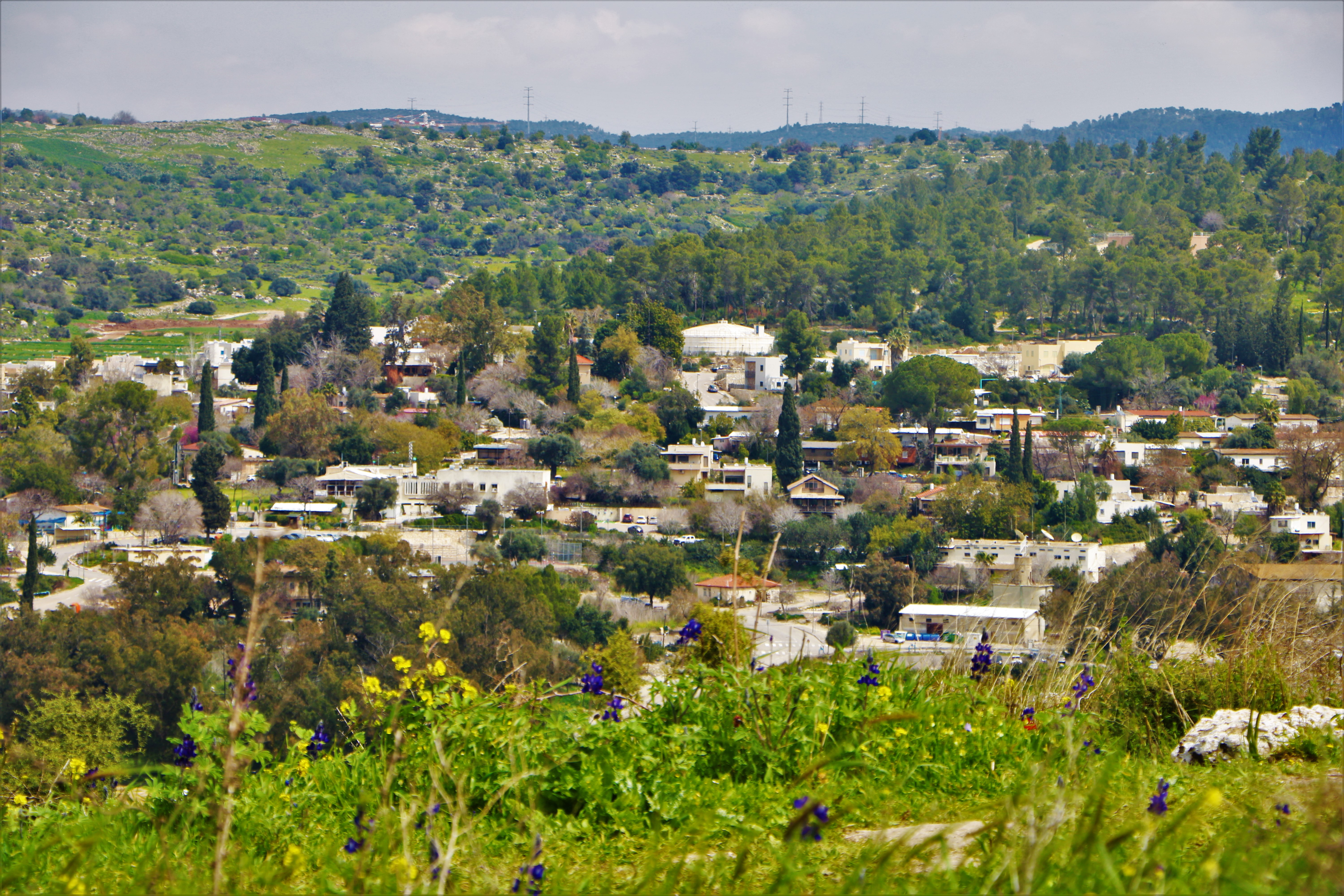
- Etymology: Path of the 35
- Location within Jerusalem District Location within Israel
- Coordinates: 31°41′16″N 34°59′1″E
- Country: Israel
- District: Jerusalem
- Council: Mateh Yehuda
- Affiliation: Kibbutz Movement
- Founded: 16 August 1949
- Founder: Demobilised Harel Brigade soldiers
- Population (2024): 682
- Website: www.netiv.org.il

Netiv HaLamed-Heh (Hebrew: נתיב הל״ה, lit. 'Path of the 35') is a kibbutz in central Israel. Located in the Valley of Elah, it falls under the jurisdiction of Mateh Yehuda Regional Council. In 2024 it had a population of 682.

== History ==
Netiv HaLamed-Heh was established on 16 August 1949 by demobilised soldiers on land that had previously belonged to the village of Bayt Nattif before the 1948 Arab-Israeli War. The soldiers had been members of the 4th Company of the Palmach's Harel Brigade, and the settlement was initially named Peled (an acronym for Pluga Daled, lit. Daled Company, daled being the 4th letter of the Hebrew alphabet). It was later renamed after the 35 Haganah soldiers killed in a convoy sent to resupply the Gush Etzion kibbutzim during the 1947–48 Civil War (Lamed-Heh is 35 in Hebrew numerals).

In 2007, the Vertigo Dance Company has established the Vertigo Eco-Art Village as an educational center for ecology and arts at Kibbutz Netiv HaLamed-Heh.

== Notable people ==
- Yiftah Ron-Tal (born 1956), major general of the IDF (retired), head of the Port Authority (2007–2010) and the Israel Electric Corporation (since 2010)
- Ya'akov Tzur (born 1937), former politician and government minister in the 1980s–1990s

== Gallery ==
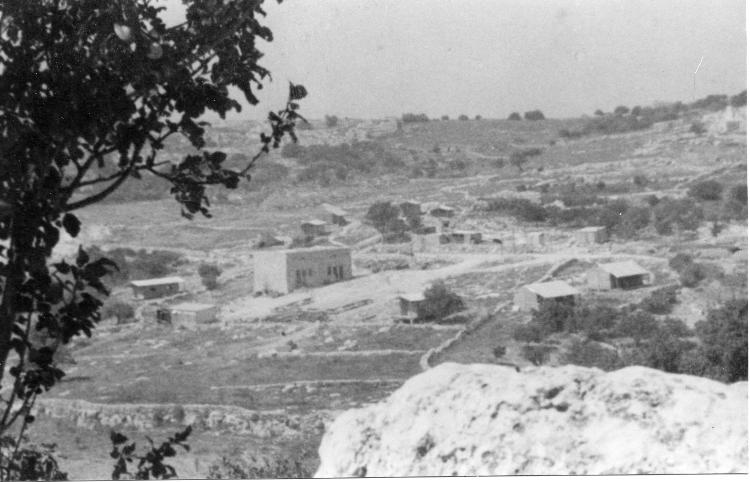
Nativ HaLamed-Heh, 1949

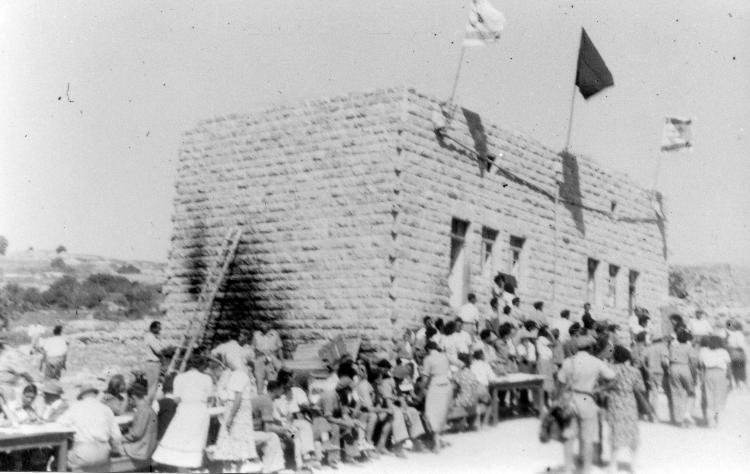
Inauguration ceremony, Nativ HaLamed-Heh, August 1949

== See also ==
- Khirbet Qeiyafa
- Dance in Israel
