= Margalit Oved =

American-Israeli dancer and choreographer (1930–2026)

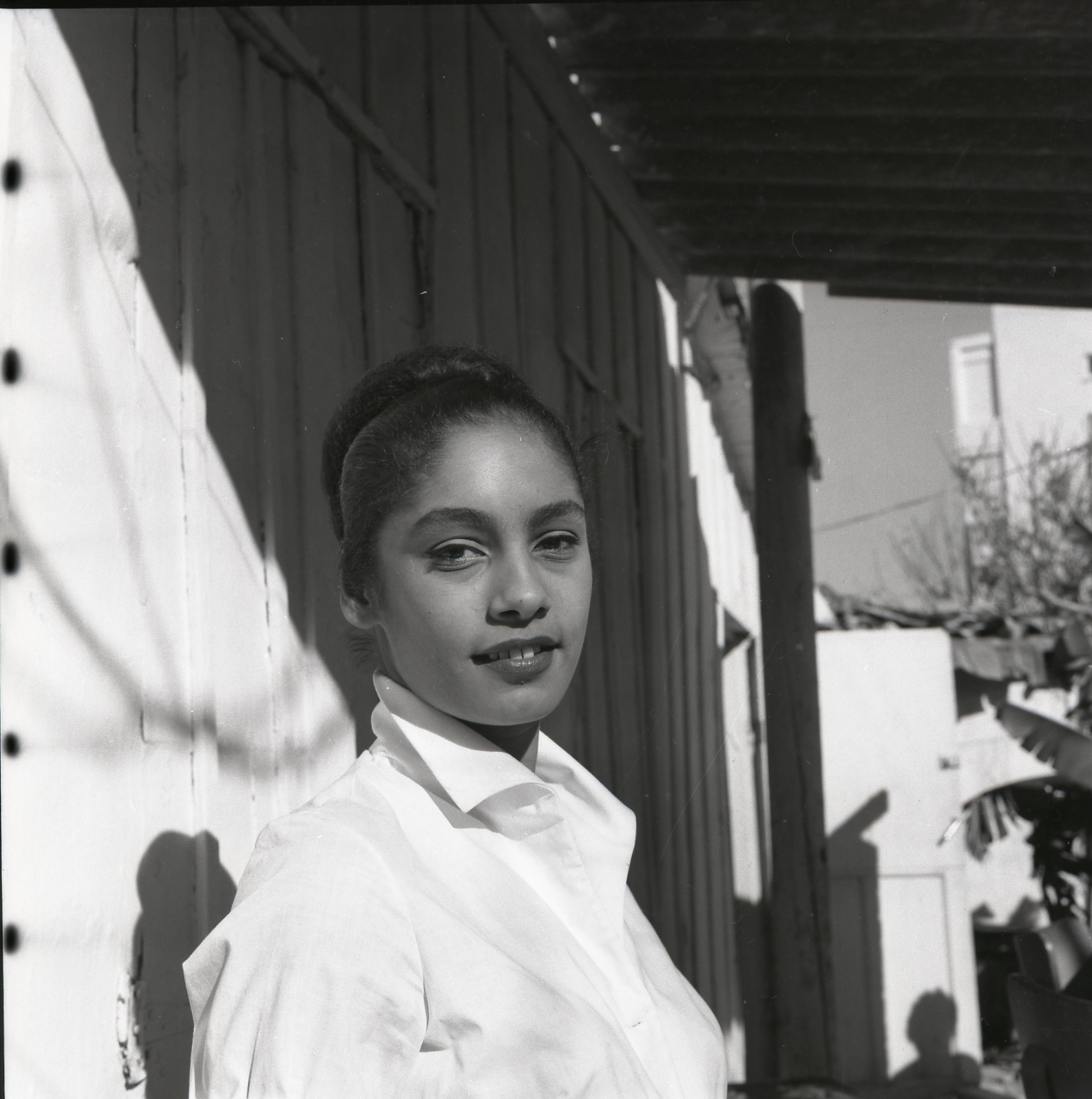
- Oved in 1952, photo by Boris Carmi
- Born: January 31, 1930; Aden Protectorate
- Died: February 4, 2026 (aged 96)
- Partner: Melvin Marshall
- Children: Barak Marshall
- Dancing career
- Current group: Margalit Dance Theatre Company
- Former groups: Inbal Dance Theater; Barak Marshall Theaterdance

Margalit Oved (Hebrew: מרגלית עובד; January 21, 1930 – February 4, 2026) was an American-Israeli dancer and choreographer, who was born in the Aden Protectorate. After being airlifted to Israel in 1949 in Operation Magic Carpet, she became involved with the Inbal Dance Theater for the following 15 years. She then moved to the United States, where she taught at University of California, Los Angeles. Oved later returned to the Inbal Dance Theatre, and also worked with her son's Barak Marshall Theaterdance. She also founded her own group, the Margalit Dance Theatre Company in Los Angeles.

== Early life ==
Margalit Oved was born in the Aden Protectorate on January 21, 1930, as the seventh of nine children. Her father was a pearl merchant, and her mother was a midwife. Although she was Jewish, Oved's mother chose to send her to the local Christian school as it provided the best education in the local area. While there she learnt to speak English, which added to her native Aramaic, Hebrew and Arabic. She was evacuated to Israel in 1949 via airlift as part of Operation Magic Carpet.

== Career ==
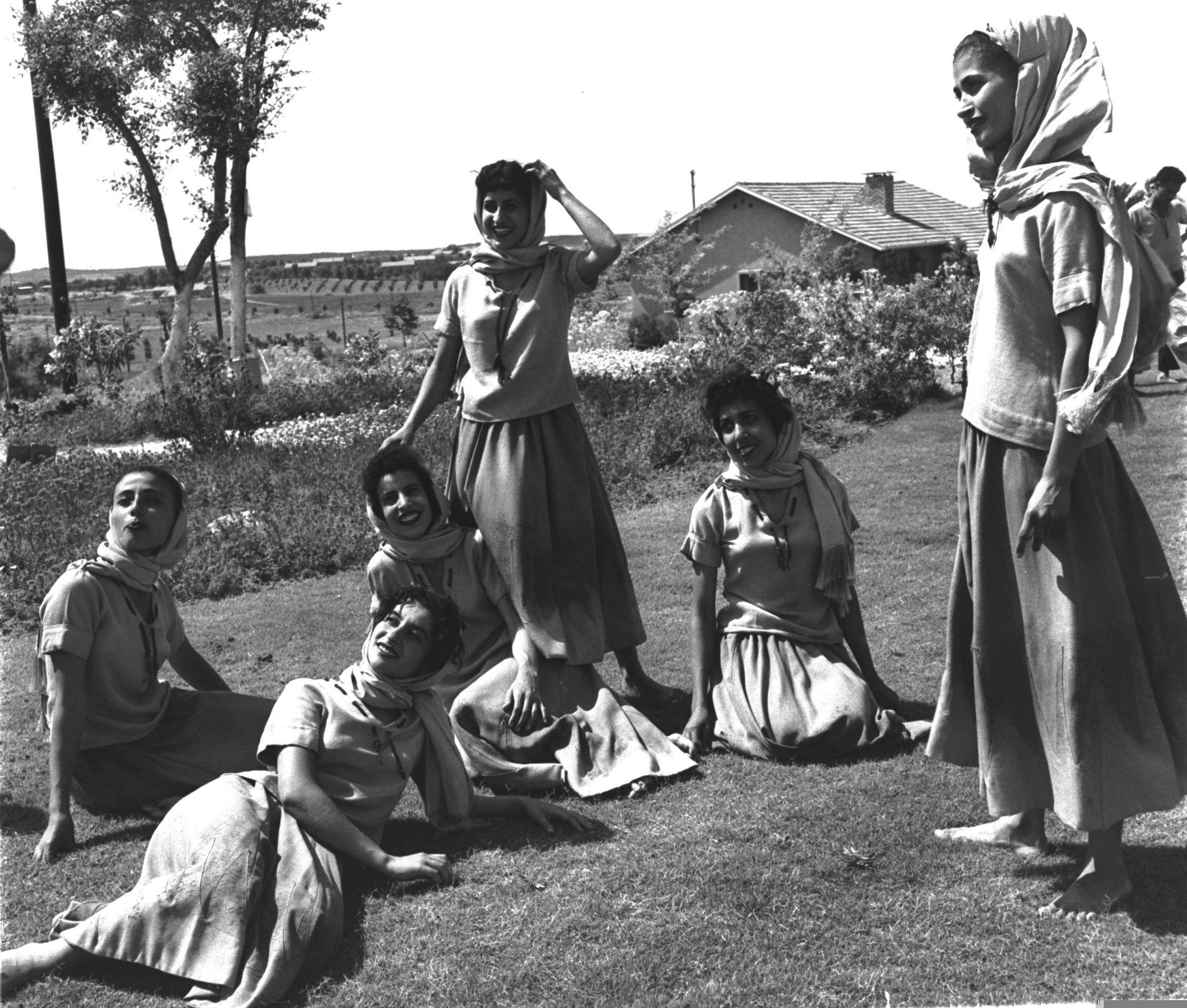
Members of the Inbal Dance Theater troupe, 1956

After arriving in Israel, she founded Beit Tarbut Lenoar, which was a cultural heritage organisation directed at children. The following year, she began working with the Inbal Dance Theater and Sara Levi-Tanai. Oved would go on to spend 15 years with the Theatre, choreographing dances based on the traditions of Yemen and other areas. Oved appeared in the first Israeli-produced film in 1955, entitled Hill 24 Doesn't Answer. She rose to the position of principal dancer with the Inbal Dance Theatre, before leaving in 1965, and settling two years later in Los Angeles, United States. There she met and married Melvin Marshall, and together had two sons.

Oved began teaching at the University of California, Los Angeles, while continuing to work on her own dances. In 1973, she created the dance Through the Gate of Aden, based on her own life so far. She also founded the Margalit Dance Theatre Company in the city. The group toured Israel in 1982, and performed at the Kennedy Center in Washington D.C. in 1988. Oved returned to Israel again in 1994, where she returned to work with the Inbal Dance Theater once again, along with her son Barak. He has since become an international choreographer alongside his mother. Following two years with the company, she left once again to join her son's Barak Marshall Theaterdance on an international tour.

== Death ==
Oved died on February 4, 2026, at the age of 96.
