= Yael Ron Ben-Moshe =

Israeli politician

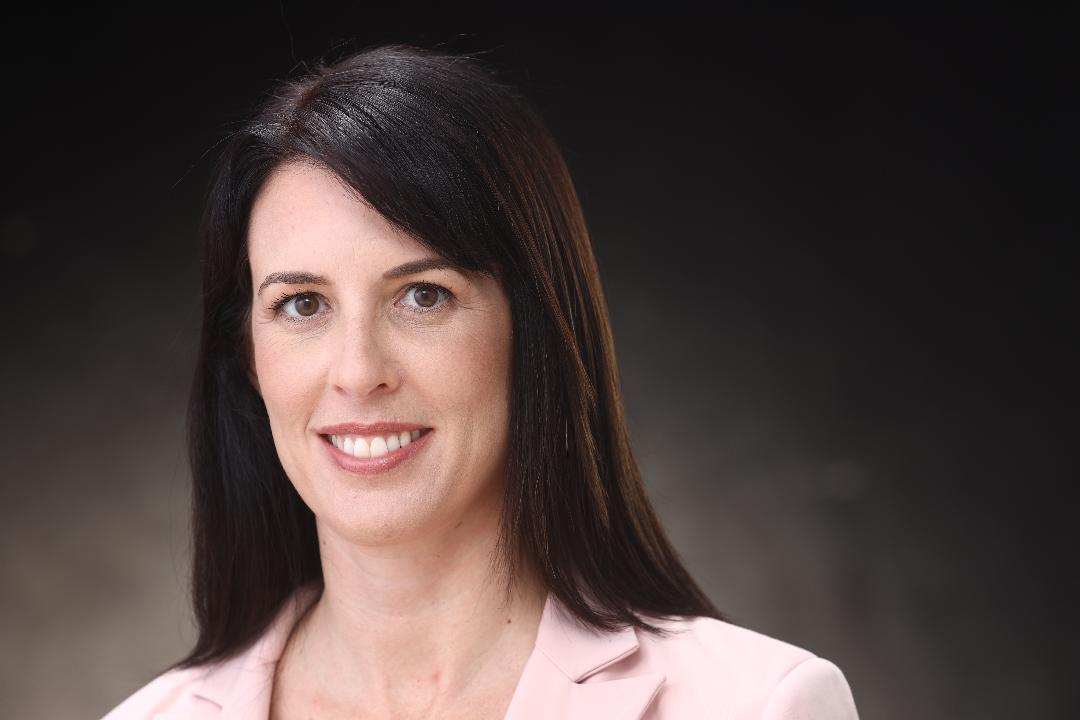
- Ron Ben-Moshe in 2021

Faction represented in the Knesset
- 2020–2022: Blue and White
- 2025–2026: Blue and White

Personal details
- Born: 14 November 1978 (age 48) Ga'aton, Israel

Yael Ron Ben-Moshe (Hebrew: יָעֵל רוֹן בֶּן מֹשֶׁה; born 14 November 1978) is an Israeli politician who served as a member of the Knesset for Blue and White from 2022 until 2022 and from 2025 until 2026.

== Biography ==
Born in kibbutz Ga'aton, Ron Ben-Moshe studied for bachelor's and master's degrees at Tel Aviv University. Married, with three children, she managed employment programmes for the Israel branch of the American Jewish Joint Distribution Committee and worked in the Prime Minister's Office. In 2015 she was appointed manager of a regional partnership of local authorities in the Western Galilee.

She was placed fortieth on the Blue and White list for the March 2020 elections. However, the alliance won only 33 seats. In November 2020 she was appointed CEO of the alliance. She entered the Knesset in December 2020 as a replacement for Ofer Shelah. She was re-elected to the Knesset in the March 2021 elections after being placed eighth on the Blue and White list.

For the 2022 elections Ron Ben-Moshe was placed fifteenth on the National Unity list (an alliance of Blue and White and New Hope), but lost her seat as it won only twelve seats.

Ron Ben-Moshe has previously submitted several legislative proposals, including a reform to encourage capital investment in agriculture, an amendment to the National Health Insurance Law aimed at reducing gaps between the periphery and central Israel, and legislation to promote capital investment in factories located near conflict zones.

During the 24th Knesset, MK Ben-Moshe initiated and advanced a series of amendments to the Enforcement Authority Law, aimed at reducing the financial burden on citizens with small debts. These efforts were partly motivated by numerous complaints regarding excessive toll collection on Highway 6 – Northern Extension. In parallel, as Chair of the Public Petitions Committee, she led efforts with government ministries to establish a centralized clearinghouse for toll payments and to re-evaluate the funding and operational model of Highway 6 in the north.

She rejoined the Knesset in July 2025, replacing Matan Kahana.

Ben-Moshe, as a member of the State Control Committee, voted in October 2025 in favor of creating a commission of inquiry on the 7 October attacks, though it was voted down.

She announced in August 2026 that she would leave the party, after Blue and White head Benny Gantz ruled out supporting Gadi Eisenkot as prime minister ahead of the 2026 Israeli legislative election.
