= Kibbutz Contemporary Dance Company =

Kibbutz Contemporary Dance Company (KCDC) is a dance company founded in 1970 by the Israel Prize laureate Yehudit Arnon, who was its artistic director until 1996. In 1980, the choreographer Rami Be'er joined the company and since then has been the artistic director and choreographer. The company's home is located at the International Dance Village, in Kibbutz Ga'aton in the western Galilee of northern Israel, and has become a center for performing arts and dance education for dancers and dance students from across the world. The Village is an institution for movement dance and contemporary dance for all ages, and includes the company's Zichri Theater, a performing arts center, dance studios, accommodation for students and professional dancers. It regularly hosts tourists from Israel and abroad.

The company performs year-round in some of the theaters and festivals worldwide, from the Sydney Opera House in Sydney, Australia, to the Kennedy Center in Washington, D.C.

The International Dance Village is home to the company's dance programs including the annual Kibbutz Summer Intensive taking place each July and August and open to dancers and dance students of high school and university age. Throughout the year, the company hosts a pre-professional 5-month study abroad program known as the Dance Journey program for dancers and dance students ages 18 years and up.

The International Dance Village is the home of the company and consists of a total of nearly 100 Israeli and international dance and dance students.

== History ==
The company was originally named the Inter-Collective Dance Company. At the time, all of its performers were members of the kibbutzim. Due to budgetary constraints and the company's commitment to creative independence, all of its productions were based on the choreography of Israeli artists. The group's performances were originally considered amateurish, both for their low production quality and the company's dependence on local artists. During its early years, the company's performers included Yehudit Arnon, Ofra Achmann, Hada Oren and Oshra Elkaym-Ronen. Arnon and Achmann frequently performed Ausdruckstanz, a form of expressive dance that remained popular in Israel until the mid-1950s.

In 1994, a second company joined the Kibbutz Company, called Kibbutzit 2, which mostly performs for young audiences, with performances such as Peter and the Wolf, The Animal Carnival, K-butzit 360 and Sipurei Kodemkol.

Some of the company's choreographers, including Shay Peartush, Etai Peri and Lotem Regev, participated in the Israeli TV show Nolad Lirkod (Born to Dance). The choreographers Liat Dror and Nir Ben Gal, who married shortly after their Israeli military service, began their careers in the company.

== Repertoire ==
- Aide Mémoire (1994)
- Butterflies (2001)
- Screensaver (2002)
- Clip Trip (2003)
- Foramen Magnum (2004)
- Upon Reaching the Sun (2005)
- Ekodoom (2006)
- To Whom it My Concern (2007)
- Power of Attorney (2007)
- 60 Hertz (2008)
- 360° (2009)
- Infared (2009)
- Transform (2010)
- Bein Kodesh Le'hol (2011)
- Sipurei Kodemkol (2012)
- If At All (2012)
- Undivided Void (2013)
- Lullaby for Bach (2015)
- Horses in the Sky (2016)
- Mother's Milk (2017)
- Asylum (2018)
- A Good Citizen (2019)
- TA_ATUA (Delusion) (2021)

== See also ==
- Dance in Israel
- Culture of Israel
- Vertigo Dance Company
- Inbal Dance Theater
