= Leah Goldberg =

Israeli poet (1911–1970)

- לאה גולדברג
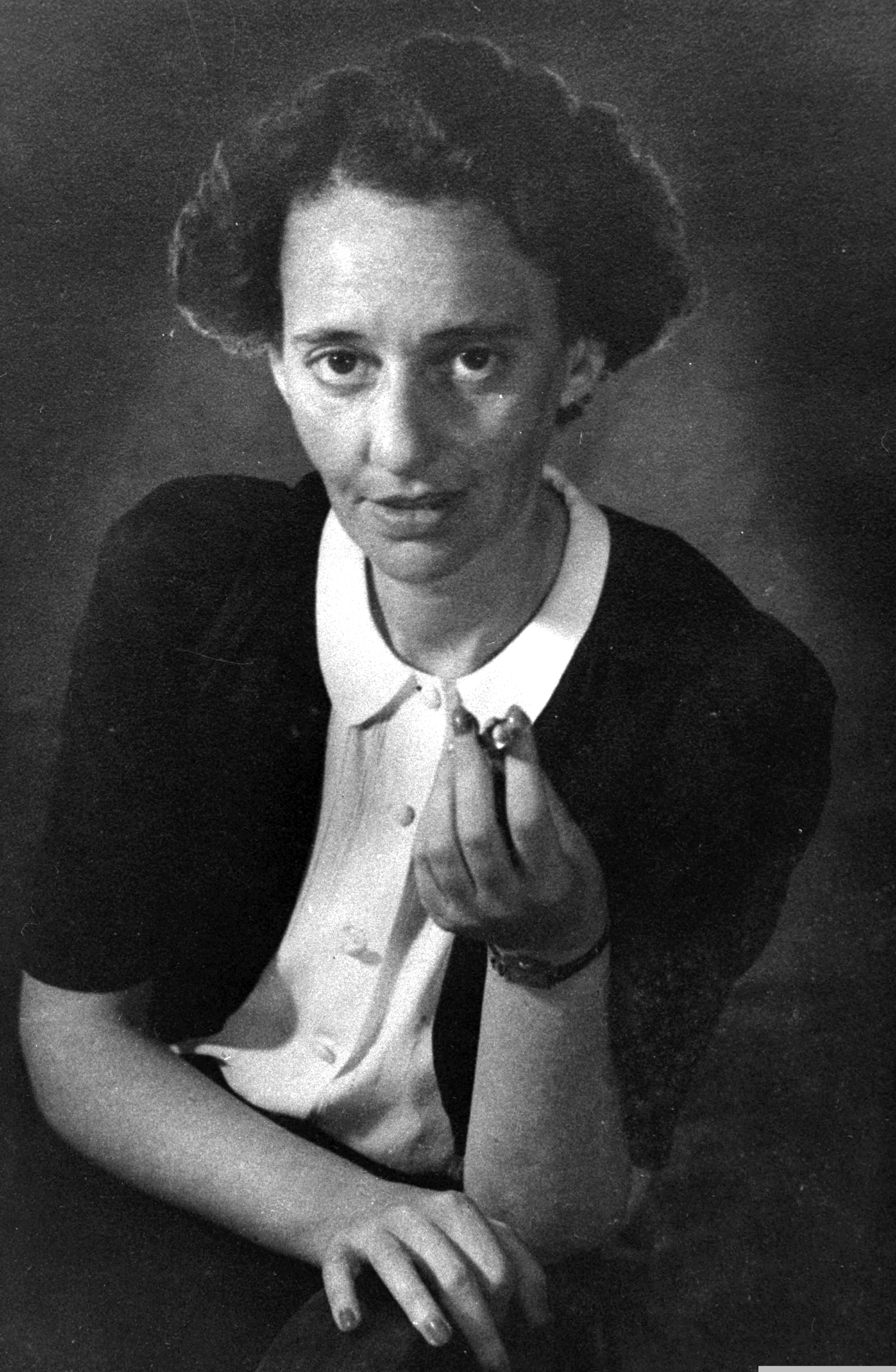
- Leah Goldberg in 1946
- Born: May 29, 1911; Königsberg, German Empire (now Kaliningrad, Russia)
- Died: January 15, 1970 (aged 58); Jerusalem, Israel
- Occupations: poet, translator, playwright, researcher of literature
- Writing career
- Literary movement: Yakhdav (led by Avraham Shlonsky)

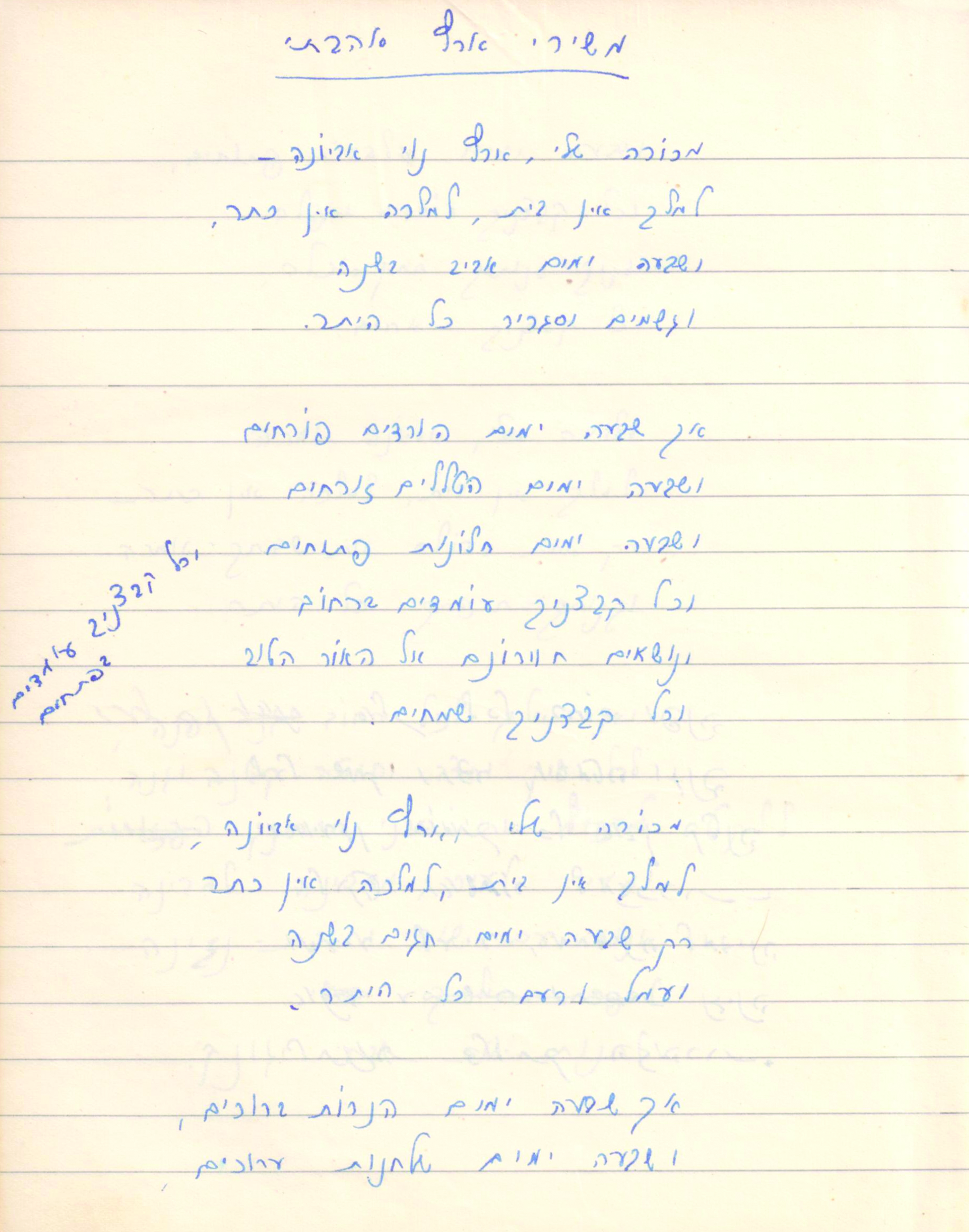
Songs of My Beloved Country - Draft, handwriting of Leah Goldberg

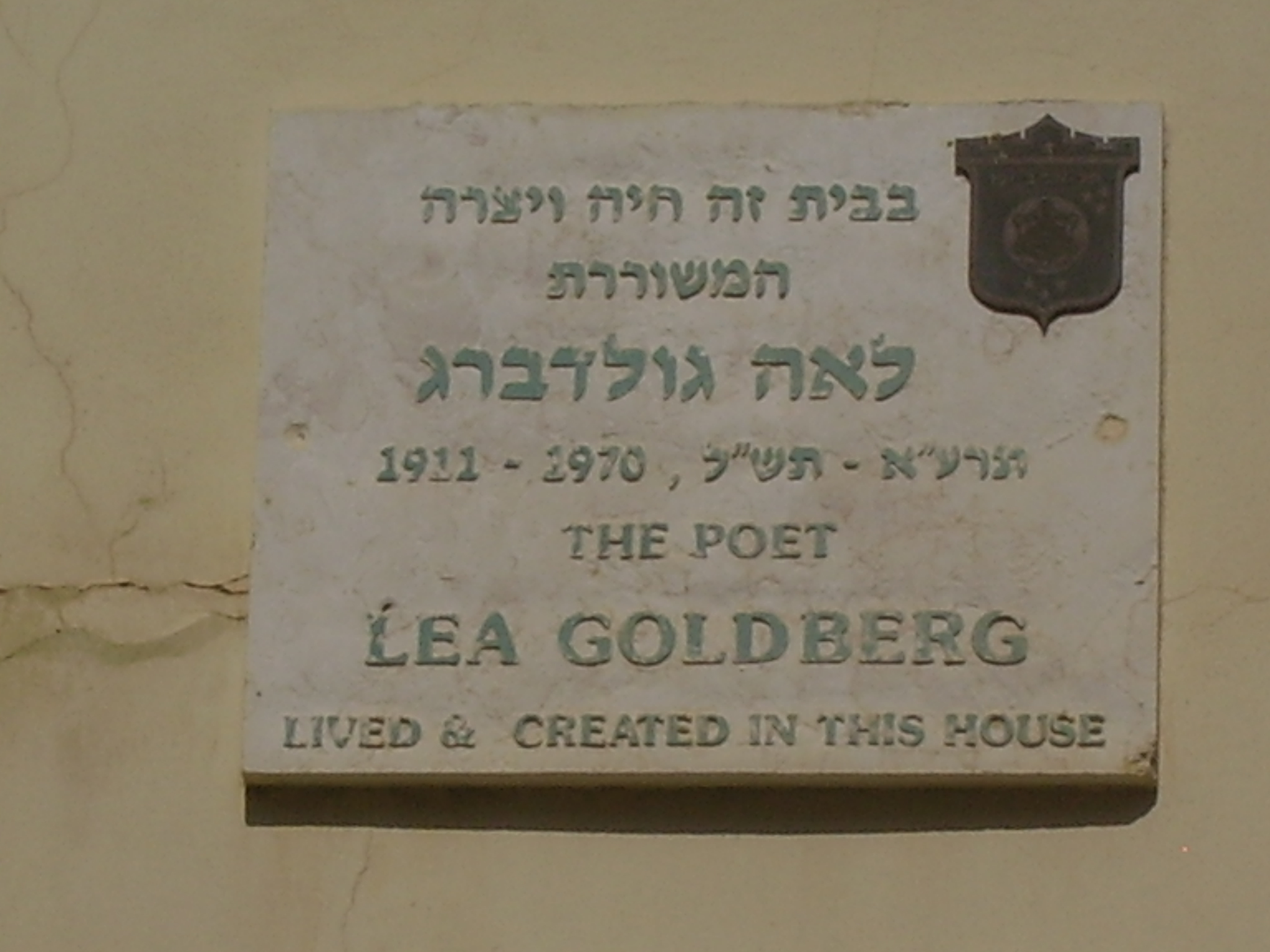
Memorial plaque on Leah Goldberg's house in Tel Aviv

Leah Goldberg or Lea Goldberg (Hebrew: לאה גולדברג; May 29, 1911, Königsberg – January 15, 1970, Jerusalem) was a Hebrew-language poet, author, playwright, literary translator, illustrator, painter, and comparative literary researcher.

Her writings are considered classics of Israeli literature.

== Biography ==
Leah Goldberg was born to a Jewish Lithuanian family from Kaunas, however her mother traveled to the nearby German city of Königsberg (today, Russian Kaliningrad) in order to give birth in better medical conditions. When asked about her place of birth, Goldberg often stated "Kaunas" rather than Königsberg.

When the First World War broke out, three-year-old Goldberg had to escape with her parents to the Russian Empire, where they spent a year in hard conditions. In Russia, her mother gave birth to a baby boy, Immanuel, who died before reaching his first birthday.

When the family traveled back to Kaunas in 1919, a Lithuanian border patrol stopped them and accused her father of being a "Russian spy." They tortured Goldberg's father by preparing his execution every morning for 10 days and repeatedly cancelling it at the last moment. When the border guards finally let the family go, Goldberg's father's mental state had deteriorated. He eventually lost his ability to function normally and left Kaunas and his family to receive treatment, though it is unclear what his fate was and why he never returned to his family. Goldberg and her mother became very close and lived together until Leah Goldberg's death.

Goldberg's parents spoke several languages, though Hebrew was not one of them. However, Goldberg learned Hebrew at a very young age, as she received her elementary education in a Jewish Hebrew-language school. She began keeping a diary in Hebrew when she was 10 years old. Her first diaries still show limited fluency in Hebrew and the influence of the Russian language, but she was determined to write in Hebrew and mastered the language within a short period of time. Even though she was fluent and literate in various European languages, Goldberg wrote her published works, as well as her personal notes, only in Hebrew. In 1926, when she was 15 years old, she wrote in her personal diary, "The unfavourable condition of the Hebrew writer is no secret to me [...] Writing in a different language than Hebrew is the same to me as not writing at all. And yet I want to be a writer [...] This is my only objective."

Goldberg received a PhD from the Universities of Berlin and Bonn in Semitic languages and German. Her dissertation on the Samaritan Targum was supervised by Paul E. Kahle. Her erudition and renown was such that a leading newspaper in Palestine excitedly reported her plans to immigrate to that country. In 1935, she settled in Tel Aviv, where she joined a group of Zionist Hebrew poets of Eastern European origin known as Yachdav (Hebrew: יחדיו "together"). This group was led by Avraham Shlonsky and was characterised by adhering to Symbolism, especially in its Russian Acmeist form, and rejecting the style of Hebrew poetry that was common among the older generation, particularly that of Haim Nachman Bialik.

She never married and lived with her mother, first in Tel Aviv and later in Jerusalem. Goldberg was a heavy smoker, and in her late years she became aware of smoking's negative health effects, as reflected in her poem "About the Damage of Smoking." In the spring of 1969, she was diagnosed with breast cancer. After removing one of her breasts, her physicians were optimistic. Goldberg went on a short visit to Switzerland, but returned in poor physical condition, as the cancer spread through her body. She died on January 15, 1970. Goldberg received the Israel Prize posthumously. Her mother accepted the prize in her name.

== Literary career ==
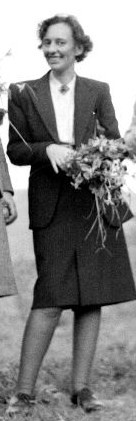
Leah Goldberg (1964)

Goldberg earned a living as a high school teacher and advertising copywriter until she was hired as an editor by the Hebrew newspapers Davar and Al HaMishmar. She also worked as a children's book editor at the Sifriyat Po'alim publishing house, while also writing theatre reviews and literary columns. In 1954 she became a literature lecturer at the Hebrew University of Jerusalem, advancing to senior lecturer in 1957 and full professor in 1963, when she was appointed head of the university's Department of Comparative Literature.

Goldberg wrote Hebrew poetry, drama, and children's literature. Goldberg's books for children, among them Room for Rent and Miracles and Wonders (ניסים ונפלאות, nisim veniflaot), have become classics of Hebrew-language children's literature.

Goldberg also translated literary works from Russian, Lithuanian, German, Italian, French, and English into Modern Hebrew. Of particular note is her magnum opus of translation, Tolstoy's epic novel War and Peace, as well as translations of Rilke, Thomas Mann, Chekhov, Akhmatova, Shakespeare, and Petrarch, plus many other works including reference books and works for children.

=== And This is the Light ===
In 1946, Goldberg published her only novel, the semiautobiographical And This is the Light (Hebrew: והוא האור, Vehu Ha'Or, "And he is the light"; "it is the light"; "this is the light").

Set in the summer of 1931, the novel depicts twenty-year-old protagonist Nora Krieger visiting her Lithuanian hometown while on holiday from her university studies in Berlin. Although she has planned to show how mature she has become, Nora instead experiences unrequited love, bad memories, and limits imposed on her by a classist and antisemitic society.

In 2011, The Toby Press released Barbara Harshav's English translation of the novel.

=== Room for Rent ===
In 1948, Goldberg wrote an Israeli children's short story and poem entitled Room for Rent (Hebrew: דירה להשכיר, Dira Lehaskir, "Flat for Rent"), which is based on an Eastern European folktale and was first published in Hebrew in the periodical Mishmar LaYladim.

The short story takes place in a five-story house that is home to four animals: a Cornish Hen on the first floor, a Cuckoo on the second, a black Cat on the third, and a Squirrel on the fourth. Sir Reginald Mouse lived on the fifth floor but recently moved out.

The four remaining tenants, who also happen to be friends, decide to rent out the fifth room and wait for a new neighbor to move into it.

Four animals show up at the house, and although they find the room nice, they offend the tenants with their reasons for not moving in: the hardworking Miss Ant dislikes Miss Hen for being fat and lazy; the motherly Mrs. Rabbit despises the Cuckoo for abandoning her sons in other birds' nests despite her visiting them daily; the white-skinned Snortimus Pig gets chased out for refusing to be neighbors with the black-furred Cat; and the musical Nightingale complains that the Squirrel is noisy whenever she cracks the pecans she shares with her friends.

Lastly, a kind Dove arrives at the house and inspects the room. When asked if she wants to stay, the Dove agrees, for she wishes to be friends and neighbors with Miss Hen, the Cuckoo, the Cat, and the Squirrel despite their habits.

Considered a classic in Israeli literature, Room for Rent is commonly read to children to convey themes of tolerating diverse people's races, beliefs, and practices, and of friendship transcending differences.

In 1959, Room for Rent was republished as a children's book with illustrations by Shoshana Heiman, reportedly as a reaction to the Wadi Salib riots during which Israelis of Middle Eastern descent protested against racist government officials and discrimination.

In 1970, Room for Rent was again republished as a children's book with new illustrations by Shmuel Katz.

In the 1990s, Room for Rent was first translated into English by Bracha Kaplan as A Flat for Rent.

In 2016, Ilan Greenfield of Jerusalem-based Gefen Publishing House commissioned San Antonio native Jessica Setbon to retranslate Room for Rent into English; the new English version of Goldberg's children's book was released in 2017 along with Katz's illustrations.

On March 19, 2020, former Israeli president Reuven Rivlin uploaded a YouTube video of himself narrating Room for Rent.

== Literary style and influences ==
Goldberg was widely read in Russian, German, and French literary circles. Symbolism and Acmeism were strong influences on her style. Her poetry is notable for coherence, clarity, and an emphasis on ideas over baroque forms. Nili Gold, Modern Hebrew Literature scholar and editor of the English translation of And This is the Light, has noted Goldberg's "high aestheticism, musicality, and unique merging of intellect and humanity."

Goldberg's poetics perceive the general in the specific: a drop of dew represents vast distances and the concrete reflects the abstract. Her poetry has been described as "a system of echoes and mild reverberations, voices and whispers" that recognizes the limitations of the poem and language. Her work is minor and modest, taking a majestic landscape like the Jerusalem hills and focusing on a stone, a thorn, one yellow butterfly, and a single bird in the sky.

Unlike many of her contemporary peers, most notably Nathan Alterman, Goldberg avoided outright political poetry and did not contribute occasional poetry to Hebrew periodicals with overt current-affairs discourse.

== Acclaim and remembrance ==
In 1949, Goldberg received the Ruppin Prize (for the volume "Al Haprikhá") and, in 1970, the Israel Prize for literature.

The American Hebraist, Gabriel Preil, wrote a poem about Goldberg entitled "Leah's Absence."

In 2011, Goldberg was announced as one of four Israeli poets who would appear on Israel's currency, alongside Rachel Bluwstein, Shaul Tchernichovsky, and Alterman.

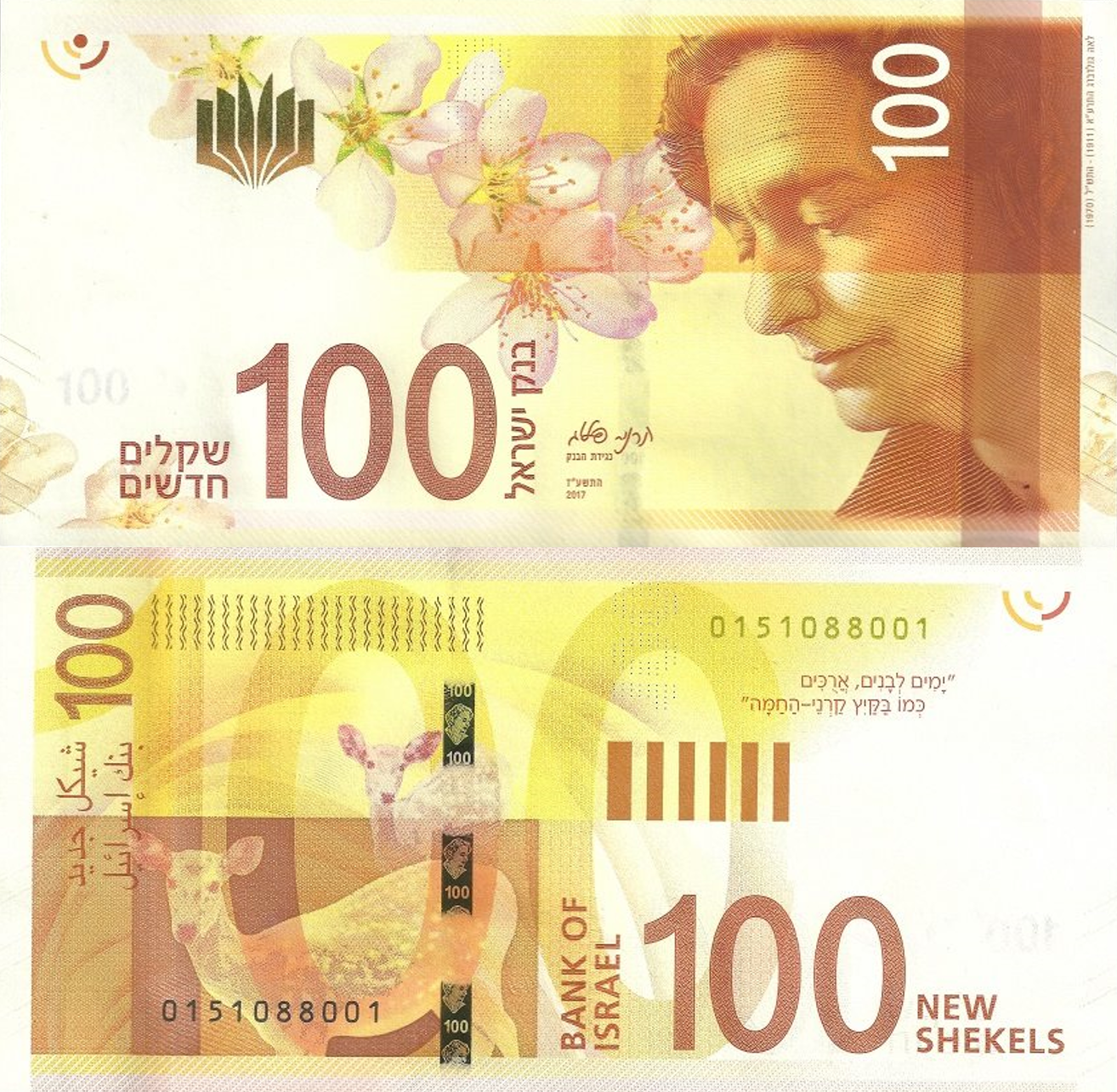
A 100-shekel bill featuring the image of Leah Goldberg.

The design of the 100 new shekel banknote includes the portrait of Leah Goldberg and her poem "In the land of my love, the almond tree blossoms" in microprint.

On May 29, 2013, Google commemorated what would have been Goldberg's 102nd birthday by uploading a Google Doodle in which the website's logo is made up of the characters and setting from her children's book Room for Rent.

Many of Goldberg's songs, including those written before the establishment of the State of Israel, have been performed and recorded over the years.

== See also ==
- Hebrew literature
- Culture of Israel
- List of Israel Prize recipients
- List of Hebrew-language authors

== Relevant literature ==
- Yeglin, Ofra. "The Sonnets of Lea Goldberg." Hebrew Studies 50, no. 1 (2009): 265-276.
- Yeglin, Ofra. "From the Songs of Zion: Lea Goldberg." In Routledge Handbook on Zionism, pp. 331-341. Routledge, 2024.
- Ticotsky, Giddon. "Ekphrasis as Encryption: Lea Goldberg in Berlin." Prooftexts: A Journal of Jewish Literary History 34, no. 1 (2014): 1-52.
- Ticotsky, Giddon. "Vera Europa vs. Verus Israel: Modern Jews' Encounter with Europe in Light of Lea Goldberg's Encounter with a Poet." The German-Hebrew Dialogue: Studies of Encounter and Exchange 6 (2017): 105-120.
- Yeglin, Ofra. "Ulay mabat aher: klasiyut modernit u-modernizm klasi be-shirat Lea Goldberg [Perhaps Another Gaze: Modern Classicism and Classical Modernism in the Poetry of Lea Goldberg]." Tel Aviv: Hakibbutz Hameuchad (2002).
- Yeglin, Ofra. "Perhaps with Different Eyes: Modern Classicism and Classical Modernism in Lea Goldberg's Poetry." Tel Aviv: Hakibbutz Hameuchad-Porter Insti-tute for Poetics and Semiotics.[Hebrew] (2002).
- Back, Rachel Tzvia. "Toward the “Whole Fragment”: A Reading of Lea Goldberg's The Remains of Life." Nashim: A Journal of Jewish Women's Studies & Gender Issues 25 (2013): 114-128.
- Grumberg, Karen. "Gothic Temporalities and Insecure Sanctuaries in Lea Goldberg's The Lady of the Castle and Edgar Allan Poe's. “Masque of the Red Death”." Comparative Literature 68, no. 4 (2016): 408-426.
- Schachter, Allison. "Orientalism, Secularism, and the Crisis of Hebrew Modernism: Reading Leah Goldberg's 'Avedot'." Comparative Literature 65, no. 3 (2013): 345-362.
