= Shmuel Katz (artist) =

Israeli artist, illustrator and cartoonist

Shmuel Katz שמואל כ"ץ
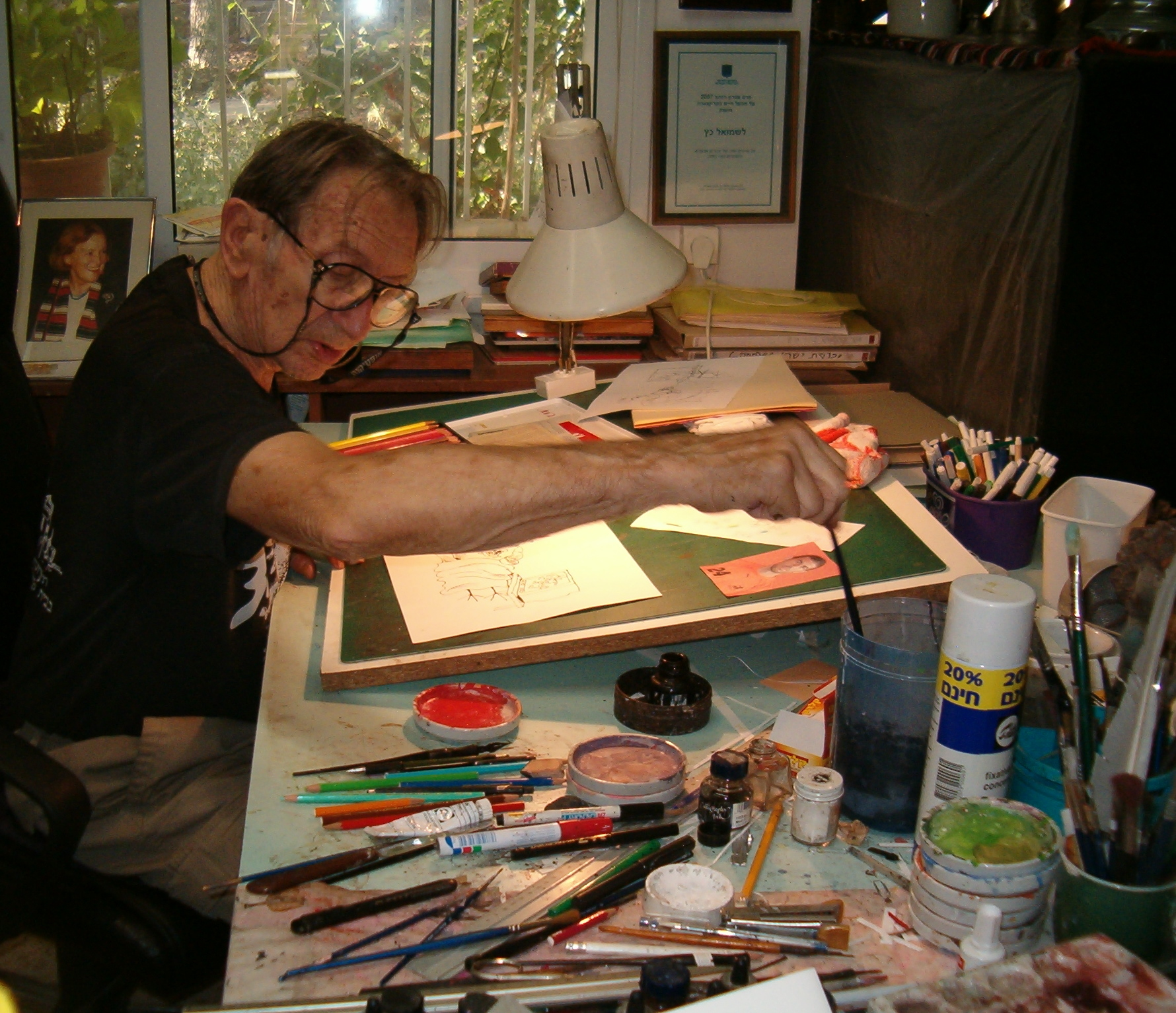
- Born: Shmuel Alexander Katz; August 18, 1926; Vienna, Austria
- Died: March 26, 2010 (aged 83); Nahariya, Israel
- Education: Budapest University of Technology and Economics
- Style: Graphics designer
- Spouse: Naomi
- Children: 2

Shmuel Katz (Hebrew: שמואל כ"ץ; August 18, 1926 – March 26, 2010) was an Israeli artist, illustrator, and cartoonist. A Holocaust survivor and postwar immigrant to Mandate Palestine via the detention camps on Cyprus, he figured prominently in Israeli illustration and newspaper cartooning, widely exhibiting and publishing his drawings and paintings at home and abroad, for which he won numerous local and international awards. His sketches and watercolors are known for their sprightly lines and touches of humor.

== Biography ==
Shmuel Alexander (Sandor) Katz was born in Vienna, Austria, to parents of Hungarian origin. Following the Anschluss, Austria's annexation by Nazi Germany in March 1938, the family relocated to Hungary. He attended school, studied the piano, and became a member of the Zionist youth movement HaNoar HaTzioni. After the Nazi invasion of Hungary in 1944, he was deported to a forced labor camp in Yugoslavia from which he escaped to Budapest where he was among the thousands of Jews hidden in the "Glass House" shelter operated by Swiss diplomat Carl Lutz, until the arrival of the Soviet Red Army in mid-February 1945.

In Budapest, Katz joined the youth movement Hashomer Hatzair. He began studying architecture there in the Budapest University of Technology and Economics. In 1946, in the framework of the Aliyah Bet illegal immigration, he sailed aboard the Knesset Israel which was apprehended by the British and its passengers interned in a detention camp on Cyprus.

In 1947, Katz secured a legal immigration certificate as a member of the "First of May" nucleus group of Hashomer Hatzair. The group did its pioneering training at Kibbutz Eilon on the Lebanese border, and on October 8, 1948, became the founders of Kibbutz Ga'aton in the Western Galilee, where Katz spent the rest of his life. He designed the kibbutz dining room whose interior features Hungarian folkloristic wood carving.

== Art career ==
During the years 1950–1953 Shemuel Katz illustrated Mishmar Layeladim, the weekly children's supplement to the Mapam party's newspaper, Al HaMishmar. In 1953–1954, he enrolled in the École nationale supérieure des Beaux-Arts in Paris, France, where he studied lithography, copperplate etching, fresco, and music, and toured the lands of Western Europe. In 1955, he joined the editorial board of Al HaMishmar as illustrator and graphics editor. In 1958, he traveled through East Africa, a journey whose impressions influenced his artistic and technical style and led to the 1962 publication of A Journey to the Land of Kush together with author Nathan Shaham. In 1976 he visited Iran, and the following November in Tehran exhibited artworks featuring Iran and Jerusalem. In 1979, Katz paid two visits to Egypt with the "Autonomy" delegation and was granted a private interview with Egyptian president Anwar Sadat. In 1983, he visited Hungary as a member of a delegation from Peace Now.

Shemuel Katz's artworks have been exhibited extensively in Israel and abroad. His watercolors of Jerusalem have been reproduced as posters and postcards. His courtroom sketches of Adolf Eichmann's trial in Jerusalem, 1961, are held in the art collection of Yad Vashem, Israel's Holocaust Remembrance Authority. As an artist in the IDF, he sketched soldiers on guard and at war. Katz is well known as the illustrator of hundreds of books, especially for Sifriat Poalim, the Kibbutz Artzi movement's publishing house. Especially popular are his illustrated classics of Israeli children's literature, such as Igeal Mozinsohn's Hasamba series and poet Leah Goldberg's Room for Rent, whose cover art was used for a postage stamp.

Katz published editorial cartoons and illustrations in the Israeli dailies Al HaMishmar, and Maariv, the weekly kibbutz supplement of the mass-circulation Yedioth Aharonoth, as well as the Swiss satirical periodical, Nebelspalter.

Katz died at a hospital in Nahariya at the age of 83. He is survived by his wife Naomi and two daughters. His daughter Yael is married to politician Dov Khenin.

== Awards and honors ==
- 1959 – Medal at the International Exhibition of Book Art, Leipzig, Germany
- 1961 – First prize in Drawing and Watercolor of the Biennale for Young Artists, Paris, France
- 1974 – Nordau Prize for Art, Tel Aviv, Israel
- 1985 – Nachum Gutman Memorial Award of the Tel Aviv municipality
- 1997 – International Award for Caricature, Budapest, Hungary
- 2006 – "Dosh" Memorial Award for Caricature, Einav Center, Tel Aviv
- 2007 – First "Golden Pencil" Award of the Israeli Museum of Caricature and Comic Art, Holon, Israel
