= Yiftah Ron-Tal =

Israeli officer and director (born 1956)

- יפתח רון-טל
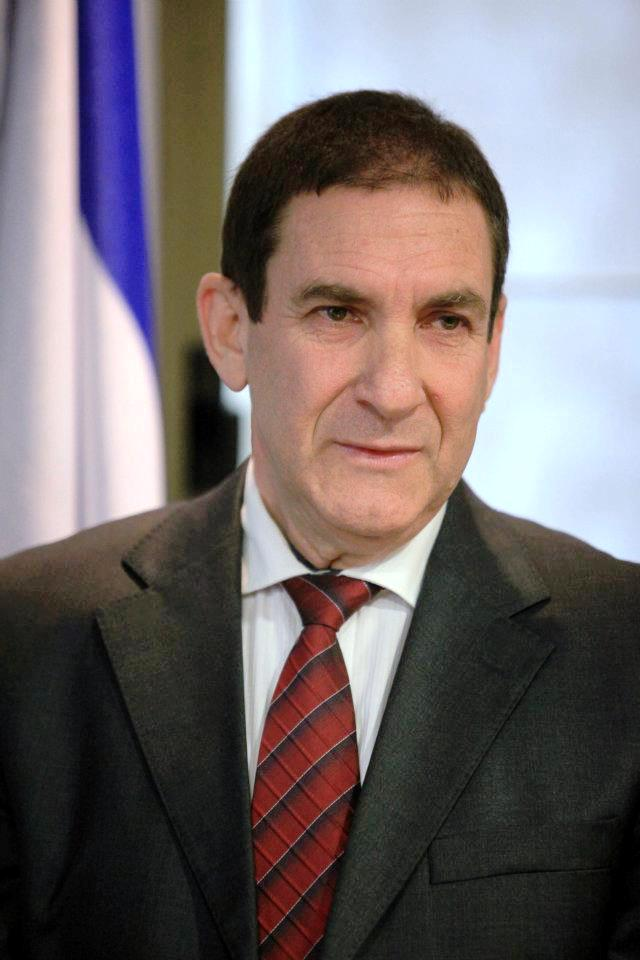
- Born: 1956 (age 69–70); Netiv HaLamed-Heh, Israel
- Occupations: Director of the Israel Electric Corporation, Former Head of the Israel Port Authority, Former Major General in the IDF

Yiftah Ron-Tal (Hebrew: יפתח רון-טל; born 1956) is the director of the Israel Electric Corporation, former head of the Israel Port Authority and former major general in the Israel Defense Forces (IDF).

== Biography ==
Ron-Tal was born on Netiv HaLamed-Heh, a kibbutz in the Elah valley in central Israel.

Drafted in 1974 into the Israeli Armored Corps, he became commander of the IDF Ground Forces Command.

After leaving the military, Ron-Tal headed the Israel Port Authority and, as of 2011, he was serving as head of the Israel Electric Corporation.

== Controversy ==
On October 4, 2006, he said publicly that IDF Chief of Staff Dan Halutz should accept responsibility for malfunctions in the Israel-Hezbollah War and accept the consequences. He hinted that Israeli PM Ehud Olmert should do the same.

"Those who directed this war must take responsibility," Ron-Tal said on Israel Radio, "We did not win this war, and it is proper that those who directed it should take responsibility".

He also said that employing the IDF to evacuate settlers from the Gaza Strip Israeli Settlements in 2005 was a grave mistake because it had seriously degraded the army's combat capabilities. Following these remarks, he was discharged from the IDF while on leave after 33 years of service, two months prior to retirement. The Israeli media reported though that Ron-Tal had sent a letter of resignation prior to being fired.

While the comments themselves were not the most vitriolic heard since the end of the Israel-Hezbollah war, Ron-Tal was roundly criticized for making them while still in uniform. Even though Ron-Tal was on a final leave of absence before leaving the army, orders state that active soldiers are forbidden from giving interviews to the media without permission from the IDF Spokesperson's Unit, especially resenting opinions about the army and politics. He was the second general officer to criticize Halutz while in uniform over the war, the first being Ilan Harari.

In a previous controversial interview in 2003, he had advocated the liquidation of PLO chairman Yasser Arafat.
