= Ilan Harari =

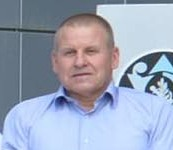

llan Harari (Hebrew: אילן הררי; January 7, 1959) is a retired Israel Defense Forces brigadier general who served as chief education officer of the Education and Youth Corps.

Harari served in various combat positions, including a command position in the Nahal Brigade and as a battalion commander in the Golani Brigade. On September 22, 2006, he announced his retirement and stated that Israel had lost the Lebanon War. General Yiftah Ron-Tal voiced the same opinion. Israel's Chief of Staff Dan Halutz disputed this assessment.

As head of a project to identify acts of heroism during the war, Harari said: "We heard about the complaints, the difficulties, the confusion, but in all that, there are plenty of heroic tales ... and these should be elevated so that every division in the IDF knows what happened there..."
