= Vertigo (dance company) =

Vertigo is an Israeli modern dance company. It was established by Noa Wertheim and Adi Sha'al in Jerusalem in 1992. The company's first performance was a duet featuring Wertheim and Sha'al called Vertigo. Following the group's appearances in various festivals in Israel and around the world, Vertigo has received recognition, positive reviews, and several awards from professionals and local and international audiences. The group mainly presents works by Wertheim, but it also showcases pieces by independent choreographers from within and outside the company. The company's studios are at the Gerard Behar Center in Jerusalem and at Kibbutz Netiv HaLamed-Heh, where it established an ecological arts village in 2007. Vertigo's main focuses are modern dance, Contact Improvisation and the classic ballet technique.

The Vertigo Dance Company is funded by the Jerusalem Municipality and the division of modern dance in the Ministry of Culture and Sport's Culture Authority.

Vertigo founders Wertheim and Sha'al both serve as the company's head director and artistic director. Wertheim was born in 1965 in the United States. In 1990, she graduated from the Rubin Academy of Music and Dance in Jerusalem. While studying at the academy, she became a member of the Jerusalem modern dance group Tamar, where she met Sha'al, whose professional dance experience included the Batsheva Ensemble and the Kibbutz Dance Workshop. Wertheim and Sha'al later married and today have three children.

== Performers ==
Inbal Alony, Rina Wertheim-Koren, Alon Karniel, Rut Valensi, Zak Vladimir, Dory Aben, Tomer Navot, Gil Karar, Eyal Vizner, Yuval Lev, Yael Tsibolski, Riki Veron, Anat Yaffe, Alex, Ron Cohen, Sandra Brown, Marija Slavec, Emmy Wielunski, Micha Amos, Itai Peri, Dorit Talpaz, Nitsan Moshe, Reut Shaibe, Sian Olles, Ran Bagno.

== Works ==
- Vertigo by Noa Wertheim (1992)
- Contact Lenses by Noa Wertheim (1993)
- Simbozia by Noa Wertheim (1994)
- Bordimino by Noa Wertheim (1997)
- Red Cow by Neta Pulvermacher (1998)
- Hamsin by Noa Wertheim (1998)
- Stringman by Gabor Goda and Noa Wertheim (1999)
- The Fish's Happiness by Rami Levi (2000)
- Esther by Noa Wertheim (2000)
- Power of Balance by Adam Benjamin (2001)
- Saluya by Noa Wertheim (2002)
- Birth of the Phoenix by Noa Wertheim (2004)
- Vertigo and the Diamonds by Noa Wertheim (2005)
- Sunny Side Up by Roberto Oliven (2006)
- White Noise by Noa Wertheim (2008)
- Roxy by Elad Shehter, Rina Wertheim-Koren and Alex Schmork (2009)
- Mana by Noa Wertheim (2009)
- Nul by Noa Wertheim (2011)
- Reshimo by Noa Wertheim (2014)
- Pardes by Noa Wertheim (2021)
- Makom by Noa Wertheim (2023)

== See also ==
- Culture of Israel
- Inbal Dance Theater
- Dance in Israel
- Noa Dar Dance Group
