= Inbal Dance Theatre =

Israeli modern dance company

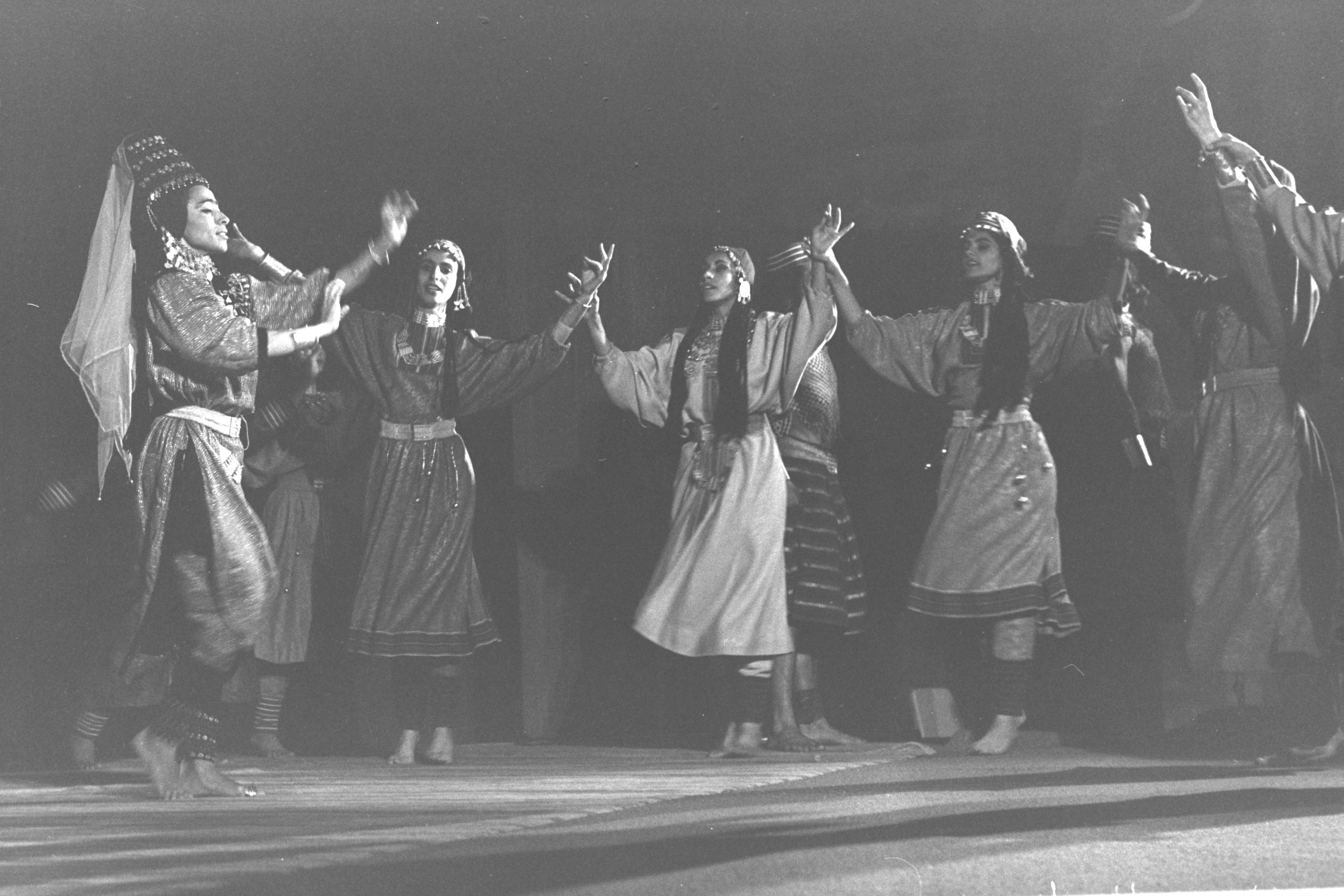
Inbal dancers, 1964

Inbal Dance Theatre (Hebrew: תאטרון מחול ענבל, Teatron Makhol Inbal) is Israel's first and oldest modern dance company, started in 1949.

== History ==
The company was founded in 1949 by Israel Prize recipient Sara Levi-Tanai. Under the mentorship of Jerome Robbins—who staged many of the company’s largest works—Inbal toured internationally to critical acclaim performing in prestigious venues such as the Martin Beck Theatre on Broadway, the Sarah Bernhardt Theatre in Paris, London's Drury Lane, Her Majesty’s Theatre in Australia and La Scala de Milano. Most of the company's early works were built around Margalit Oved, the principal dancer for the first 15 years. About Margalit Martha Graham wrote, "She never comes on the stage for me to see her that tears do not come to my eyes. She has a quality which is very, very, very special in the world...It is special wherever a great being dominated by a passion comes to the stage.”

The Inbal troupe appeared on American television on November 22, 1959 on NBC's Dinah Shore Chevy Show. Inbal's dancers participated in George Stevens' epic 1965 film "The Greatest Story Ever Told" starring Max Von Sydow. In 1979, the company performed "A Legend in the Sands." The music was written by Yoni Rechter, who also composed the music for "Jaffa is Sleeping."

The company received numerous awards including Best Choreography at the 1962 Les Halles International Choreography Competition in Paris.

In August 2014, Barak Marshall, former house choreographer of the Batsheva Dance Company and son of Margalit Oved, the company's star dancer and artistic director from 1994-1996, was appointed as the new artistic director of both the company and the Inbal World Arts Centre.

The company rehearses and performs at the Inbal Theatre which is located on the campus of the Suzanne Dellal Center for Dance and Theatre in Neve Tzedek, Tel Aviv.

== Awards and recognition ==
- “Megilat Ruth” dance for which Sara Levi-Tanai was awarded the title of “Best Choreographer during the Les Halles Festival held in Paris in 1962.

== See also ==
- Dance in Israel
- Culture of Israel
- Vertigo (Dance Company)
