= Barak Marshall =

American-born Israeli choreographer and singer

Barak Marshall (Hebrew: ברק מרשל) is an American-born Israeli choreographer and singer.

== Biography ==
Barak Marshall was born in Los Angeles, as the son of dancer and choreographer Margalit Oved. After he had completed a Bachelor of Arts in social science from Harvard University, where he studied social theory and philosophy, he immigrated to Israel, where he started a career in dance in 1995, when his mother became the artistic director of the Inbal Dance Theater. He was made the artistic director of the Inbal Dance Theatre and Ethnic Center in 2014 and was as of 2025 the artistic director of the Inbal Dance Theatre for a second time.

=== Career ===
His first piece, Aunt Leah (1995), won first prize at the Shades in Dance (Gvanim B'Machol) Festival. At Curtain Up (Haramat Masach), he staged The Land of Sad Oranges (1997), Shoshana's Balcony (1998), Zion (1998), and Emma Goldman's Wedding (1998).

He was the house choreographer for the Batsheva Dance Company from 1999 to 2001. He has performed with the Los Angeles Jewish Symphony, the Israel Philharmonic Orchestra, the Yuval Ron Ensemble, and Yo-Yo Ma. He also has performed with the Silk Road Project.

== Awards ==
- Suzanne Dellal's 1995 Shades of Dance Choreography Competition: First prize, for Aunt Leah. The work was also added to the repertoire of the Inbal Dance Theater.
- The 1998 Bagnolet International Competition awards: First Prize for Emma Goldman’s Wedding. The piece also won him the Prix d'Auteur Award, the Bonnie Byrd Award for New Choreography and the National ADAMI Award.
- The 2009 Creative Capital (New York) for Symphony of Tin Cans, with Margalit Oved and Tamir Muskat of Balkan Beat Box.
- The 2010 Lester Horton Award for Outstanding Achievement in Choreography
- First Prize, the Joyce Theatre Foundation 2010 A.W.A.R.D. Show
