= Sara Levi-Tanai =

Israeli choreographer and songwriter

- שרה לוי-תנאי
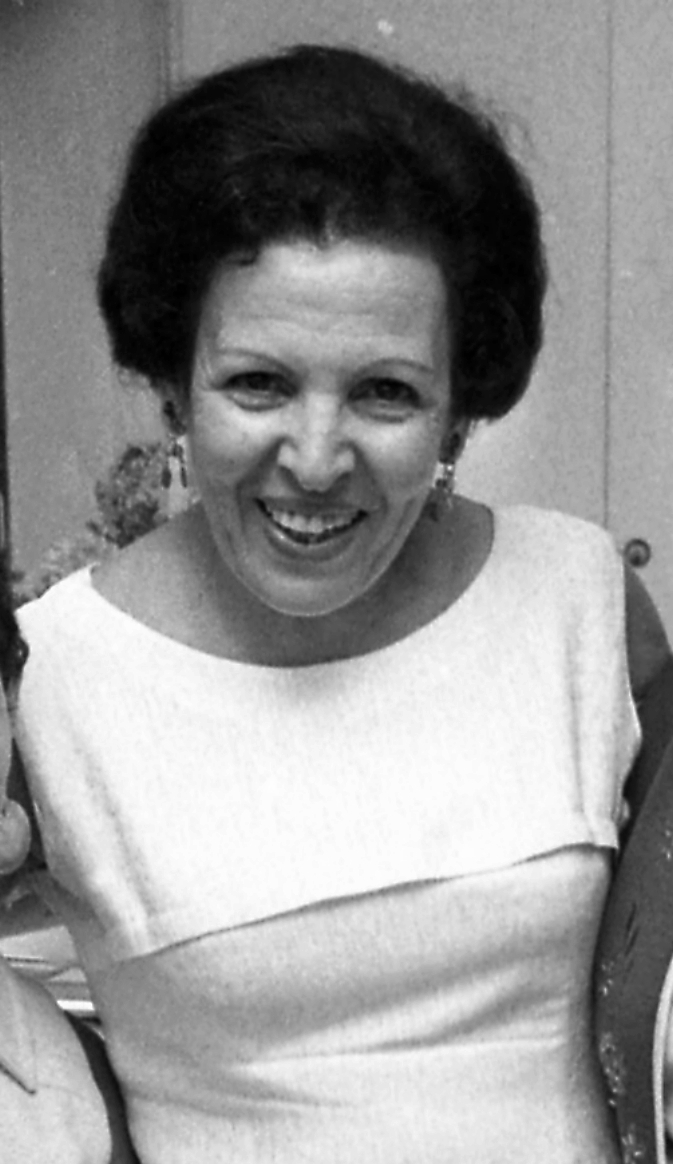
- Born: c. 1910; Jerusalem, Ottoman Palestine
- Died: 3 October 2005
- Citizenship: Israeli
- Occupations: Choreographer and song writer
- Awards: 1973 Israel Prize

Sara Levi-Tanai (Hebrew: שרה לוי-תנאי; c. 1910 – 3 October 2005) was an Israeli choreographer and song writer. She was the founder and artistic director of the Inbal Dance Theater and recipient of the Israel Prize in dance.

== Prizes and awards ==
- In 1964, Levi-Tanai's Book of Ruth won an award from the Théâtre des Mondes in Paris.
- In 1973, she was awarded the Israel Prize, in dance, for her contributions in the field of performing arts.
- In 1984, she won the Moshe Halevi Theater Prize, awarded by the Tel Aviv Municipality.
- In 1986, she was the first recipient of the Israel Labor Federation (Histadrut) Prize for music and dance.
- In 1988, she was made an honored citizen of Tel Aviv.

== See also ==
- List of Israel Prize recipients
