= Ga'aton =

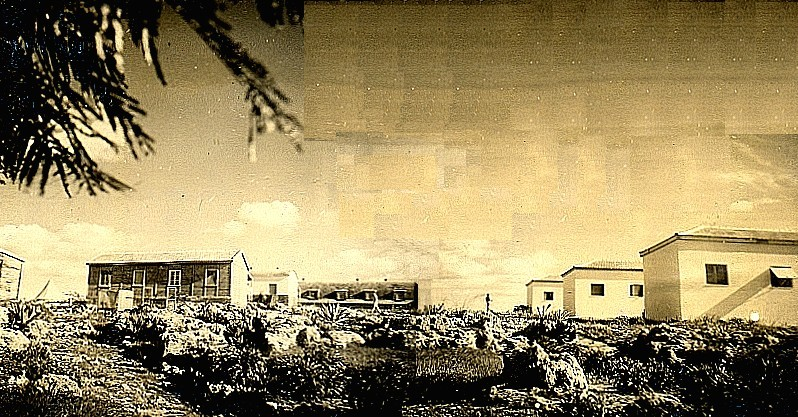

- Location within Northwest Israel
- Coordinates: 33°0′22″N 35°12′52″E
- Grid position: 170/268 PAL
- Country: Israel
- District: Northern
- Subdistrict: Acre
- Council: Mateh Asher
- Affiliation: Kibbutz Movement
- Founded: 1948
- Founder: Hungarian "May 1st" Hashomer Hatzair Members
- Population (2024): 733

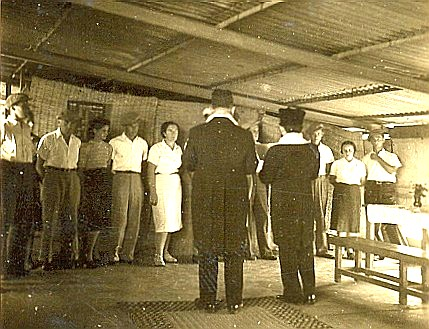
First wedding at Ga'aton: Six couples married in the communal kitchen, c. 1940

Ga'aton (Hebrew: גַּעְתּוֹן) is a kibbutz in northern Israel. Located in the western Galilee, it falls under the jurisdiction of Mateh Asher Regional Council. In 2024 it had a population of 733.

== Etymology ==
The name Ga'aton is taken from the Ga'aton River that passes nearby and flows through Nahariya into the Mediterranean Sea.

Ga'aton is also the name of a biblical town in the allotment of Asher, located at one of the ancient tells (mounds) near the kibbutz. The tell known as Hurvat Ga'aton ("ruins of Ga'aton"; Arabic Khirbat Ja'tun) northwest of the kibbutz and near the Ga'aton River is one candidate, and there are other tells in the vicinity with remains from the time of the Hebrew Bible. Most English translations of the Hebrew Bible offer the name Gaash (2 Samuel 23:30); in the Latin of the Vulgate it is Gaas.

== History ==
=== Antiquity ===
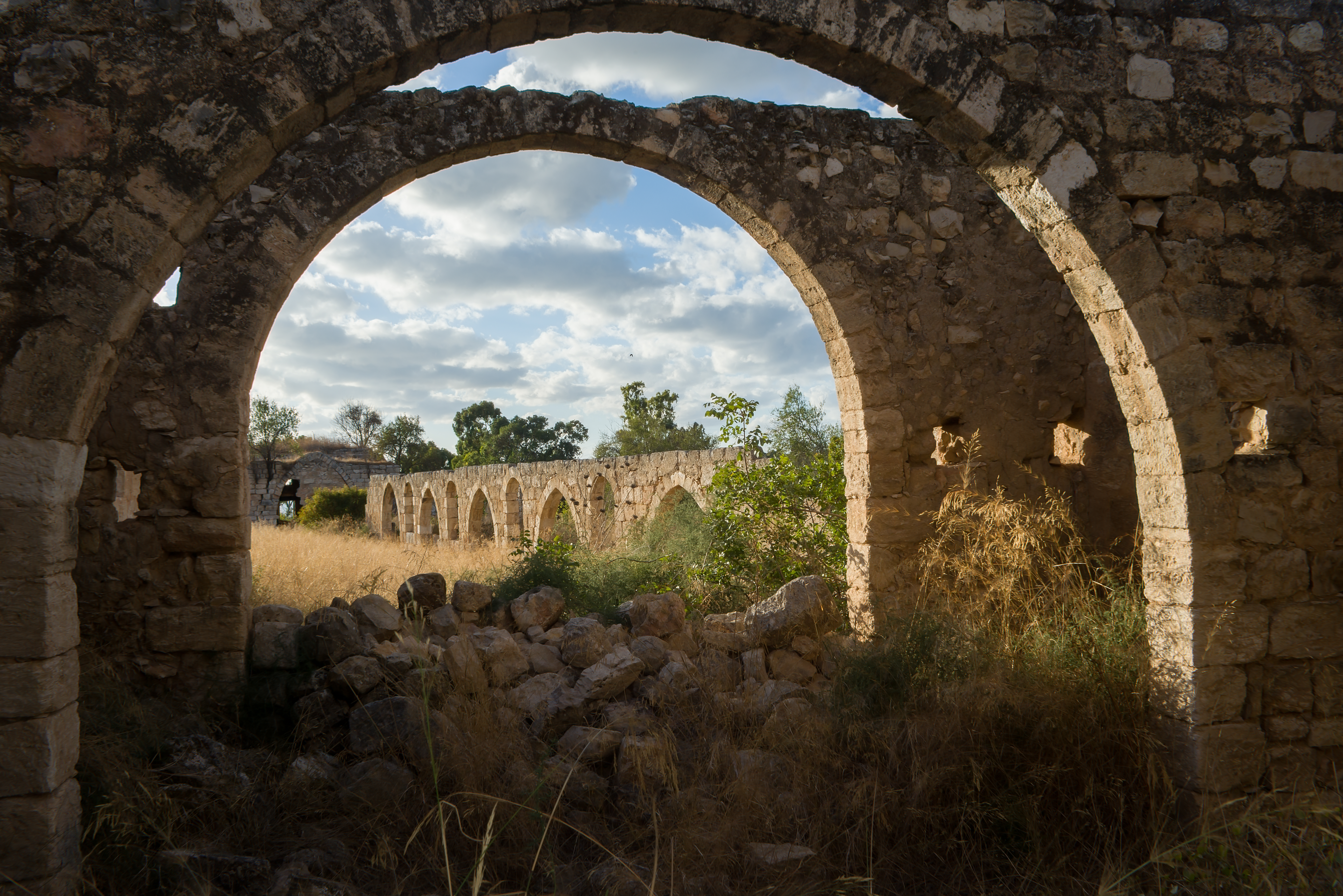
Hurvat Ga'aton

Ceramic remains found in Ga'aton were dated to the Byzantine era, 5th to 7th century CE.

In the Crusader period, Ga'aton (named Iazon) was mentioned in 1160, when it and several other villages in the area of Castellum Regis was transferred to a Crusader named Iohanni de Caypha (Johannes of Haifa). In 1182 Jazun was especially excluded from the list of estates belonging to Jocelyn III in the area.

In 1220, when Jocelyn III's daughter Beatrix de Courtenay and her husband Otto von Botenlauben sold Mi'ilya and its dependencies to the Teutonic Knights, Ga'aton (called Ihazon, Jaharon, Jaroth) was again explicitly excluded from the sale.

In documents dating to 1253 (Jasson) and 1256, (Jashon) it was included in the area of Casal Imbert.

In 1283 Ga'aton was still part of the Crusader states, as it was mentioned as part of their domain in the hudna between the Crusaders based in Acre and the Mamluk sultan Qalawun.

=== Ottoman era ===
Incorporated into the Ottoman Empire in 1517, Ja'tun appeared in the census of 1596, located in the Nahiya of Acca of the Liwa of Safad. The population was 11 households, all Muslim. They paid a fixed tax-rate of 25% on agricultural products, including wheat, barley, fruit trees, cotton, goats and beehives; in addition to grasslands, occasional revenues and a water mill, a total of 3000 Akçe.

In 1875, Victor Guérin found the village to have 15 farmers and shepherds, however, in 1881, the PEF's Survey of Western Palestine (SWP) found at Khurbet Jathun only heaps of stones and modern ruins, a few mills, and some well-dressed stones scattered about.

=== British Mandate ===
The 1922 census of Palestine listed under "Ja'atun" a population of 19 Muslims.

Part of the area was acquired by the Jewish community as part of the Sursock Purchases. In the 1945 statistics the population of Ga'aton was 140, all Jews; the area was counted together with that of Shavei Tzion, Mazra'a and Ein Sara, and totalled 7,407 dunams of land according to an official land and population survey.

=== State of Israel ===
Kibbutz Ga'aton was established in October 1948 in the hills east of Nahariya by a group of Jewish immigrants from Hungary. The name for the kibbutz was taken from a town mentioned in historical accounts of the Jewish return from Babylon which the founders believed was located on the site of Ja'tun. According to Palestinian historian Walid Khalidi, the kibbutz was founded on land near Khirbat Jiddin, a castle in Yehi'am Fortress National Park used by the al-Suwaytat Bedouin tribe and listed by Khalidi as a depopulated Palestinian village.

== Economy ==
One of the kibbutz industries is Yamaton Ltd., a joint venture with Kibbutz Ein Hamifratz. The company produces honeycomb paper products. Kibbutz Ga'aton is the home of the Kibbutz Contemporary Dance Company (KCDC). The company's dance groups participate in some 200 performances a year in Israel and overseas.

== Notable people ==
- Yael Ron Ben-Moshe (born 1978), member of the Knesset for Blue and White
- Shmuel Katz (1926–2010), artist, illustrator and cartoonist

== See also ==
- Sursock family

== Bibliography ==
- Barag, Dan (1979). "A new source concerning the ultimate borders of the Latin Kingdom of Jerusalem". Israel Exploration Journal. 29 (3/4): 197–217. JSTOR 27925726.
- Barron, J.B., ed. (1923). Palestine: Report and General Abstracts of the Census of 1922. Government of Palestine.
- Conder, C.R.; Kitchener, H.H. (1881). The Survey of Western Palestine: Memoirs of the Topography, Orography, Hydrography, and Archaeology. Vol. 1. London: Committee of the Palestine Exploration Fund.
- Dauphin, C. (1998). La Palestine byzantine, Peuplement et Populations. BAR International Series 726 (in French). Vol. III : Catalogue. Oxford: Archeopress. ISBN 978-0-860549-05-5.
- Frankel, Rafael (1988). "Topographical notes on the territory of Acre in the Crusader period". Israel Exploration Journal. 38 (4): 249–272. JSTOR 27926125.
- Government of Palestine, Department of Statistics (1945). Village Statistics, April, 1945.
- Grootkerk, Salomon E. (2000). Ancient sites in Galilee: a toponymic gazetteer (Illustrated ed.). BRILL. ISBN 978-90-04-11535-4.
- Guérin, V. (1880). Description Géographique Historique et Archéologique de la Palestine (in French). Vol. 3: Galilee, pt. 2. Paris: L'Imprimerie Nationale.
- Hütteroth, W.-D.; Abdulfattah, K. (1977). Historical Geography of Palestine, Transjordan and Southern Syria in the Late 16th Century. Erlanger Geographische Arbeiten, Sonderband 5. Erlangen, Germany: Vorstand der Fränkischen Geographischen Gesellschaft. ISBN 978-3-920405-41-4.
- Khalidi, W. (1992). All That Remains: The Palestinian Villages Occupied and Depopulated by Israel in 1948. Washington D.C.: Institute for Palestine Studies. ISBN 978-0-88728-224-9.
- Khamisy, Rabei G. (2014). "The Treaty of 1283 between Sultan Qalāwūn and the Frankish Authorities of Acre: A New Topographical Discussion". Israel Exploration Journal. 64, 1: 72–102.
- Mariti, G. (1769). Viaggi per l'isola di Cipro e per la Soria e Palestina fatti da Giovanni Mariti fiorentino dall'anno 1760 al 1768 tomo ... (in Italian). Vol. II. p. 157.
- Mariti, G. (1792). Travels Through Cyprus, Syria, and Palestine; with a General History of the Levant. Vol. 1. Dublin: P. Byrne. p. 333.
- Morris, B. (2004). The Birth of the Palestinian Refugee Problem Revisited. Cambridge University Press. ISBN 978-0-521-00967-6.
- Palmer, E.H. (1881). The Survey of Western Palestine: Arabic and English Name Lists Collected During the Survey by Lieutenants Conder and Kitchener, R. E. Transliterated and Explained by E.H. Palmer. Committee of the Palestine Exploration Fund.
- Petersen, Andrew (1995). "Khirbat Jathun: An Ottoman Farmhouse inWestern Galilee". Palestine Exploration Quarterly. 127 (1): 33–40. doi:10.1179/peq.1995.127.1.33.
- Petersen, Andrew (2001). A Gazetteer of Buildings in Muslim Palestine (British Academy Monographs in Archaeology). Vol. I. Oxford University Press. pp. 180−181. ISBN 978-0-19-727011-0.
- Röhricht, R. (1893). (RRH) Regesta regni Hierosolymitani (MXCVII-MCCXCI) (in Latin). Berlin: Libraria Academica Wageriana.
- Rhode, H. (1979). Administration and Population of the Sancak of Safed in the Sixteenth Century (PhD). Columbia University. Archived from the original on 2019-04-20.
- Starck, E. von (1894). Palæstina und Syrien von Anfang der Geschichte bis zum Siege des Islam: Lexikalisches Hilfsbuch für Freunde des Heiligen Landes. Berlin: Verlag von Reuther & Reichard. p. 58. "Gaas — ... 2 Sam. 23, 30 ... LXX Nachaligaas, Vulg. torrens Gaas"
- Strehlke, E., ed. (1869). Tabulae Ordinis Theutonici ex tabularii regii Berolinensis codice potissimum. Berlin: Weidmanns.
- Tsafrir, Y.; Leah Di Segni; Judith Green (1994). (TIR): Tabula Imperii Romani: Judaea, Palaestina. Jerusalem: Israel Academy of Sciences and Humanities. ISBN 978-965-208-107-0.
