= Tel Aviv Foundation =

Israeli foundation

- קרן תל אביב-יפו

- Library at Tel Aviv, established with support from the foundation
- Formation: 1977; 49 years ago
- Founders: Shlomo Lahat and Ted Arison
- Type: Nonprofit organization
- Purpose: Fundraising for urban development, education, welfare, culture, sports and public spaces
- Headquarters: 69 Ibn Gabirol Street, Tel Aviv, Israel
- Chair: Ron Huldai
- CEO: Hila Oren (since 2016)
- Website: www.telavivfoundation.org

The Tel Aviv Foundation (Hebrew: קרן תל אביב-יפו; officially the Tel Aviv–Yafo Foundation for Development; Hebrew: קרן תל אביב-יפו לפיתוח) is an Israeli nonprofit organization that serves as the philanthropic fundraising arm of the Tel Aviv-Yafo Municipality. It raises donations in Israel and abroad to finance projects in education, social welfare, culture, sports, the environment and public spaces, implemented in cooperation with the municipality.

The foundation was established in 1977 by Tel Aviv mayor Shlomo Lahat and businessman Ted Arison. The incumbent mayor has served as its chair since its establishment; Ron Huldai has held that position since 1998. The foundation states that it has helped finance approximately 1,000 projects across the city. In 2017, marking its 40th anniversary, it reported having raised approximately US$550 million for more than 600 projects. Facilities supported by the foundation include the Suzanne Dellal Centre for Dance and Theatre, the Tel Aviv Cinematheque, the Israel Conservatory of Music, Tel Aviv and Charles Clore Park.

In 2026, the foundation began events marking its forthcoming 50th anniversary in 2027. It adopted the anniversary theme "50 Years of Urban Zionism" and held its first related event during the Open House (Batim Mibifnim) event in May 2026.

== History ==
=== Establishment and early years ===
The Tel Aviv Foundation was established in 1977 by Shlomo Lahat, who had become mayor in 1974, and his friend, American Jewish businessman Ted Arison. Lahat sought to strengthen Tel Aviv's position as an Israeli center of business, culture and education. The new foundation was intended to raise resources, establish relationships with donors and implement projects in cooperation with the municipality.

The foundation was incorporated as a nonprofit association. Its registered objectives encompass establishing, operating and supporting cultural, social, educational, health, scientific, sports, religious, charitable, welfare and other development initiatives in Tel Aviv-Yafo. Its separate legal status enables it to issue tax-deductible donation receipts, a function not directly available to the municipality.

During its early years, the foundation concentrated largely on physical infrastructure. In the early 1980s, it supported the creation of public gardens, parks and playgrounds in neighborhoods across the city. In 1981, Arison established the foundation's first international representation in New York City and led its overseas fundraising, increasing support from donors in the United States.

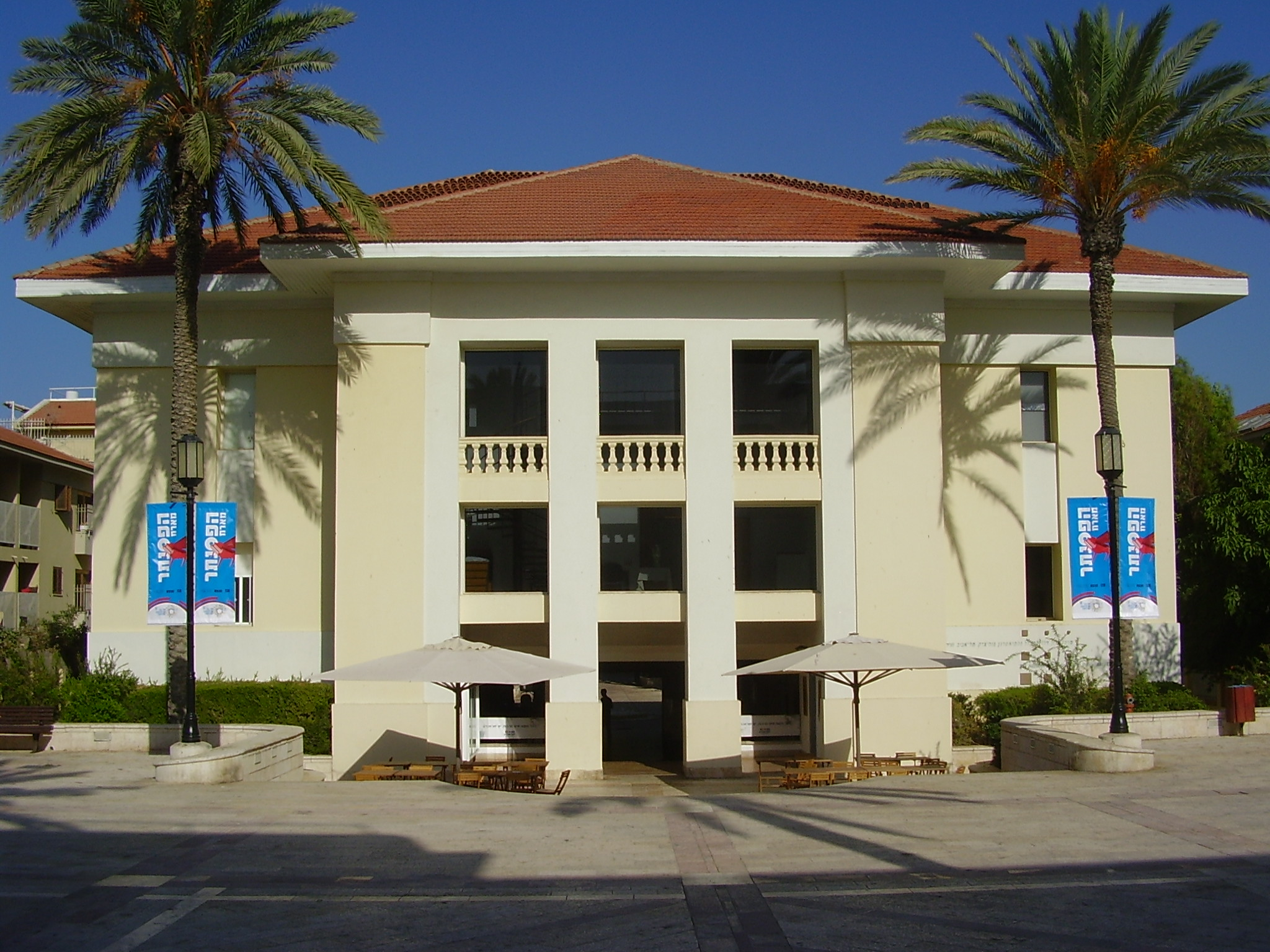
The preserved former school building at the Suzanne Dellal Centre

Between 1988 and 1989, the foundation supported the establishment of three cultural institutions:

- The Israel Conservatory of Music, Tel Aviv, named for Lynn and Ted Arison;
- The Suzanne Dellal Centre for Dance and Theatre in Neve Tzedek;
- The Tel Aviv Cinematheque.

A British friends association was registered as a charitable trust in 1986. Between 1990 and 1995, the foundation expanded its international activities and established or developed friends associations in the United Kingdom, Canada and Germany.

=== Since 1998 ===
Following Ron Huldai's election as mayor in 1998, he became chair of the foundation. At a time when the municipality faced financial difficulties, Huldai sought donations from supporters worldwide to fund urban projects. During the 2000s, the foundation expanded into early childhood programs and assistance for asylum seekers in Israel. It also supported the initiative associated with the designation of the White City as a UNESCO World Heritage Site in 2003. In 2009, the foundation participated in Tel Aviv's centennial events.

In 2002, Avraham Ben-Shoshan, a former commander of the Israeli Navy, was appointed CEO.

The Sylvan Adams National Velodrome

In 2016, Hila Oren became CEO. Previously, she had founded and directed Tel Aviv Global, a municipal initiative aimed at positioning Tel Aviv-Yafo as an international center for innovation. The initiative promoted the "Startup City" identity, and Tel Aviv won a smart-city award at the 2014 Smart City Expo in Barcelona.

During Oren's tenure, the reported composition of the foundation's activities shifted from approximately 90% construction projects to 60% construction and 40% programs and other activities. The donor base also changed: while American Jewish donors had previously supplied most donations, the share originating from Israeli philanthropists, including the technology sector, increased. The foundation marked its 40th anniversary in 2017.

In 2020, the Sylvan Adams National Velodrome, described as the foundation's largest project to that point, was inaugurated. Around the same period, the foundation expanded into areas including child food security and experimental financial tools, among them a pilot municipal digital currency.

During the COVID-19 pandemic in Israel, the foundation operated the "Mayor's Emergency Fund", providing food, medicine, hygiene products and assistance to older residents, supported by volunteers.

=== Assistance funds and scholarships ===
Alongside its urban development projects, the foundation operates assistance funds and scholarship programs for city residents. According to the foundation, it has awarded approximately 10,000 scholarships to students from Tel Aviv-Yafo through various funds and donors. Its programs include a scholarship initiative operated in cooperation with the Maychor Foundation for more than three decades.

== Chief executives ==
- Israel Gravinsky (1977–1982)
- Chanan Ben Yehuda (1982–1992)
- Elchanan Cohen (1992–1993)
- David Altman (1993–1998)
- Talia Glantz (1998–1999)
- David "Dedi" Harnik (1999–2003)
- Avraham Ben-Shoshan (2003–2010)
- Zvi Kanor (2010–2015)
- Hila Oren (2016–present)

== Projects and activities ==
=== Culture and the arts ===
- Suzanne Dellal Centre for Dance and Theatre (1989): Established in partnership with the municipality, the foundation, the Ministry of Education and Culture, the Dellal family foundation and other donors.
- New campus of the Tel Aviv High School for the Arts: Built in cooperation with Shari Arison and the Arison Foundation; inaugurated in 2000.
- Beit Lessin Theater: In connection with the opening of its new home at the intersection of Dizengoff Street and Frishman Street in 2019, businessman Baruch Ivcher donated NIS 25 million to the foundation and theater, which subsequently bore his name.
  Tel Aviv City Museum
- Tel Aviv City Museum: The Shoshana and Zevulun Tomer Tel Aviv-Yafo City Museum was developed in the former municipal building at Bialik Square, as a joint project of the foundation and municipality, and opened in 2024.
- Tel Aviv Cinematheque (1989).
- Israel Conservatory of Music, Tel Aviv (1988): Named for Lynn and Ted Arison.
- Great Synagogue of Tel Aviv restoration: A project initiated by the foundation with the Drahi Foundation and municipality, budgeted at approximately NIS 107 million. Plans include removing the exterior additions built in the 1970s, restoring the original 1920s facade and creating a public square in front of the building.
- Be'eri Gallery restoration: In cooperation with the German government and Liebling Haus (2024).

=== Sports ===
- Sylvan Adams National Velodrome: An indoor cycling track at the Hadar Yosef sports complex, built at an estimated cost of NIS 70 million. It hosted the 2022 UCI Junior Track Cycling World Championships.
- Daniel Rowing Centre: A rowing center on the Yarkon River.

=== Public spaces and environment ===
- Charles Clore Park.
- Public gardens and neighborhood parks: Dozens of spaces established or renovated with support from overseas donors, including Bitzaron Garden, Rosalind Gluckstein Garden in Jaffa and Louis Marshall Garden.
- "Health Pockets" program: A public-space initiative based on the foundation's view of shared spaces as a means of improving social inclusion. The program promotes street furniture, Wi-Fi and features intended to encourage social interaction and reduce loneliness.

=== Education and social welfare ===
- Libraries and learning spaces at municipal schools, including Municipal High Schools No. 9 and No. 5.
- Funding for young people from Tel Aviv to attend Kimama summer camps.
- "Home for Life": Residential accommodation for 24 autistic adults, operated by ALUT.
- Rita Gold Early Childhood Education Center in the Bavli neighborhood.
- "Social Market": A food store serving approximately 4,000 asylum seekers and other residents without permanent status.
- Hossidman Rehabilitation Hospital: In June 2026, the foundation, municipality and Reuth nonprofit announced a NIS 200 million anchor donation from the Mexico-based Hossidman Family Foundation toward a new campus for Reuth Rehabilitation Hospital in the Sde Dov district. The overall project was estimated at approximately US$390 million. The planned hospital would have around 540 beds and was expected, at the time of the announcement, to open within approximately six years.

=== Financial initiatives ===
In a pilot project involving a municipal digital currency, the foundation and municipality launched a campaign supporting businesses on Jerusalem Boulevard in Jaffa that had been affected by closures associated with construction of the Tel Aviv Light Rail. According to the foundation, the campaign generated approximately US$600,000 in local economic activity and attracted around 4,000 new customers to approximately 100 businesses.

== See also ==
- Jerusalem Foundation
