= Noam Meiri =

- נעם מאירי
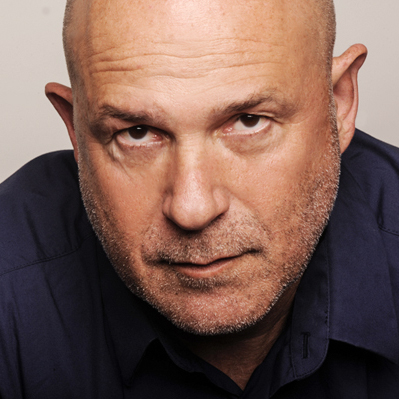
- Noam Meiri
- Born: March 27, 1958 (age 68); Israel
- Occupations: Actor, director, writer, teacher

Noam Meiri (Hebrew: נעם מאירי; born March 27, 1958) is an Israeli theater artist, actor, director and acting teacher. Meiri is a co-founder of the Tel Aviv Haguf Theater (Theater of the Body) School and Stage for Physical theatre, inspired by the method of Jacques Lecoq. Since 1999 he has served as a professor of Physical Theater at Folkwang University of the Arts in Essen, Germany.

== Biography ==
Noam Meiri was raised in Ramat Gan. He studied at the Beit Zvi School for the Performing Arts with teachers Suheil Haddad and Irit Wager, and at Bat-Dor Dance Company's School. Meiri graduated with a B.A from Tel Aviv University's Education School and Theater Department (1980-1984). He studied at L'École Internationale de Théâtre Jacques Lecoq (1984-1986) and completed his education in the Alexander technique and the Laban Movement Analysis method. H

== Theater and teaching career ==
In 1987 Meiri co-founded the theater troupe Faubourg Teatron, along with Rivi Feldmesser-Yaron and Walter Anichoffer (Austria). The troupe performed its play, Nashim BaPark (Women in the Park) at the Tzavta Theater in Tel Aviv, as well as in the Israeli Fringe Theater Festival in Acco and at the Comic Theater Festival in Salzburg, Austria. In 1988 he co-created the cabaret HaMofa shel Rapunzel (Rapunzel's Show), with Rivi Feldmesser-Yaron, Gal Friedman and Gail Hareven. The play was performed at the Tzavta Theater and in numerous theaters and festivals. In 1990 Meiri created the HaAchim Grim Mesparim (Grimm Brothers Tell Tales) show, which was performed regularly at the Beit Lessin Theater, with the musicians Tzvia Sharet and Gal Friedman. Simultaneously he gained fame as a storyteller on TV, on the Children's Channel.

Over the years, Meiri developed a unique method of Physical Theater Storytelling. He used this method while directing Shay Schwartz's play, Tzeh HaHutza, Yeled Ra (Out, Bad Boy!) in 1992 for the Teatroneto Festival for One-Person Plays at Tel Aviv's Suzanne Dellal Center for Dance and Theater. He performed at the same festival in 1993 with the one-man play Momik, adapting David Grossman's novel, directed by Daniella Michaeli.

In 1994 Noam Meiri and Yair Qedar started the theater troupe Yesh Lo Milim Mishelo (Words of His Own). Meiri also directed and played in the show by the same name composed of texts written by Gay Israeli writers, along with the actors Itzik Cohen, Tzahi Grad and Hagai Ayad. The show was a breakthrough for Israeli Gay theater and following the success it gained in Israel, it was translated into English and performed at the Edinburgh Festival in Scotland, and other festivals in Manchester, London (1995), and later in New York and San Francisco. The preparations for the trip to the Edinburgh Festival and the trip itself, were the subject of Erez Laufer's documentary Edinburgh Lo Mehaka (Don't Cry for Me, Edinburgh) . During his Words of His Own tour Meiri facilitated numerous Physical Theater Storytelling master classes in London and New York acting schools, and became a world renown Physical Theater and Storytelling teacher.

In 1996-2001 Meiri taught at the Performing Arts Studio founded by Yoram Leowenstein, directing original productions with studio graduates, such as Good Stuff, with the playwright Sigal Avin and the actors Yuval Segal, Dorit Bar Or, Hila Goshen, Natti Ornan and others; Lovers' Stories, with Sigal Avin, Gavriel Hadar, Tamar Michael, Oded Manster and others; Shakespeare's Love's Labor's Lost with Yael Sharoni, Yuval Berger, Yoav Yeffet and others. Following the performance of Love's Labor's Lost at the Recklinhausen Festival in Germany, in 1999, Meiri was invited to teach at the Folkwang University of the Arts in Essen, Germany, where he resides today as a Physical Theater Professor.

In 2002 Meiri, with Nelly Amar and Gil Bechar, co-founded Tel Aviv's Haguf Theater (Theater of The Body) School and Stage for Physical Theater, inspired by the method of Jacques Lecoq. The school, which was open for eight years, gained both the Ministry of Culture's and the Tel Aviv Municipality's support and recognition as a unique theater center, training stage artists in Physical Theater techniques. In 2011 Meiri directed The Happy Prince (in German), adapting Oscar Wilde's story. The play represented the Folkwang University's Theater Department at the Kampnagel Theater's Festival for German-speaking acting schools in Hamburg, Germany. In 2013 he created the original opera show Longing for Amor and Psyche (in German) at the Pina Bausch Theater in Essen, Germany.

In 2012 Meiri wrote Avshalom (in Hebrew), performing it with the musician Vered Dekel. The play, directed by Noam Ben Azar was staged at the Tmuna Theater, and was nominated for the Golden Hedgehog Award in 2013.

== Film career ==
Meiri played in several movies including: Endless Happiness (1997) directed by Igal Bursztyn, and Tel Aviv Stories (1992) directed by Ayelet Menahemi and Nirit Yaron. He also played the lead role in An Evening without Na'ama (1992), directed by Moshe Zimmerman, with the actors Limor Goldstein, Doron Tsabari, Michael Sharfstein and others.

== Plays Directed and Adapted by Meiri ==
Longing for Amor and Psyche (In German), 2013. An original ensemble work inspired by Apuleius's Cupid and Psyche. Summer project of The Opera Department of Folkwang University of the Arts at Essen, Germany. The play was performed at the Pina Bausch Theater in Essen, Germany. Oscar Wilde's The Happy Prince (In German), 2011. Produced by the Folkwang University's Theater Department. The show participated at the Kampnagel Theater's festival and contest for German-speaking acting schools. Shakespeare's Love's Labor's Lost (In Hebrew), 2011. Translated by Dori Parnes. The play, produced by the Tel Aviv Performing Arts Studio founded by Yoram Leowenstein's, was performed at the International Shakespeare Festival for Acting Schools in Recklinhausen, Germany Long. , Long Ago, 1999. An original play inspired by different creation myths, co-directed with Ilan Reichel. Performed at The Courtyard Theater in London. Lovers' Stories (in Hebrew), 1997. Based on short stories by Guy de Maupassant and Anton Chekhov. Premiered at the Short Theater Festival, Tzavta Theater, Tel Aviv.

Words of His Own (originally in Hebrew, was also performed in English), 1994-97. A play by the first Israeli Gay theater troupe, co-created by Meiri and Yair Qedar. Based on stories by Gal Uchovsky, Tamir Lahav-Radlmesser, Shay Levin and others. Edited by Yair Qedar. Tzavta Theater, Tel Aviv. Additional performances: Following 100 performances in Israel, the play was also staged at The Edinburgh Festival and other festivals in Manchester, London, New York and San Francisco. The cast's preparations for the trip to the Edinburgh Festival and the trip itself, were the subject of Erez Laufer's documentary Edinburgh Lo Mekahka Li (Don't Cry for Me, Edinburgh). Out, Bad Boy! (In Hebrew), 1993. Written and directed by Shay Schwartz. The Teatroneto Festival for One-Person Plays at Tel Aviv's Suzanne Dellal Center for Dance and Theater.

== Acting in Theater ==
Avshalom, 2012, written and performed by Meiri. A one-man-show, directed by Noam Ben Azar, with original music composed by pianist Vered Dekel. The play was performed in Tel Aviv's Tmuna Theater and Meiri was nominated for the 2013 Fringe Theater Golden Hedgehog Award for the Best Performer. Momik, 1993–94, a one-person play adapting David Grossman's novel See Under: Love, directed by Daniella Michaeli was performed by Meiri at the Teatroneto Festival for One-Person Plays at Tel Aviv's Suzanne Dellal Center for Dance and Theater. Memshelet Nashim (A Government of Women), 1993, A comedy written by Nisim Aloni and directed by Frida Rafael for the Acco Festival of Alternative Israeli Theater .

Meeting Point, 1999-2001, a clown burlesque show, directed by Pierre Byland from Switzerland. The play was performed at the Dimitri Theater in Switzerland and at the Bellevue Theater in Amsterdam. HaMofa shel Rapunzel (Rapunzel's Show), 1988-1990, a play directed by Rivi Feldmesser-Yaron and created cooperatively by Meiri, Feldmesser-Yaron, Gal Friedman and Gail Hareven. It premiered at the Tzavta Theater in Tel Aviv, and later was performed all over Israel, including in several theater festivals. Nashim BaPark (Women in the Park), 1987 by the theater troupe Faubourg Teatron Meiri co-founded along with Rivi Feldmesser-Yaron and Walter Anichoffer (Austria). The troupe performed its play at the Tzavta Theater in Tel Aviv, as well as in the Israeli Fringe Theater Festival in Acco and at the Comic Theater Festival in Salzburg, Austria.

== Plays and Shows for Children ==
Over the years Noam Meiri gained fame as a storyteller for children. Since 1989 he has appeared in storytellers' and children's theater festivals all over Israel. Additionally, Meiri has created several original children's storytelling plays with other artists. Little Fingers , 1996–97, written and directed by Avishay Grinfeld-Caspi, featuring dancer Alice Dor-Cohen, pianist Zehava Simon and violinist Shimon Abelovitch. The play premiered at the Sound of Music Festival in the Upper Galilee. An Old Lady, an Elephant and a Flat to Let (in Hebrew. The play was also performed in English), 1994-97. Based on stories by Lea Goldberg (Flat to Let) and Jean de Brunhoff (Babar the Elephant). Directed by Avishay Grinfeld-Caspi. Piano: Zehava Simon. Violin: Shimon Abelovitch. Music Festival in the Upper Galilee, and Suzanne Dellal Center for Dance and Theater. An English version of the play, Living Side by Side, was performed at the New Conservatory Theater's Children's Theater Festival in San Francisco with a guest-performance by dancer Rabaa Murkus.

== Filmography ==
- Osher Lelo Gevul (Endless Happiness), 1997. Written and directed by Igal Bursztyn. The film received the Leiffer Award for the best screenplay; the Ophir Award for the best screenplay, 1996; and the Critics Award for the Best Israeli Movie at the Haifa Film Festival. Meiri appeared with the actors Yael Almog, Ofra Weingarten, Danny Shteg, Igal Adika, Liat Goren, Shira Perver and others.
- Edinburgh Lo Mekahka Li (Don't Cry for Me Edinburgh), 1995 Directed by Erez Laufer. A comic non-fiction film which follows the journey of the Israeli fringe theater group to the Edinburgh Festival as they perform Words of His Own, played and directed by Noam Meiri. Additional actors in the theater group: Tzahi Grad, Hagai Ayad, Itzik Cohen. Producers: Yair Qedar, Meir Katz, Eyal Peled. Editor: Amir Meron
- Erev Bli Na'aama (An Evening without Na'aama), 1992. Director: Moshe Zimmerman. Screenplay by Moshe Zonder and Moshe Zimmerman. Meiri played the leading part, appearing with Dafna Armoni, Limor Goldstein, Doron Tsabari, Amir Kaminer, Michael Sharfstein and others.
- Sipurey Tel Aviv (Tel Aviv Stories), 1992. Directors: Ayelet Menahemi and Nirit Yaron. Meiri acted in the story Mivtza Hatul (Operation Cat) with Dror Keren, Ruthi Goldberg, Saar Fein and others. The movie won four Ophir Awards (AKA the Israeli Oscars).

== Teaching at Dance and Acting Schools ==
1999 - current Folkwang University of the Arts in Essen, Germany, Professor of the Jacques Lecoq Method of Physical Theater.

2002-10 Tel Aviv Haguf Theater (Theater of The Body) School and Stage for Physical Theater, inspired by the method of Jacques Lecoq.

1996-2001 Performing Arts Studio founded by Yoram Leowenstein, Tel Aviv.

1997-2000 Theater Department, Tel Aviv University.

1997-2000 Guildford School of Acting (GSA), UK.

1998-1999 The Laban Centre, London, school for modern dance. Meiri taught the Physical Theater for Dancers class.

1996-1997 Beit Zvi School for the Performing Arts, Ramat Gan.

1994-96 Haifa University (Israel), Theater Department, Physical Theater Storytelling class.

1994-95 The School of Visual Theater Physical Theater class.

== Master Classes ==
2000-2015 International School of Humor, Clown Doctors, Vienna, Austria.

2009-2015, Feldenkrais Zentrum Chava Shalev, Germany

2004-2015 Tel Aviv Beit Ariela Municipal Library School for Storytellers.

2004-2015 High school theater programs.

2013 Goodman Theater and Acting School of the Negev, Be'er Sheba.

2012 Akademie Off-Theater NRW, Germany.

2010-2011 Habama Workshops Tel Aviv.

2010 Nalagaat Center – Stage for blind and deaf people, Jaffa.

2006-2008 Akademie Remscheid, Germany.

2003-2006 Lesley College, Israel, Art Therapy Program.

2001-2003 International Film School Cologne (IFS), Cologne, Germany.

1999 - Scuola Teatro Dimitri: Academy for Physical Theater, Switzerland.

1998-2000 Holon Puppetry School, Israel: The Art of Storytelling workshop.

1998-1999 The Actors Center, London.

1998 RADA, London, visiting professor: The Art of Storytelling workshop.

1997 NYU, New York, visiting professor: The Art of Storytelling workshop.

1985-1987 Tel Aviv Arts School, Physical Theater classes.

== Published works ==
The Actor as Eternal Child – The Role of Play in the Training of Actors in Emilia Perroni, Ed. Play: Psychoanalytic Perspectives, Survival and Human Development. Routledge, 2013.
