= Israel Cultural Excellence Foundation =

Israeli foundation

IcExcellence chosen artists

The Israel Cultural Excellence Foundation (IcExcellence) is a private cultural foundation which aims to identify, nurture, and support Israel's most outstanding artists.

The foundation locates Israeli artists with potential for excellence in a wide variety of artistic fields, including visual arts, music (classical, jazz, and Israeli), dance, theater, cinema, product design, visual communication, fashion design, and writing. The foundation supports its chosen artists for a period of up to five years.

== The foundation ==
IcExcellence was founded by its managing director Rachel Marani, formerly Israel's cultural attaché in Washington. It is financed by businesspeople, companies, and foundations from Israel and all over the world.

The artistic advisory committees consist of 35 artists and public opinion makers, including six Israel Prize laureates, all acting on a voluntary basis. Members include Dubi Lenz, Gal Uchovsky, David Tartakover, Michal Smoira-Cohn, Chaim Topol, Dani Caravan, Yossi Marhaim, Mendi Rodan, Ohad Naharin, Danny Gottfried, Ron Arad, Asher Fisch, Gershon Bram, Alex Padua, and Micah Lewensohn.

The work of the foundation focuses on two main areas. The first, "Developing and advancing the artist’s knowledge and skills", involves building a personal advancement program suited to the artist and their needs. The programs may include taking advanced courses in a foreign country, or learning a relevant professional software program. The second area, "Developing and advancing the artist’s professional career, involves encouraging artists to assume a proactive approach to advancing their careers, based on the understanding that great artistic talent is a prerequisite but in itself does not suffice for developing a prominent local and/or international career. Seminars and annual meetings deal with “career skills”, exposing the artists to subjects such as strategic and business counseling, self-presentation, marketing, branding, and networking. Business coaching is also offered.

== IcExcellence Chosen Artists, 2002-08 ==
=== Israeli Music ===
Din Din Aviv, David D'Or, Lior Elmalich, Victoria Hanna, Rona Kenan, Ron Shem Tov (Izabo), Shlomi Shaban

=== Classical music ===
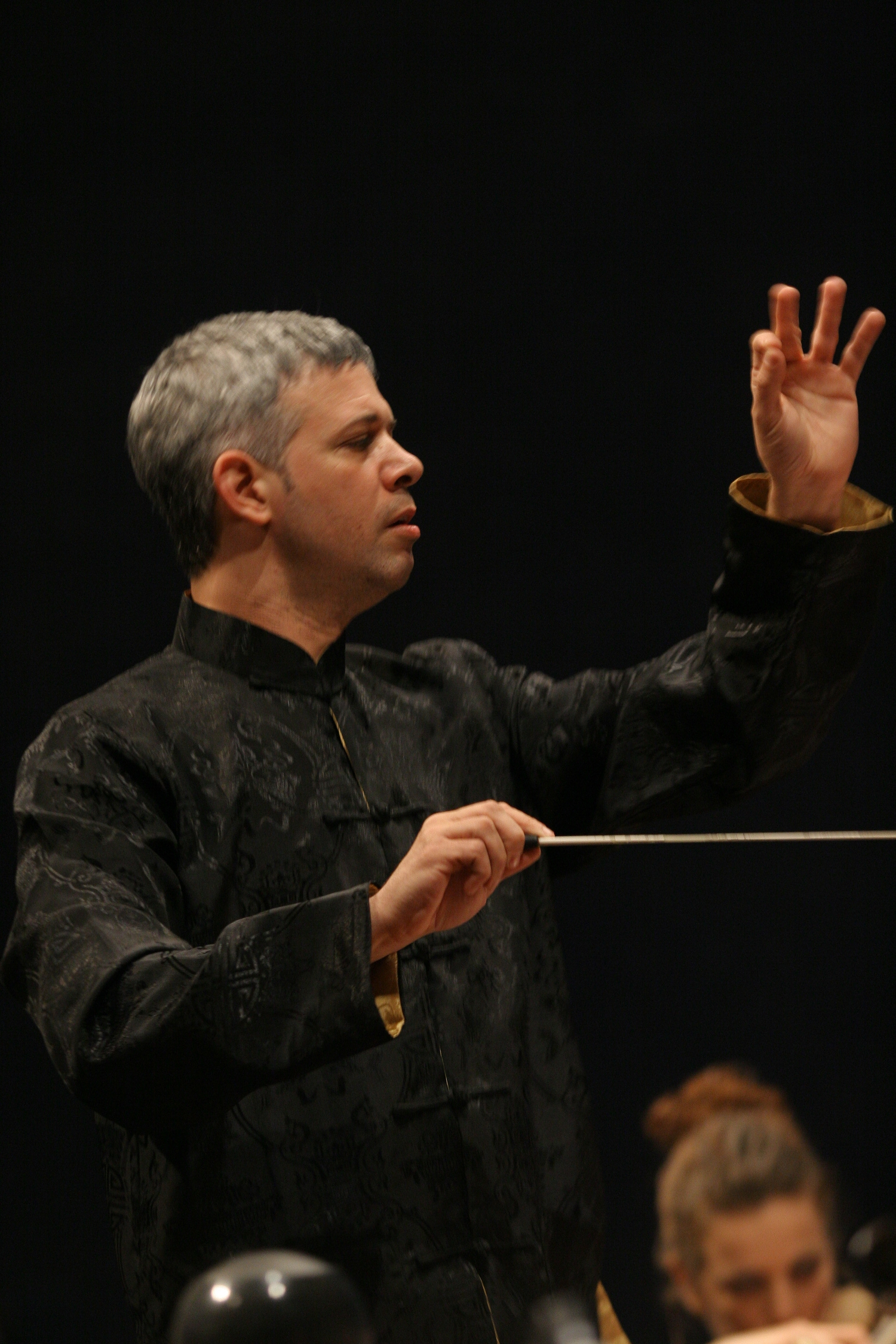
Yaron Gottfried

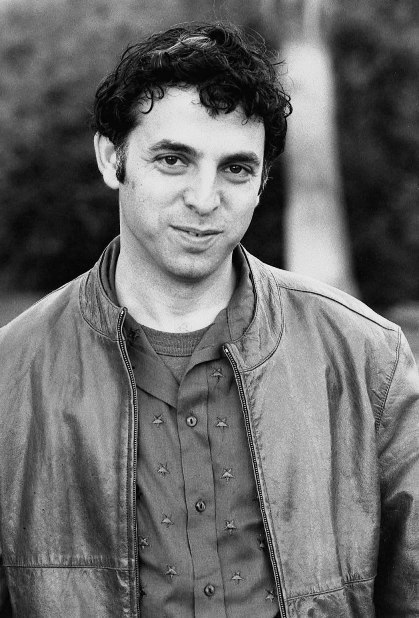
Etgar Keret

Conductors Gil Shohat, Dan Ettinger, and Yaron Gottfried, Opera Singer Chen Reiss, Composer Avner Dorman, Keren Hadar

=== Jazz ===
Avishai Cohen, Eli Degibri

=== Theater ===
Actor Itay Tiran, Set & Lighting Designer Bambi Friedman, Mira Awad, Keren Zur

=== Writing ===
Author Etgar Keret, Eshkol Nevo

=== Film and television ===
Directors Nir Bergman, Tomer Heymann, David Ofek

=== Visual Art ===
Yael Bartana, Zoya Cherkassky, Adi Nes, Talia Keinan, Yehudit Sasportas, Gal Weinstein

=== Visual Communication ===
Graphic Designer Adi Stern, Illustrator Rutu Modan

=== Fashion Design ===
Avshalom Gur, Yaniv Persy, Mirit Weinstock, Claudette Zorea

=== Choreography & Dance ===
Sharon Eyal, Emanuel Gat, Yasmeen Godder, Idit Herman (Clipa Theater)

=== Product Design ===
Ron Gilad, Tal Gur

=== Multi-Disciplinary ===
Ohad Fishof

== See also ==
- Music of Israel
- Dance in Israel
- Culture in Israel
- Cinema of Israel
