= Keren Hadar =

Israeli singer

Keren Hadar קרן הדר
- Born: 1975 (age 49–50) Hod HaSharon, Israel
- Occupation: Singer
- Website: https://www.keren-hadar.com/

Keren Hadar (Hebrew: קרן הדר; born 1975) is a crossover soprano singer from Israel. She was born in Neve Ne'eman in the Hod HaSharon municipality. She is the third of four siblings. Keren's father, a businessman, was born in Israel and her mother, a secretary, was born in Yemen.

== Youth and beginning of career ==
She began her voice training at age 16 at the Petah Tikva Conservatory, studying classical singing with singer and conductor Nili Harpaz. After her army service in the Israeli Air Force, she studied at the Beit Zvi Academy of Performing Arts in Ramat Gan, specializing in musical theatre with Dorit Atzmon. As part of her studies she appeared, among others, as Polly Peachum in the musical The Threepenny Opera by Bertolt Brecht and Kurt Weill, as Eliza Doolittle in My Fair Lady by Alan Jay Lerner and Frederick Loewe and as the High Priestess in Hair by James Rado, Gerome Ragni and Galt MacDermot.

In her last year of studies Keren started appearing in Tel Aviv's Cameri Theater as the singer in "Requiem" ("Ashkava") written and directed by Hanoch Levin. Following her studies at Beit Zvi, Keren continued to appear at the Cameri Theater in addition to performances with the Be'er Sheva Theater in "Master of Two Servants" and "Owls", while collaborating with playwright, lyricist and literature researcher Dr. Dan Almagor in Hebrew songs, with the composer and translator Dori Parnes in songs by poet Hezy Leskly and with composer Yossi Ben-nun in songs by Federico Garcia Lorca.

During this time Keren met her life-partner, Alon Reuven, Principal Horn of the Israel Camerata Jerusalem, and through his encouragement returned to her classical voice training with soprano Sharon Rostorf-Zamir and Efrat Ben-Nun. She also took classes in the Musicology Department and the Music Academy at Tel Aviv University, including harmony, sight-reading and diction in various languages, in addition to German studies at the Goethe Institute in Tel-Aviv.

== Later career ==
Hadar launched her career as a classical singer at the 2004 Classical Chamber Music Festival with the Israel Chamber Orchestra. Keren has since made numerous appearances with orchestras in Israel and around the world, including the Westchester Philharmonic (New York), the Berlin Symphony, the Israel Philharmonic, the Israel Camerata Jerusalem and the Haifa Symphony under the baton of celebrated conductors, such as Zubin Mehta, Lorin Maazel, Noam Sheriff, Arie Vardi, Avner Itai, Avner Biron, Lior Shambadal, Yaron Gottfried, Ud Joffe, Winfried Toll, Gabor Hollerung and Marcello Panni.

Hadar has also appeared in various festivals including the Israel Festival, the Abu Gosh Vocal Music Festival, the Upper Galilee Chamber Music Festival and others and has made many recordings for television and radio.

Hadar has enjoyed close collaboration with the composer, arranger and conductor Rafi Kadishson, with whom she released her first recording dedicated entirely to the composer Mordechai Zeira, together with singer and conductor Dan Ettinger. Kadishson also composed a work for Keren called "Igayon" ("Nonsense"), based on Lewis Carroll's "Alice in Wonderland" books.

Hadar made numerous appearances with the pianist and conductor Yoni Farhi, the horn player Alon Reuven and the classical guitarist Daniel Akiva in Israel and abroad, including England, Germany, China, Croatia, Belgium and Poland.

In 2006-2007 Hadar studied opera in Berlin, thanks to a scholarship she received from conductor and pianist Daniel Barenboim. Her principal teacher in Germany was the alto Prof. Anneliese Fried at The Hochschule für Musik "Hanns Eisler" in Berlin.

At the end of the year Keren won the 2007 Rheinsberg Opera Singing Competition, singing the role of Nanetta in Verdi's Falstaff to critical acclaim.

In September 2007 Keren released her second CD dedicated entirely to Ella Milch-Sheriff's work "Dark am I...", based on an adaptation of biblical texts from the "Song of Songs", done by Keren and the composer. The work was premiered at the Israel Festival in 2007 and has since been performed in Belgium, Luxembourg and Germany.

Hadar is the recipient of America Israel Cultural Foundation scholarships in the field of acting and is the Chosen Artist of the Israel Cultural Excellence Foundation since 2008.

== Discography ==
=== Solo albums ===
- Mordechai Zeira's Songs (2006)
- Dark am I (2007)

=== Co albums ===
- Horn Quest, with Yoni Farhi and Alon Reuven (2010)
- In the High Windows, with Moshe Zorman and Asaf Roth (2010)
- Songs of Wine & Love, by Josef Bardanashvili (2017)
- Nigun, by Daniel Akiva (2017)

=== Guest appearances ===
- Black n Grey, by Reginiano (2016)
- 2023, by Aya Korem (2016)
