= Meiri =

Meiri (Hebrew: מאירי) is a Hebrew-language surname. Notable people with the name include:

- Anat Meiri (born 1961), Israeli athlete
- Menachem Meiri (1249–1315), Catalan rabbi, Talmudist, Maimonidean
- Noam Meiri (born 1958), Israeli theater artist, actor, director and acting teacher
- Rami Meiri (born 1957), Israeli graffiti artist
- Yehudit Kafri (Meiri) (born 1935), a 20th-century Israeli poet, writer
- Yoav Meiri (born 1975), an Israeli butterfly swimmer

== See also ==
- Goldfarb, Levy, Eran, Meiri & Co. (aka "Goldfarb"), the second-largest Israeli law firm
