= Israel Conservatory of Music, Tel Aviv =

Israel Conservatory of Music
- הקונסרבטוריון הישראלי למוסיקה תל אביב (Hebrew)
- Tel Aviv; Israel

Information
- Other name: Stricker Conservatory
- Type: Music conservatory
- Established: 1943
- Chairperson: Gabi Baron
- Director: Costin Canelis-Olier
- Website: www.icm.org.il

The Israel Conservatory of Music, Tel Aviv (Hebrew: הקונסרבטוריון הישראלי למוסיקה תל אביב) named after Ted and Lin Arison and also known as the Stricker Conservatory, is a music conservatory in Tel Aviv, Israel. It provides instrumental music education, primarily for children and young people, and organizes workshops, master classes, and concerts. The conservatory also hosts chamber music and jazz programs and operates concert halls used for performances by Israeli and international musicians.

== History ==
The conservatory was founded in 1943 as the Tel Aviv branch of the Jerusalem Academy of Music. In 1945, it was registered as an association under Ottoman law, the legal framework then used for nonprofit organizations.

The founders of the music academy were a group of musicians who had immigrated from Hungary: Lorand Fenyves (violinist), Alice Fenyves-Rosenberg (violinist and violist), Dr. László Vincze (cellist), Ilona Vincze-Kraus (pianist), Ödön Pártos (violist), and Alexander Uriah Boskovich (composer).

The academy initially operated in the shelter of the Shalva Gymnasium on Reines Street in Tel Aviv. In 1950, it moved to the Tahkemoni School on Lilienblum Street, where it was allocated one room for its exclusive use and permitted to use other classrooms after regular school hours.

In 1965, the academy moved to its new premises on the Tel Aviv University campus in Ramat Aviv. Following the move, the academy and the conservatory became separate institutions.

In 2001, jazz saxophonist and educator Amit Golan established a jazz program at the conservatory.

In June 2004, Costin Canelis-Olier was appointed director of the conservatory.

== Building and facilities ==
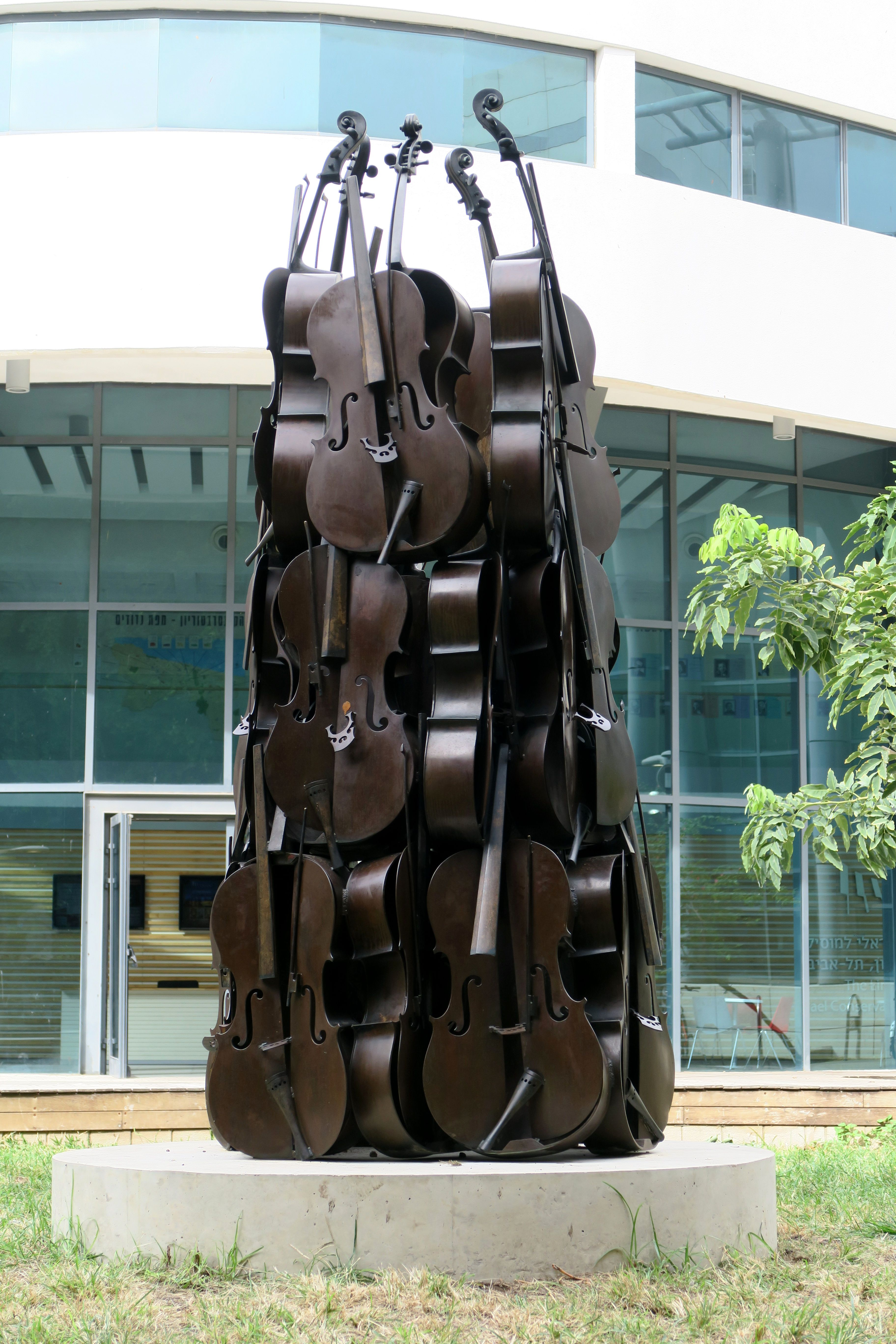
Power of Music II, a 1986 bronze sculpture by Arman, at the Israel Conservatory of Music in Tel Aviv

The conservatory occupies a site bordered by Louis Marshall, Robert Stricker, and Louis Brandeis streets in Tel Aviv. The original building on the site was constructed in 1937 as an immigrant reception center, replacing an earlier facility on HaAliya Street. It was inaugurated in March 1938.

Following the Italian bombing of Tel Aviv in September 1940, the British authorities pressed for the building to be converted into a surgical hospital. The facility included a convalescent ward for Royal Air Force personnel.

In August 1943, the building became the site of Yarkon Hospital, a government-operated general hospital directed by Dr. Shimon Batish. The hospital operated there until 1953, when the establishment of a government hospital at Tel Hashomer led to the closure of Yarkon Hospital and the Pardes Katz Hospital.

The building was subsequently transferred to the Association for the Wellbeing of Israel's Soldiers, which operated a soldiers' hostel called Kiryati Hostel until 1970.

After the hostel closed, the building remained vacant and deteriorated. It underwent extensive renovation in 1981 and became the home of the Israel Conservatory of Music.

The conservatory initially considered preserving the historic building, but its poor structural condition led to a decision to demolish it. In May 2008, a major reconstruction project began. The project involved demolishing the existing structures, constructing two new buildings, renovating the existing auditorium, and building an underground parking garage intended to address parking shortages in the surrounding area.

The reconstruction was completed in the summer of 2012. During the construction period, the conservatory temporarily operated at the Ironi Hey School building on Ben Yehuda Street. Classes resumed at the rebuilt complex during the 2012–2013 academic year. Following the reconstruction, the main entrance faced Louis Marshall Street.

Unlike many educational institutions in Israel, the conservatory complex was designed without perimeter fencing. This resulted from a joint effort by the architects and donors, despite Israeli regulations generally requiring educational facilities to be enclosed.

The conservatory includes a 330-seat auditorium and a smaller 90-seat performance hall named after Ran Baron, who was killed in the Mike's Place suicide bombing on 30 April 2003.

== Chamber Music Center ==
The Chamber Music Center has operated within the Israel Conservatory of Music since 1988. It organizes annual subscription concert series and performances open to the general public, held in the conservatory's auditorium.

Since 2007, the center has been under the artistic direction of Dr. Raz Binyamini.

The center hosts Israeli and international chamber ensembles and soloists. Ensembles that have performed there include the Ysaÿe Quartet, Quatuor Ébène, Modigliani Quartet, Doric String Quartet, Casals Quartet, Bennewitz Quartet, Pavel Haas Quartet, Talich Quartet, Szymanowski Quartet, Jerusalem Trio, Mondrian Trio, Carmel Quartet, Israeli Chamber Project, Meitar Ensemble, and Tel Aviv Soloists Ensemble.

Soloists who have appeared at the center include clarinetists Chen Halevi and Michel Lethiec, violinists Guy Braunstein and Hagai Shaham, cellists Zvi Plesser, Hillel Zori, and Peter Wiley, and pianists Daniel Gortler, Alon Goldstein, Ian Fountain, and Roman Rabinovich.

The center places particular emphasis on supporting young professional musicians and encouraging collaborations between Israeli artists and musicians from abroad.

Its programming combines established works from the chamber music repertoire with less frequently performed compositions from different historical periods. It also includes contemporary works and compositions by Israeli composers, some of which receive their premiere performances at the center.

Alongside its established subscription audience, the center offers discounted tickets to younger concertgoers. As part of its educational activities, it regularly organizes master classes led by visiting performers.

The center also cooperates with the Amitim program, a community initiative supporting people experiencing mental health difficulties, whose participants are offered free admission to concerts organized by the center.

== Jazz Studies Center ==
The Jazz Studies Center was established as a distinct division of the Israel Conservatory of Music in 2010, building on jazz education activities initiated in 2001.

=== Establishment and development ===
In 2001, Amit Golan, who was then teaching a jazz history course at the Thelma Yellin High School of the Arts, was invited to establish a jazz department at the conservatory, which until that time had focused exclusively on classical music.

In 2009, Golan, then head of the jazz department, and Michal Abramov established a joint academic program with The New School in New York City. The program was designed for advanced jazz students pursuing a Bachelor of Fine Arts (BFA) degree in jazz. It allowed students to complete two years of study at the Israel Conservatory of Music before transferring to The New School for an additional two years to complete their degree.

The Jazz Studies Center was formally established in 2010 under Golan's direction. It brought together the jazz department for students aged 14–18, the joint degree program with The New School, the conservatory's representative big band, and a program of master classes, concerts, and performances with international jazz musicians.

In December 2010, Golan died unexpectedly while playing basketball with his students in the courtyard of the Thelma Yellin School.

Golan was succeeded by Erez Bar Noy, who also served as head of the conservatory's jazz department. Bar Noy directed the Jazz Studies Center until 2019.

In 2019, Yuval Cohen, musical director of the conservatory's representative big band, became director of the Jazz Studies Center. Matan Chapnizky was appointed director of the academic program.

=== Faculty and activities ===
The center's teaching staff has included Israeli jazz musicians such as Gilad Abro, Anat Fort, Yonatan Voltzok, Shay Zelman, Danny Benedict, Alon Near, Dorin Margalit, and Ilan Salem.

Since Golan's death, the conservatory has held an annual memorial concert in his honor, featuring students of the Jazz Studies Center alongside international jazz musicians. Visiting musicians also conduct workshops and perform with students.

Artists who have participated in these events include saxophonists Mark Turner and Joel Frahm, pianist Aaron Goldberg, and trumpeter Avishai Cohen.

== See also ==
- Music of Israel
- Buchmann-Mehta School of Music
- Music education
