= Roy Assaf =

Roy Assaf may refer to:

- Roy Assaf (actor) (born 1979), Israeli actor
- Roy Assaf (choreographer) (born 1982), Israeli dancer and choreographer
- Roy Assaf (musician) (born 1982), Israeli musician
