= Hila Oren =

Israeli nonprofit executive and urbanism researcher

- הלה אורן
- Born: March 13, 1966 (age 60)
- Education: BA, MBA – Tel Aviv University; PhD, Geography and Environmental Studies – University of Haifa
- Occupations: Nonprofit executive, urbanism and city-branding researcher
- Employer: Tel Aviv Foundation
- Known for: CEO of the Tel Aviv Foundation; founder of the Ir Olam directorate; chair of the Forum of Urban Foundations
- Children: 3

Hila Oren (Hebrew: הלה אורן; born 13 March 1966) is an Israeli urbanism researcher who has served as CEO of the Tel Aviv Foundation since 2016. She previously founded and directed the Ir Olam ("Global City") directorate at the Tel Aviv-Yafo Municipality. In May 2025, she was elected chair of the Forum of Urban Foundations.

== Biography ==
Oren served as a soldier teacher at the Shkedim field school of the Society for the Protection of Nature in Israel.

Oren holds a bachelor's degree and a master's degree in business administration from Tel Aviv University. She completed an executive program at the Harvard Kennedy School and is an alumna of the Wexner Foundation's Senior Leadership Program. In 2019, she completed a PhD in Geography and Environmental Studies at the University of Haifa, under the supervision of Professor Maoz Azaryahu. Her dissertation examined the branding of Tel Aviv between 2000 and 2015.

At age 25 she founded a leisure business called "Hofesh" ("Freedom"), and later founded "Chamesh", a municipal company for education and leisure in Shoham. She then served as vice president for tourism at the Society for the Protection of Nature in Israel.

Oren teaches "The Ergonomic City" at the Azrieli School of Architecture at Tel Aviv University.

At Sami Shamoon College of Engineering, she is a researcher at the NUR (Negev Urban Research) Lab, an urban innovation laboratory working in collaboration with the MIT Media Lab and Ben-Gurion University of the Negev. She also lectures on urbanism, smart cities, city branding, urban identity and public spaces. She previously served as a thinker-in-residence in Christchurch, New Zealand, and as a research fellow in Barcelona.

She established and was CEO of Tel Aviv Global, was the General Director of Tel Aviv Centennial Administration, and the Director of Tourism Operations for the Society for the Protection of Nature in Israel. She currently sits on the board of Neot Kedumim, Port of Haifa, and Vertigo Dance Troupe.

=== Tel Aviv-Yafo Municipality ===
In 2008, Oren was appointed to head the Tel Aviv Centennial Administration, which was responsible for organizing the city's centennial celebrations in 2009. The administration's planning involved public participation and highlighted the city's cultural, social and urban life.

In 2010, Oren founded and directed the Ir Olam ("Global City") directorate at the Tel Aviv-Yafo Municipality. The directorate worked to enhance the city's international standing, attract entrepreneurs, investors, tourists and students, and strengthen connections between the municipality and the city's business community. As part of this effort, Tel Aviv was promoted as a "Startup City".

In 2013, the municipal tourism association's activities were merged into the directorate, and Oren took charge of the combined organization.

=== Tel Aviv Foundation ===
In 2016 Oren was appointed CEO of the Tel Aviv Foundation, which raises donations and promotes urban projects. During her tenure the foundation's activity expanded beyond the construction of buildings and facilities to social programs and content, and its outreach to Israeli donors and the local business sector grew.

During the COVID-19 pandemic, the foundation partnered with the company Colu to support local businesses by encouraging purchases within the city.

Following the outbreak of the Gaza war, the foundation expanded its activities to assist evacuees and communities outside Tel Aviv–Yafo. In a 2024 interview, Oren described working with the municipality of Sderot to plan the allocation of donations and establish a municipal community space. She also described assistance to the communities of Netiv HaAsara, Re'im and Be'eri, including the reconstruction of the Be'eri art gallery with funding donated by the German government.

In 2026 she led the foundation's efforts to promote the new campus of the Reuth Medical and Rehabilitation Center at Sde Dov.

At the foundation, Oren promoted "Health Pockets" (Kisei Briut), a concept she coined as part of her research, combining the design of public spaces with health-related activities to encourage community interaction and reduce loneliness. According to an April 2026 article in Globes, the initiative was developed by Oren in partnership with the company Publica and with the guidance of Professor Anat Brunstein Klomek of Reichman University. It incorporates gardens, seating areas and activities such as community gatherings and "listening benches", as part of an approach to health-promoting architecture.

In a column published in Portfolio in November 2025, Oren wrote that she had presented the model at the Venice Biennale of Architecture the previous month. She described its development in collaboration with Brunstein Klomek and Sharon Blum-Melamed, director of the Social Services Administration at the Tel Aviv–Yafo Municipality.

Oren has spoken at international conferences, including the 2023 SNF Nostos Conference and events of the World Jewish Congress.

== Other public roles ==
Oren is a founder of the Forum of Urban Foundations, which promotes cooperation among development foundations in local authorities. Since May 2025 she has chaired the forum, alongside its president, Amram Mitzna.

Oren previously served on the board of directors of the Port of Haifa and Amidar, Israel's public housing company, as well as on the governing bodies of Neot Kedumim and the Vertigo Dance Company.

She has written opinion pieces in The Jerusalem Post on philanthropy, gender-sensitive urban planning and the social role of public spaces, as well as columns in Anashim U'Machshevim, Portfolio and Ice on philanthropy and the relationship between public space and community resilience.

== Personal life ==
Oren is the mother of three children and lives in Kfar Vitkin, in the Emek Hefer Regional Council.
