= Yair Vardi =

Israeli dancer and choreographer (1948–2025)

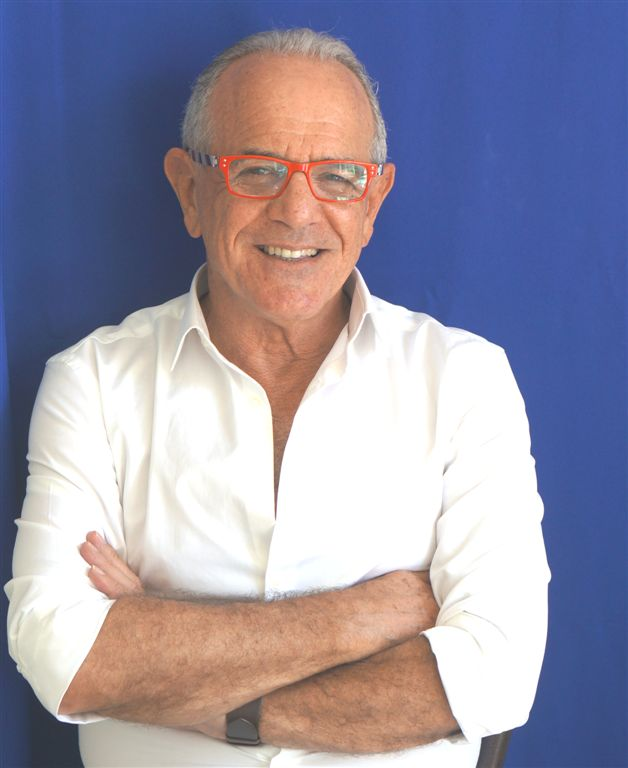
Yair Vardi

Yair Vardi (Hebrew: יאיר ורדי; 29 May 1948 – 25 May 2025) was an Israeli dancer and choreographer who was a member of the second generation of the Batsheva Dance Company. He was the Director of the Suzanne Dellal Centre for Dance and Theatre.

== Life and career ==
Vardi was born in May 1948, in Kibbutz Kfar Blum in the Upper Galilee. In 1977 he was awarded the Kinor David Prize. He danced with Ballet Rambert in London and later started his own company, English Dance Theatre, as well as a center for dance called Dance City in Newcastle, England. After 12 years away from Israel, he returned to become the Director of the Suzanne Dellal Centre upon its founding.

Vardi died on 25 May 2025, at the age of 76.

== Awards ==
Vardi was awarded numerous distinctions, among them:

- The Kinor David Prize (1977)
- The Tel Aviv Municipality Honor and Achievement in the Arts (2002)
- Shield of Honor for exceptional contribution to the exporting of Israeli Culture, Ministry of Foreign Affairs (2009)
- Chevallier de l'Ordre des Arts et des Lettres, by the French Government (2009)
- EMET Prize for Science, Art and Culture, sponsored by the Prime Minister of Israel (2010)
