= Haim Gamzu =

- חיים גמזו
- Born: 1910; Chernihiv, Russian Empire (now Ukraine)
- Died: 1982 (aged 71–72)
- Education: Sorbonne, University of Vienna
- Occupations: Art critic, drama critic
- Writing career
- Language: Hebrew

Haim Gamzu (Hebrew: חיים גמזו; May 18, 1910 – February 16, 1982) (also Haim Gamzou) was an Israeli art and drama critic, founder of the "Beit Zvi" Theater School and one of the founders of the Tel Aviv Museum of Art building on King Saul Boulevard.

== Biography ==
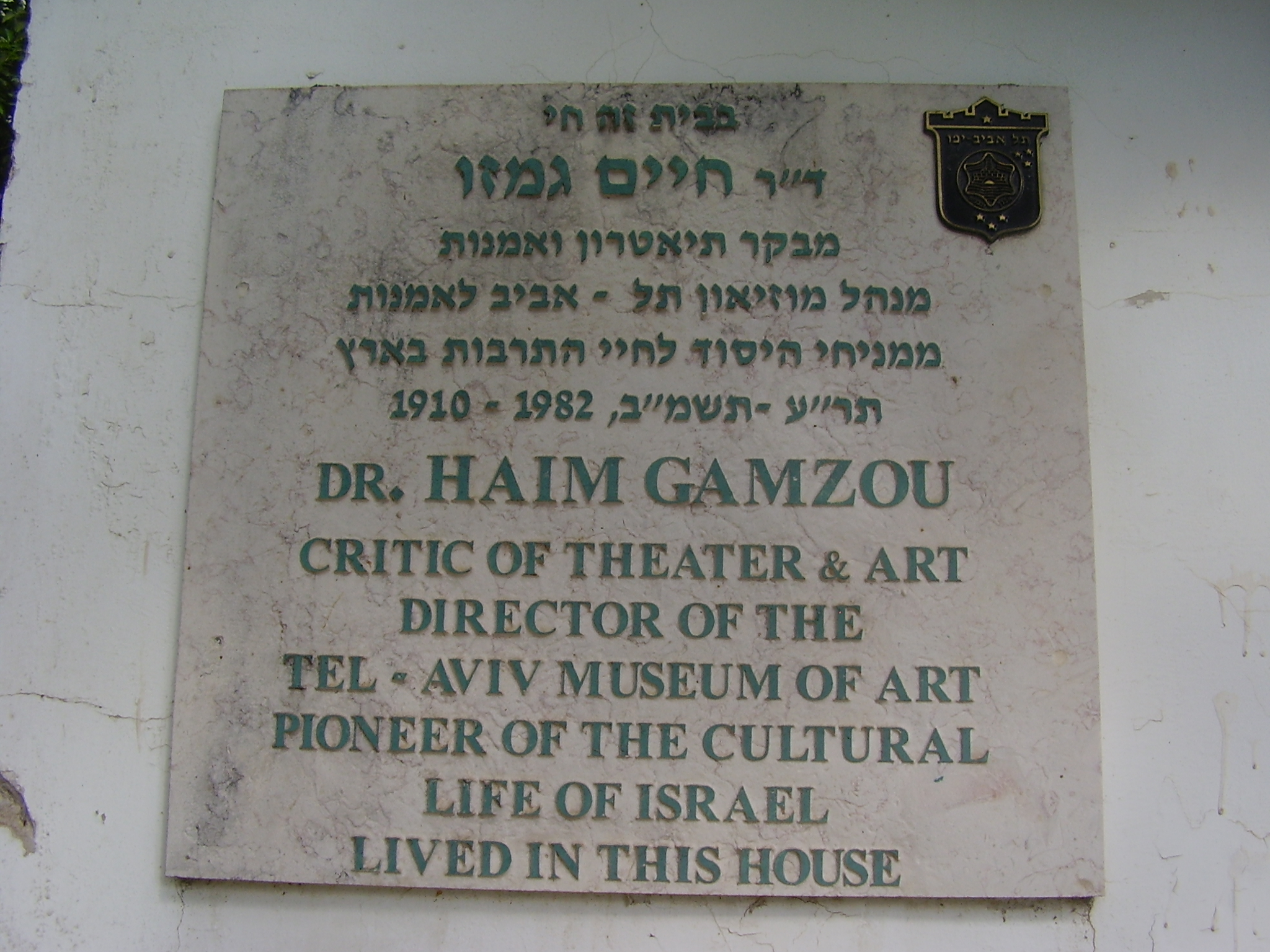
Memorial plaque, home of Haim Gamzu in Tel Aviv

Haim Gamzu was born in Chernigov, Russia (now Chernihiv) in the Russian Empire (now Ukraine) to Yerichmiel ben Rabbi Yaakov Gamzo of Pinsk and Lamosia, née Khotortsky. He began studying in a Hebrew school, and in 1923, his family immigrated to Israel, at the time Mandatory Palestine. In The British Mandate of Palestine, he completed his studies at the Herzliya" Gymnasium in Tel Aviv. There he fell in love with Hanaka Weinberg-Haruti and for several years sent her love letters. He then studied at the Institute of Fine Arts at the Sorbonne in Paris, and philosophy at the University of Vienna, from which he received a doctorate.

He wrote theatre and art criticism regularly for the Haaretz newspaper from 1942 until 1976. In 1947 he was attacked by a friend of an Actor from the Mi, Her, Him (Li La Lo) theatre and suffered a concussion.

In 1944, he wrote such a venomous criticism of the painter Isaac Frankel that the term "Legmaz" was introduced into the world.

He authored books in the field of fine arts, as well as a book describing his travels in South America, entitled "The Poetry of the Kitzel," which was published in 1949.

He founded the "Beit Zvi" School of Performing Arts in Ramat Gan in 1961, and directed it until 1962. He also served as director of the Tel Aviv Museum between 1947 and 1949 and between 1962 and 1976.

In February 1962, he received the rank of Knight of the French Legion of Honour for his contribution to the development of cultural ties between Israel and France.

Gamzo died in 1982 in Ra'anana and was buried in the Kiryat Shaul Cemetery.

The Tel Aviv Museum's Prize for the Advancement of the Arts is named after him. In 2003, a collection of his critical essays won the prize.

=== Family ===
In 1938 Chaim Gamzo married Greta nee Heim from Vienna. Their son, Yossi Gamzo, later became a poet, a songwriter and later a professor of poetry. Greta died in 1943. In 1948 he remarried, to Hava nee Schwartz. The couple had two children: Michal and Rafael. His son, Rafael Gamzo, a member of the Israeli Foreign Service, served as head of the Cultural and Scientific Relations Division (Keshtum) at the Foreign Ministry and as Israel's ambassador to Portugal. Chaim's (Michal's son) grandson, Yoel Gamzo, is a conductor.

Gamzo's sister, Tzipora Gamzo, married Judge Eliyahu Mani.

== Art history and theater career ==
Gamzu was appointed director of the Tel Aviv Museum in 1962. He established Israel's first theater school, Beit Zvi, in Ramat Gan.

Gamzu wrote several books on Israeli painting and sculpture, and worked for Haaretz newspaper as an art and theater critic.

Known for his acerbic theater reviews, Gamzu's surname was turned into a new Hebrew verb, ligmoz, which means to pan a theater show, and more generally – to kill. The term was invented by Ephraim Kishon.

== See also ==
- Theater of Israel
- Visual arts in Israel
