= Beit Zvi =

Drama school in Tel Aviv District, Israel

Coordinates: 32°4′42.27″N 34°49′18.17″E

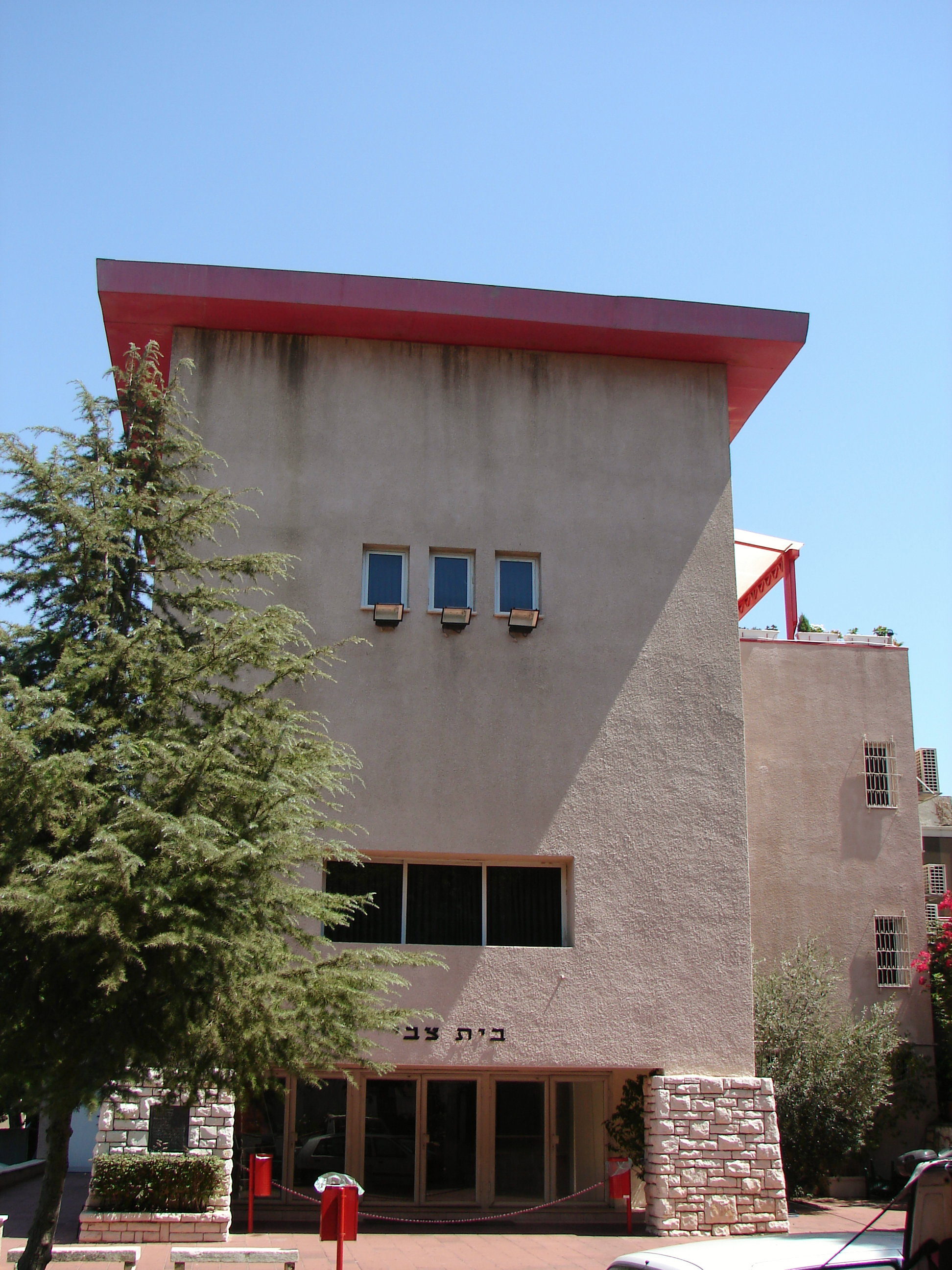
Beit Zvi School for the Performing Arts

Beit Zvi School for the Performing Arts, and Theater (Hebrew: בית צבי) is a school of acting and theatre arts, located in the Tel Aviv District city of Ramat Gan, Israel, founded and contributed in 1950 by the Klier family and is named after Zvi Klier, who fell in the War of Independence. The studies there last for about three years, with the final year students operating an active theatre with a diverse repertoire of plays, and at the end of which the students receive a diploma.

== History ==
Beit Zvi is the country's first theater school . founded by Haim Gamzu. Former director Gary Bilu established a theater for Beit Zvi graduates and mounted plays not put on by the repertory theaters.[1] The Beit Zvi Theater is, until now, one of the most popular and prestigious theaters in Israel, and the most famous actors in Israel have performed at the Beit Zvi Theater. It has five large venues which house over a dozen of productions a year. Beit Zvi's building was designed by Joseph Klarwein.

Beit Zvi offers a three-year program with an emphasis on acting in real productions. Micah Lewensohn, appointed head of the school in 2009, is the former director of the Israel Festival. Lewensohn plans to institute a BA degree and a program in television studies.

== Notable alumni and actors at the Beit Zvi Theater ==
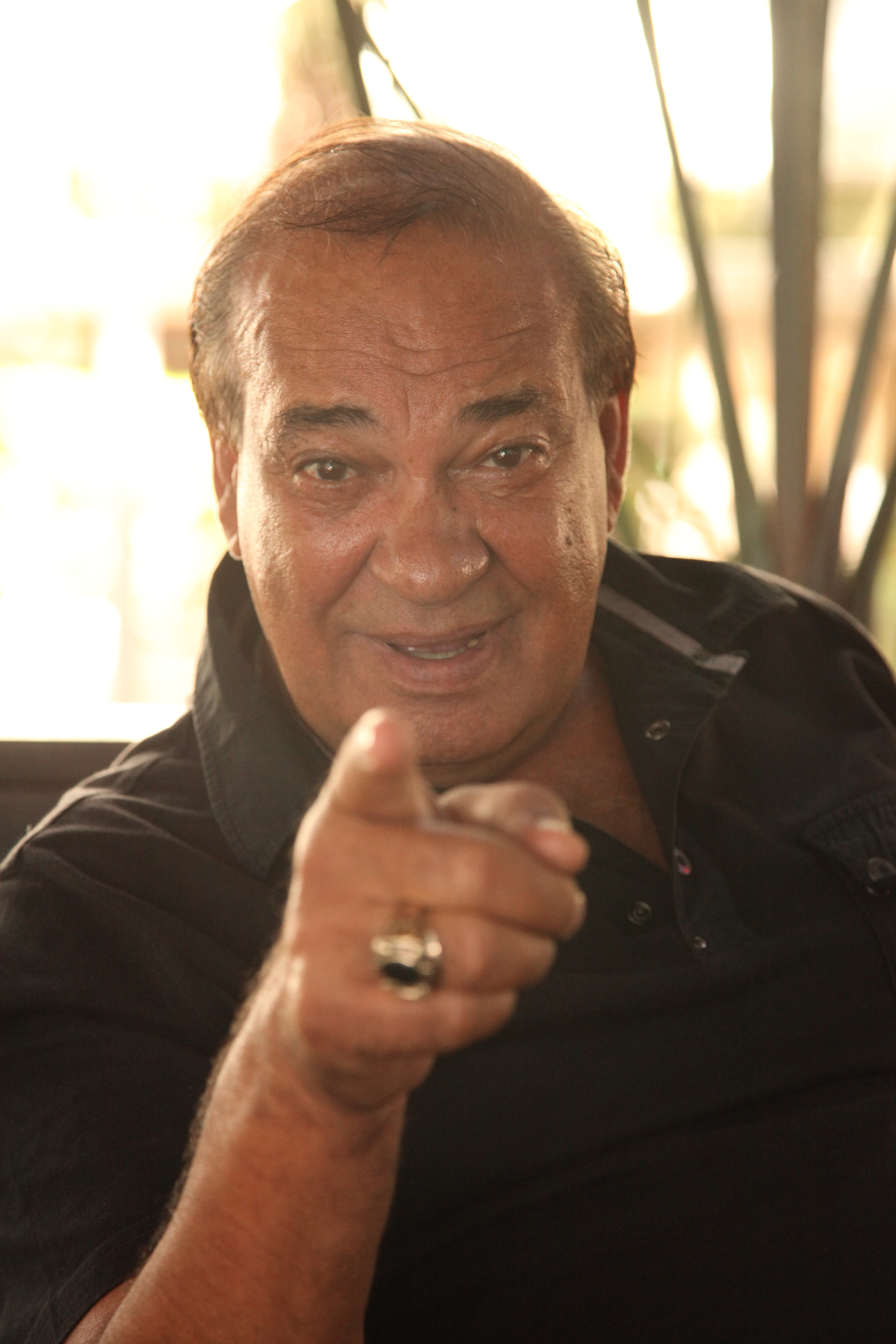
Ze'ev Revach

- Adi Ashkenazi
- Lior Ashkenazi (born 1968), stage and movie actor
- Shmil Ben Ari
- Naomi Blumenthal
- Liraz Charhi (born 1978), actress, singer, and dancer
- Doron Ben-David (born 1980), actor
- Tzufit Grant
- Amos Guttman
- Dikla Hadar
- Keren Hadar
- Samuel Maoz
- Ayelet Menahemi
- Rama Messinger
- Amal Murkus
- Khalifa Natour
- Ze'ev Revach (born 1940), comedian, movie actor, and director
- Yosef Shiloach
- Itay Tiran
- Amir Shurush (born 1984), actor
- Rita (born 1962), singer and actress
