= Jonathan Voltzok =

American jazz musician

Yonatan Voltzok (in Hebrew יונתן וולצ'וק) is one of the most dominant trombone players on the Jazz scene today. He received his bachelor's degree at the New School in New York City. His debut album "More To Come" (2008), which featured Slide Hampton, Ali Jackson, Aaron Goldberg, Barak Mori & Antonio Hart was well received by many including "The Village Voice" magazine.

== Discography ==
=== As Leader ===
- Two Spirits Dancing in the Dark (Outside In Music, 2018)
- More To Come (2008)

=== As Sideman ===
With Anat Cohen

- Noir (Anzic, 2007)

With Fat Cat Big Band

- Angels Praying for Freedom (Smalls Records, 2008)
- Face (Smalls Records, 2009)
- Meditations on the War for Whose Great God is the Most High / You are God (Smalls Records, 2009)

With Dan Aran

- Breathing (Smalls Records, 2009)

With Assaf Hakimi

- Some Other Day (2009)

With Eddie Henderson (musician)

- Eddie Henderson & Friends Play The Music of Amit Golan (Minton's, 2012)

With Yuval Cohen

- Hakol Zehavi - The Yuval Cohen Septet celebrates the music of David Zehavi (2014)
