= Roy Assaf (choreographer) =

Israeli dancer and choreographer

Roy Assaf (Hebrew: רועי אסף; born 1982 in Sde Moshe) is an Israeli dancer and choreographer.

== Biography ==
After working with Emanuel Gat from 2003 to 2009 he started developing his own choreographies in 2010. He made his New York debut in 2017 at Baryshnikov Arts Center.
