= Amit Golan =

Israeli pianist and composer

Amit Golan (Hebrew: עמית גולן; 1964 - 2010) was an Israeli pianist, composer, and jazz educator. Born in Haifa and educated first at the Jerusalem Academy of Music and Dance and then at The New School for Jazz and Contemporary Music in New York, he returned to Israel in the 1990s to teach the style. He was the founder of the Center for Jazz Studies at the Israel Conservatory of Music in Tel Aviv and performed with the Amit Golan Jazz Quintet.

== Life and career ==
Golan received his initial music education at The Jerusalem Academy of Music and Dance where he studied classical music and composition. After he finished his classical studies, he went to New York City where he discovered his passion for jazz. He was influenced by Bill Evans's playing, but decided that to understand Evans's technique he had to learn what influenced Evans himself. He then attended The New School for Jazz and Contemporary Music in New York and studied privately with "old school" players like Walter Bishop, Jr., Reggie Workman, Billy Harper, Jim Hall, Kenny Werner, and Barry Harris. He focused his studies on Jazz History, studying with Phil Schaap and Ira Gitler.

When Golan returned to Israel in the 1990s, he thought of working as a film composer. This plan was never accomplished because he immediately received an offer from The Thelma Yellin High School of the Arts to teach the Jazz History course and direct small ensembles. His course program spread over four years, covering the roots of jazz, moving on to Swing, Be Bop, and Hard Bop. While he was teaching at Thelma Yellin, Golan also taught at other schools. In 2001, he formed The Center for Jazz Studies at the Israel Conservatory of Music, Tel Aviv. Soon after, he collaborated with the New School to create a program where students could study for two years at the Conservatory, and finish their degrees in New York. Between 2004 – 2007, he was the music director of many jazz workshops, and he promoted jazz throughout Israel. In 2007, he directed the jazz series "Home" at Beit Avi Chai, Jerusalem, which held eight concerts featuring Israeli jazz musicians playing pieces he composed himself.

Golan died on December 3, 2010, from a cardiac arrest after collapsing during a basketball game with his music students. He was 46.

== Recordings ==
In 2007, Golan released his first CD, the hard bop album I Decided! which contained six original pieces by Golan and one cover of a Gershwin jazz standard and featured some of his old students: Asaf Yuria on tenor sax, Gilad Abro on double bass, Doron Tirosh on drums, and a special guest from New York, Joe Magnarelli on trumpet.

His second album, that was already composed, was planned to be recorded in 2011, but his sudden death in 2010 interrupted the plan. His friends decided to produce the album in his memory. Recorded in 2011 and released the following year, Eddie Henderson & Friends: The Music of Amit Golan features Eddie Henderson on trumpet, and eight more Israeli musicians, all friends, some of whom were also his past students.
