= Igal Bursztyn =

Israeli film director, screenwriter and film producer

- יגאל בורשטיין
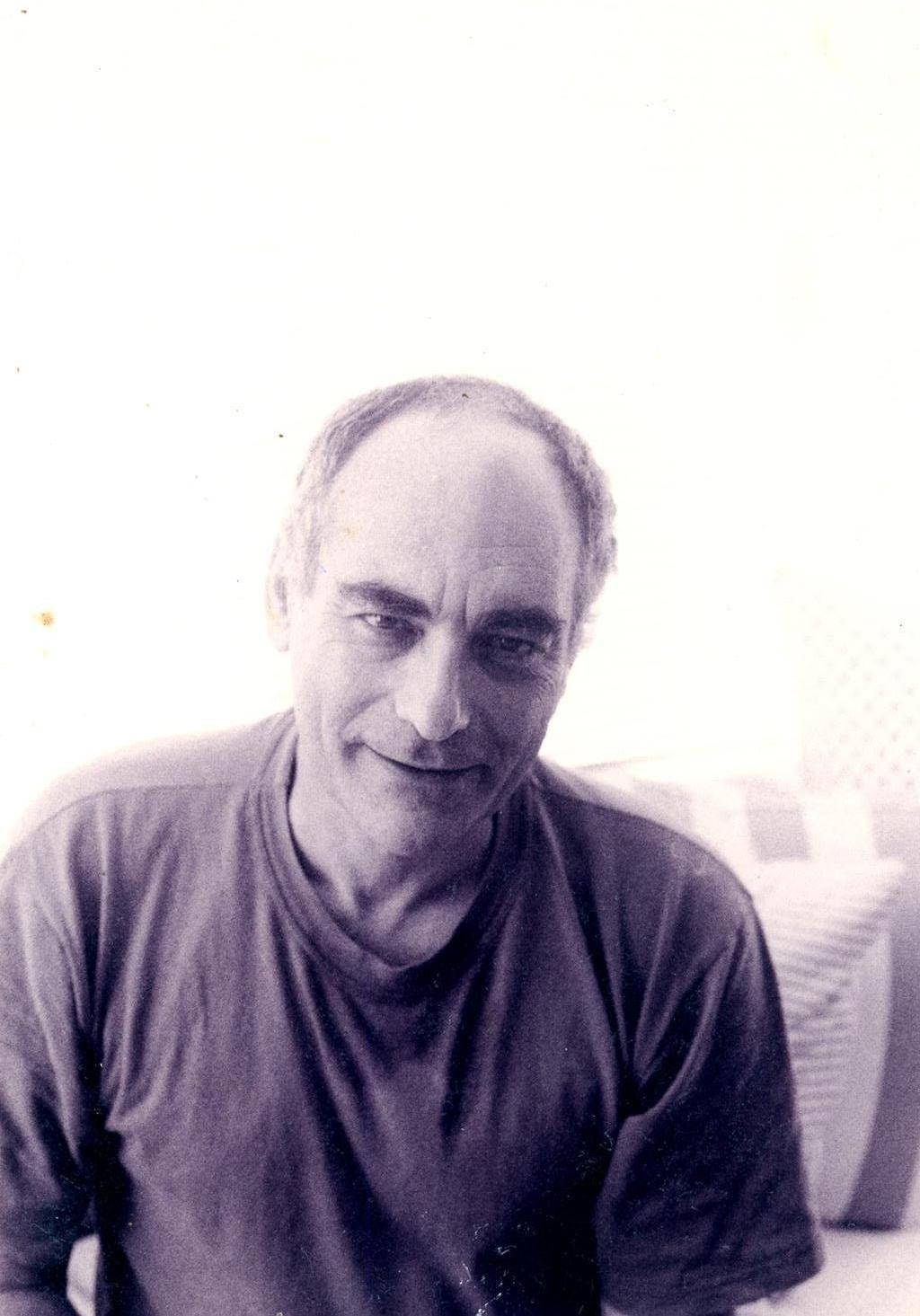
- Born: May 27, 1941 (age 85); Manchester, England
- Occupations: Film director, writer, producer, professor

Academic background
- Education: Tel Aviv University; London School for Film Techniques

Igal Bursztyn (Hebrew: יגאל בורשטיין; born May 27, 1941) is an Israeli film director, writer, producer and adjunct full professor at the Tel Aviv University Film and TV Department.

== Biography ==
Bursztyn was born in Manchester, England, his parents were born in Poland. In 1949, his family returned to Warsaw and in 1957 they immigrated to Israel.

His father was a scientist at the Weizmann Institute of Science (Chemistry, Polymer Department), his mother worked there as a librarian. After his military service (artillery) Bursztyn studied mathematics, philosophy and literature graduating (Tel Aviv University, 1966) in philosophy. In 1967 studied for few months at the London School for Film Techniques. During the years 1965-1967 wrote literary and film criticism for newspapers Al Hamishmar, LaMerhav, Haaretz and Keshet. During the years 1985-1991 wrote for Haaretz, Maariv and Ha'ir. He has been teaching at the Film & TV Department of the Tel Aviv University since 1973, received tenure in 1984, since 1995 was appointed adjunct associate professor, since 2008 full adjunct professor.

Bursztyn lectured and taught at the Danish Film School in Copenhagen, at the Film Studies Department of the New York University and at the Judaic Department of the University of Tennessee in Knoxville, United States.

In 1993 received the prize of the Minister of Culture for his contribution to cinema.

Bursztyn was married to the Habima actress Yael Drouyanoff with whom he had two children. Today he is married to Ruta Cohen, the administrative manager of a sex therapy clinic.

== Select filmography ==
- 2008 Out of the Blue, (Etzbah Elohim), 90 min., with Moshe Ivgi and Alon Aboutbul. Seven Nominations for Ofir Academy Award, wins Award for Music. Jerusalem International Film Festival Award for Best Performance
- 2006 Guide for the Perplexed, 50 min., TV documentary on Moses Maimonides
- 2002 The Glow (Zimzum), 86 min., with Tinkerbel, Assi Dayan, Best Feature Film Award, Haifa International Film Festival
- 1999 Smoke Screen, 50 min. TV documentary on Ariel Zilber
- 1997 Everlasting Joy, 88 min. with Ariel Zilber, Ofir Academy Award for Script, Lipper Award and Mediterranean Honorary Citation at the Jerusalem International Film Festival, Critics Choice at the Haifa International Film Festival for Best Film of the Year.
- 1993 Letters to Felice, 28 min., documentary. Opens Amsterdam International Documentary Film Festival
- 1992 Ethics V, 26 min., experimental, Golden Horse Award at the Larissa International Short Film Festival; Best Israeli Short of the Year Award by Israeli Film Institute
- 1987 War Copybooks, 180 min., 3 part TV documentary serial on 1948 Arab–Israeli War
- 1984 The Passion of Dr. Wider, 30 min. with Misha Asherov, an episode in "Israel 1984" produced by Tzavta
- 1984 Villa, 30 min. documentary, an episode in "Israel 1984".
- 1979 Displaced Persons, 80 min., documentary on the 1947 illegal ship "Lo Tafkhidunu"
- 1978 Belfer, 90 min. comedy with Gadi Yagil and Avner Hizkyahu
- 1974 The Riddle of the Sinai Mountain, 56 min., documentary. Film Institute Award for the Best Israeli Documentary of the year.
- 1970 Every New Immigrant (Kol Oleh ve Oleh) together with David Perlov, Avraham Hefner, David Kedem, 20 min., for the Ministry of Absorption.
- 1969 The Fall of Mr. Fikus, 20 min., comedy with Israel Gurion, Hugo Yarden, Shoshik Shani, Jacqueline Cronenberg
- 1968 Louise, Louise! 15 min., comedy with Israel Gurion and Rina Ganor, Awarded Best Israeli Short of the Year.

== Books ==
- 2009 INTIMATE GAZES, Magnes Hebrew University and Haifa University Press, Jerusalem, Bahat Award for Best Non-fiction of the year
- 2004 DOCUMENTATION, FICTION, DOCUMENTARY, Sal Tarbut, Tel Aviv
- 1998 DE-CODING, INTERPRETATION & SEDUCTION, Sal Tarbut, Tel Aviv
- 1998 FILM, LITERATURE, CIVIL WARS OF CULTURE, Agaf Tochniot Limudim, Jerusalem.
- 1990 FACE AS BATTLEFIELD, Hakibbutz Hameuhad, Tel Aviv
