= Yasmeen Godder =

Israeli choreographer and dancer (born 1973)

Yasmeen Godder (Hebrew: יסמין גודר; born 1973), is an Israeli choreographer and dancer.

== Biography ==
Yasmeen was born and raised until the age of 14 in Jerusalem. As a child, she danced at Professor Hasia Levi-Agron's class, and ballet at Yaakov Lipshitz's in Jerusalem. Her first performance was an end-of-year dance at YMCA Jerusalem, when she was 6 years old. In 1984, at the age of 11, Yasmeen and her family moved to New York City. She graduated from the High School of the Performing Arts there, and received a scholarship at the Martha Graham School in New York City, where she would dance every Saturday when she was 14 to 17. Her first creation was heavily inspired off of Admon Zabes' letters. Upon finishing her studies, she returned to Israel, though returned to the United States for her academic studies, and received her BA in concert dance from the Tisch School of the Arts at New York University in 1997, where she presented her works for the first time, and at the same time studied in other institutions outside Tisch as well, among them Movement Center, where many concert dance teachers and artists with diverse opinions gather and discuss controversial concert dance issues.

After the completion of her academic studies in 1997, Yasmeen has been presenting her works in various places. The first place where she danced and presented her works was at Gowanus Arts Exchange. Following, she was invited to present her works at Duncan Center in Prague, Czech Republic. During her final year at Tisch, she worked on her piece A Car and a Bandage. Then, she created two new pieces, the solo pieces Ina's Wall and Ring Ding Round Zero.

Since 1999, she has been living in Tel Aviv. Her works have regularly been presented at the Suzanne Dellal Center in Tel Aviv, and extensively throughout the world, for example at Lincoln Center Festival in New York, Hebbel am Ufer in Berlin, the Place Theatre in London, the Montpellier Dance Festival in France, and many more. To date, Yasmeen has created a total of 8 long works (over 1 hour long) and 6 short ones (up to 45 minutes long), including "Green Fields" for the Batsheva Ensemble and "UNDER2", a Matanicola Production in Berlin. The company had recently won the Ministry of Culture's Prize for Small Ensemble for the performance of Singular Sensation. In 2014, Godder created her first site-specific choreography for the Petach Tikva Museum of Art, Israel as part of the exhibition 'Set in Motion' (co-curated by Drorit Gur Arie, and Avi Feldman). Following the exhibition, the first artist book dedicated to the work of Godder was published under the title: 'Extremum - Reflections on the Works of Yasmeen Godder'.

Yasmeen is the artistic director of her dance company, where she teaches concert dance since her return to Israel. She has taught concert dance in several art schools in Israel, among them the Jerusalem Academy of Music and Dance and Bikurei HaItim in Tel Aviv. In 2007, she established the Yasmeen Godder Studio at the Mendel Culture Center in Jaffa, and to this day all of her activity is based there, as well as it being where the company's offices are situated, where the company mainly rehearses, and where she mainly teaches nowadays.

== Awards ==
- 2009 – Rozenblum Prize for the Performing Arts, on behalf of Tel Aviv Municipality.
- 2006 – Mifal Hapayis Landau Prize for the Performing Arts
- 2004 – Rozenblum Prize for the Performing Arts, on behalf of Tel Aviv Municipality.
- 2003 – Ministry of Culture Young Choreographers' Prize
- 2002 – Israel Cultural Excellence Foundation Nomination
- 2001 – Ministry of Culture Young Choreographers' Prize
- 2000 – Choreography Grant of the New York Foundation for the Arts
- 1999 – Choreography Contest for Hasia Levi-Agron (on behalf of the Jerusalem Academy of Music and Dance) in Jerusalem Prize for Yasmeen's works Ilana's Wall and Say Goodbye Nicely
