= Suzanne Dellal Centre for Dance and Theatre =

Dance and performing arts venue in Tel Aviv

Coordinates: 32°3′38.84″N 34°45′51.25″E

- מרכז סוזן דלל למחול ולתיאטרון
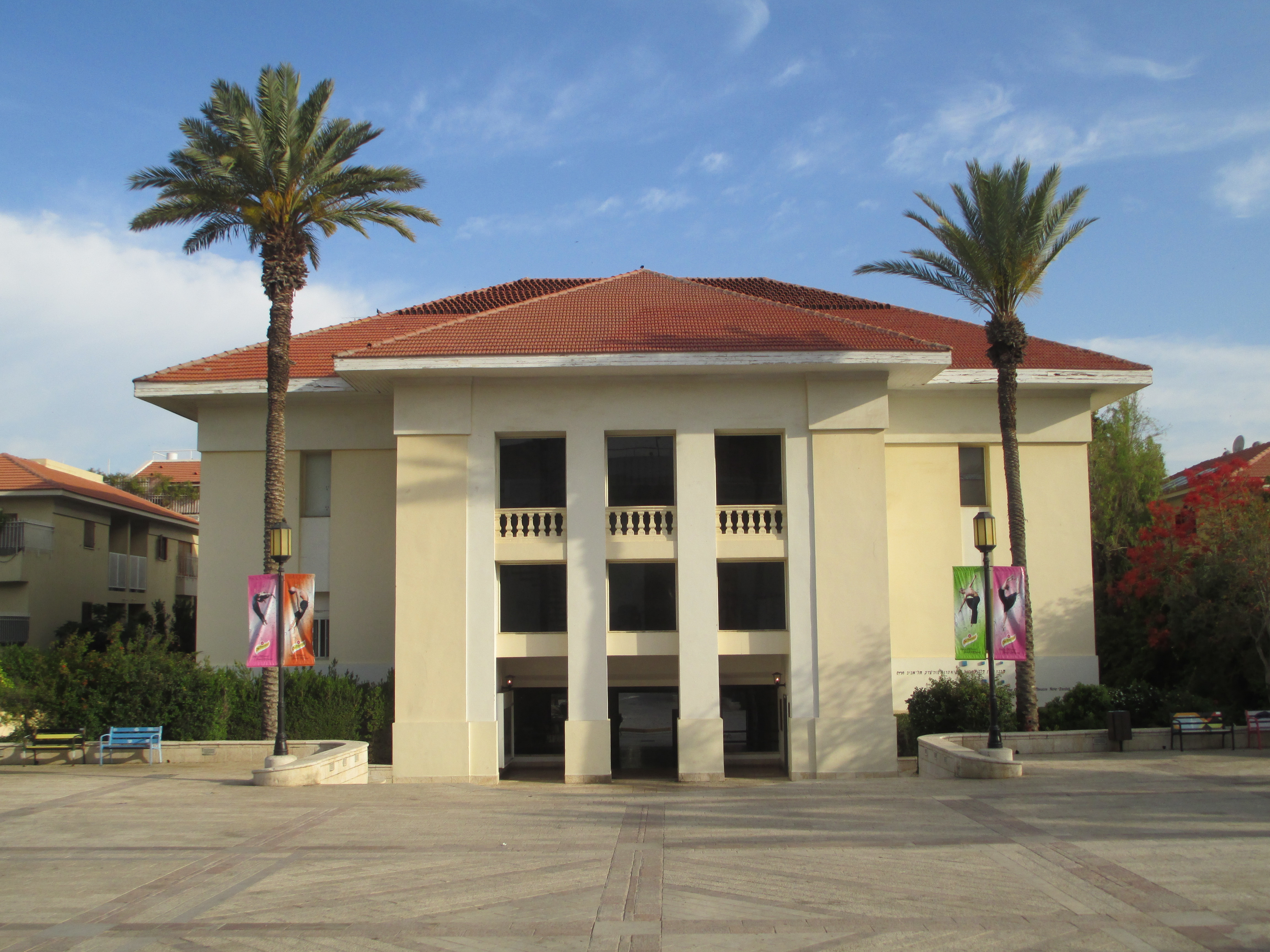
- Interactive map of Suzanne Dellal Centre for Dance and Theatre
- Address: Neve Tzedek; Tel Aviv; Israel

Construction
- Opened: 1989
- Rebuilt: 2017–2018 (expansion)
- Architect: Elisha Rubin

Website
- suzannedellal.org.il/en

The Suzanne Dellal Centre for Dance and Theatre (Hebrew: מרכז סוזן דלל למחול ולתיאטרון) is a centre for dance in Israel, located in Neve Tzedek, Tel Aviv.

== Goals and significance ==
The Suzanne Dellal Centre for Dance and Theatre presents Israeli and international contemporary dance companies. Established in 1989, the mission of the Suzanne Dellal Centre is to cultivate, support and promote the art of contemporary dance in Israel. The Centre pursues this mission by offering diverse performances, events, festivals, and workshops from the worlds of contemporary dance, theatre and performing arts.

The Suzanne Dellal Centre has two primary goals: to create world-class dance productions and engaging educational activities; and to facilitate high-quality presentation of Israeli and international choreographers.

In 2010 the Suzanne Dellal Centre was awarded the Israel Prize, the country's highest cultural honour.

== Resident ensembles ==
The Centre is home to three ensembles:

- Avshalom Pollak Dance Theater, formerly the Inbal Pinto and Avshalom Pollak Dance Company (2002–2018)
- Batsheva Dance Company, est. 1964
- Inbal Dance Theatre, Israel's first and oldest modern dance company, est. 1949

== Location ==
The Centre is located in the centre of historic Neve Tzedek, the first neighbourhood of Tel Aviv, located south of the Yemenite Quarter, near the Mediterranean Sea coast.

== History ==
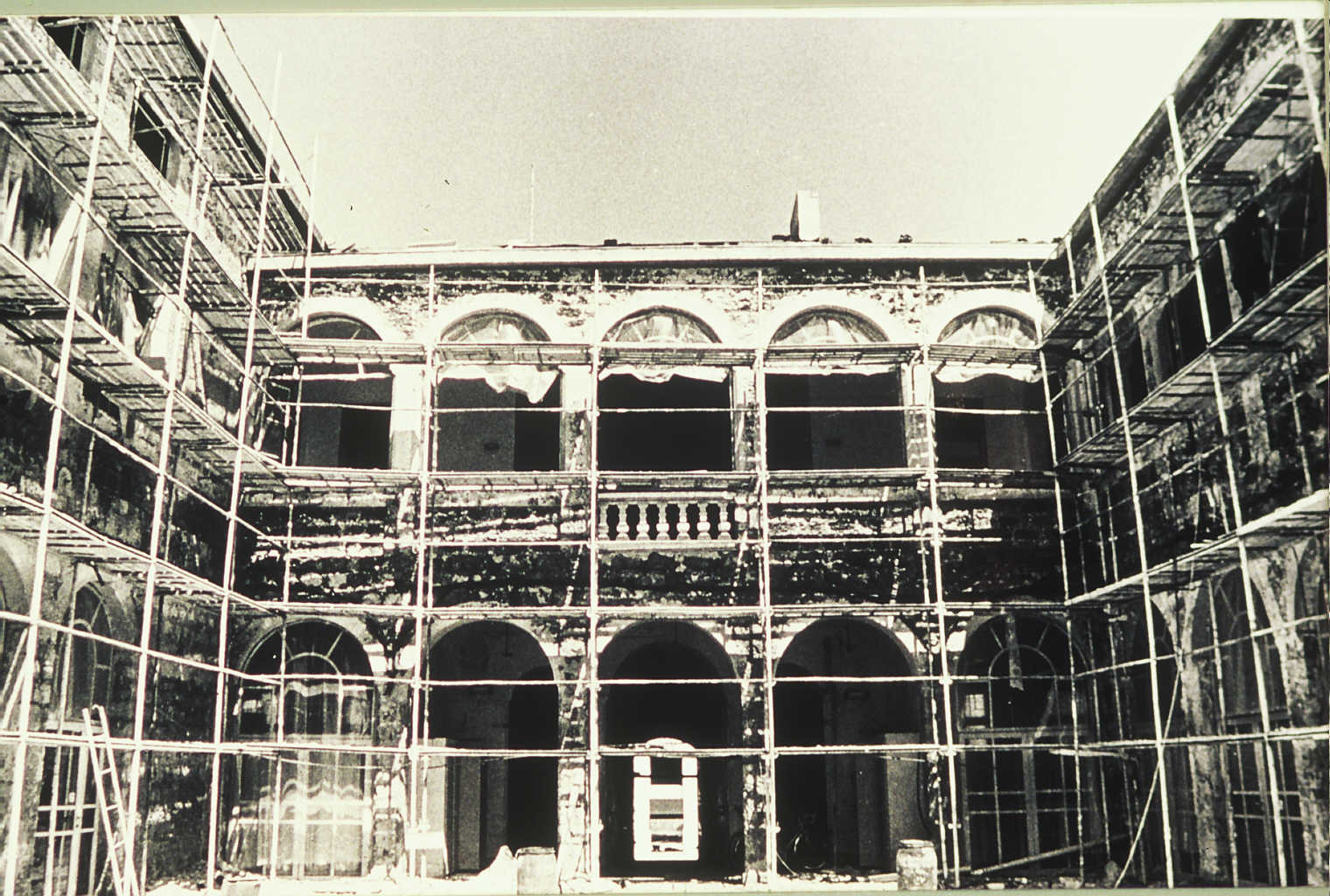
Yerushalmi Building 1989

The Centre was established in 1989 by the family of Jack Dellal of Manchester and London, in honor of Suzanne, the late daughter of Zehava (née Helmer) and Jack Dellal, as well as the Municipality of Tel Aviv-Yafo, the Tel Aviv Foundation (see homepage), and the Israeli Ministry of Culture and Education. Dancer and choreographer Yair Vardi was selected to lead the Centre's vision and became its CEO between the years 1989-2020.

=== Buildings ===
Three late-19th century school buildings, designated for preservation, were reconstructed and restored to create the performing arts centre, which was intended to give a home to contemporary dance in Israel and rejuvenate the neighborhood.

The original compound held the Yechiely Girls School and the Alliance School for Boys. In 1913, Seminar Lewinsky, Tel Aviv's first teaching academy, was founded nearby.

After World War II much of Neve Tzedek was left to decay.

=== Reconstruction (1980s) ===
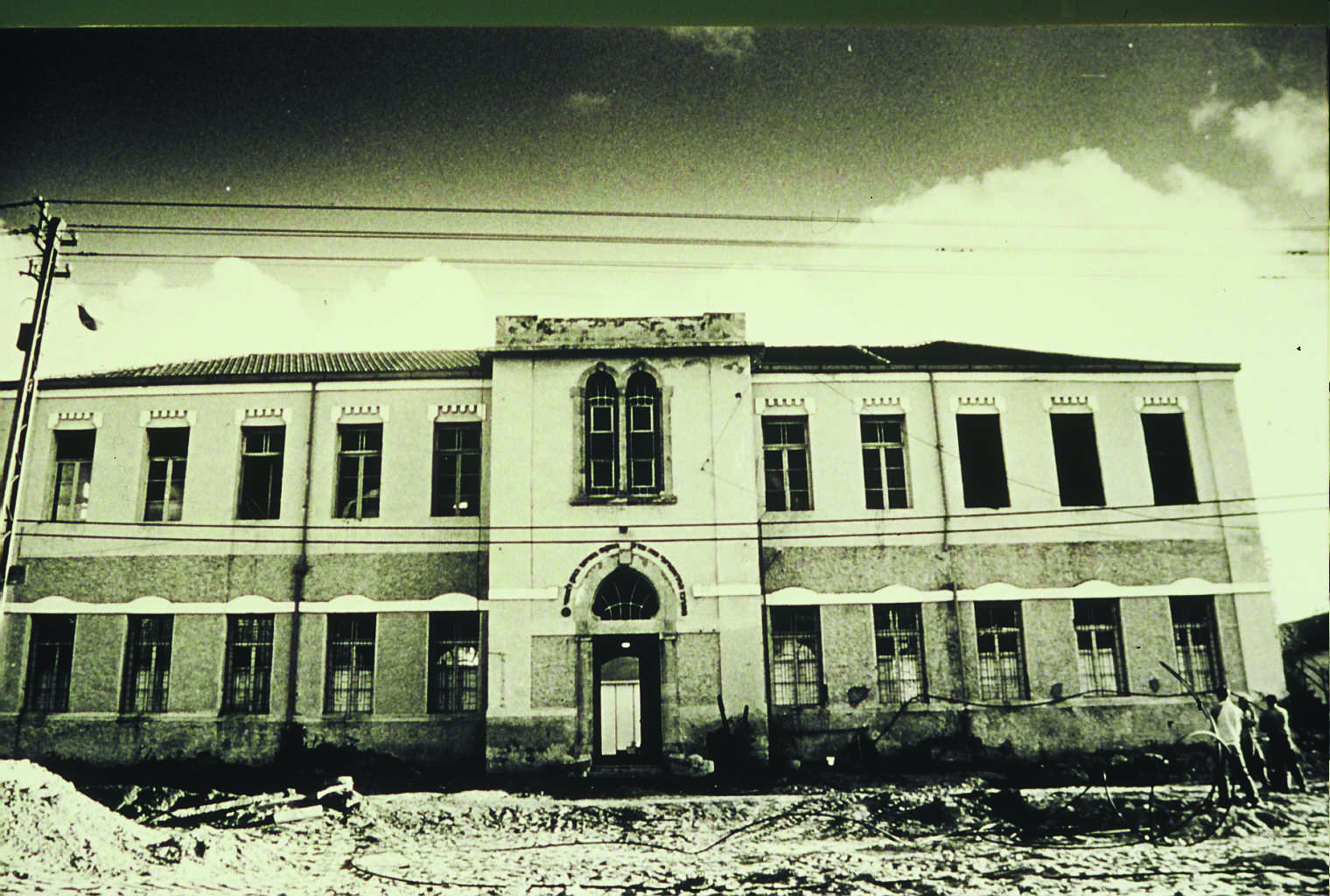
Yerushalmi Building 1989

In 1986 a plan was formed to revitalise the neighbourhood and rehabilitate the compound to build the Suzanne Dellal Centre, a dance centre the likes of which had not been seen in Israel. Most of the buildings were empty and in derelict condition and the Lewinsky Seminar building had collapsed. The Girls School was empty except for a theatre group run by Oded Kotler and Miki Yerushalmi operating out of the second floor. In between these the buildings ran Yechieli Street. In the "backyard" was a small building where the Inbal Dance Company, founded by Sara Levi-Tanai, would practice.

The intention of the construction was to preserve as much of the original buildings as possible. The main building's the façade was reinforced, the internal walls demolished and redesigned according to the needs of the future theatre. Other buildings were preserved or rebuilt as a copy of the originals. The building intended for the Batsheva Dance Company, located across from the well, is a new building, but its design was intended to create a continuation of the surrounding buildings. The construction materials, both in and around the buildings, maintain in colour and detail the historic quality and atmosphere of the location.

The Suzanne Dellal complex was envisioned to allow movement with no obstruction. The entire ground floor was levelled to allow the public to move freely at all hours of the day, even when there are activities in the theatres. The project's architect, Elisha Rubin, petitioned the Tel Aviv municipality to remove Yechieli Street where it ran between the two main buildings of the compound. Once approval was granted, the walls and gates which fenced in the two schools were taken down and the buildings were brought together around one central square, which serves as an active courtyard and pedestrian walkway.

The Centre was designed with a walking route which would connect Tel Aviv's Jaffa Road from the east with the beach to the west. The path begins on Jaffa Road and continues over the bridge on Aharon Chelouche Street to Amzaleg Street, then cuts through the courtyards, past the water well (discovered during construction), across the main square and through the main building's colonnade. From the main building, the row of eucalyptus trees directs straight to Charles Clore Park and the beach.

=== Expansion (2017–18): the Zehava and Jack Dellal Studio ===
In 2017–18, the Centre underwent reconstruction, which included the addition of the new Zehava and Jack Dellal Studio, named in honour of the Centre's initial donors, Zehava (née Helmer) and Jack Dellal. The new flexible performance-studio space was built on the roof of the central building, above the Yerushalmi Hall. The added third floor contains a 400 square metre performance studio, with 100 seats and a glass wall opening to a large rooftop balcony. On the second floor there is an enclosed patio and a re-designed Yerushalmy Theatre.

== The Israel Prize ==
In 2010 the Suzanne Dellal Centre was awarded the Israel Prize, the country's best known cultural honour.

"In its 20 years of activity in Neve Tzedek, the Suzanne Dellal Centre has succeeded in uplifting the art of dance in Israel. The great many diverse artistic endeavours of the Centre have spawned a new generation of artists, creators, and performers in the field of artistic dance. Creative excellence on the Centre's stages has broadened, and continues to broaden, the circle of dance-lovers. The Centre opened the gates of the world's dance stages to the Israeli dance scene and allowed Israeli dance to make its mark on the world. Since its establishment, the Suzanne Dellal Centre has become the home and anchor of all artistic endeavours in the field of contemporary dance in Israel." -Gideon Saar, Minister of Education, Israel's 62nd Independence Day, Jerusalem, April 20, 2010

== Programmes ==
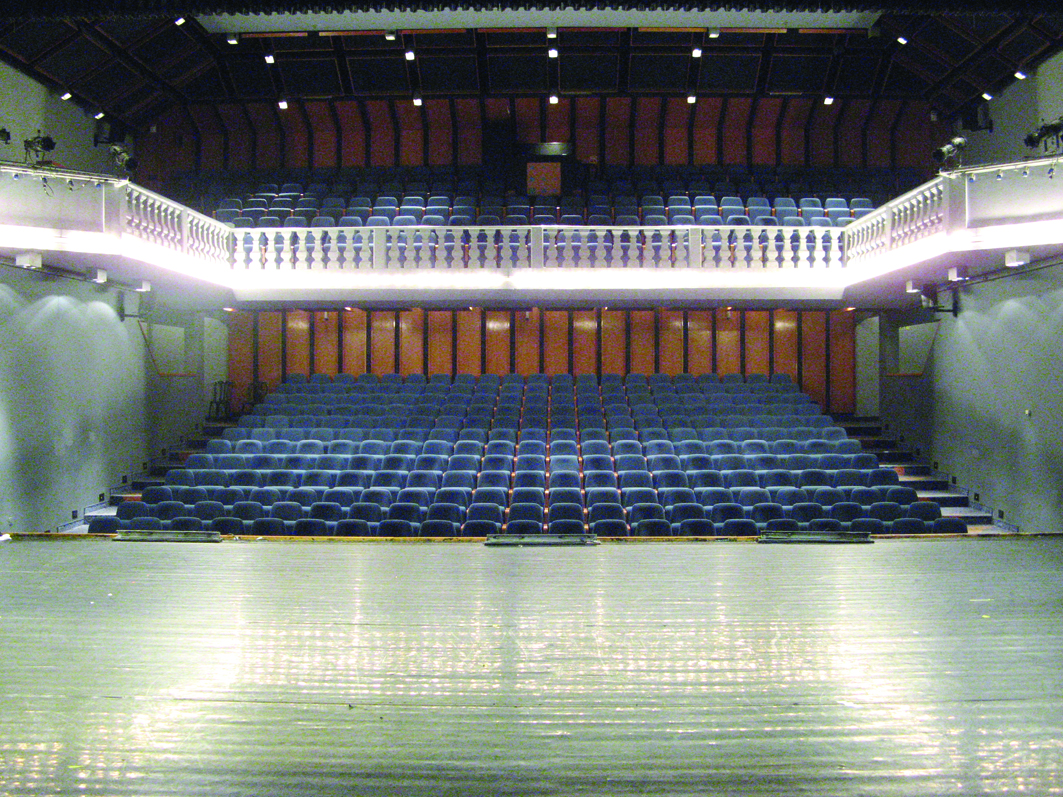
Suzanne Dellal Hall

The Suzanne Dellal Centre has initiated and hosted many of Israel's dance platforms.

=== "Shades in Dance" ===
Shades in Dance, Gvanim B’Machol in Hebrew, is a bi-annual mentorship program that pairs young choreographers with a professional artistic director to create a fully produced premiere that serves as the artist's debut into the Israeli dance scene. Many of today's top Israeli choreographers began their professional careers as part of this project, including Barak Marshall, Yasmeen Godder, Inbal Pinto, Emanuel Gat, Noa Wertheim of Vertigo Dance Company, and many more.

=== "International Exposure" ===
International Exposure, Hasifah Benleumi in Hebrew, is Israel's annual showcase of Israeli contemporary dance. Each year the Suzanne Dellal Centre hosts artistic directors, presenters, and curators of contemporary dance and performance from around the world. International Exposure presents a diverse program ranging from the most-established Israeli dance companies and choreographers to emerging, independent, and experimental dance artists. International Exposure is supported by the Ministry of Foreign Affairs of Israel, Division of Cultural and Scientific Affairs.

=== Tel Aviv Dance ===
Tel Aviv Dance is an annual festival at the Suzanne Dellal Centre which showcases leading dance companies and choreographers from around the world. Suzanne Dellal's international stage, which began with DanceEuropa in 1999, became Tel Aviv Dance in 2003. This festival is supported by the Ministry of Culture and Sports, Municipality of Tel Aviv- Yafo.

=== "Curtain Up" ===
Founded in 1989, Curtain Up (Haramat Masach in Hebrew) is Israel's flagship platform for the commissioning of emerging choreographers. It has become a centrepiece of Israel's contemporary dance calendar giving financial and artistic support to choreographers to present new works on a series of performances in Tel Aviv and around Israel.

== Suzanne Dellal productions ==
Over the years the Suzanne Dellal Centre has commissioned full-length works from selected choreographers:

=== Barak Marshall, Monger (2008) ===
A physical-theatre work for ten dancers, the language of Monger contains ethnic-contemporary motives, exploring the dynamics of hierarchy, power, dignity and the compromises one makes in order to survive.

=== Barak Marshall, Rooster (2010) ===
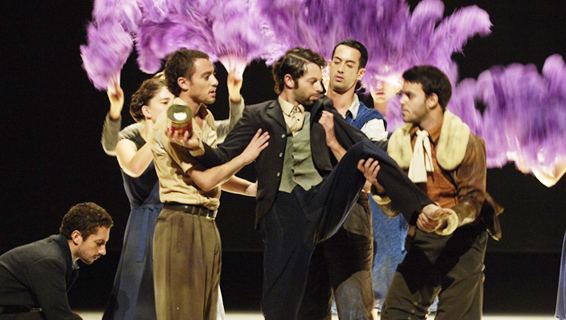
Barak Marshall Rooster at Suzanne Dellal Centre 2010

This work is based on I.L. Peretz's "Bontsha the Silent", Samuel Beckett's "Waiting for Godot", and several stories from the Bible and Yemenite folklore. A co-production of The Suzanne Dellal Centre and The Israeli Opera.

=== Renana Raz, The Diplomats (2011) ===
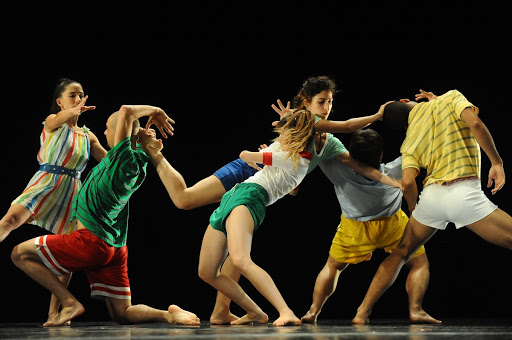
Renana Raz, The Diplomats 2011 by Gadi Dagon

The piece disconnects national anthems from their political patriotic context and suggests a more private and emotional interpretation. The body, which during the playing of the anthem is normally required to stay still, for the first time is granted the opportunity to dance to its melody.

=== Barak Marshall, Wonderland Part 1 (2011) ===
The piece follows the journey of ten souls stranded in a no-man's land, struggling to overcome forces - both personal and existential - in their attempt to create hope, find love, and find their way back home.

=== Itzik Galili, Man of the Hour (2016) ===
Man of the Hour is an opus in which the individuals who are part of our society search for the glory of the moment and for a piece of memory that will create a personal and national identity in an ongoing journey from an agonising cry to peaceful serenity. A co-production of the Israeli Opera and the Suzanne Dellal Centre and the Festival of Netherlands.

== Halls, studios, facilities ==
The Centre has a spacious multi-level campus consisting of four performance halls, rehearsal studios, restaurant and cafe, and wide plazas that host outdoor performances and events.

The list of halls and studios (incomplete):

- Yerushalmi Hall (full name:Yaron Yerushalmi Hall)
- Dellal Hall (full name: Suzanne Dellal Hall)
- Studio Zehava & Jack (full name: Zehava and Jack Dellal Studio)
- (?)

== See also ==
- Jasmine Dellal, UK documentarist
- List of Israel Prize recipients
- Eden Cinema
- Emanuel Gat
- Neve Tzedek
