= Emanuel Gat =

Israeli dancer

- עמנואל גת
- Born: March 7, 1969; Israel
- Occupation: Modern dance choreographer
- Website: Official website

Emanuel Gat (Hebrew: עמנואל גת) is an Israeli choreographer of contemporary dance.

== Biography ==
Une nuit au Musée du Louvre by Emanuel Gat

Emanuel Gat was born in 1969 in Israel. He discovered dance at the age of 23, after a workshop for amateurs, led by choreographer Nir Ben Gal. He started working at this period with Liat Dror Nir Ben Gal Company, as well as on his own projects. He created in 1994 his first solo, Four Dances on Bach’s music. In 2003, he received the Rosenblum Award for Performing Arts and in 2004, the Landau’s Award. In 2004, Emanuel Gat he founded his company, at Suzanne Dellal Center, Emanuel Gat Dance and also created Winter voyage and The Rite of Spring which premiered in France at Uzes Dance festival. The program was a huge success, and toured more than 300 times over the world. In 2006 this program was rewarded by a Bessie Award after its presentation at Lincoln Center, in New York. In 2007, he created 3for2007, composed of three pieces: a solo danced by Emanuel on a music of John Coltrane My favourite Things; a duet Petit torn de dança and a group composition for 8 dancers on a music of Squarepushers Through the Center. Also in 2007 he leftIsrael and settles his company in France, in Maison Intercommunale de la Danse, in Istres. Silent Ballet, a pièce in silence for 8 dancers was his first to be created in France. It was premiered in Montpellier for Montpellier Danse festival in 2008. In 2009, Emanuel Gat asked his long-time partner Roy Assaf to share the stage with him. They created an hour-long duet, Winter variations, also premiered at Montpellier Danse Festival. In 2011, he renewed with group piece and created a choreography for 10 dancers Brilliant corners for which he also composes the music, a first time. The pièce premiered in Venice for « Biennale di Venezia » and is still touring.

In 2013, Emanuel Gat was associated to the Montpellier Danse Festival. He proposed two new works : « The Goldlandbergs » and « Corner Etudes », a photographic installation « It’s people, how abstract can it get ? » and a choreographic event « Danses de Cour » in the Agora courtyard.

In 2014, Emanuel Gat returned to the Agora with "Plage Romantique" a piece for 9 dancers.

Emanuel Gat is regularly invited by dance companies to create pieces or to set his work. The last years, he was guest choreographer for: Opéra de Paris, Sydney Dance Company, Ballet de Marseille, Ballet du Grand Theatre de Genève, Ballet de Lorraine, Los Angeles Dance Project, Lyon Opera Ballet, among others.

== Works since 1994 ==
- 1994 : Four Dances
- 1996 : Polipopipop
- 2003 : Ana wa Enta and Two Stupid Dogs
- 2004 : The Rite of Spring and Winter voyage
- 2006 : K626
- 2007 : 3for2007 composed of My Favorite Things, Petit torn de dança Through the center.
- 2007 : "Trotz dem alten Drachen" / Tanztheater Bremen
- 2008 : Windungen for Suresnes Cités Danse.
- 2008 : Silent Ballet and Sixty Four
- 2009 : Hark ! created at Opéra national de Paris
- 2009 : Winter Variations / Emanuel Gat Dance
- 2010 : "In Translation" / Candoco Dance Company
- 2010 : "Satisfying Musical Moments"/ Sydney Dance Company
- 2010 : "Observation Action" / Ballet du Rhin
- 2010 : "The Revised and Updated Bremen Structures" / Tanztheater Bremen
- 2011 : Brilliant Corners / Emanuel Gat Dance
- 2011 : "Preludes & Fugues" / Ballet du Grand Theatre of Geneve
- 2012 : Organizing Demons / Ballet National de Marseille
- 2012 : Corner Etudes / Emanuel Gat Dance
- 2012 : It's people, how abstract can it get ? / Emanuel Gat Dance
- 2012 : Danses de Cour / Emanuel Gat Dance
- 2012 : Morgan's Last Chug / Los Angeles Dance Project
- 2012 : Time Themes / Royale Swedish Ballet
- 2013 : The Goldlandbergs / Emanuel Gat Dance
- 2014 : " Plage Romantique" / Emanuel Gat Dance
- 2014 : " Mondschein" / FTS - Folkwang Tanz Studio
- 2014 : " Sunshine" / Ballet de Lyon

== Awards ==
- 2003 : Rosenblum Award for Performing Arts
- 2004 : Landau Awaed
- 2005 : Israel Cultural Excellence Foundation IcExcellence
- 2006 : Bessie Award for « Winter voyage » and « The Rite of Spring »
