= Avraham Ben-Shoshan =

Commander of the Israeli Navy

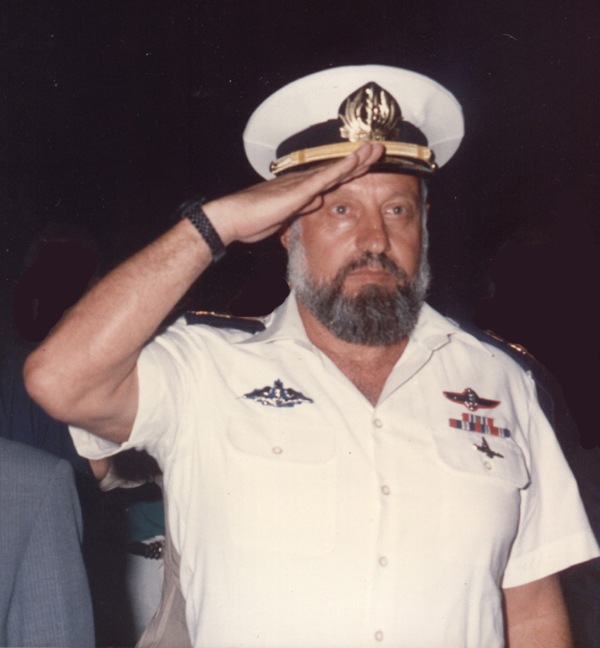
- Native name: אברהם בן-שושן
- Born: 1940 (age 85–86); Turkey
- Allegiance: Israel Defense Forces
- Service years: 1958–1989
- Rank: Aluf
- Commands: Commander of the Israeli missile ship fleet, Commander of the Israeli Navy,
- Conflicts: Six-Day War; War of Attrition; Yom Kippur War; 1982 Lebanon War; South Lebanon conflict
- Other work: member of the Prime Minister's Office Israel

Avraham Ben-Shoshan (Hebrew: אברהם בן-שושן; born 1940) was an Aluf in the IDF, and served as the Commander of the Israeli Navy in the years 1985–1989.

== Biography ==
Ben-Shoshan was born in Turkey to a Jewish family that made aliyah when he was six. The family settled in Kfar Saba. His family lived in poverty and, at the age of 14, he left his home and started working on a fishing boat. When Ben-Shoshan enlisted in the Navy, he joined the submarine unit, and eventually became the captain of a submarine. Later on, he served in the missile ship fleet and by the 1980s he became the Commander of the Israeli missile ship fleet. He was the commander of the missile ship fleet during the First Lebanon War. In 1985, with the rank of Aluf, Ben-Shoshan became the Commander of the Israeli Navy. In 1989, his term as Commander of the Navy ended and soon afterwards he resigned from the IDF.

After the IDF, Ben-Shoshan became a member of the Israeli government under Yitzhak Rabin, Benjamin Netanyahu, and Ehud Barak. In 2000, he became a member of the Prime Minister's Office Israel reform center which deals which creating reform in the public sector.

Ben-Shoshan has a master's degree in history, political science, and in strategy.
