= Daniel Akiva =

Israeli musician

Daniel Akiva (Hebrew: דניאל עקיבא; born 1953, Haifa, Israel) is a musician (guitarist) and composer.

Akiva studied with Haim Alexander and Haim Asulin at the Jerusalem Academy of Music and Dance in Jerusalem.

His compositional pieces are greatly influenced by the music of the Jewish Shephardic musical traditions of his native country. His project activities during 1983 with the singer Avraham Perrera, who is considered influential within that tradition, developed through that year by his involvement with the Kol Israel-Jerusalem Folklore music.

In 1987, the Swiss Confederation gave him an award for performances and composition, providing the impetus for continued study which he undertook at the Geneva Conservatory of Music, with studies of composition (Jean Ballissa) and studies from the lute with Jonathon Rubin. His work Mizmorim (psalms) won the ACUM Prize in 1990. Altogether his repertoire includes works from the Renaissance through to the 20th century.

== Recordings ==
( listings not complete)

- Sephardic Diwan with the soprano Eti Kahn
- Meeting with Avraham Perera; Ciclos, guitar and lute solo
- Siniza i fumo, for mezzo-soprano, recorder, flute, narrator, children's choir, guitar, and orchestra.
- Ciclos: Music of the Sephardic Jews
- Noches Noches
- Mizmorim (psalms)

== See also ==
- Jewish music
- List of Jewish musicians
- Music of Israel
- Porcupine Tree
- Secular Jewish music
