= Dikla Hadar =

Israeli actress (born 1981)

- דקלה הדר
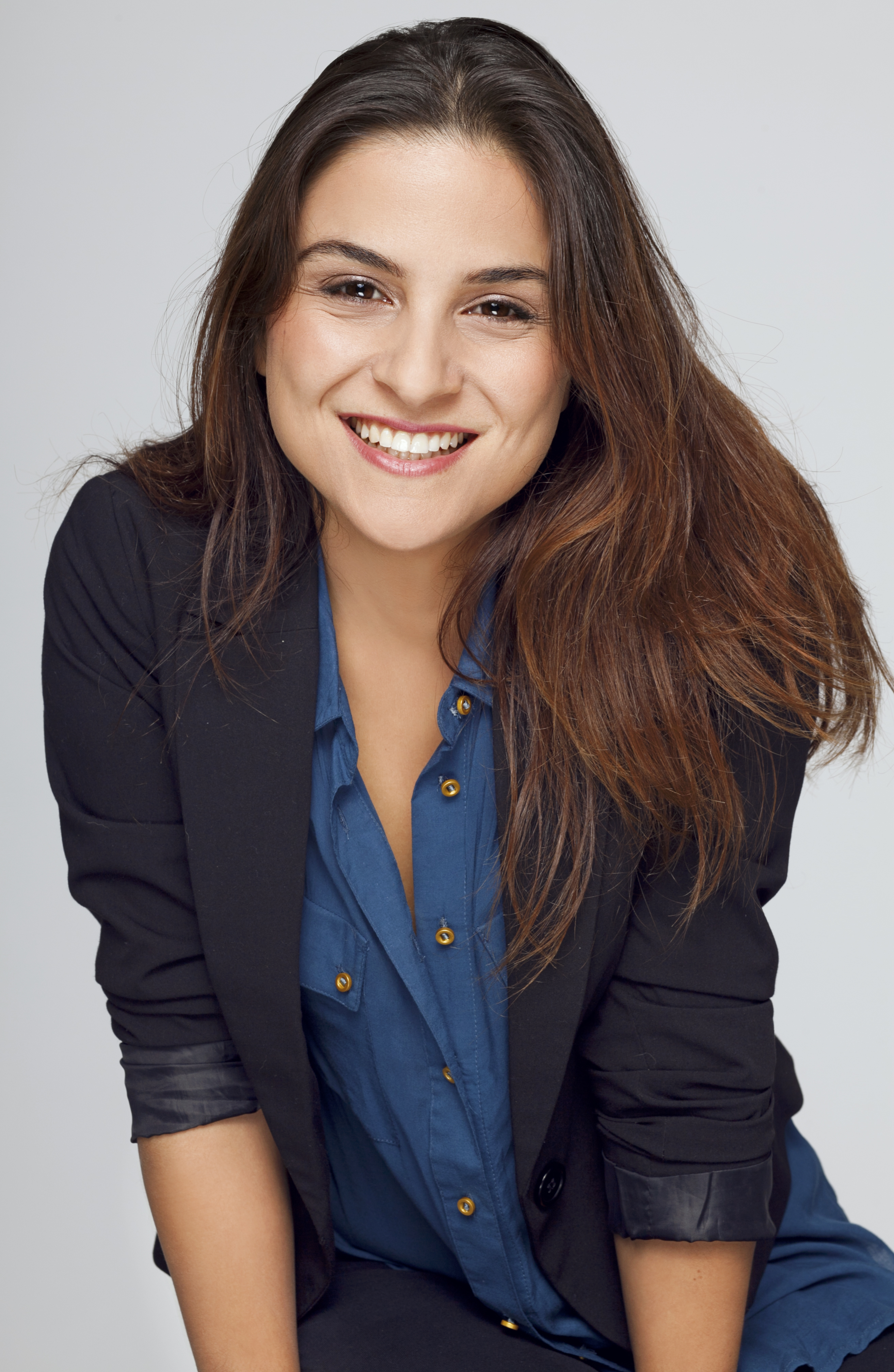
- Born: 10 December 1981 (age 44); Ashkelon, Israel
- Occupations: Actress; voice actress
- Years active: 2007–present
- Spouse: Shani Gruber (m. 2014)
- Children: 3

Dikla Hadar (Hebrew: דקלה הדר; born 10 December 1981) is an Israeli actress and voice actress.

== Biography ==
Born in Ashkelon, Hadar began her career on stage in 2007. Prior to that, she completed her studies at Thelma Yellin High School and was also a maintenance officer at Logistics Corps. As for Hadar's stage career, she has performed in cabaret shows in the Cameri Theatre and many other theatres across Israel. Many of these shows were directed by Gilad Kimchi. In 2009, she performed in a stage adaption of A Midsummer Night's Dream.

On screen, Hadar made her most earliest television appearance in 2011 but she is more known to the Israeli public as a voice actress. She performed the Hebrew voices of Viper in the Kung Fu Panda franchise, Rachel in Yogi Bear, Sam Sparks in Cloudy with a Chance of Meatballs, Elastigirl in Incredibles 2, Susan Murphy in Monsters vs. Aliens, Holley Shiftwell in Cars 2, Joy in Inside Out, Rosita in Sing, Kitty Softpaws in Puss in Boots: The Last Wish, Terk in Tarzan & Jane, Scuttle in The Little Mermaid, Chloe in Beverly Hills Chihuahua and she also voiced Princess Fiona in the Hebrew dub of Shrek Forever After, replacing Sharona Nastovich, Avatar Korra in The Legend of Korra, Pam-I-Am in Green Eggs and Ham, Shizu in Samurai Rabbit: The Usagi Chronicles, Trudy Proud in The Proud Family: Louder and Prouder

=== Personal life ===
Hadar is in a same-sex relationship and together, she and her partner Shani Gruber have a child born via sperm donation. They have three children.
