= Rivka Sturman =

Israeli choreographer

- רבקה שטורמן
- Born: Rivka Weinwurzel; 17 January 1903; Warsaw, Vistula Land, Russian Empire
- Died: 2001 (aged 97–98); Ein Harod, Israel

Rivka Sturman (Hebrew: רבקה שטורמן; 17 January 1903 – 2001) was an Israeli choreographer known for the creation of around 150 new folk dances.

== Life ==
Rivka Weinwurzel was born in Warsaw, which was then under the control of the Russian Empire, to Ya'akov and Genia Weinwurzel. She had six older siblings: two brothers and four sisters. In 1905, Weinwurzel's family moved to Leipzig, Germany, where her father worked as a lace merchant and her mother assisted with lace sales. As a teenager, she met choreographer Gurit Kadman. Weinwurzel completed high school at a Jewish school founded by Ephraim Carlebach.

In the 1920s, she studied in Leipzig to become a kindergarten teacher. She also studied agriculture at a farm near Berlin. She studied modern dance in both Leipzig and Berlin. While studying in Berlin, she met veterinary student Menahem Sturman, whom she would later marry. At this time she also joined HeHalutz, a Zionist youth movement.

Sturman visited Mandatory Palestine in 1925, staying with Menachem's family in Nahalal and Kfar Giladi. During her year-long stay, she encountered the hora as the primary dance of Jewish residents in the area. After returning to Berlin, Sturman studied anatomy and orthopedics and raised funds for Keren Hayesod.

In 1929, Sturman and her husband emigrated to Mandatory Palestine, where they lived in the kibbutz of Kfar Yehezkel. It was here that Rivka Sturman began choreographing dance pieces. Menachem became the veterinarian of the kibbutzim in the Jezreel Valley.

Sturman returned to Berlin from 1931 to 1933, where she studied therapeutic gymnastics. She returned to Kfar Yehezkel in 1933, and in 1937 she and her husband moved to Ein Harod. Sturman continued to study dance, now working with instructors in Tel Aviv, including Gertrud Kraus, Paula Padani, and Tehilla Ressler. Sturman began choreographing plays put on at kibbutz Geva. Throughout the 1930s, Sturman was also introduced to Arabic dance and music through Menachem's brother, Chaim, who spoke Arabic and was often invited to Arab celebrations.

Sturman and her husband had two children: Dalia (1934–1983) and Hayyim (b. 1938). Sturman died in Ein Harod in 2001.

== Folk dance creation ==
Sturman became interested in creating new folk dances in 1942, after seeing some of her daughter's young classmates dancing to a German song. At the time, Israeli dance primarily consisted of dances that had been created in diaspora, and largely in the Slavic and Balkan regions. The type of Zionism in En-Harod strove to "negate the Diaspora," so Sturman became inspired to create new Jewish folk dances for the residents of En-Harod and beyond. That year, Sturman choreographed her first folk dance, titled Ha-Goren (The Barn Floor or threshing floor), to music composed by Emanuel Amiran with words by Sara Levi Tanai. That dance and another, Ha-ro'im, was performed at Geva's high school graduation, among other newly invented folk dances.

Paula Padani and Gurit Kadman were early advisors and collaborators in Sturman's work. She asked painter Chaim Atar to make many of the dance costumes. Many of Sturman's early dances were created for children and for festival occasions such as Shavuot. She taught many of these dances to kibbutz children, and these experiences taught her how to vary difficulty in the dances while keeping a shared essence. Throughout her life Sturman was particularly interested in children having access to dance, believing it "was important for teaching a sense of rhythm, natural movement, comfort with one's surroundings, interpersonal connections and listening skills". She was an advocate for dance being taught in schools.

Sturman credited some of her early style influences to local Arab communities, particularly "the step-bend, the restrained, erect bearing, and the special abrupt rhythm", and referred to some of her dances as dabkes. Other influences included stories from the Hebrew Bible. By the 1950s, Sturman's dances were being influenced by Bedouin, Yemenite, and hasidic dances.

In 1944, she participated in the Dalia Festival at kibbutz Dalia, where young dancers from Ein Harod performed Ha-Goren and another dance (Sources vary, naming both Ani ro'eh tzoni and Rikud habe'er as possible performances). At the 1947 Dalia Festival, Sturman exhibited her dance Harmonica.

In 1947, a number of young men from Sturman's community were involved in a battle on Mount Gilboa, leading Sturman to choreograph a dance about their experiences, Debke Gilboa. She asked Emanuel Amiran to compose the music, to which he agreed. The dance was in part based on the Biblical story of the Battle of Gilboa.

In 1949, she choreographed Be-Mehol ha-Shnayim (Dance for Two) for a dance troupe composed of Palmach soldiers. The work contained two dances: Dodi Li , which was driven by a desire to create an Israeli tango, and Ve-Iti mi-Levanon. The work was Sturman's first to include the Yemenite step in its choreography. She had been introduced to the step while visiting a Yemenite Jewish refugee camp in Atlit.

Her 1951 work, Magash ha-kesef (The Silver Platter), was based on a poem of the same name by Nathan Alterman. It was a masekhet, or dance drama, rather than a folk dance. Sturman would create several other masekhet dances, including one called Gideon.

In 1965, she released the album Dance with Rivka through Tikva Records. In later decades, Sturman traveled abroad to countries such as the United States to teach workshops on Israeli folk dance.

== Works ==
=== Folk dances ===
- Ha-Goren (The Barn Floor, 1942)
- Ve-Hittifu he-Harim Asis (And the Mountains Shall Drip Wine, 1942)
- Hushu, Ahim, Hushu (Hasten, Brothers, Hasten, 1943)
- Kumah, Eha (Arise, My Brother, 1945)
- Harmonica (1945)
- El ha-Rahat (To the Drinking Trough, 1947)
- Kol Dodi (My Beloved's Voice, 1946)
- Ozi v-Zimrat Yah (God is My Song and Strength)
- Ani ro'eh tzoni (I am the Shepherd of My Flock)
- Debke Gilboa (1948)
- Be-Mehol ha-Shnayim (Dance for Two, 1949); composed of Dodi Li (My Beloved Is Mine) and Ve-Iti mi-Levanon (With Me from Lebanon)
- Le-Or Havazzelot (By the Light of Lilies, 1949)
- Be'er be-sadeh (Well in the Field)
- Im Hupalnu (If We Were Knocked Down, 1949)
- Hineh Mah Tov (See How Good, 1950)
- Zemer Lakh (A Song for You, 1950)
- Nizzanim Niru ba-Arez (Buds Are Seen In the Land)
- Megadim (Choice Fruits)
- Shu’alim Ketanim (Little Foxes, 1950)
- Magash ha-kesef (The Silver Platter, 1951)
- a-Yiven Uzziyahu (And King Uzziah Built, 1952)
- Ahavat Hadassah (Love for Hadassah)
- Horah Eilat
- Ve-David Yefe Einayim (David of the Beautiful Eyes, 1953)
- Yarad Dodi Le-Ganno (My Beloved Has Gone Down to His Garden, 1955)
- Zemer Atik (Ancient Song, 1956)
- Eh ha-Tal (Where Is the Dew, 1957)
- Eten Ba-Midbar (I Shall Plant in the Desert, 1959)
