= Leah Bergstein =

Israeli dancer & choreographer (1902-1989)

- לאה ברגשטיין
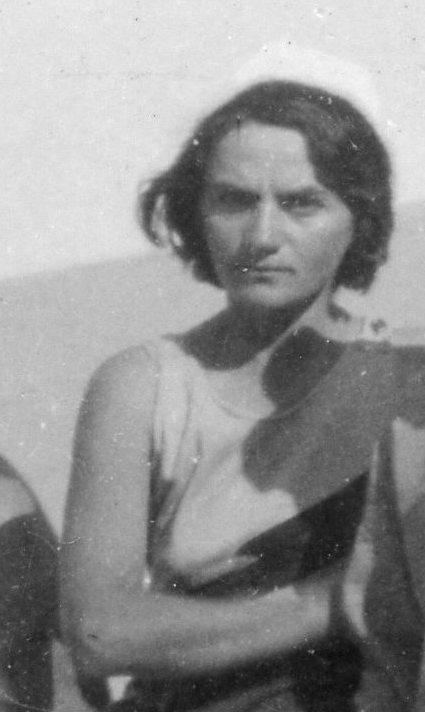
- Born: October 23, 1902; Bilshivtsi, Galicia
- Died: 1989 (date unknown); Israel
- Occupation: Choreographer
- Known for: Israeli folk dancing

Leah Bergstein (Hebrew: לאה ברגשטיין; October 23, 1902 - 1989) of Galician Jews origin was among the first choreographers in Mandatory Palestine who created festival dances at kibbutzim. Bergstein is considered one of the "mothers" of early Israeli folk dance, inventing a new style of movement and laying the foundation of folk dance emerging as an Israeli cultural tradition. She was the only professional dancer to work in the original folk dance movement at the time.

== Early life ==
=== Family ===
Bergstein was born in Bilshivtsi in Galicia (now in Ukraine). She was the daughter of Moshe Bergstein and Liba (née Shor). She had six siblings: David, Isaac, Effie, Haya Dirnal, Hannah Broner, and Rivka.

At the start of World War I in 1914, the Bergstein family fled to Vienna, Austria. Bergstein's parents emigrated to Mandatory Palestine in 1938.

=== Training ===
In Vienna, Bergstein studied modern dance with a colleague of Isadora Duncan. Bergstein studied the foundations of movement derived from Greek culture and dance. Bergstein said of this training, "We learned Greek dances and I saw from this the road of re-creation for the dances of Israel. I learned how to return."

Bergstein also encountered Anthroposophy, and building on that, Bergstein explored connections between word and movement in choreographing her first two dances. Through Steiner's Theosophy, Bergstein encountered Indian dance, discovering her natural affinity for Indian classical movement.

After taking courses studying to become a kindergarten teacher, Bergstein studied dance under Margaret Schmidt, a protegée of Rudolf von Laban. In the practices of Laban, Bergstein expanded her vocabulary of modern dance movement. She was also impressed by Laban's efforts to reimagine folk festivals, in reaction to its seeming decline, to enable people without prior technical knowledge to perform dances as a way of celebrating and expressing joy.

Bergstein continued her dancing career in the company of Vera Skoronel, a student of Mary Wigman, who had also studied with Laban. With the rise of anti-Semitism, however, Bergstein heard people comment on her Jewish surname and decided to leave professional dancing and embrace her heritage, including making aliyah. She began to feel more strongly that a developing a Jewish was as necessary as returning to the ancient homeland.

== Life and work in Palestine ==
=== Kibbutz Beit Alfa ===
Bergstein arrived in Mandatory Palestine in 1925 and joined Kibbutz Beit Alfa in the Jezreel Valley. In the gendered hierarchy of the kibbutz, she started working in the laundry, which posed difficulties for Bergstein as a dancer and a woman. Dancing was perceived as a secondary task to the "real" work: farming and construction for men, cooking and cleaning for women. Bergstein initially tried to rehearse after working hours but soon found that she did not have sufficient time to choreograph or rehearse. Despite the demanding and constricting responsibilities for their gender, women dance leaders' artistic contributions, including those of Bergstein, were seen as secondary in the Zionist movement.

The members of Kibbutz Beit Alfa began to learn about sheepherding and shearing from the surrounding Bedouin encampments and extended mutual invitations to festivals and other celebrations. When attending the Arab village festivity, Bergstein noted the ways in which women participated in the dabke, a traditionally male-dominant dance, from the Sheikh's wife's Laban-like sword dance and a girl's delicate walk through a circle of men dancing. She cited her observation of the Arab dances as an influence in creating folk dances in kibbutzim and moshavim. She was inspired by the nomadic culture's rich traditions of ceremonies, songs, and dances that were deeply connected to the earth and nature.

In 1929, the kibbutz shepherds requested that Bergstein create a festive event to celebrate the end of sheep shearing. Bergstein planned the festive event to accompany the shearing process, including songs and stories composed by the shepherds and performed for the kibbutz audience. The festival initiated Bergstein's collaboration with Polish-born poet-composer Mattityahu Shelem and marked the first nature celebration of the labor settlement movement containing a choreographic element. This celebration served as a landmark in the development of the kibbutz festival and Israeli folk-cultural life.

== Festivals ==
=== The Sheep-Shearing Festival (Chag HaGez) ===
Inspired by Bedouin traditions, Bergstein created a festival to accompany the end of sheep shearing. Bergstein choreographed to songs composed by Shelem, including "Se ugedi" (A Lamb and a Kid), "Sisu ve simchu na" (Be Joyful and Celebrate), "Ro’e ve ro’a" (A Shepherd and a Shepherdess),. Bergstein and Shelem aimed to recreate the holidays as described in the Torah, the first such revival since Biblical times. Bergstein created dances for the multigenerational community at Beit Alfa. She aimed for the celebration to be "like a prayer for the whole nation that everyone could dance." These dances were performed alongside the sheep pen. Beginning in 1929, the shearing festivity was only held for two consecutive years, but it is nonetheless seen as a turning point for creating kibbutz festivities.

=== The Omer Festival ===
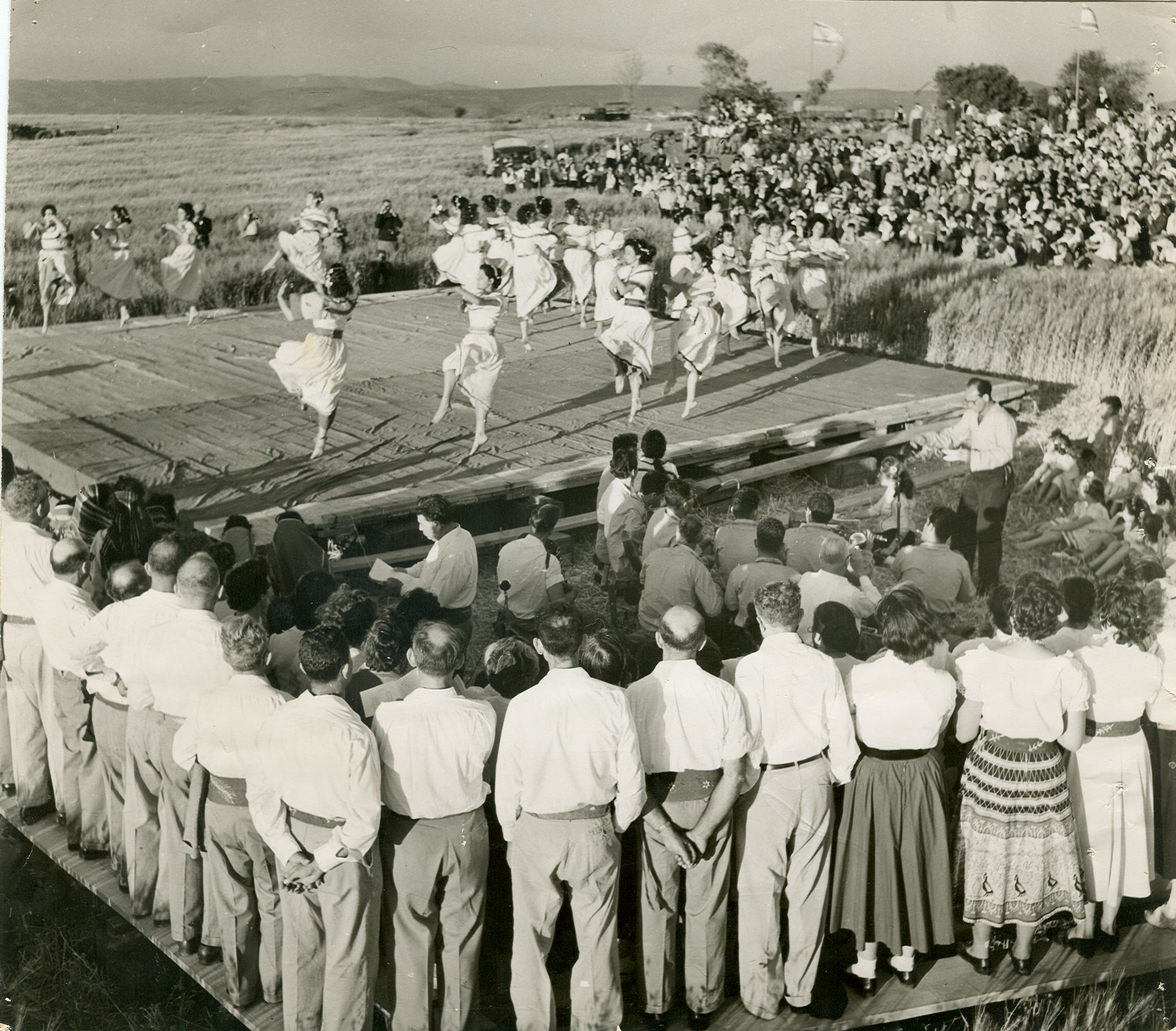
Omer festival dance, Ramat Yohanan, 1940s

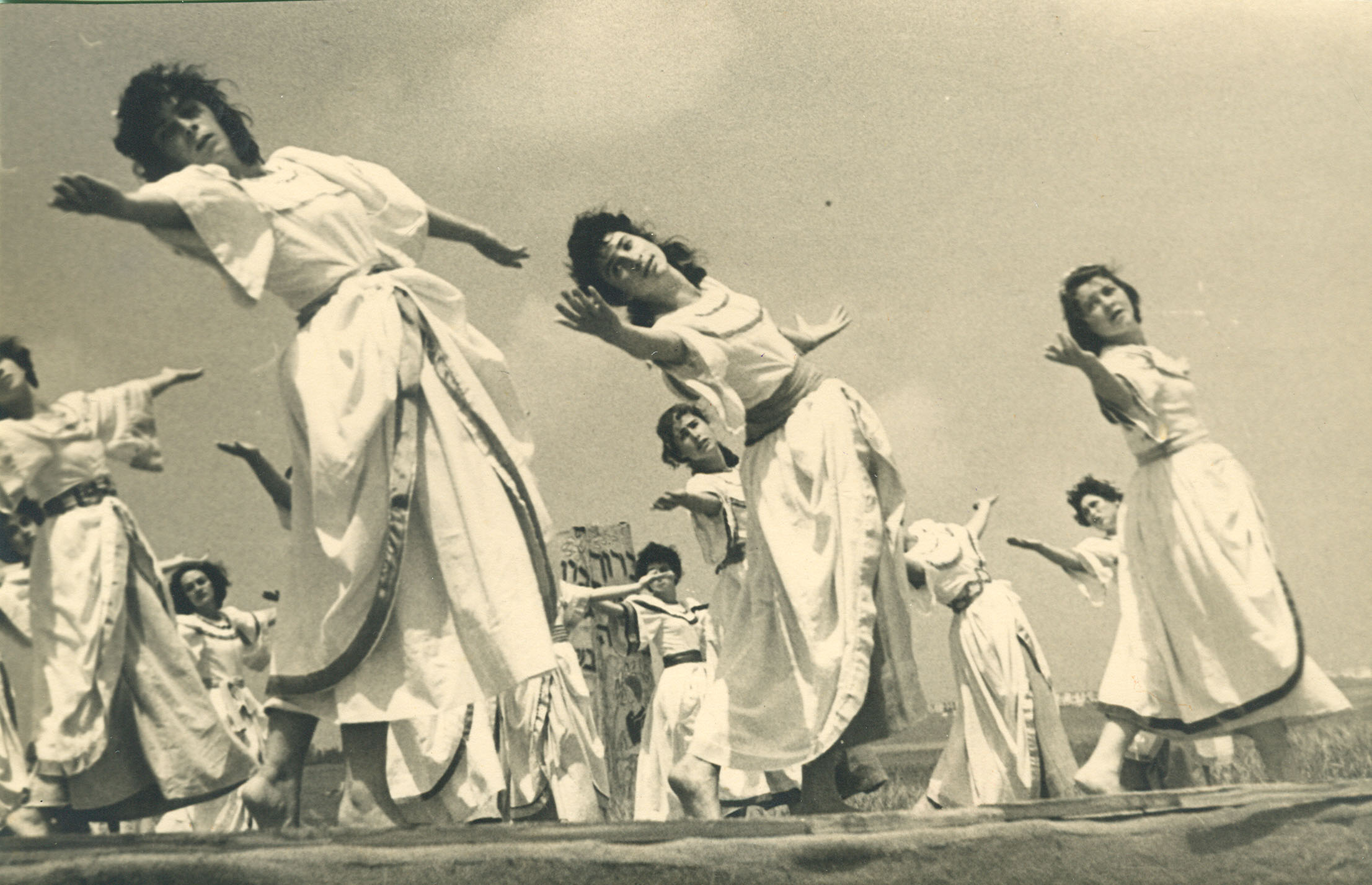
Omer festival dance, closeup, Ramat Yohanan, 1940s

Celebrated on Passover eve, the Omer harvest festival, revived by Bergstein and Shelem at Ramat Yohanan, commemorated the ancient ritual cutting of the wheat. Bergstein built a stage in the field and covered the planks with wheat to create the illusion of dancing on the tops of wheat. This festival marked an important moment in the connection between the people and the land. Building upon the traditions of ancient ceremonies, Bergstein and Shelem added dances and songs to the old material, expanding the festivities to reflect contemporary values. Gurit Kadman, a festival folk dance organizer, once said Bergstein's Omer Festival was "the creation of the most original holiday in Israel, and the holiday dances are perhaps the most Israeli ones ever created." When Israel became independent, Bergstein added the dance "Hen Yerunan" (Also It Will Be Sung) to the festivities. Bergstein's choreography to "Masekhet ha-Omer" (Omer Pageant) has been performed outside of the context of the rural festival.

=== The Harvest Festival/The Water Festival ===
The songs and dances in this festival expressed the joy of the harvest and Simchat Beit HaShoeivah. Bergstein's choreography included a dance with pitchers. In later years, the festival was renamed the Water Festival and celebrated around the swimming pool at Ramat Yohanan.

=== The Festival of First Fruits (Shavuot) ===
In the 1940s, Bergstein and Shelem created a ceremony to celebrate Shavuot. The festival depicted the pilgrimage of the Jews who brought the Bikkurim to the steps of the Temple.

=== Tu BiShvat ===
Bergstein choreographed dances for Tu BiShvat to celebrate the arrival of spring. Bergstein used various popular songs of the time for this festival.

== Dissemination of Bergstein's dances ==
Working in Tel Aviv, Bergstine solidified her belief in imbuing her work with a holiness of place, rather than creating for the stage.

Bergstein founded the Ramat Yohanan Dance Troupe and after the group dissolved and was replaced by the Beni ha-Ilhud Troupe, Bergstein continued to impart her ideas to the next generation through the second troupe at Ramat Yohanan.

Bergstein's dances have inspired subsequent Israeli folk-dance choreographers. She is part of a lineage of dancers and choreographers, including Gurit Kadman, Rivka Sturman, Sara Levi-Tanai, Yardena Cohen, Tirza Hodes, Shalom Hermon, Yoav Ashriel, Yonatan Karmon, and Moshiko (Moshe Itzhak-Halevy). Although Bergstein considered her dances to be inseparable parts of her pageants, they have become lasting features of Israeli folk dance and are still taught and performed around the world today.

== Personal life ==
Bergstein had three serious romantic relationships before her daughter Rahel was born in 1940, and Bergstein remained a single mother.

== See also ==
- Jewish dance
- Folk dance
- Dance in Israel
- Culture in Israel

== Other notable Israeli folk dance choreographers ==
- Gurit Kadman: https://jwa.org/encyclopedia/article/kadman-gurit
- Rivka Sturman: https://jwa.org/encyclopedia/article/sturman-rivka
- Sara Levi-Tanai: https://jwa.org/encyclopedia/article/levi-tanai-sara
- Yardena Cohen: https://jwa.org/encyclopedia/article/cohen-yardena
- Shalom Hermon: https://www.socalfolkdance.org/master_teachers/hermon_s.htm
- Yoav Ashriel: http://israelidances.com/choreographer.asp?name=yoavashriel
- Yonatan Karmon: https://www.socalfolkdance.org/master_teachers/karmon_j.htm
- Moshiko (Moshe Itzhak-Halevy): https://www.socalfolkdance.org/master_teachers/halevy_m.htm
