= Israeli folk dance =

Form of dance usually performed to music from Israel

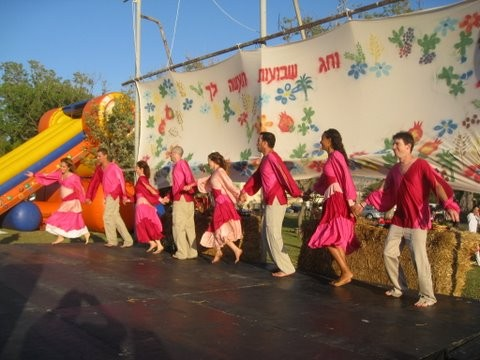
Folk dancing on Shavuot

Israeli folk dance (Hebrew: ריקודי עם, romanized: rikude ʿam, lit. 'folk dances') is a form of dance usually performed to songs in Hebrew, or to other songs which have been popular in Israel, with dances choreographed for specific songs. Israeli dances include circle, partner and line dances. As almost all dances are intentionally choreographed. The choreographers are known and attributed, the reference to these dances as "folk dances" is sometimes controversial among the general folk dance community. The recent trend of dances becoming more complex and "professional" has led some to use the alternative term "Recreational Israeli Dancing."

== History ==
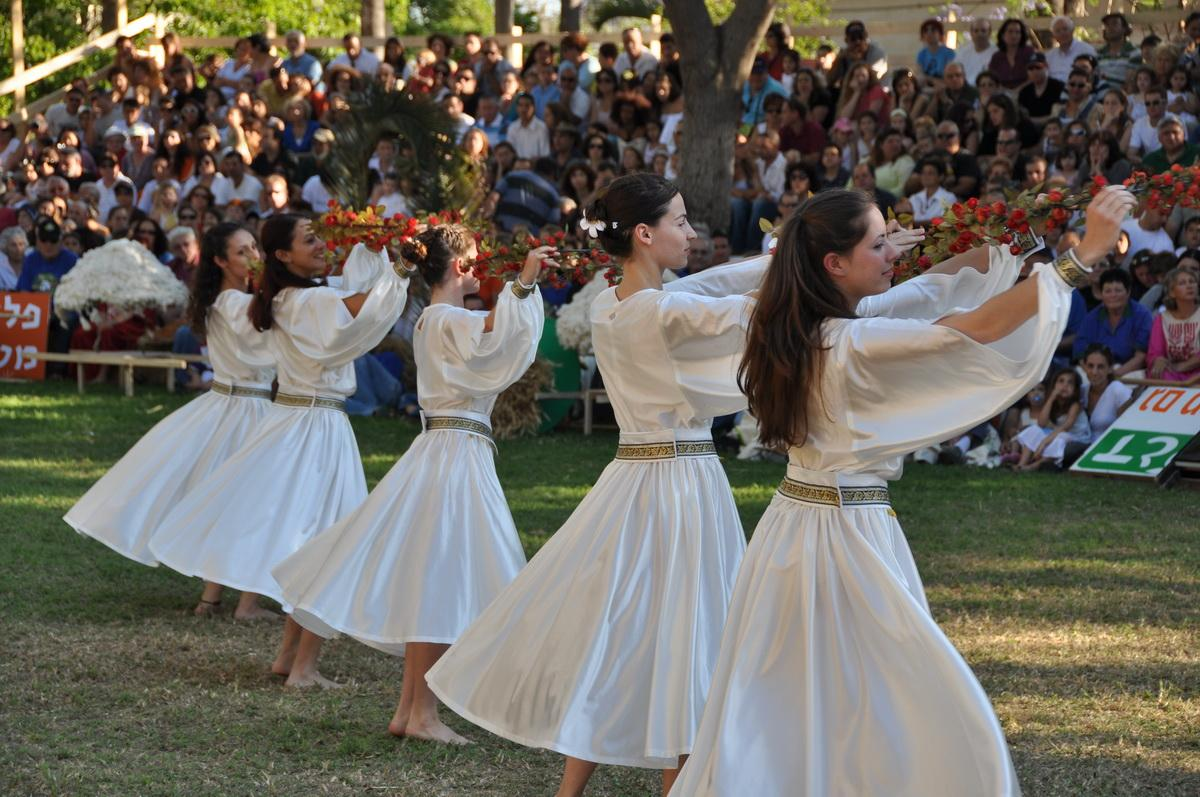
Israeli folk dancing

The Jews have a long dance history within and outside the land of Israel. The Bible and Talmud refer to many events related to dance, and contain over 30 different dance terms.

During the dispersion, the dancing associated with the normal activities of a nation in its own country ceased. The need for community dances first arose among the halutzim (pioneers) of the First Aliyah in 1882, continuing with the Second Aliyah (1904–1914) and the Third Aliyah (1919–1923). During the Second and Third Aliyah periods, between 1904 and 1923, the halutzim danced only dances that they had brought with them from the Diaspora — the horah, polka, Krakowiak, Czerkassiya and rondo, with the horah becoming the national dance. Israeli folk dances were created as to help create a new Israeli culture in the land of Israel, combining elements from other dance cultures with the music and themes of modern Israel. Most dances can be danced by young and old people, celebrating the pioneering spirit. Others were created for professional or semi-professional performing dance groups. Israeli folk dancing is a popular recreational activity in Israel and performed publicly in many towns and cities, particularly on beachfronts and promenades (known as tayelets). It has also spread over time to other countries around the world.

Rivka Sturman, a choreographer who immigrated to Mandatory Palestine, observed that children were being taught German songs in kindergarten and decided it was important for them to have songs and dances that reflected the culture of their own country. She joined a newly formed organization sponsored by the Histadrut that devoted itself to the creation of folk dances. Sturman, who had a background in modern dance, became one of the most prolific folk dance choreographers in the country. From 1942 to 1983, she created, taught, and performed more than 90 dances, many of which are considered Israeli classics.

In 1944, Gurit Kadman organized a First Fruits dance pageant to celebrate the Jewish holiday of Shavuot at kibbutz Dalia. That same year, she organized the first folk dance festival at the kibbutz, which became a regular event. First held in 1988, the Karmiel Dance Festival is the largest celebration of dance in Israel, featuring three or four days and nights of dancing. The festival features 5,000 or more dancers and a quarter of a million spectators in the capital of Galilee. Begun as an Israeli folk dance event, the festivities now include performances, workshops, and open dance sessions for a variety of dance forms and nationalities.

Like many types of European folk dance and country-western line dancing in the U.S., each Israeli folk dance has a fixed choreography (sequence of steps) and is danced to a specific piece of music. The yotzer, or choreographer, selects a piece of music, usually from one of the genres of Israeli music, and arranges a set of steps to fit with that music. The formation of the dance might be a circle, couples, trios, or short lines, as well as a group/line formation as in country-western line dancing.

The movements themselves are varied, in many cases drawing on older Jewish and non-Jewish folk dance traditions. Major folk influences include the Hora (a dance form common to many Eastern and Southeastern European cultures), the Tza’ad Temani, Atari, Da’asa, the dance tradition of the Chasidim (adherents of the Eastern European Jewish religious movement), and other Eastern European folk dance traditions. There are many dabke-type Israeli folk dances; the dabke is originally an Arabic folk dance form of the Middle East. Some dances show primarily a single influence. For example, the dances Hora Chadera (1972) and Eretz, Eretz (1974) hearken back to the Hasidic dance tradition. Some dances combine elements from multiple folk dance traditions, or from folk and non-folk sources. The dance Ma Navu (1956) combines folk dance influences (e.g., the Yemenite step) with movements from ballet. Some Israeli dances—this is more common in the newer dances—have few if any folk elements. Prime examples are Yo Ya and Zodiak, which are done in disco format (i.e., with all dancers facing in the same direction) and have movements almost entirely from jazz dance; purists might consider such dances stylistically outside the limits of folk dance.

In spite of the many changes in the values, dreams, and ways of life of the Israelis, many dances of the 1940s and 1950s remain popular. However, some of these dances are no longer danced. It is hard to specify which dances have fallen out of favour, but the Hora remains common. Many more modern dances incorporate folk-inspired dance moves into their dances. Today, there are groups in Israel whose jobs are to preserve the Israeli folk dance as a manifestation of pan-Jewish cultural heritage. About 100,00 people dance on a regular basis at least once a week and an additional 100,000 dance several times a year.

== Tza'ad Temani ==
The Tza'ad Temani is a dance move consisting of a three-step sequence executed in place with a short pause on the final step ("quick, quick, slow"). The step can be done to the right, left, forward and back.

== Horah ==
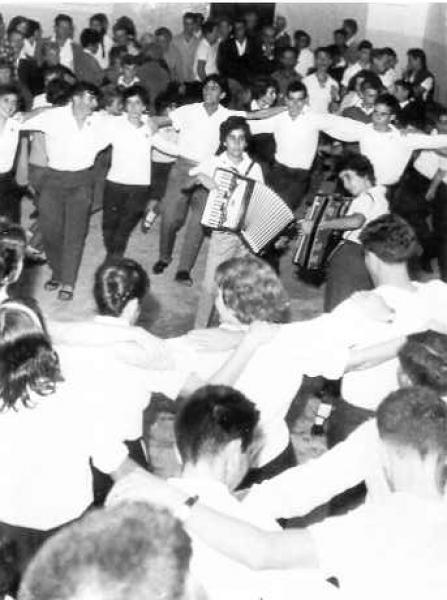
Dancing the hora on a kibbutz

The Horah is a circle dance common in Eastern and Southeastern Europe (known variously as the hora, khoro, horo, or oro) that predates the establishment of the State of Israel. It was introduced to the Mandate of Palestine by Baruch Agadati in 1924. It has become an icon of Jewish and Israeli folk dance. It can be performed to many of the traditional klezmer and Israeli folk songs — archetypally to the music of Hava Nagila. This is the most common dance done at Jewish life cycle joyous events such as weddings and bar and bat mitzvahs.

In its pioneer version, the horah was done at a whirling, breakneck pace. Each dancer’s arms were around the shoulders of those flanking him, with the circle spinning so fast that dancers were sometimes lifted off the ground. The dancing often continued for hours.

== Notable Israeli choreographers ==
- Gurit Kadman

== See also ==
- Culture of Israel
- Middle Eastern dance
- Eshkol-Wachman Movement Notation
- Jewish dance
- Folk dance
- International folk dance
- Klezmer
- Music of Israel
- Mayim Mayim
