= Svadbarsko =

Macedonian dance

Svadbarsko (Свадбарско) or Wedding dance in English is a Macedonian oro from the region of Veles.

It is a man dance with steady and peaceful movements on whole feet. The dancers are holding shoulders and begin their dance in a position of a half circle. The dance rhythm is 2/4.

== See also ==
- Music of North Macedonia
