= Noa Eshkol =

Israeli dancer and artist (1924–2007)

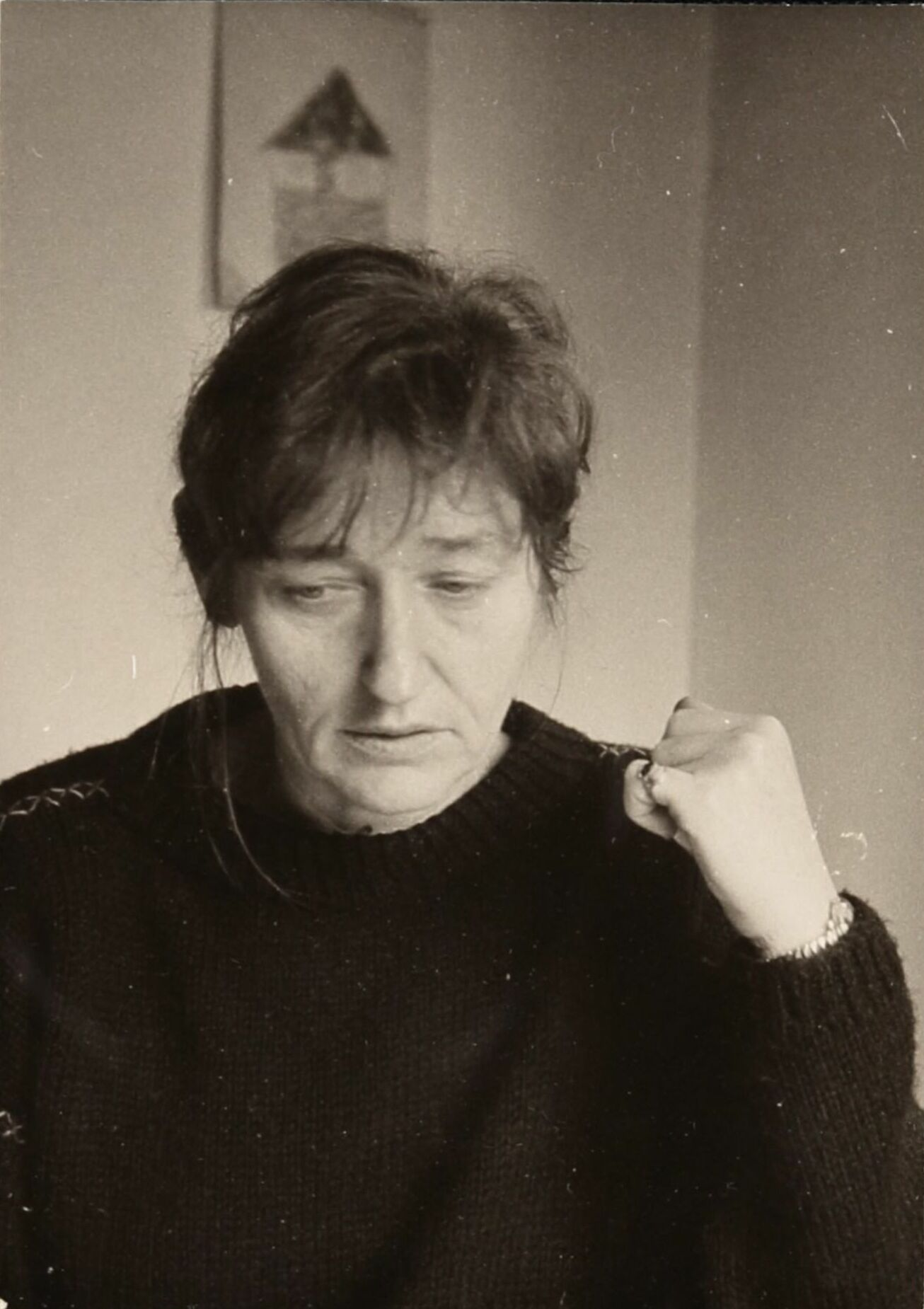
Noa Eshkol

Noa Eshkol (Hebrew: נועה אשכול; 28 February 1924 – 14 October 2007) was an Israeli dance composer and textile artist. Eshkol is best known for her co-invention, alongside architect Avraham Wachman, of the Eshkol-Wachman Movement Notation (EWMN) System. She and Wachman worked together for over two decades to refine the system and develop its various applications.

In addition to her dance work, Eshkol was known for her "wall carpets" which she began creating in the early 1970s. She also found the Noa Eshkol Chamber Group and was granted a professorship in the Tel Aviv University in 1972.

== Early life and education ==
She was born on 28 February 1924 in Deganya Bet to Jewish immigrants from Russian Empire Rivka Maharshek and Levi Eshkol, who later became the 3rd Prime Minister of Israel. Her parents divorced soon after her birth, and she moved with her mother to Tel Aviv.

Noa attended the School for Workers' Children in Tel Aviv with classmates such as Yaakov Rechter and Haim Ben Dor. As a child, Eshkol studied piano with Frank Pelleg.

In 1940, Eshkol and her mother relocated to the town of Holon.

== Career ==
=== Initial Training ===
At the age of 18, Eshkol joined the British Army and served as a driver during World War II. From 1943 to 1945, she attended the Tehila Rössler's School in Tel Aviv, where she studied body culture During her time at school, Eshkol was introduced to Labanotation, a movement notation system developed by Rudolf von Laban. Upon Rössler's motivation, she traveled to Manchester, and received training from Laban himself at the Art of Movement Studio. Eshkol also had the opportunity to study at the Sigurd Leeder School of Modern Dance in London while she was in the UK.

=== Return to Israel ===
After returning to Israel towards the end of the 1948 Palestine War, Eshkol began teaching dance at the Kibbutzim College and the Cameri Theater's drama studio in Tel Aviv.

In 1953, she performed a 50-minute piece at an event commemorating the Warsaw Ghetto Uprising, at an open amphitheater near the Ghetto Fighters' House, Eshkol's piece, performed by her Movement Quartet and dozens of high school students, featured minimalist symbolic choreography accompanied by original music composed by Herbert Brün.

=== Eshkol-Wachman movement notation ===
In 1954, Eshkol collaborated with architect Avraham Wachman to develop and utilize the Eshkol-Wachman Movement Notation system (EWMN). This notation system allows for the recording of limb movements, enabling choreographies and movements to be documented in a manner similar to musical scores.

=== Chamber Dance Group ===
Eshkol established a chamber dance group in which she not only composed dance compositions using her notation system but also danced in the group's early years alongside Naomi Polani and Mirele Sharon.

=== Movement Notation Society ===
In 1968, Noa Eshkol founded the Movement Notation Society in Israel, which was dedicated to promoting and developing her innovative movement notation system, in 1972 she went on to establish and lead the Research Center of Movement Notation at Tel Aviv University's Faculty of Visual and Performing Arts.

== Influence & style ==
Despite her influential role in dance, Eshkol's name is not commonly mentioned among contemporary dance practitioners. Her choreography required her dancers to adjust to minimalism and to understand her notation system. Outside of the studio, Eshkol was interested in literature and studied geometric structures, numerical series, and the connection between form and system. Her works were influenced by cultural and scientific advances of the time, such as the invention of computers, electronic music, and robotics, as well as the focus on NASA.

Eshkol did not approve of theatrical performances and shows. Instead, she preferred to present several-minute scores that were performed in silence, accompanied by a ticking metronome and neutral lighting.

Eshkol believed that movement alone could connect with the audience without the need for music, props, or costumes.

== Textile art ==
Eshkol took a break from dancing and began creating wall carpets in 1973 during the Yom Kippur War. She used only used materials, such as cast-off clothes and rags that were collected and sewn together with her dancers. The carpets featured abstract and still-life compositions, such as The House of Bernarda Alba (Virgin) (1978), which included a square of green fabric surrounded by light-colored arrangements.

== Death ==
Eshkol Passed away on October 14, 2007, at the age of 83 at her home in Holon.

== Legacy ==
Eshkol's 1953 Holocaust Memorial dance performance was the inspiration and heavily used in Yael Bartana's 2019 video The undertaker.

American artist Sharon Lockhart created a series of works in 2011 based on the dances created by Eshkol. Lockhart discovered Eshkol's work during a research trip sponsored by the Jewish Federation of Greater Los Angeles's Tel Aviv-Los Angeles Partnership. She collaborated with dancers from the Noa Eshkol Chamber Dance Group, some of whom had worked with Eshkol herself to document Eshkol's compositions on film for her works Five Dances and Nine Wall Carpets by Noa Eshkol and Four Exercises in Eshkol-Wachman Movement Notation. Additionally, Lockhart photographed the spheres devised by Eshkol and Wachman to record movement as part of their system.

Despite her contributions to the field, Eshkol never identified herself as a choreographer and declined to accept awards such as the Israel Prize and the Histadrut Prize for Lifetime Achievement.

== See also ==
- Sharon Lockhart
- Eshkol-Wachman movement notation
- Dance in Israel
