= Adana (dance) =

Macedonian folk dance

- Genre: Folk dance
- Time signature: 2/4
- Origin: Veles, North Macedonia

Adana (Macedonian: Адана) is a traditional Macedonian Oro, folk dance, from the town of Veles.

It is a man dance with medium fast movements. The dance in the beginning is danced with balancing and later when it in becomes faster is danced with jumping, kneeling down and turning around. The dancers in the beginning are holding shoulders and later when the dance gets faster they hold hands. They begin their dance in a position of a half circle. The dance rhythm is 2/4.

== See also ==
- Music of North Macedonia
