= Hag ha-Gez =

Biblical festival involving sheep shearing

Hag ha-Gez or Re´shit ha-Gez was the biblical festival or celebration of the shearing of the sheep.

Hag ha-Gez took place once a year, at the beginning of the spring, once the winter cold was gone. Although lacking the liturgical importance of the pilgrim festivals related to the harvest of cereals at the beginning of the agricultural season or to the harvest of grapes and the ingathering of fruits at the end of the period, the shearing of the sheep was, nonetheless, a memorable convivium that brought together people of different localities to enjoy banquets "fit for royalty". The "first fruits of the shearing of the flock" were entitlements of the priests, just as it were the first fruits of grain, wine and oil and portions of the animals sacrificed.

No specific celebration of the shearing of the sheep takes place in present-day Israel (The attempts at kibbutzim to introduce any new kind of agricultural festival of secular nature haven't succeeded). Leah Bergstein created a choreography for a sheep-shearing festival but it was held only twice. The possibility exists, however, that Lag BaOmer, a joyful celebration of obscure origin and forgotten meaning, observed since Geonic times in mid-spring and in which highly religious Jews give their three-year-old boys their first haircut, could somehow echo the ancient event.

== Sources ==
- Gen. 31:19, 38:12; Deut. 18:4; I Sam. 25:2; 2 Sam. 13:23-27; 2 Kings 3:4.
- Freedman, D.N. (ed.), Eerdmans Dictionary of the Bible, Grand Rapids, Mi., W.B. Eerdmans Publishing Co., 2004.
- The Harpercollins Bible Dictionary, N.Y., Harpercollins Publishers, 2011.
- The New Encyclopedia of Judaism, N.Y., New York University Press, 2002.
- Encyclopaedia Judaica, Jerusalem, Keter Publishing House, 1972.
