= Sharon Lockhart =

American artist (born 1964)

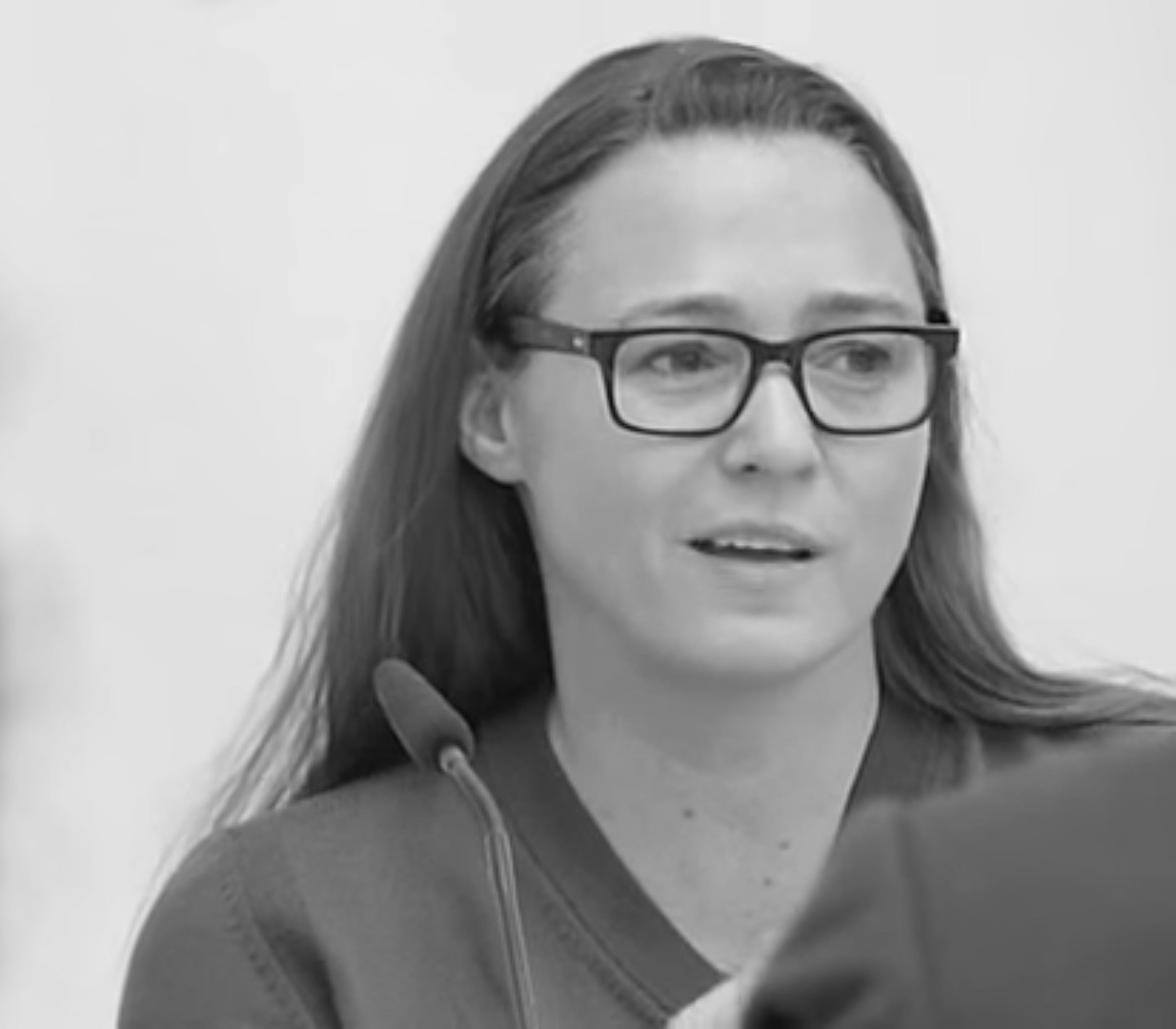
- Sharon Lockhart, 2012
- Born: 1964 (age 61–62); Norwood, Massachusetts
- Education: San Francisco Art Institute; Art Center College of Design
- Occupation: Artist
- Known for: Film, photography
- Website: lockhartstudio.com

Sharon Lockhart (born 1964) is an American artist whose work considers social subjects primarily through motion film and still photography, often engaging with communities to create work as part of long-term projects. She received her BFA from the San Francisco Art Institute in 1991 and her MFA from Art Center College of Design in 1993. She has been a Radcliffe fellow, a Guggenheim fellow, and a Rockefeller fellow. Her films and photographic work have been widely exhibited at international film festivals and in museums, cultural institutions, and galleries around the world. She was an associate professor at the University of Southern California's Roski School of Fine Arts, resigning from the school in August 2015 in response to the continued administrative turmoil at Roski to take a position at the California Institute of the Arts. Lockhart lives and works in Los Angeles, California.

== Work ==
=== Goshogaoka Girls Basketball Team (1998) ===
For Goshogaoka Girls Basketball Team, a series of 12 photographs, Lockhart turned to images of a girls' basketball team at a school in the Tokyo suburb of Goshogaoka, mimicking the style of the professional athlete's publicity still. The images were made in conjunction with the artist's first film, Goshogaoka, of the team executing elaborate (actually choreographed) practice drills. Whereas the camera in Goshogaoka remains fixed in one place the entire film, the viewpoint is constantly changing in Goshogaoka Girls Basketball Team, creating visual movement around the gym as well as around the players.

=== Teatro Amazonas (1999) ===
In Teatro Amazonas (1999), an audience seated in the neoclassical opera house of the same name in Manaus, Brazil, looks back at the camera and the viewer throughout the duration of the film. Photographed from a stationary camera positioned on the stage at the front of the theater, one unedited take shows the audience listening to a live performance by the Choral do Amazonas choir. The musical score, an original choral composition written by Californian composer Becky Allen, begins with a solid chordal mass which gradually becomes silent over twenty-four minutes. As the sound of the choir diminishes, the audience sound rises.

=== NŌ (2003) ===
In 2003, Lockhart returned to Japan to create a series of works with local farmers. Her film NŌ, created in conjunction with a movement coordinator, depicts two farmers as they cover a field in hay. Throughout the duration of the film, they move incrementally closer to the fixed-frame camera, eventually returning to the back of the now hay-covered farmland. This project also includes the No-No Ikebana series of works. In these, the artist photographed the life cycles of plants arranged according to the Japanese art of ikebana over 31 days.

=== Duane Hanson works ===
In a monumental four-part photographic work of 2003, Lockhart pays homage to Duane Hanson’s monumental sculpture Lunch Break (1989). The sculpture depicts three construction workers taking their lunch among the scaffolding and ladders from which they have descended, while the photographs depict two museum preparators installing the work. A large-scale diptych, Maja and Elodie, depicts a woman interacting with Hanson's more intimate sculpture, Child with Puzzle (1978). The sculpture represents a girl sitting on a rug making a jigsaw puzzle, which Lockhart photographs with the young woman sitting across from the sculpture.

=== Pine Flat (2006) ===
Set in the backdrop of a rural village in California's Sierra Nevada Mountains, the feature-length 16mm film Pine Flat (2006) and large-scale portraits focus on the community's youth and the experience of American childhood. For the series of nineteen portrait photographs of Pine Flat's youth, Lockhart set up a traditional studio in a nearby barn, where the children could sit in the historic method. In preparation for each photograph, Lockhart took Polaroids so that each of her subjects could have some say about the way he or she would be portrayed. Lockhart asked the Los Angeles architecture firm Escher GuneWardena to design her series of Pine Flat exhibitions.

=== Lunch Break (2008) ===
In the installation Lunch Break (2008), designed in collaboration with architects Escher Gunewardena, a single tracking shot slowly slides down a locker-filled corridor where ironworkers at a Maine shipyard eat their lunch (teasing the 11-minute event into 83 minutes of film). The soundtrack, designed in collaboration with composer Becky Allen and filmmaker James Benning, weaves the diegetic tones created by worker's voices with industrial sounds and music. In a series of accompanying photographs, Lockhart depicts the workers interacting with each other, including a series of independent business run by the ironworkers catering to their coworkers. Finally eighteen more formalized still-lives of the workers’ lunch boxes serve as portraits of their owners—in each case, the worker is both framed by and frames the work place.

=== Podwórka (2009) ===
In 2009, Lockhart created Podwórka. Shot in the courtyards of Łódź, Poland, this film depicts children at play. In a series of filmic tableaux, Lockhart uses a fixed-frame camera to capture the improvisational, impromptu games that these children devise, shaping a visual testament to youthful resourcefulness.

=== Sharon Lockhart/Noa Eshkol (2011) ===
A series of Lockhart's works from 2011 are based on the dances created by Israeli artist, choreographer and dance theorist Noa Eshkol (1924-2007). Lockhart discovered Eshkol's work as both a textile artist, dance composer, and movement notation pioneer on a research trip sponsored by the Jewish Federation of Greater Los Angeles’s Tel Aviv-Los Angeles Partnership. For her films Five Dances and Nine Wall Carpets by Noa Eshkol and Four Exercises in Eshkol-Wachman Movement Notation (both 2011), Lockhart collaborated with dancers from the Noa Eshkol Chamber Dance Group – a group of dancers, some of which worked with Eshkol herself – to document Eshkol's compositions on film. This project also consists of a series of works for which Lockhart photographed the spheres devised by Noa Eshkol and Israeli architect and professor Avraham Wachman to document and record movement as part of their system of Eshkol-Wachman movement notation. The work was a joint commission by the Israel Museum in Jerusalem and the Los Angeles County Museum of Art.

=== Rudzienko and further work in Poland (2013-ongoing) ===
Returning to Poland, Lockhart began to collaborate with Milena – a young woman who she befriended in Łódź during the production of Podwórka and had since stayed in contact with. This collaboration resulted in the production of a series of photographs as well as the film Antoine/Milena (2015) in which Milena reenacts the iconic final scene from François Truffaut's The 400 Blows. Through this collaboration, Lockhart was introduced to the residents of the Youth Center for Sociotherapy in Rudzienko, Poland – the state-run institution for girls where Milena lived. Over the course of three summers, Lockhart, together with movement therapists, philosophers, theater directors, and pedagogues, would conduct a series of generative workshops with the girls of the Center. From this collaboration Lockhart created her film Rudzienko (2016), which had its cinematic premiere at the 67th Berlin International Film Festival in 2017.

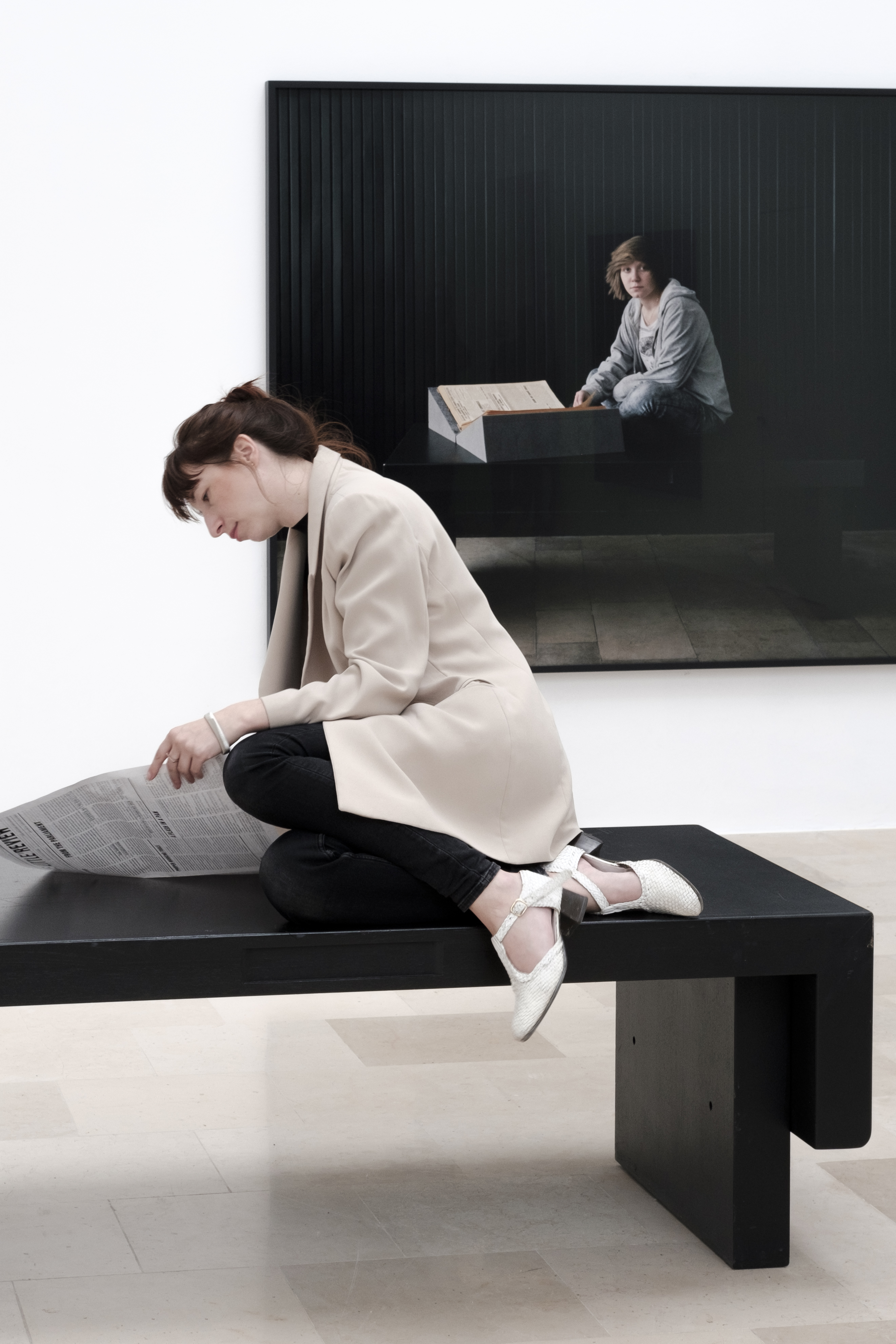
Sharon Lockhart's Little Review exhibition at the 57th Venice Biennale

In 2016, Lockhart was selected to represent Poland at the 57th International Art Exhibition at the Venice Biennale, set to take place the following year. For her project in the Polish Pavilion, Lockhart created a multi-part presentation consisting of a filmic installation and a series of photographs created with the residents of Rudzienko. The presentation was complemented by a new series of workshops at the Centre as well as the first ever English-language translations of Mały Przegląd (Little Review) – a newspaper insert published weekly in Poland from 1926 to 1939 and distributed with the Jewish newspaper Nasz Przegląd (Our Review). An initiative of educator, pedagogue, author, pediatrician, and children's rights activist Janusz Korczak, Mały Przegląd exclusively featured articles written and edited by children.

== Exhibitions ==
Lockhart had solo exhibitions at international venues including Wiener Secession, Austria; Walker Art Center, Minneapolis; Fogg Museum at Harvard University, Cambridge; Sala Rekalde, Bilbao, Spain; Museum Boijmans Van Beuningen, Rotterdam; Kunsthalle Zürich; Museum of Contemporary Art, Chicago; Kunstmuseum Wolfsburg, Germany, and MAK-Austrian Museum of Applied Arts, Vienna. Her films have been included in the New York Film Festival, Vienna International Film Festival, Berlin Film Festival, and the Sundance Film Festival, where Lunch Break and Exit were selected in 2009. The Lunch Break exhibition debuted at the Wiener Secession in November, 2008 and was later exhibited at Mildred Lane Kemper Art Museum, Saint Louis, and the Colby College Museum of Art, Maine. Lockhart and her work in Poland were the subject of a trilogy of successive exhibitions at the Centre for Contemporary Art, Ujazdowski Castle, Warsaw (2013), Bonniers Konsthall, Stockholm (2014), and Kunstmuseum Luzern, Lucerne (2015).

The artist is represented by neugerriemschneider, Berlin and Gladstone Gallery, New York/Brussels.

== Collections ==
Lockhart's work is represented in numerous important collections, including the Albright-Knox Art Gallery, Buffalo; Art Institute of Chicago, Chicago; Carnegie Museum of Art, Pittsburgh; Eli Broad Family Foundation, Los Angeles; Solomon R. Guggenheim Museum, New York; Hammer Museum, Los Angeles; Henry Art Gallery, Seattle; Israel Museum, Jerusalem; Los Angeles County Museum of Art, Los Angeles; Metropolitan Museum of Art, New York; Milwaukee Art Museum, Milwaukee; Museum Boijmans Van Beuningen, Rotterdam; Museum of Contemporary Art, Chicago; Museum of Contemporary Art, Los Angeles; Museum of Contemporary Art, San Diego; Museum of Fine Arts, Boston; Saint Louis Art Museum, Saint Louis; Tate Modern, London; Walker Art Center, Minneapolis; Whitney Museum of American Art, New York; Ruth and Elmer Wellin Museum of Art, Clinton; among others.

== Recognition ==
Lockhart received artist-in-residence fellowships from the DAAD, Berlin (1999), the Asian Cultural Council Grant, Ibaragi, Japan (1996) and Künstlerhaus Bethanien, Berlin (1995). In 2013, she was shortlisted for the £40,000 2015 biennial Artes Mundi prize.
