= Tresenica =

Type of dance

Mariovska tresenica
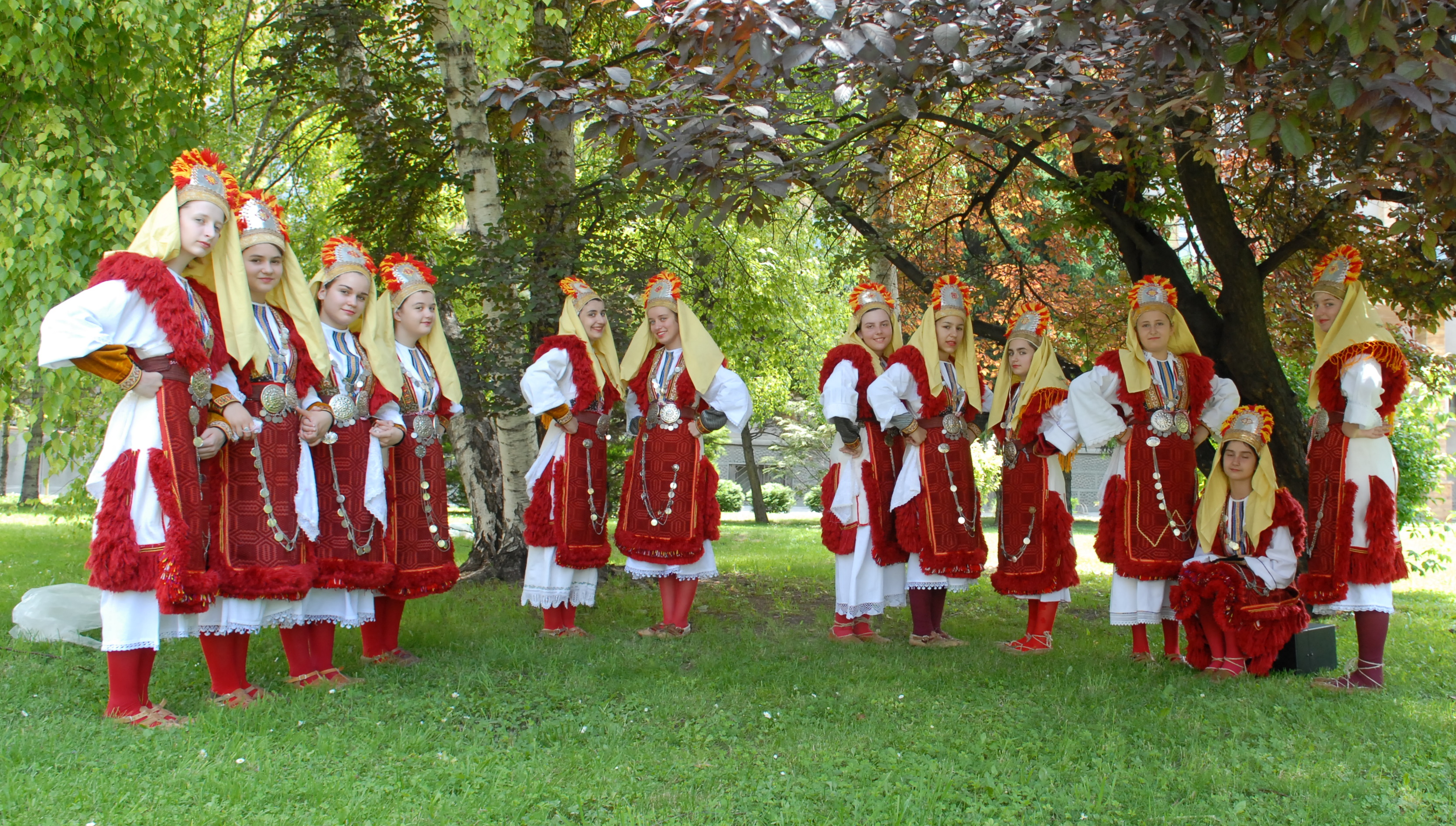
- Young Macedonian girls performing the "Mariovska Tresenica"
- Genre: Folk dance
- Time signature: 2/4
- Origin: Mariovo, North Macedonia

Tresenica (Macedonian: Tресеница) or Shaking dance in English is a Macedonian oro from the region of Mariovo.

It is a typical women's dance with steady and proud movements and careful balance of the body. The dancers hold hands and begin their dance in semicircle. The dance rhythm is 2/4 and there are four versions of the dance.

== See also ==
- Music of North Macedonia
