= Jewish dance =

Type of dance

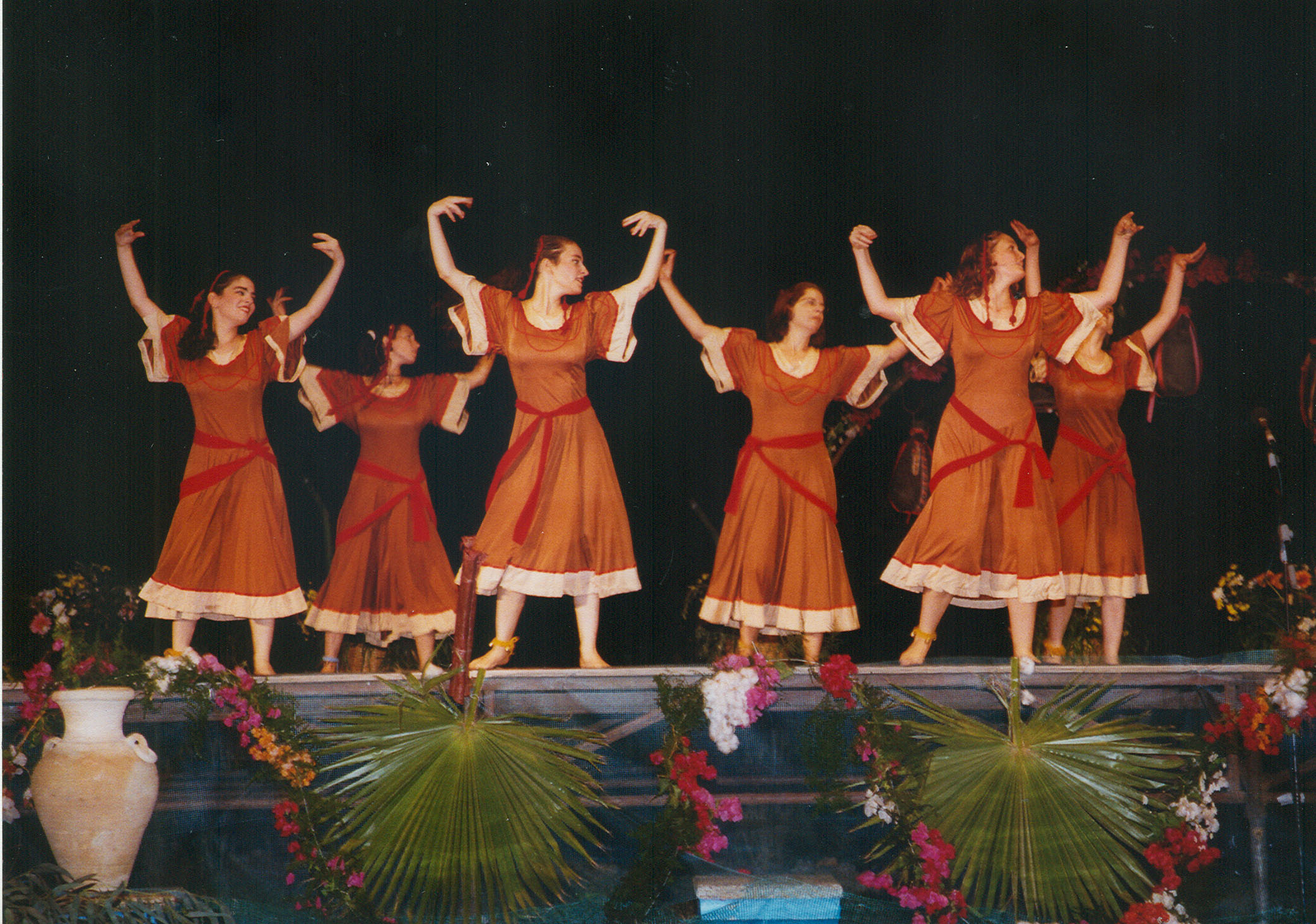
Water Festival, Kibbutz Ramat Yohanan

Jewish dance is dance associated with Jews and Judaism. Dance has long been used by Jews as a medium for the expression of joy and other communal emotions. Dancing is a favorite pastime and plays a role in religious observance.

Dances associated with Ashkenazi and Sephardi traditions, especially Jewish wedding dances, are an integral part of Jewish life around the world. Folk dances associated with Zionism and the formation of the State of Israel became popular in the 1950s.

== Jewish vernacular dance ==
Among Ashkenazi Jews dancing to klezmer music was an integral part of weddings in shtetls. Jewish dance was influenced by local non-Jewish dance traditions, but there were clear differences, mainly in hand and arm motions, with more intricate legwork by the younger men. Jewish religious law frowned on mixed dancing, dictating separate circles for men and women.

=== Hasidic dance ===
In Hasidic Judaism, dance is a tool for expressing joy and is believed to purify the soul, promote spiritual elation and unify the community. It also thought to stimulate joy and therefore to have a therapeutic effect.

=== Horah ===
The Horah is a Jewish circle dance typically danced to the music of Hava Nagila. It is traditionally danced at Jewish weddings and other joyous occasions in the Jewish community. The popularity of Horah in Israel is attributed by some to the Romanian Jewish dancer Baruch Agadati. In 1924, he choreographed a show performed by the workers' theater "Ohel", which toured the pioneer settlements of the Jezreel Valley. "Hora Agadati," as the dance was known, became a success there. The dance was influenced by the Romanian one and some features of Russian dances. Over the time the dance evolved, and in mid-1940s its creator said that now it had become a real folk dance.

=== Tza'ad Temani ===
The Tza’ad Temani is a form of dancing based on hopping in place. The Tza'ad Temani is frequently incorporated in public dancing at Jewish weddings and celebrations. The Inbal Dance Theater specializes in Temani dancing in Israel.

== Jews in concert dance in the world ==
=== Ballet ===
In Russia and France, the Ballets Russes was "primarily a Jewish creation," according to Paul Johnson. In the United States, Jewish choreographers and dancers have been leading figures in the dance world, among them Jerome Robbins, Anna Sokolow, Michael Bennett, Michael Kidd, Ron Field, Arthur Murray, Helen Tamiris and Pearl Lang. Lincoln Kirstein was one of the founders of the School of American Ballet, The American Ballet and the New York City Ballet.

=== Modern dance in Israel ===
One of the pioneers of modern dance in Israel was Gertrud Kraus, who immigrated to Mandatory Palestine in 1935 and formed a modern dance company affiliated with the Tel Aviv Folk Opera. In 1950-1951, she founded the Israel Ballet Theatre, and became its artistic director. Contemporary dance in Israel is influenced by Israeli folk dance and European traditions. Dance companies include the Kibbutz Contemporary Dance Company, Inbal Dance Theater, Bat-Dor Dance Company and Batsheva Dance Company.

=== Modern dance in the United States ===
Jewish dance in America stemmed from the minds of choreographers such as Martha Graham and her mentee, Anna Sokolow. They created works of moving art that served as a form of advocacy and awareness of the growing antisemitism in the United States during the post World War II period. These works, such as The Exile premiered by Anna Sokolow in 1939, sparked both criticism and acts of praise from the public. Some saw this modern movement as a beautiful tribute to those who had been persecuted during World War II while others, including critics from The New York Times, saw it as an unnecessary form of propaganda. This type of modern dance was taught at companies such as the Martha Graham Dance Company and the New Dance Group.

== See also ==
- Culture in Israel
- Jewish music
- Secular Jewish culture
- Secular Jewish music
- Israeli folk dance
- Middle Eastern dance
