= Eshkol-Wachman movement notation =

Notation system for recording movement

Logo of the attendant society

Eshkol-Wachman movement notation is a notation system for recording movement on paper or computer screen. The system was created in Israel by dance theorist Noa Eshkol and Avraham Wachman, a professor of architecture at the Technion. The system is used in many fields, including dance, physical therapy, animal behavior and early diagnosis of autism.

The Movement Notation Society, located in Holon, Israel, is the official organization devoted to Eshkol-Wachman movement notation.

== Overview ==
Eshkol-Wachman movement notation is a system to record movement on paper or computer screen, developed by choreographer Noa Eshkol (daughter of Levi Eshkol) and architect Abraham Wachman. It was originally developed for dance to enable choreographers to write a dance down on paper that dancers could later reconstruct in its entirety, much as composers write a musical score that musicians can later play.

In comparison to most dance notation systems, Eshkol-Wachman movement notation was intended to notate any manner of movement, not only dance. As such, it is not limited to particular dance styles or even to the human form. It has been used to analyze animal behaviour as well as dance (Golani 1976).

Stick figure

Eshkol-Wachman movement notation treats the body as a sort of stick figure. The body is divided at its skeletal joints, and each pair of joints defines a line segment (a "limb"). For example, the foot is a limb bounded by the ankle and the end of the toe.

The relationship of those segments in three-dimensional space is described using a spherical coordinate system. If one end of a line segment is held in a fixed position, that point is the center of a sphere whose radius is the length of the line segment. Positions of the free end of the segment can be defined by two coordinate values on the surface of that sphere, analogous to latitude and longitude on a globe.

Limb positions are written somewhat like fractions, with the vertical number written over the horizontal number. The horizontal component (the lower) is read first. These two numbers are enclosed in brackets or parentheses to indicate whether the position in being described relative to an adjacent limb or to external reference points, such as a stage.

Eshkol-Wachman scores are written on grids, where each horizontal row represents the position and movement of a single limb, and each vertical column represents a unit of time. Movements are shown as transitions between initial and end coordinates.

== History ==
Noa Eshkol (1924–2007) and Abraham Wachman (1931–2010) created the Eshkol-Wachman Movement Notation (EWMN) for recording movement. The original book presenting the system was published by Weidenfeld & Nicolson in 1958. EWMN is a movement notation, not a dance notation. Its user therefore can write down any form of human or animal movement without limiting oneself to any particular style (classical ballet for example). It gives the notator the freedom to use this system wherever movement occurs.

EWMN offers a new and original way of thinking about, observing and analyzing movement. Eshkol was a revolutionary thinker herself and she believed that movement notation could open a lot of new doors in fields where movement is involved. Using EWMN, she composed five dance suites (Publication) all of them to be performed without music. (When performed without music, the audience and the dancers are forced to focus on how movement by itself can evoke emotions within and set the mood of a choreographed dance.) When asked to address her viewpoint, Eshkol used the example that someone does not swell their chest to express strength but instead the action of swelling the chest causes the feeling of strength. (This is somewhat parallel to the James-Lange theory of emotion.) Eshkol stated that by analyzing movement we might begin to understand how one movement evokes a certain emotion while another movement produces an entirely different feeling. The use of movement notation can also lead to the discovery of new laws of composition in particular dance styles, similar to those found in music or other types of art where aesthetic rules are implemented.

== Structure: basic elements ==
The following are the basic concepts of EWMN;

=== The body ===
Law of heavy and light limbs

To establish one general form that will stand conceptually for all bodies, an abstract body, similar to a 'stick figure' image is proposed: a 'man without qualities'. Each limb is reduced to its longitudinal axis – an imaginary straight line of unchanging length. A limb, in EW, is considered to be any part of the body, which lies between two adjacent joints or a joint and a free extremity.

=== Law of 'light' and 'heavy' limbs ===
Law of heavy and light limbs

When a person walks his legs move but the rest of his body (i.e. the torso, the arm, and the head) is being carried along by the movement of the legs. EWMN labels this phenomenon "the law of light and heavy limbs". The structure of the body is dealt with as a branching linkage. The base is conceived as the 'heaviest' segment of the body. When a 'heavy' limb moves it carries all adjacent 'lighter' limbs passively along.

When standing upright the feet, considered as the base of the body, are the heaviest limb. The legs are lighter (than the base), the torso lighter than the legs, etc.

=== Manuscript page ===
Manuscript page

EWMN is written, not drawn. Movements are written on a horizontally ruled notation page (resembling a spreadsheet) which represents the body. Vertical lines divide the page into columns, denoting units of time. The symbols for movements are written in order, from left to right. The standard (default) distribution of the limb groups is shown.

The set-up of the notation page in EW is very flexible. It allows the user to divide the body into as many (or as few) parts as necessary to adequately define the movement to be notated. Movements written in EWMN can be set to music. However music is not required, since EWMN focuses on the recording of movement alone.

=== System of reference (SoR) ===
System of reference

EWMN describes movement using a geometrical model that allows the user to observe and notate movement in an objective way, free of verbal ambiguity and emotional attachment. The notation utilizes a spherical system of coordinates, similar to latitude and longitude on a globe. Since the movement of a single axis of constant length free to move about one fixed end, will all be enclosed by a sphere, the free end will always describe a curved path on the surface of this sphere. Every limb in the body can be regarded as such an axis.

Constructing the SoR: One direction on the horizontal plane of the sphere is selected as the starting position for all measurements. This direction is labeled zero (0). By measuring off intervals of 45 degrees, eight positions are obtained (Fig. 6). Four vertical planes intersect the horizontal circle, they are perpendicular to it.

=== Positions and movement ===
The position of a limb is defined by identifying it with the coordinates of the SoR. Movements of limbs are also defined, oriented and measured in relation to the SoR.

To document transitions between static positions the system takes into consideration the type of movement, amount of movement, spatial orientation and sense (clockwise or anti clockwise), of the movement.

==== Types of movement ====
Three types of movement are defined: Rotatory movement, when the limb rotates around its axis without changing its place in space. An example of such movement is turning a door knob. Plane movement, the shortest distance traveled by a limb between any two positions on the SoR. "Jumping jacks" exercise is an example for Plane movement. Conical movement, can be seen in the waist when doing the hula hoop.

System of reference, example 1

System of reference, example 2

System of reference, example 3

== Applications ==
The flexibility and utility of EWMN allows it to be applied in a wide variety of fields. It has been used to record movements and forms of the hands and fingers in sign language; in the composition of dances, and the recording of folk dances; it has also been used in the fields of medicine, the Feldenkrais Method and sports. The notation has also been used to record the courting behavior of jackals, and other ethological research. It was used in the field of graphic and kinetic visual art, and a computer system has been written to plot any movement that can be recorded in EWMN. The notation can easily lend itself to applications in the fields of robotics, animation or motion picture. The system has even been successfully used to detect the very first movement patterns which are a precursor to the development of autism. This research carried out by Prof. Philip Teitelbaum and Osnat Teitelbaum at the University of Florida was based entirely on the use of EW to study infant movements. It shows that specific movement patterns appearing in the first few months of life can be a reliable predictor of Autism Spectrum Conditions.

== See also ==
- Dance in Israel
- Culture in Israel
- Israeli inventions and discoveries
