= Hora (dance) =

Form of circle dance originating in Eastern Europe, Asia Minor, Greece and the Balkans

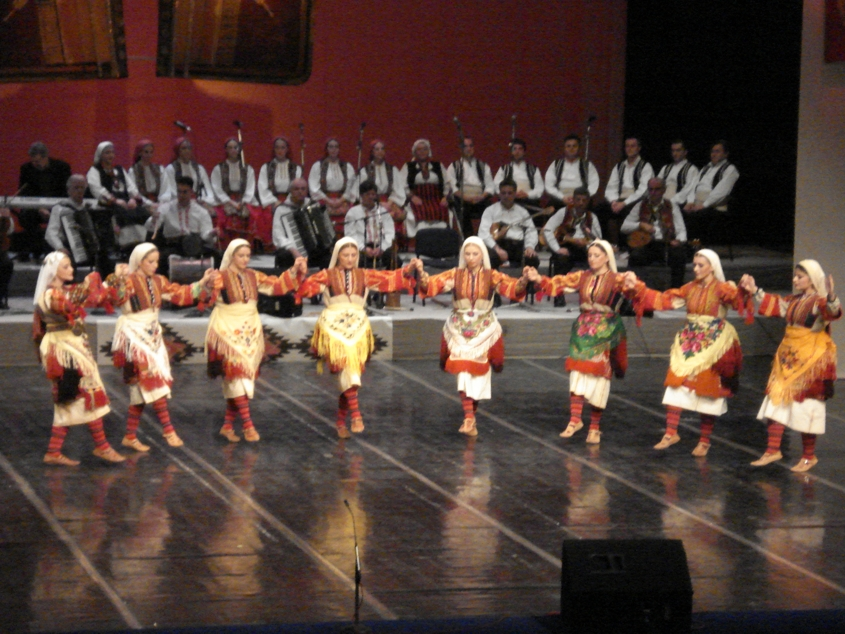
A traditional oro playing in North Macedonia

Hora, also known as horo and oro, is a type of circle dance traditionally performed in Southeast Europe. Circle dances with similar names are found in Bulgaria, Romania, Moldova, North Macedonia, Greece and Turkey, and among ethnic minorities such as the Ashkenazi Jews (Yiddish: האָרע hore), Sephardic Jews (Ladino: הורו horo) and the Roma.

== Etymology ==
The name, spelled differently in various countries, is derived from the Greek χορός (khorós): "dance", which is cognate with the Ancient Greek art form of χορεία (khoreía). The original meaning of the Greek word χορός may have been "circle".

Also, the words hora and oro are found in many Slavic languages and have the meaning of "round (dance)"; the verb oriti means "to speak, sound, sing" and previously meant "to celebrate".

The Greek χορός (khorós) is cognate with Pontic Greek χορόν (khorón), and has also given rise to the names of Bulgarian хоро (horo), Macedonian оро (oro), Romanian horă, Turkish hora and Hebrew הורה (horah). The Khorumi dance of Georgia also might be connected to the Horon dance in the neighboring Turkish regions, as it rose out of the Adjara region, where Kartvelian Laz people co-existed for centuries with Greek Pontians.

== Variants ==
=== Romania and Moldova ===
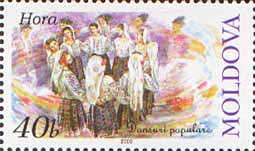

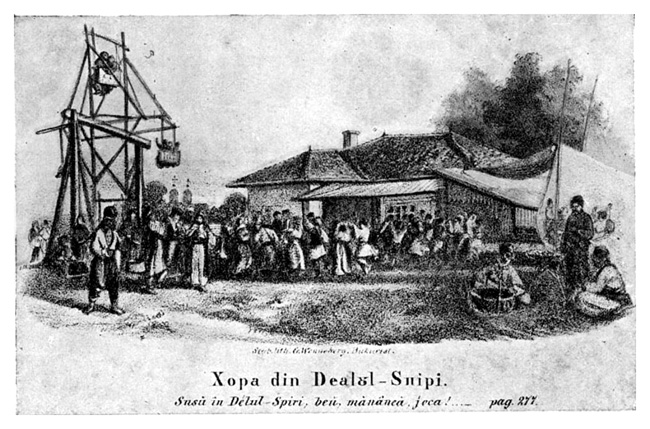
Dancing the hora on Dealul Spirii (Spirii Hill), Bucharest (1857 lithograph)

Horă (plural: hore) is a traditional Romanian and Moldovan folk dance where the dancers hold each other's hands and the circle spins, usually counterclockwise, as each participant follows a sequence of three steps forward and one step back. The dance is usually accompanied by musical instruments such as the cymbalom, accordion, violin, viola, double bass, saxophone, trumpet or the pan pipes.

The hora is popular during wedding celebrations and festivals, and is an essential part of the social entertainment in rural areas. One of the most famous hore is the "Hora Unirii" ("Hora of the Union"), which became a Romanian patriotic song as a result of being the hymn when Wallachia and Moldavia united to form the Principality of Romania in 1859. During the 2006/2007 New Year's Eve celebration, when Romania and Bulgaria joined the European Union, people were dancing Hora Bucuriei ("Hora of Joy") over the boulevards of Bucharest as a tribute to the EU anthem, Ode to Joy (Romanian: Odă bucuriei). Some of the biggest hora circles can be found on early 20th century movies filmed by the Manaki brothers in Pindus, Greece, and performed by local Aromanians.

=== Horo in Bulgaria ===
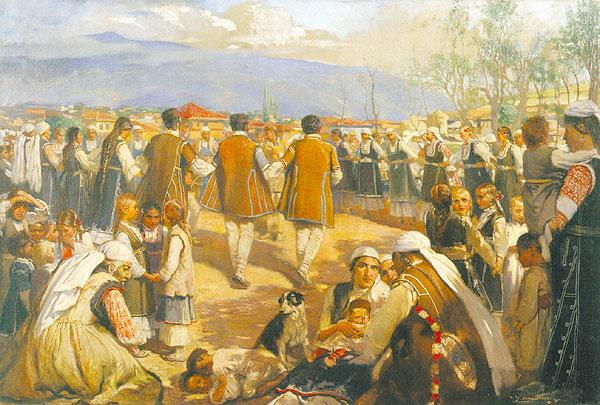
A Shop horo of Bulgaria

The traditional Bulgarian dance horo (Bulgarian: хоро) comes in many shapes. It is not necessary to be in a circle; a curving line of people is also acceptable. The steps used in a horo dance are extremely diverse. The horo may vary between three and seven or eight steps forward and one to five or six steps back, depending on the specific type.

In Bulgaria, each region has their own type of horo. They differ by the rhythm of the music and the steps taken. There are no two horo dances with similar steps. There are probably over one hundred types of horo dances in the Bulgarian folklore.

In the past, the horo dance had a social role in Bulgarian society. It was mainly for fun, as a contest of skills, or for show, leading to the development of the variety of horo dances. There are hora for people with little skill that can be learned in five to ten minutes, but there are also very sophisticated dances that cannot be learned unless one is fluent in many of the simpler dances.

=== Oro in North Macedonia ===
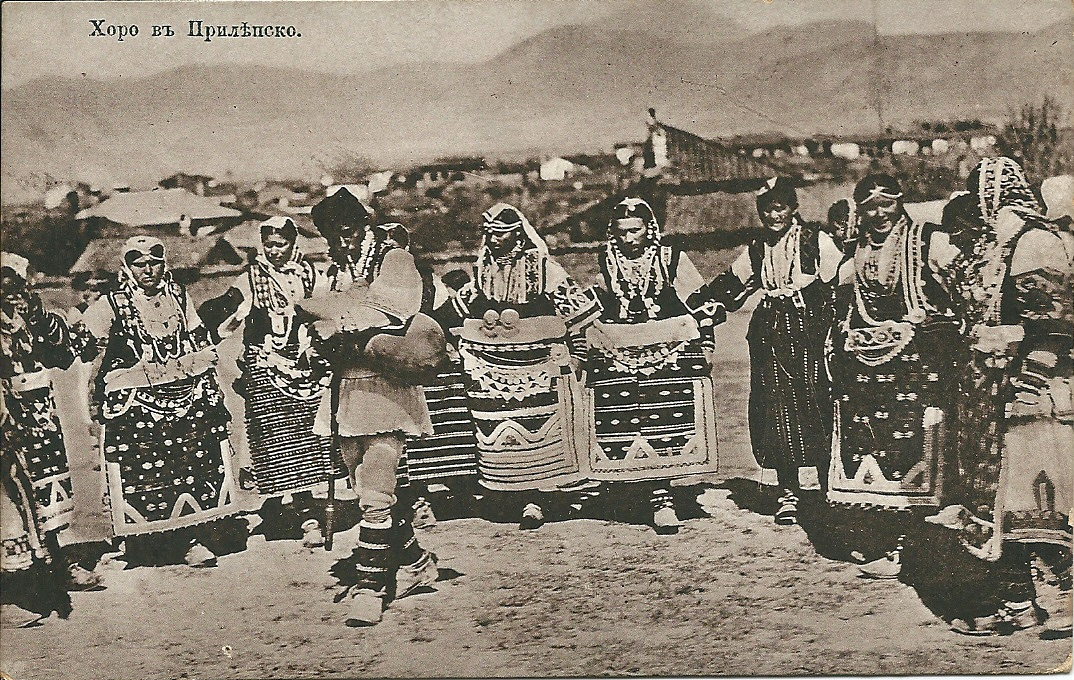
Women in Prilep, playing oro, beginning of the 20th century

North Macedonia uses the Cyrillic spelling of oro. The origins of the word oro vary from its use in socializing and celebrating to historical dancing before going into battle. Teshkoto, translated as "The difficult one", is one of those, danced by men only, the music of which reflects the sorrow and mood of war. The oro is danced in a circle, with men and women holding one another by hand. They are used to celebrate occasions such as weddings, christenings, name-days, national and religious holidays, graduations, and birthdays.

=== Roma horo ===
The horo is also popular among the Roma of Southeastern Europe, and the dancing is practically the same as that of the neighboring ethnicities. Roma Horos, and Roma music in general, are very much appreciated among the non-Roma in the Balkans, as they also have a reputation as skillful performers of other people's folk music.

=== Jewish horah ===
==== Klezmer horah ====
In klezmer music, the horah refers to a circle dance. The horah has a slow, limping gait in triple meter, often three/eight time (3/8), and generally leads into a faster and more upbeat duple meter, usually a freylekh or a bulgar. Among Yiddish-speaking Jews, the triple-meter horah has also been called zhok (Romanian joc, 'dance') or krumer tants (Yiddish: 'crooked dance').

==== Diasporic horah ====
The horah (הורה), which differs somewhat from that of some of the Eastern European countries, is widespread in the Jewish diaspora and played a foundational role in modern Israeli folk dancing. It became the symbol of the reconstruction of the country by the socialistic-agricultural Zionist movement. Although horah was culturally adopted from Southeast Europe, it became even more popular with the Jewish diaspora due to the Hora Agadati dance. In 1924, the dancer and choreographer Baruch Agadati choreographed a dance based on the Romanian hora dance that became known as "Hora Agadati". It was performed by the Ohel Workers' Theatre, which toured pioneer settlements in the Jezreel Valley. According to Gurit Kadman, the original melody was a Moldavian folk tune (Baruch Agadati was born in the Bessarabia Governorate) and Gurit asked Uriya Boskovitz to write a new one. About the same time Ze’ev Havatselet wrote lyrics to the tune (found, e.g., in the Library of Congress). Now the dance is usually performed to Israeli folk songs, and sometimes to Jewish songs, often to the music of "Hava Nagila".

To start the dance, everybody forms a circle, holding hands or interlocking arms behind their backs or on their shoulders, and steps forward toward the left with the right foot, then follows with the left foot. The right foot is then brought back, followed by the left foot. This is done while holding hands and circling together in a fast and cheerful motion to the left. Large groups allow for the creation of several concentric circles, or a large spiral formation.

In the early days, horah was popular mainly in kibbutzim and small communities, often continuing for hours.

The horah became popular in group dances throughout Israel, and at weddings and other celebrations by Jews in Israel, the United States, United Kingdom, and Canada. The dance appeared in North America in the early 20th century, well before the modern creation of the state of Israel, brought directly from Eastern Europe by Jewish immigrants.

At Jewish weddings during the horah it is customary to raise the bride and groom, each on their own chair and holding a handkerchief between them, following Jewish tradition. This is also done at b'nai mitzvah, where the honoree and sometimes his or her family members are also raised on a chair, copying the wedding tradition.

The song "Hora", sung by Avi Toledano, who represented Israel in the Eurovision Song Contest 1982, is based on this dance.

=== Other variants ===
==== Horon in Turkey ====
Horon in several variants is danced in Black Sea Region / Pontos of modern-day Turkey.

==== Oro in Montenegro ====
The oro (Serbian Cyrillic: оро) circle dance should not be confused with the Montenegrin Oro dance of Montenegro and Herzegovina, which is a paired courtship dance. Its name comes from the Serbian оrао, meaning "eagle".

==== Perinița ====
Perinița is a traditional Romanian wedding folk dance. The dance is typical in the Muntenia region.

== See also ==
- Adana (dance), a Macedonian oro
- Circle dance
- Horae
- Khorovod, an Eastern European circle dance
- Kolo (dance), Serbian, Croatian and Bosnian circle dance
- Kola (dance), Belarusian circle dance
- Perinița, Romanian circle dance
- Syrtos
- Tresenica, a Macedonian oro performed by women
