= Yemenite step =

Jewish folk dance step

The Yemenite step (Tza’ad Temani) is a dance step widely practiced by Yemenite Jewish men and women. It originates from the dancing of Yemenite Jews.

== Description ==
Yemenite step (tza'ad Temani) is a popular dance performed Jews during weddings and other Jewish occasions. The basic Tza'ad Temani step provides a swaying movement that changes the dancer's direction of motion, although the dancer may face forward throughout the step. It is usually a sideways movement, but may be done moving backward and forward (or vice versa). It consists of three steps, with a short pause on the final step for a "quick, quick, slow" tempo.

The most common variations are known as a right Temani (or Yemenite right), and left Temani (or Yemenite left). (The alternate form of each name—placing the adjective after the noun—is due to a common preference among dance teachers to emphasize the name of the step rather than its direction.) Each of these names specifies both the direction of the first movement, and the foot on which the movement begins (and ends).

The following description of the right Yemenite step explains the footwork and direction of movement:

1. Beginning with weight on left foot, step sideways to the right. Weight moves right, onto the right foot.
2. Shift weight left, onto the left foot, which may stay in place or move slightly backward.
3. Cross right foot in front of and slightly past the left foot, and step on right foot. Weight moves left, onto the right foot.
4. Hold. Weight stays on right foot. Left leg remains behind and slightly to the right, with toe on the ground for balance.

Reversing the above footwork and direction of movement will give the details of the left Yemenite step.

== Terminology ==
Dance teachers have also applied the name Yemenite to steps that differ from the classic Yemenite step but retain enough similarity to make the name helpful for teaching or descriptive purposes. Thus the back Yemenite, the name of which specifies the direction of the first movement and can be expanded to specify the starting foot. Similarly, some teachers may use phrases such as Yemenite-hop, or Yemenite-pivot to describe an otherwise-normal Yemenite step that ends with the specified movement rather than a hold.

== See also ==
- International folk dance
- Dance in Israel
- Jewish dance
- Yemeni Music
