= Gurit Kadman =

Israeli dance instructor and choreographer

- גורית קדמן
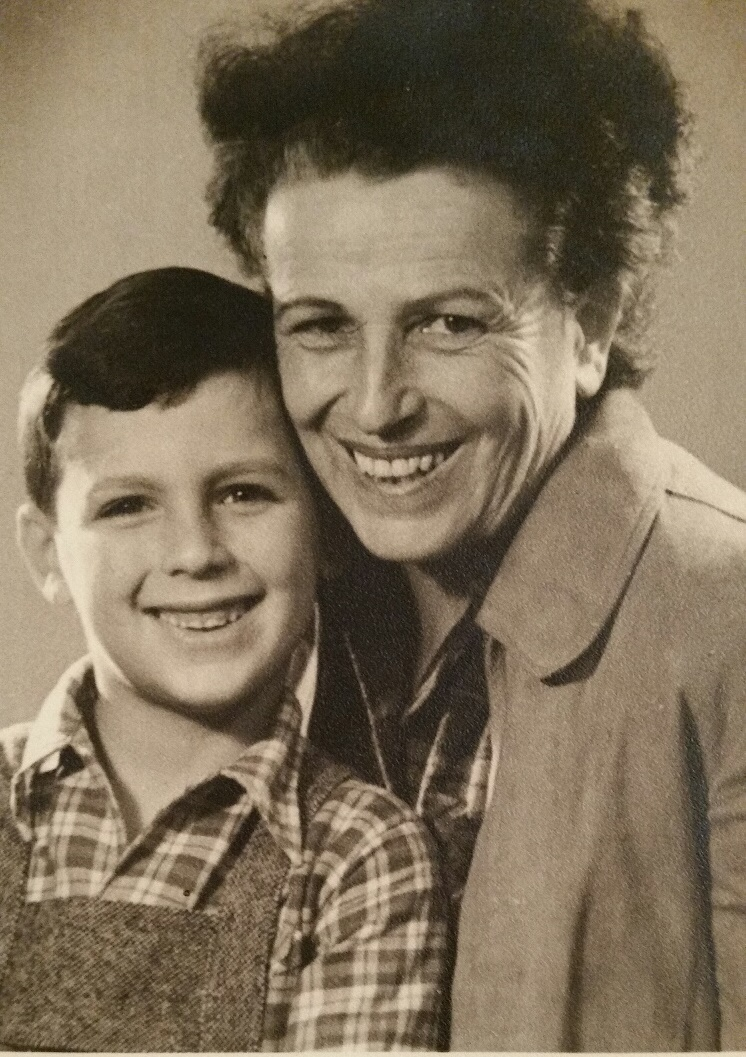
- Born: Gertrude (Gert) Loewenstein; 2 March 1897; Leipzig, Germany
- Died: 27 March 1987 (aged 90); Israel
- Other name: Gert Kadman
- Occupations: Dance instructor and choreographer
- Known for: Israeli folk dancing
- Awards: Israel Prize (1981)

Gurit Kadman (Hebrew: גורית קדמן; b. March 2, 1897 - March 27, 1987) was an Israeli dance instructor and choreographer, and is considered the mother of Israeli folk dancing.

== Biography ==
Gertrude (Gert) Loewenstein (later Gurit Kadman) was born in Leipzig, Germany to an assimilated Jewish family that traced its roots to Prague. In her youth she was active in the Wandervogel German youth movement.

In 1919, she married Leo Kaufman, and the couple joined the Blau Weiss Zionist youth movement and began agricultural training in preparation for a communal life in Palestine. Her son, Raphael, was born before they left.

In 1920, they immigrated to Mandate Palestine and were among the founders of the communal settlement Heftziba, first near Hadera, where another son, Amnon, was born, and then at its permanent location in the Jezreel Valley. Later, they changed the family name to Kadman and Gert became Gurit.

In 1925, she accompanied her husband on an educational mission to Austria, where their daughter, Ayala, was born. Upon their return, Leo was employed by the Histadrut. In 1931, the family left the kibbutz and moved to Tel Aviv.

== Awards and honors ==
- In 1981, she received the Israel Prize, for dance.

== Publications ==
- Am Roked ("A Dancing People"), 1964
- Ethnic Dance In Israel, 1982

== See also ==
- List of Israel Prize recipients
