= 2013 in film =

The following is an overview of the events of 2013 in film, including the highest-grossing films, film festivals, award ceremonies and a list of films released and notable deaths. Three popular films (Top Gun, Jurassic Park, and The Wizard of Oz) were re-released in 3D and IMAX.

== Evaluation of the year ==
Richard Brody of The New Yorker said,

The year 2013 has been an amazing one for movies, though maybe every year is an amazing year for movies if one is ready to be amazed by movies. It's also a particularly apt year to make a list of the best films. Making a list is not merely a numerical act but also a polemical one, and the best of this year's films are polemical in their assertion of the singularity of cinema, as well as of the art form's opposition to the disposable images of television. The 2013 crop comprises an unplanned, if not accidental, collective declaration of the essence of the cinema, an art of images and sounds that, at their best, don't exist to tell a story or to tantalize the audience (though they may well do so) but, rather, to reflect a crisis in the life of the filmmaker and the state of the artist's mind or, even, soul.

He also stated,

The best movies this year are films of combative cinema, audacious inventions in vision. The specificity and originality of their moment-to-moment creation of images offers new ways for viewers to confront the notion of what "narrative" might be. Their revitalization of storytelling as experience restores to the cinema its primordial mode of redefining consciousness. It's significant that some of the filmmakers in the forefront of that charge are from the generation of the elders, innovators of the seventies. In the age of radical cinema sparked by digital technology, the rise of independent producers, and the ready ubiquity of the history of cinema (thanks to DVDs and streaming video), these older directors have experienced a glorious second youth. That artistic rejuvenation is also due to the stimulating ambiance of actual youth—a young generation of freethinking cinephiles, critics, and filmmakers who, thanks to the Internet, make their appreciation of these sublime extremes widely and quickly known, even when the mainstream of viewers and reviewers miss out.

== Highest-grossing films ==
The top 10 films released in 2013 by worldwide gross are as follows:

Highest-grossing films of 2013
Rank	Title	Distributor	Worldwide gross (Note: in 2013 USD.)
1	Frozen	Disney	$1,280,802,282
2	Iron Man 3	Disney	$1,214,811,252
3	Despicable Me 2	Universal	$970,766,005
4	The Hobbit: The Desolation of Smaug	Warner Bros.	$958,366,855
5	The Hunger Games: Catching Fire	Lionsgate	$865,011,746
6	Fast & Furious 6	Universal	$788,679,850
7	Monsters University	Disney	$743,559,607
8	Gravity	Warner Bros.	$723,192,705
9	Man of Steel	Warner Bros.	$670,145,518
10	Thor: The Dark World	Disney	$644,783,140

=== Box office records ===
- Frozen and Iron Man 3 both grossed over $1.2 billion, making them among the 50 highest-grossing films of all time.
- Frozen became the second animated film after Toy Story 3 (2010) to gross $1 billion, and became the highest-grossing animated film at release.
- Iron Man 3 became the second film in the Marvel Cinematic Universe to gross over $1 billion, after The Avengers.
- Despicable Me 2 became the highest-grossing non-Disney animated film worldwide, surpassing the 9-year record of Shrek 2 (2004). However it was surpassed by Minions in 2015. It also became the highest-grossing film ever distributed by Universal in its initial release, surpassing the initial gross of Jurassic Park (1993), which grossed $914 million in its initial release 20 years earlier.
- After being re-released in 3-D, Jurassic Park surpassed the $1 billion mark, and is currently the 55th highest-grossing film of all time. It also became the first film distributed by Universal to gross $1 billion.

== Events ==
- 2nd AACTA International Awards
- 18th Critics' Choice Awards
- 19th Screen Actors Guild Awards
- 28th Independent Spirit Awards
- 33rd Golden Raspberry Awards
- 39th Saturn Awards
- 61st FAMAS Awards
- 63rd Berlin International Film Festival
- 66th British Academy Film Awards
- 70th Golden Globe Awards
- 70th Venice International Film Festival
- 85th Academy Awards
- 2013 Cannes Film Festival
- 2013 MTV Movie Awards
- 2013 Sundance Film Festival
- 2013 Toronto International Film Festival

== Awards ==
Category/Organization	71st Golden Globe Awards January 12, 2014		19th Critics' Choice Awards January 16, 2014	Producers, Directors, Screen Actors, and Writers Guild Awards	67th BAFTA Awards February 16, 2014	86th Academy Awards March 2, 2014
Category/Organization	Drama	Musical or Comedy	19th Critics' Choice Awards January 16, 2014	Producers, Directors, Screen Actors, and Writers Guild Awards	67th BAFTA Awards February 16, 2014	86th Academy Awards March 2, 2014
Best Film	12 Years a Slave	American Hustle	12 Years a Slave	12 Years a Slave (tie); Gravity (tie)	12 Years a Slave	
Best Director	Alfonso Cuarón; Gravity					
Best Actor	Matthew McConaughey; Dallas Buyers Club	Leonardo DiCaprio; The Wolf of Wall Street	Matthew McConaughey; Dallas Buyers Club		Chiwetel Ejiofor; 12 Years a Slave	Matthew McConaughey; Dallas Buyers Club
Best Actress	Cate Blanchett; Blue Jasmine	Amy Adams; American Hustle	Cate Blanchett; Blue Jasmine			
Best Supporting Actor	Jared Leto; Dallas Buyers Club				Barkhad Abdi; Captain Phillips	Jared Leto; Dallas Buyers Club
Best Supporting Actress	Jennifer Lawrence; American Hustle		Lupita Nyong'o; 12 Years a Slave		Jennifer Lawrence; American Hustle	Lupita Nyong'o; 12 Years a Slave
Best Screenplay, Adapted	Spike Jonze; Her		John Ridley; 12 Years a Slave	Billy Ray; Captain Philips	Steve Coogan and Jeff Pope; Philomena	John Ridley; 12 Years a Slave
Best Screenplay, Original	Spike Jonze; Her		Spike Jonze; Her		David O. Russell; American Hustle	Spike Jonze; Her
Best Animated Film	Frozen					
Best Original Score	All Is Lost; Alex Ebert		Gravity; Steven Price	—N/a	Gravity; Steven Price	
Best Original Song	"Ordinary Love"; Mandela: Long Walk to Freedom		"Let It Go"; Frozen	—N/a	—N/a	"Let It Go"; Frozen
Best Foreign Language Film	The Great Beauty		Blue Is the Warmest Colour	—N/a	The Great Beauty	
Best Documentary	—N/a	—N/a	20 Feet from Stardom	We Steal Secrets: The Story of WikiLeaks	The Act of Killing	20 Feet from Stardom

Palme d'Or (66th Cannes Film Festival):

Blue Is the Warmest Colour (La Vie d'Adèle – Chapitres 1 & 2), directed by Abdellatif Kechiche, France

Golden Lion (70th Venice International Film Festival):

Sacro GRA, directed by Gianfranco Rosi, Italy

Golden Bear (63rd Berlin International Film Festival):

Child's Pose (Poziția Copilului), directed by Călin Peter Netzer, Romania

== 2013 films ==
=== By country/region ===
- List of American films of 2013
- List of Argentine films of 2013
- List of Australian films of 2013
- List of Bangladeshi films of 2013
- List of Brazilian films of 2013
- List of British films of 2013
- List of Canadian films of 2013
- List of Chinese films of 2013
- List of French films of 2013
- List of Hong Kong films of 2013
- List of Italian films of 2013
- List of Indian films of 2013
  - List of Assamese films
  - List of Bengali films of 2013
  - List of Bollywood films of 2013
  - List of Gujarati films
  - List of Kannada films of 2013
  - List of Malayalam films of 2013
  - List of Marathi films of 2013
  - List of Odia films of 2013
  - List of Punjabi films of 2013
  - List of Tamil films of 2013
  - List of Telugu films of 2013
  - List of Tulu films
- List of Japanese films of 2013
- List of Mexican films of 2013
- List of Pakistani films of 2013
- List of Russian films of 2013
- List of South Korean films of 2013
- List of Spanish films of 2013
- List of Turkish films of 2013

=== By genre/medium ===
- List of action films of 2013
- List of animated feature films of 2013
- List of avant-garde films of 2013
- List of comedy films of 2013
- List of drama films of 2013
- List of horror films of 2013
- List of science fiction films of 2013
- List of thriller films of 2013
- List of western films of 2013

== Deaths ==
Month	Date	Name	Age	Country	Profession	Notable films
January	1	Patti Page	85	US	Actress, Singer	Boys' Night Out; Elmer Gantry
January	1	Barbara Werle	84	US	Actress	Battle of the Bulge; Seconds
January	2	Ned Wertimer	89	US	Actor	Pirates of the Caribbean: At World's End; Mame
January	2	Zaharira Harifai	83	Israel	Actress	The Fox in the Chicken Coop; The Policeman
January	4	Tony Lip	82	US	Actor	The Godfather; Goodfellas
January	6	Jacques Fonteray	94	France	Costume Designer	Barbarella; Moonraker
January	6	Roy Walker	81	UK	Production Designer	The Shining; Eyes Wide Shut
January	7	David R. Ellis	60	US	Director, Stuntman	Snakes on a Plane; Cellular
January	11	Mariangela Melato	71	Italy	Actress	Flash Gordon; So Fine
January	13	Bille Brown	61	Australia	Actor	Fierce Creatures; Killer Elite
January	14	Conrad Bain	89	Canada	Actor	Bananas; C.H.O.M.P.S.
January	15	Nagisa Oshima	81	Japan	Director	Merry Christmas, Mr. Lawrence; In the Realm of the Senses
January	16	Perrette Pradier	74	France	Actress	Behold a Pale Horse; House of Cards
January	17	Fernando Guillén	81	Spain	Actor	Women on the Verge of a Nervous Breakdown; All About My Mother
January	21	Michael Winner	77	UK	Director, Screenwriter	Death Wish; The Mechanic
January	22	Leslie Frankenheimer	64	US	Set Decorator	Blade Runner; The Blues Brothers
January	23	Susan Douglas Rubeš	87	Austria	Actress	Five; The Outside Chance of Maximilian Glick
January	25	Normand Corbeil	56	Canada	Composer	Double Jeopardy; The Art of War
January	26	Patricia Lovell	83	Australia	Producer	Picnic at Hanging Rock; Gallipoli
January	26	Lloyd Phillips	63	South Africa	Producer	Inglourious Basterds; 12 Monkeys
January	28	Keith Marsh	87	UK	Actor	Daleks' Invasion Earth 2150 A.D.; Scrooge
January	29	Bernard Horsfall	82	UK	Actor	Braveheart; Gandhi
January	29	Garrett Lewis	77	US	Set Decorator	Hook; Pretty Woman
January	30	Patty Andrews	94	US	Singer, Actress	Road to Rio; In the Navy
February	1	Robin Sachs	62	UK	Actor	The Lost World: Jurassic Park; Galaxy Quest
February	2	John Kerr	81	US	Actor	South Pacific; Tea and Sympathy
February	3	Peter Gilmore	81	Germany	Actor	Carry On; Warlords of Atlantis
February	5	Stuart Freeborn	98	UK	Makeup Artist	Star Wars; Superman
February	5	Gerry Hambling	86	UK	Film Editor	Mississippi Burning; Fame
February	8	Chris Brinker	42	US	Producer, Director	The Boondock Saints; Bad Country
February	8	Alan Sharp	79	UK	Screenwriter	Rob Roy; Ulzana's Raid
February	14	Richard J. Collins	98	US	Screenwriter	The Adventures of Hajji Baba; Song of Russia
February	17	Richard Briers	79	UK	Actor	Peter Pan; Much Ado About Nothing
February	18	Matt Mattox	91	US	Actor, Dancer	Guys and Dolls; Seven Brides for Seven Brothers
February	18	Joel Silberg	85	Israel	Director, Screenwriter	Breakin'; Lambada
February	19	John Brascia	80	US	Actor, Dancer	White Christmas; Meet Me in Las Vegas
February	19	Lou Myers	77	US	Actor	The Wedding Planner; How Stella Got Her Groove Back
February	21	Del Tenney	82	US	Director	The Horror of Party Beach; The Curse of the Living Corpse
February	22	George Ives	87	US	Actor	Intolerable Cruelty; The Man Who Wasn't There
February	27	Dale Robertson	89	US	Actor	The Outcasts of Poker Flat; Son of Sinbad
February	28	Armando Trovajoli	95	Italy	Composer	Yesterday, Today and Tomorrow; A Special Day
March	1	Pat Keen	79	UK	Actress	Without a Clue; Shadowlands
March	1	Ric Menello	60	US	Screenwriter	The Immigrant; Two Lovers
March	3	José Sancho	68	Spain	Actor	Live Flesh; Talk to Her
March	4	Michael D. Moore	98	Canada	Actor, Director	The Dramatic Life of Abraham Lincoln; The King of Kings
March	5	Robert Relyea	82	US	Producer, Executive	Last Action Hero; The Day of the Dolphin
March	5	Arthur Storch	87	US	Actor	The Exorcist; The Strange One
March	7	Damiano Damiani	90	Italy	Screenwriter, Director	Amityville II: The Possession; The Devil Is a Woman
March	13	Malachi Throne	84	US	Actor	Catch Me If You Can; Beau Geste
March	16	Frank Thornton	92	UK	Actor	Are You Being Served?; Gosford Park
March	17	Rosine Delamare	101	France	Costume Designer	The Earrings of Madame de…; The Night of the Generals
March	20	Risë Stevens	99	US	Actress, Singer	Going My Way; Journey Back to Oz
March	21	Robert Nichols	88	US	Actor	The Thing from Another World; Giant
March	23	Norman Palmer	94	US	Film Editor	The Incredible Journey; Midnight Madness
March	26	Don Payne	48	US	Screenwriter	Thor; Fantastic Four: Rise of the Silver Surfer
March	27	Fay Kanin	95	US	Screenwriter	Teacher's Pet; The Opposite Sex
March	28	Richard Griffiths	65	UK	Actor	Harry Potter; Withnail and I
March	29	Enzo Jannacci	77	Italy	Actor, Singer	L'udienza; A Joke of Destiny
March	30	Brian Ackland-Snow	72	UK	Production Designer, Art Director	A Room with a View; Superman III
March	31	Helena Carroll	84	UK	Actress	Rocky V; The Friends of Eddie Coyle
April	2	Jesús Franco	82	Spain	Director, Screenwriter	Count Dracula; The Blood of Fu Manchu
April	2	Milo O'Shea	86	Ireland	Actor	Ulysses; The Verdict
April	3	Ruth Prawer Jhabvala	85	Germany	Screenwriter	A Room with a View; Jefferson in Paris
April	4	Roger Ebert	70	US	Film Critic, Screenwriter	Beyond the Valley of the Dolls; Beneath the Valley of the Ultra-Vixens
April	4	Tommy Tycho	84	Australia	Composer	Young Einstein; Reckless Kelly
April	6	Bigas Luna	67	Spain	Director	Jamón Jamón; Bámbola
April	7	Les Blank	77	US	Documentarian	Burden of Dreams; In Heaven There Is No Beer?
April	7	Mickey Rose	77	US	Screenwriter	Bananas; Take the Money and Run
April	8	Richard Brooker	58	UK	Actor	Friday the 13th Part III; Deathstalker
April	8	Annette Funicello	70	US	Actress, Singer	Beach Party; Babes in Toyland
April	8	Greg Kramer	51	UK	Actor	The Day After Tomorrow; 300
April	8	Sara Montiel	85	Spain	Actress, Singer	Vera Cruz; Serenade
April	11	Jonathan Winters	87	US	Actor	It's a Mad, Mad, Mad, Mad World; The Shadow
April	12	Michael France	51	US	Screenwriter	GoldenEye; Fantastic Four
April	15	Richard LeParmentier	66	US	Actor	Star Wars; Who Framed Roger Rabbit
April	17	Deanna Durbin	91	Canada	Actress, Singer	For the Love of Mary; Lady on a Train
April	19	Allan Arbus	95	US	Actor	Coffy; W.C. Fields and Me
April	22	Vivi Bach	73	Denmark	Actress	Death Drums Along the River; Assignment K
April	22	Richie Havens	72	US	Actor, Singer	I'm Not There; Catch My Soul
April	23	Norman Jones	80	UK	Actor	The Abominable Dr. Phibes; You Only Live Twice
April	25	Sean Caffrey	73	Ireland	Actor	The Viking Queen; When Dinosaurs Ruled the Earth
April	25	Virginia Gibson	88	US	Actress, Singer	Seven Brides for Seven Brothers; Funny Face
April	25	Johnny Lockwood	92	UK	Actor	Moulin Rouge!; The Rage in Placid Lake
April	25	Anna Proclemer	89	Italy	Actress	Illustrious Corpses; Journey to Italy
April	26	Jacqueline Brookes	82	US	Actress	The Naked Gun 2½: The Smell of Fear; The Good Son
April	27	Brad Lesley	54	US	Actor	Little Big League; Mr. Baseball
April	30	Mike Gray	77	US	Screenwriter	The China Syndrome; Code of Silence
May	4	Mario Machado	78	China	Actor	RoboCop; Scarface
May	5	Rossella Falk	86	Italy	Actress	Modesty Blaise; 8½
May	5	Dean Jeffries	80	US	Stuntman	Die Hard with a Vengeance; The Blues Brothers
May	7	Ray Harryhausen	92	US	Visual Effects Artist, Producer	Clash of the Titans; Jason and the Argonauts
May	7	Aubrey Woods	85	UK	Actor	Willy Wonka & the Chocolate Factory; Wuthering Heights
May	8	Jeanne Cooper	84	US	Actress	Tony Rome; Kansas City Bomber
May	8	Bryan Forbes	86	UK	Director, Screenwriter, Actor	The Stepford Wives; The League of Gentlemen
May	8	Taylor Mead	88	US	Actor	Coffee and Cigarettes; Frogs for Snakes
May	15	Linden Chiles	80	US	Actor	Counterpoint; Texas Across the River
May	17	Penne Hackforth-Jones	63	Australia	Actress	Muriel's Wedding; Mao's Last Dancer
May	18	Steve Forrest	87	US	Actor	Spies Like Us; Mommie Dearest
May	18	Arthur Malet	85	UK	Actor	Mary Poppins; Halloween
May	21	Frank Comstock	90	US	Composer, Orchestrator	The Last Time I Saw Archie; Hello, Dolly!
May	22	Richard Thorp	81	UK	Actor	The Dam Busters; The Barretts of Wimpole Street
May	28	Eddi Arent	88	Germany	Actor	Traitor's Gate; Circus of Fear
May	28	Eddie Romero	88	Philippines	Director, Producer, Screenwriter	Black Mama White Mama; Cry of Battle
May	29	Nino Baragli	88	Italy	Film Editor	The Good, the Bad and the Ugly; Once Upon a Time in the West
May	29	Franca Rame	83	Italy	Actress	Rascel-Fifì; Lo svitato
May	30	Helen Hanft	79	US	Actress	License to Drive; Arthur
May	31	Jean Stapleton	90	US	Actress	You've Got Mail; Bells Are Ringing
June	1	William Cartwright	92	US	Film Editor	The Devil's Brigade; The Bridge at Remagen
June	5	Katherine Woodville	74	UK	Actress	Posse; The Informers
June	6	Maxine Stuart	94	US	Actress	Kitten with a Whip; Days of Wine and Roses
June	6	Esther Williams	91	US	Actress	Million Dollar Mermaid; Neptune's Daughter
June	9	Harry Lewis	93	US	Actor	Key Largo; Gun Crazy
June	10	Valentin de Vargas	78	US	Actor	Touch of Evil; Hatari!
June	18	Valerie Allen	77	US	Actress	Pillow Talk; Bells Are Ringing
June	19	James Gandolfini	51	US	Actor	Enough Said; Get Shorty
June	20	Diosa Costello	100	Puerto Rico	Actress	Miss Sadie Thompson; The Bullfighters
June	21	Charles L. Campbell	82	US	Sound Engineer	Back to the Future; E.T. the Extra-Terrestrial
June	21	Diane Clare	74	UK	Actress	Ice Cold in Alex; The Haunting
June	21	Elliott Reid	93	US	Actor	Gentlemen Prefer Blondes; Inherit the Wind
June	22	Gary David Goldberg	68	US	Director, Screenwriter	Must Love Dogs; Bye Bye Love
June	23	Richard Matheson	87	US	Screenwriter	Somewhere in Time; Twilight Zone: The Movie
June	23	Darryl Read	61	UK	Actor, Singer	The Lost Continent; Great Catherine
June	29	Jim Kelly	67	US	Actor, Martial Artist	Enter the Dragon; Black Belt Jones
July	1	Paul Jenkins	74	US	Actor	Chinatown; Network
July	2	Victor Lundin	83	US	Actor	Robinson Crusoe on Mars; The Greatest Story Ever Told
July	3	Frank Morriss	85	US	Film Editor	Romancing the Stone; Short Circuit
July	3	PJ Torokvei	62	Canada	Screenwriter	Real Genius; Back to School
July	7	Joe Conley	85	US	Actor	Cast Away; Crime of Passion
July	7	Anna Wing	98	UK	Actress	Son of Rambow; Providence
July	10	Paul Bhattacharjee	53	UK	Actor	Casino Royale; The Best Exotic Marigold Hotel
July	13	Cory Monteith	31	Canada	Actor, Singer	Monte Carlo; Final Destination 3
July	14	Dennis Burkley	67	US	Actor	The Doors; Son in Law
July	17	Vincenzo Cerami	72	Italy	Screenwriter	Life Is Beautiful; The Little Devil
July	19	Poncie Ponce	80	US	Actor, Singer	Speedway; The World's Greatest Lover
July	19	Mel Smith	60	UK	Actor, Director	The Princess Bride; Twelfth Night
July	22	Dennis Farina	69	US	Actor	Saving Private Ryan; Midnight Run
July	23	Rona Anderson	86	UK	Actress	Scrooge; The Prime of Miss Jean Brodie
July	24	Donald Symington	87	US	Actor	Annie Hall; Mighty Aphrodite
July	25	Bernadette Lafont	74	France	Actress	Broken English; To Catch a Spy
July	27	Suzanne Krull	47	US	Actress	Race to Witch Mountain; How the Grinch Stole Christmas
July	28	Eileen Brennan	80	US	Actress	Private Benjamin; The Last Picture Show
July	31	Michael Ansara	91	Syria	Actor	The Message; Julius Caesar
August	1	Gail Kobe	82	US	Actress	The Ten Commandments; Gunsmoke in Tucson
August	2	Barbara Trentham	68	US	Actress	Rollerball; The Possession of Joel Delaney
August	7	Margaret Pellegrini	89	US	Actress	The Wizard of Oz; Johnny Got His Gun
August	8	Karen Black	74	US	Actress	The Great Gatsby; Five Easy Pieces
August	10	Haji	67	Canada	Actress	Faster, Pussycat! Kill! Kill!; The Killing of a Chinese Bookie
August	11	Henry Polic II	68	US	Actor	The Last Remake of Beau Geste; Scavenger Hunt
August	14	Lisa Robin Kelly	43	US	Actress	Jawbreaker; Clubland
August	14	Luciano Martino	79	Italy	Producer	The Merchant of Venice; The Mountain of the Cannibal God
August	15	August Schellenberg	77	Canada	Actor	Free Willy; The New World
August	19	Russell S. Doughten	86	US	Producer, Screenwriter, Director	The Blob; A Thief in the Night
August	19	Stephenie McMillan	71	UK	Set Decorator	Harry Potter; The English Patient
August	19	Lee Thompson Young	29	US	Actor	Friday Night Lights; The Hills Have Eyes 2
August	20	Elmore Leonard	87	US	Screenwriter	Joe Kidd; The Rosary Murders
August	20	Ted Post	95	US	Director	Beneath the Planet of the Apes; Hang 'Em High
August	23	Gilbert Taylor	99	UK	Cinematographer	Star Wars; The Omen
August	24	Julie Harris	87	US	Actress	East of Eden; The Haunting
August	26	Gerard Murphy	64	Ireland	Actor	Batman Begins; Waterworld
August	27	Chris Kennedy	64	Australia	Director, Producer, Screenwriter	Doing Time for Patsy Cline; A Man's Gotta Do
August	28	Murray Gershenz	91	US	Actor	The Hangover; I Love You, Man
September	1	Tommy Morrison	44	US	Actor	Rocky V; They Live
September	3	José Ramón Larraz	84	Spain	Director	Vampyres; Symptoms
September	7	Fred Katz	94	US	Composer	The Little Shop of Horrors; Creature from the Haunted Sea
September	8	Louise Currie	100	US	Actress	Adventures of Captain Marvel; The Ape Man
September	8	Lou Morheim	91	US	Screenwriter	The Beast from 20,000 Fathoms; Ma and Pa Kettle
September	9	Patricia Blair	80	US	Actress	The Electric Horseman; The Black Sleep
September	10	Don Nelson	86	US	Screenwriter	Herbie Goes to Monte Carlo; Hot Lead and Cold Feet
September	12	William A. Graham	87	US	Director	Return to the Blue Lagoon; Change of Habit
September	16	Patsy Swayze	86	US	Choreographer	Hope Floats; Urban Cowboy
September	17	Michael Giannatos	72	Turkey	Actor	Midnight Express; Captain Corelli's Mandolin
September	18	Marta Heflin	68	US	Actress	A Star Is Born; A Perfect Couple
September	18	Ken Norton	70	US	Actor	Mandingo; Drum
September	18	Richard C. Sarafian	83	US	Director, Actor	Vanishing Point; Fragment of Fear
September	19	Amidou	78	Morocco	Actor	Ronin; Sorcerer
September	22	Luciano Vincenzoni	87	Italy	Screenwriter	For a Few Dollars More; The Good, the Bad and the Ugly
September	23	Jane Connell	87	US	Actress	Mame; Dr. Jekyll and Ms. Hyde
September	27	John Calvert	102	US	Actor	Search for Danger; Youth on Trial
September	27	Phyllis Davis	73	US	Actress	Sweet Sugar; Terminal Island
September	27	A. C. Lyles	95	US	Producer	Night of the Lepus; Waco
September	27	Jay Robinson	83	US	Actor	The Robe; Bram Stoker's Dracula
September	29	Scott Workman	47	US	Stuntman	Transformers: Revenge of the Fallen; Godzilla
September	30	Anthony Hinds	91	UK	Screenwriter, Producer	The Phantom of the Opera; The Quatermass Xperiment
September	30	Ruth Maleczech	74	US	Actress	The Crucible; Nick and Norah's Infinite Playlist
October	1	Giuliano Gemma	75	Italy	Actor	Day of Anger; The Price of Power
October	2	Hilton A. Green	84	US	Producer	Psycho; Sixteen Candles
October	3	Virginia Vincent	95	US	Actress	The Hills Have Eyes; Love with the Proper Stranger
October	5	Carlo Lizzani	91	Italy	Director, Screenwriter	Attention! Bandits!; Requiescant
October	6	Paul Rogers	96	UK	Actor	A Midsummer Night's Dream; The Trials of Oscar Wilde
October	7	Patrice Chéreau	68	France	Actor, Screenwriter	The Last of the Mohicans; Intimacy
October	9	Daniel H. Blatt	76	US	Producer	The Howling; Cujo
October	10	Kumar Pallana	94	India	Actor	The Royal Tenenbaums; The Terminal
October	12	Mann Rubin	85	US	Screenwriter	Brainstorm; The Best of Everything
October	13	John Barrard	89	UK	Actor	Santa Claus: The Movie; Buster
October	16	Ed Lauter	74	US	Actor	The Longest Yard; Family Plot
October	17	Lou Scheimer	84	US	Producer, Voice Actor	Journey Back to Oz; Happily Ever After
October	19	Georges Descrières	83	France	Actor	Two for the Road; A Flea in Her Ear
October	19	Noel Harrison	79	UK	Actor, Singer	Hot Enough for June; The Best of Enemies
October	22	William Harrison	79	US	Screenwriter	Rollerball; Mountains of the Moon
October	24	Antonia Bird	62	UK	Director	Ravenous; Mad Love
October	25	Nigel Davenport	85	UK	Actor	Without a Clue; Chariots of Fire
October	25	Hal Needham	82	US	Director, Stuntman	Smokey and the Bandit; The Cannonball Run
October	25	Marcia Wallace	70	US	Actress	The Simpsons Movie; Teen Witch
October	27	Luigi Magni	85	Italy	Director, Screenwriter	The Conspirators; In the Name of the Sovereign People
October	27	Lou Reed	71	US	Actor, Singer	Blue in the Face; One-Trick Pony
October	29	Graham Stark	91	UK	Actor	The Pink Panther; Alfie
October	31	Chris Chase	74	US	Actress	Killer's Kiss; All That Jazz
November	4	Hans von Borsody	84	Austria	Actor	A Bridge Too Far; Bloodline
November	7	Paul Mantee	82	US	Actor	Robinson Crusoe on Mars; Apollo 13
November	11	Shirley Mitchell	94	US	Actress	The War of the Roses; Big Business
November	13	Barbara Lawrence	83	US	Actress	A Letter to Three Wives; Oklahoma!
November	13	Marvin Paige	86	US	Casting Director	Star Trek: The Motion Picture; Take the Money and Run
November	13	Al Ruscio	89	US	Actor	The Godfather Part III; Showgirls
November	15	Sheila Matthews Allen	84	US	Actress	The Poseidon Adventure; The Towering Inferno
November	19	Marc Breaux	89	US	Choreographer	The Sound of Music; Mary Poppins
November	22	Georges Lautner	87	France	Director, Screenwriter	The Professional; Les Tontons flingueurs
November	23	Jay Leggett	50	US	Actor, Screenwriter	Without a Paddle; Hero
November	25	Chico Hamilton	92	US	Composer	Repulsion; Coonskin
November	26	Arik Einstein	74	Israel	Singer, Actor	Sallah Shabati; Dalia and the Sailors
November	26	Marcello Gatti	89	Italy	Cinematographer	The Beloved; The Battle of Algiers
November	26	Tony Musante	77	US	Actor	The Last Run; The Detective
November	27	Lewis Collins	67	UK	Actor	Who Dares Wins; Confessions of a Driving Instructor
November	28	Danny Wells	72	Canada	Actor	Magnolia; Private Benjamin
November	30	Jean Kent	92	UK	Actress	Caravan; Good-Time Girl
November	30	Paul Walker	40	US	Actor	The Fast and the Furious; Flags of Our Fathers
December	2	Christopher Evan Welch	48	US	Actor	Vicky Cristina Barcelona; War of the Worlds
December	3	Ronald Hunter	70	US	Actor	Along Came Polly; National Lampoon's Van Wilder
December	3	Sefi Rivlin	66	Israel	Actor	The Fox in the Chicken Coop; The Secrets
December	5	Barry Jackson	75	UK	Actor	Aces High; Barry Lyndon
December	7	Édouard Molinaro	85	France	Director, Screenwriter	La Cage aux Folles; To Commit a Murder
December	9	Eleanor Parker	91	US	Actress	The Sound of Music; Detective Story
December	10	Rossana Podestà	79	Italy	Actress	Helen of Troy; Hercules
December	11	Garry Robbins	56	Canada	Actor	Wrong Turn; The Love Guru
December	12	Tom Laughlin	82	US	Actor, Director, Screenwriter	Billy Jack; The Born Losers
December	12	Audrey Totter	95	US	Actress	Lady in the Lake; The Set-Up
December	14	Peter O'Toole	81	UK	Actor	Lawrence of Arabia; My Favorite Year
December	15	Joan Fontaine	96	US	Actress	Rebecca; The Women
December	19	Marty Hornstein	76	US	Production Manager, Producer	Star Trek; Beverly Hills Cop III
December	23	Jeff Pollack	54	US	Director, Screenwriter	Above the Rim; Booty Call
December	23	Ted Richmond	103	US	Producer	Red Sun; Papillon
December	24	Frédéric Back	89	Canada	Animator	Crac; The Man Who Planted Trees
December	26	Marta Eggerth	101	Hungary	Actress, Singer	For Me and My Gal; Presenting Lily Mars
December	28	Joseph Ruskin	89	US	Actor	Smokin' Aces; The Scorpion King
December	29	Wojciech Kilar	81	Poland	Composer	The Pianist; Bram Stoker's Dracula
December	31	James Avery	68	US	Actor	The Brady Bunch Movie; Dr. Dolittle 2
December	31	John Fortune	74	UK	Actor	Saving Grace; Match Point

== Film debuts ==
- Barkhad Abdi – Captain Phillips
- Tawfeek Barhom – Farewell Baghdad
- Stephanie Beatriz – Short Term 12
- Margot Bingham – Burning Blue
- Josh Brener – The Internship
- Deragh Campbell – I Used to Be Darker
- Kid Cudi – Goodbye World
- Amyra Dastur – Issaq
- Natalia de Molina – Living Is Easy with Eyes Closed
- Ansel Elgort – Carrie
- Alícia Falcó – The Fear
- Julian Dennison – Shopping
- Fortune Feimster – The Secret Lives of Dorks
- Lady Gaga - Machete Kills
- Mia Goth – Nymphomaniac
- Mckenna Grace – Goodbye World
- Kelvin Harrison Jr. – 12 Years a Slave
- Callie Hernandez – Machete Kills
- Kobna Holdbrook-Smith – The Double
- Manny Jacinto – John Apple Jack
- Jasmine Cephas Jones – Titus
- Elena Kampouris – Labor Day
- Charlotte Kirk – Fractured
- Eugenia Kuzmina – Quarantine L.A.
- Fish Liew – Doomsday Party
- Jack Lowden – U Want Me 2 Kill Him?
- Isabela Merced – The House That Jack Built
- RJ Mitte – House of Last Things
- Michelle Mylett – Antisocial
- Ayumu Nakajima – Zentai
- Tig Notaro – In a World...
- Lupita Nyong'o – 12 Years a Slave
- Jenna Ortega – Iron Man 3
- Jake Picking – The Way, Way Back
- Dascha Polanco – Gimme Shelter
- Keith Powers – House Party: Tonight's the Night
- Margaret Qualley – Palo Alto
- Sushant Singh Rajput – Kai Po Che!
- Da'Vine Joy Randolph – Mother of George
- Angourie Rice – These Final Hours
- Ruby Rose – Around the Block
- Jessica Rothe – The Last Keepers
- Rosa Salazar – Epic
- Frederick Schmidt – Starred Up
- LaKeith Stanfield – Short Term 12
- Jimmy Tatro – Grown Ups 2
- Owen Teague – Contest
- William Tokarsky – The Hunger Games: Catching Fire
- Jacob Tremblay – The Smurfs 2
- Tuvana Türkay – Eksik Sayfalar
- Sophie Turner – Another Me
- Samara Weaving – Mystery Road
- Maisie Williams – Heatstroke
- Tom Williamson – All Cheerleaders Die
- Jimmy O. Yang – The Internship
- Zendaya – Super Buddies
