= List of Academy Award winners and nominees from Israel =

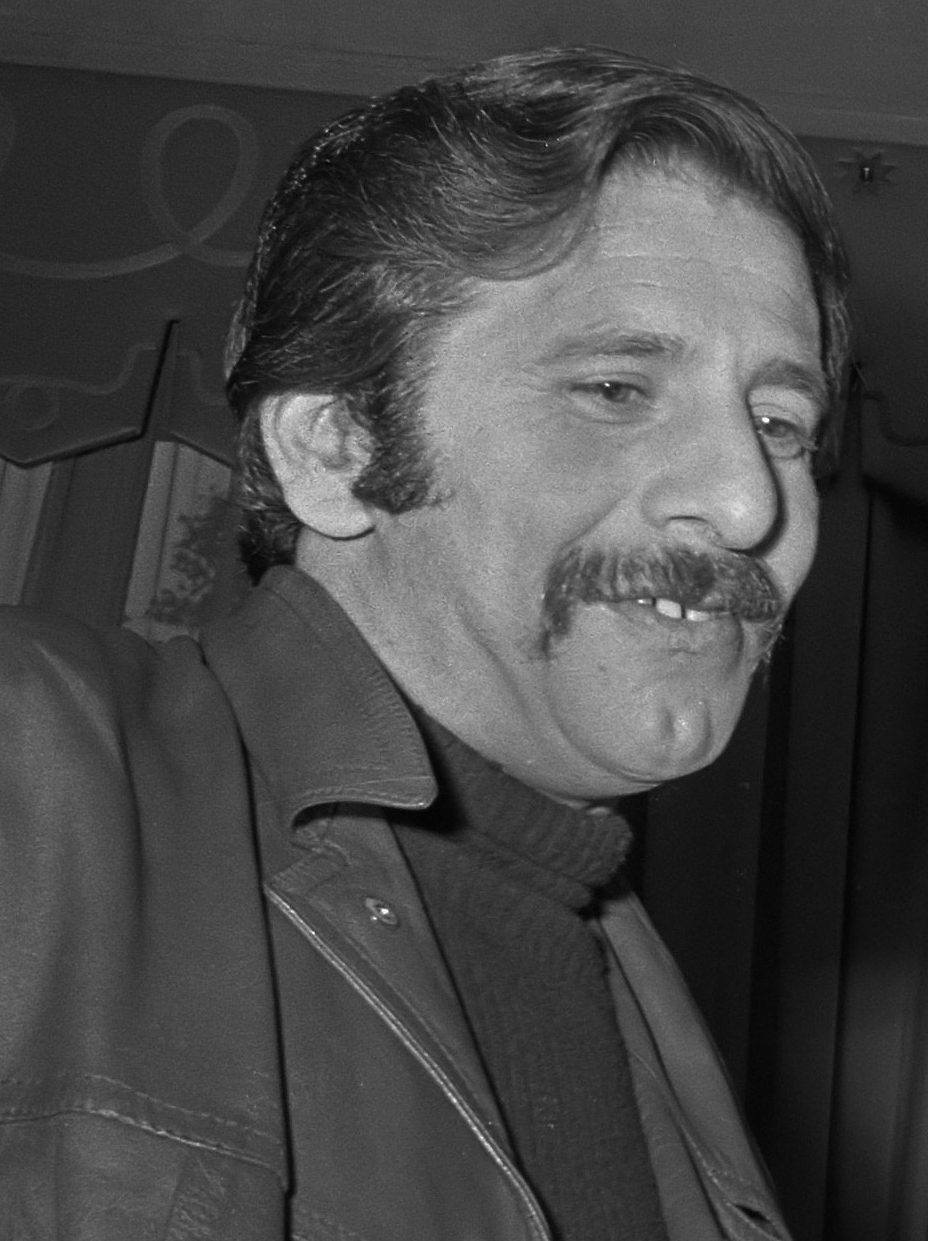
Topol nominated for 1971's Fiddler on the Roof.

The following is a list of Israeli people and films that have been nominated for or won Academy Awards.

== Best Actor in a Leading Role ==
Year	Name	Film	Status	Milestone / Notes	Ref.
1971	Chaim Topol	Fiddler on the Roof	Nominated	First Israeli nominated in any category. First Middle Eastern person nominated for an acting award.	

== Best Actress in a Leading Role ==
Year	Name	Film	Status	Milestone / Notes
2010	Natalie Portman	Black Swan	Won	First Israeli to win an award in any category.
2016	Natalie Portman	Jackie	Nominated	First Israeli to receive three nominations.

== Best Actress in a Supporting Role ==
Year	Name	Film	Status	Milestone / Notes
2004	Natalie Portman	Closer	Nominated	First and (to date) only Israeli woman ever nominated for an acting award.

== Best Picture ==
Year	Name	Film	Status	Milestone / Notes
1997	Arnon Milchan	L.A. Confidential	Nominated	Shared with Curtis Hanson, and Michael Nathanson.
2015	Arnon Milchan	The Revenant	Nominated	Shared with Steve Golin, Alejandro G. Iñárritu, Mary Parent, and Keith Redmon.

== Best Original Screenplay ==
Year	Name	Film	Status	Milestone / Notes
2009	Oren Moverman	The Messenger	Nominated	Shared with Alessandro Camon.

== Best Animated Feature ==
Year	Name	Film	Status	Milestone / Notes
2016	Osnat Shurer	Moana	Nominated	Shared with John Musker, and Ron Clements.
2021	Osnat Shurer	Raya and the Last Dragon	Nominated	Shared with Don Hall, Carlos López Estrada, and Peter Del Vecho.
2025	Natalie Portman	Arco	Nominated	Shared with Ugo Bienvenu, Félix de Givry, and Sophie Mas.

== Best Documentary Feature ==
Year	Name	Film	Status	Milestone / Notes	Ref.
1974	Haim Gouri	The 81st Blow	Nominated	Shared with Jacquot Ehrlich, and David Bergman.	
2012	Guy Davidi	5 Broken Cameras	Nominated	Shared with Emad Burnat.	
2012	Estelle Fialon; Philippa Kowarsky; Dror Moreh	The Gatekeepers	Nominated		
2015	Evgeny Afineevsky	Winter on Fire: Ukraine's Fight for Freedom	Nominated	Shared with Den Tolmor.	
2024	Rachel Szor; Yuval Abraham	No Other Land	Won	Shared with Basel Adra and Hamdan Ballal	

== Best Documentary Short Film ==
Year	Name	Film	Status	Milestone / Notes	Ref.
2015	Nomi Talisman	Last Day of Freedom	Nominated	Shared with Dee Hibbert-Jones.	
2025	Hilla Medalia	Children No More: "Were and Are Gone"	Nominated	Shared with Sheila Nevins.	

== Best Live Action Short ==
Year	Name	Film	Status	Milestone / Notes	Ref.
1974	Julian Chagrin	The Concert	Nominated		
1976	Julian Chagrin	The Morning Spider	Nominated		
2014	Oded Binnun; Mihal Brezis	Aya	Nominated		
2018	Guy Nattiv	Skin	Won		
2025	Meyer Levinson-Blount; Oron Caspi	Butcher's Stain	Nominated		

== Best Animated Short ==
Year	Name	Film	Status	Milestone / Notes	Ref.
2023	Tal Kantor; Amit R. Gicelter	Letter to a Pig	Nominated		

== Best Sound ==
Year	Name	Film	Status	Milestone / Notes
2013	Niv Adiri	Gravity	Won	Shared with Skip Lievsay, Christopher Benstead, and Chris Munro.
2021	Niv Adiri	Belfast	Nominated	Shared with Denise Yarde, Simon Chase, and James Mather.

== Best International Film ==
The following films were submitted by the country of Israel for Best International Feature Film and received a nomination.

Year (Ceremony)	English film title	Original title	Director	Status	Ref.
1964 (37th)	Sallah	Sallakh Shabati (סאלח שבתי)	Ephraim Kishon	Nominated	
1971 (44th)	The Policeman	Hashoter Azulai (השוטר אזולאי)	Ephraim Kishon	Nominated	
1972 (45th)	I Love You Rosa	Ani Ohev Otakh Rozah (אני אוהב אותך רוזה)	Moshé Mizrahi	Nominated	
1973 (46th)	The House on Chelouche Street	Habayit Birkhov Chelouche (הבית ברחוב שלוש)	Moshé Mizrahi	Nominated	
1977 (50th)	Operation Thunderbolt	Mivtza Yonatan (מבצע יונתן)	Menahem Golan	Nominated	
1984 (57th)	Beyond the Walls	Me'akhorei Hasoragim (מאחורי הסורגים)	Uri Barbash	Nominated	
2007 (80th)	Beaufort	Beaufort (בופור)	Joseph Cedar	Nominated	
2008 (81st)	Waltz with Bashir	Vals Im Bashir (ואלס עם באשיר)	Ari Folman	Nominated	
2009 (82nd)	Ajami	Agami (عجمي / עג'מי)	Scandar Copti and Yaron Shani	Nominated	
2011 (84th)	Footnote	He'arat Shulayyim (הערת שוליים)	Joseph Cedar	Nominated	

== Nominations and Winners ==
No. of wins	No. of nominations
4	25
