= Kishon =

Kishon (Hebrew: קישון) may refer to:

== People ==
- Ephraim Kishon, (1924–2005) Israeli satirist: author, dramatist, screenwriter, film director
- Rafi Kishon, Israeli animal rights activist, son of Ephraim Kishon
- Sara Kishon (1931–2002), Israeli pianist, art collector, and the wife of Ephraim Kishon
- Yehezkiel Kishon (1933–2006), Israeli cardiologist
- Kishon Khan (born 1970), Bangladeshi-born British jazz pianist

== Other ==
- Kishon Interchange, a major junction, Haifa, Israel
- Kishon prison in Al-Jalama, Haifa, Israel
- Kishon Port, port in the Haifa Bay, Israel
- Kishon River, river in northern Israel
- 21010 Kishon (1988 PL2), a main-belt asteroid discovered on 1988
- Kishon Regional Council (1945–1980), Israel, merged into the Jezreel Valley Regional Council
