= Itzik Kol =

Itzik Kol איציק קול
- Born: January 12, 1932; Petah Tikva, Mandatory Palestine
- Died: July 8, 2007 (aged 75); Kfar Saba, Israel
- Other names: Itzhak Kol, Yitzhak Kol
- Occupations: producer, director

Itzik Kol (Hebrew: איציק קול; January 12, 1932 – July 8, 2007) was an Israeli television and film producer considered by many to be a pioneer and originator of Israeli cinema. He died following complications from pneumonia.

== Biography ==
Yitchak Kolker (later Itzik Kol) was born in Petach Tikva, Mandatory Palestine, the only child of Tova Rosset, a Polish immigrant, and Shalom Kolker, a Ukrainian immigrant who worked as a union organizer and fought for Palestinian-Israeli rights. As a child, Kol trained to be a classical violinist at the urging of his mother. Despite noticeable talent, his interests shifted to politics and socialism during his adolescence and young adulthood when he became a prominent leader in the Israeli youth movement, Hashomer Hatzair. He was one of the founders Kibbutz Nachshon. There he married Noemi Glass and officially changed his last name from Kolker to Kol. They had two children: Ayelet Kol Engelman (born 1953) and Shahar Kol (born 1956). Kol left Kibbutz Nachshon in 1960.

In 1982, he divorced Noemi and married his second wife, Hadassa Degani, in 1991. They adopted a daughter two years later, Gabriella Kol (born 1993). In 1991–1994, Kol lived in Mount Olympus, Los Angeles, California. In 2002, he divorced Hadassa and married his third wife, a Colombian interior designer, Sarita Shalev in 2004.

In the last three years of his life, he was involved in the production of herbal remedies for Attention Deficit Disorders (ADD), one of which he actively promoted in the media.

== Film and theater career ==
In 1960 coproduced the film, "They Were Ten" directed by Baruch Dinar. In 1960-1967 he was General Manager of the Cameri Theater in Tel Aviv. During this period the theater achieved national and international recognition, including invitations to perform in Paris, London and Montreal.

1967-1978 President of Herzliya Studios where he produced critically acclaimed TV shows, such as: "Lul" with Uri Zohar and Arik Einstein, "That is my secret" with Uri Zohar, "Nine square" with Tuvia Tzafir, "That's it" and "Play it" with Dudu Topaz, "Take it or leave it" with Dudo Dotan. All these shows were awarded the "David's Harp" awards, the Israeli equivalent of the "Emmy".

1978-1983 President of United Studios where he initiated and planned the merging of Herzliya Studios with Berke-Pathe-Humphries Studios into one company. Under his leadership the company became the industry leader in film and TV production in Israel as well as satellite broadcasting throughout the world.

1983-1991 President of G.G. Israel Studios where he devised and developed the foundation of the Neve Ilan Communications Center near Jerusalem. The complex includes vast stages and various other studios for film TV and video production.

In 1997, he made "Hachaverim Shel Barney" (החברים של ברני, "Barney's Friends"), an Israeli co-production based on Barney & Friends. Kol's daughter loved the character of the purple dinosaur, which inspired him to pursue the rights to produce an Israeli adaptation of the show. He approached Lyrick Studios in March 1996, but was initially turned down, told that he was only allowed to air a Hebrew dubbed version of the original series. He felt that "Hebrew words into American songs and American kids' mouths" wouldn't work. Realizing that Sheryl Leach and her father-in-law, Richard Leach, were devout Christians, he asked "Why not have Barney speak in the language of the Bible?" This sealed the deal and, under strict guidelines, the show could be produced. One of these guidelines was that the episodes could only be adapted from those of the American show, with very few script changes. When the agreement went through, the show cost Roll Communications $41,000 per episode to produce (Only $500 per episode went to Lyrick), making it one of the most expensive children's shows produced in Israel. Israeli songwriter and translator Ehud Manor was brought on board to translate the songs, while his daughter Libby translated the show's scripts. Hachaverim Shel Barney premiered on November 2, 1997, and was immediately a smash hit.

Kol supervised and executed live satellite broadcasts from Israel (1973–1983) and directed the following live shows: Face The Nation (CBS) Meet The Press (NBC) Issues and Answers (ABC)

== Awards and honors ==
- 1971: Academy Awards: Best Foreign Language Film - nomination: The Policemen
- 1971: Golden Globes: Best Foreign Language Film - winner: The Policemen
- 1972: Monte-Carlo Television Festival: Prix Cino Del Duca - winner: The Policemen
- 1975: Academy Awards: Best Foreign Language Film - nomination: I Love You Rosa

Kol was an honorary member of the Academy of Motion Picture Arts & Sciences.

== Selected filmography ==
- The Policeman, (1971)
- Peeping Toms,
- Big Eyes (1974)
- I Love You Rosa(1975)
- Save the Lifeguard (1977)
- The Fox in the Chicken Coop (1978)
- Dead End Street (1982)
- The Ambassador (1984)
- Lemon Popsicle VI (1985)
- America 3000 (1986)
- Appointment With Death (1988)
- Rambo III (1988)
- A Man Called Sarge (1990)
- Not Without My Daughter (1991)
- Hachaverim Shel Barney (1997)

== Influence ==
Many Israeli actors, directors, and producers have praised Itzik Kol and cited both his work and persona as being influential in their own careers: Avi Nesher, a producer and one of Israel's leading directors (Halehaka, Dizengoff 99, Shovrim, Sof Haolam Smola) said about Itzik Kol: "I remember him as having a sharp sense of humor; he was a funny man with a great love of film and of culture. I owe Itzik a lot for my career. Without his confidence in me as a young producer in the movie Halehaka, none of my later doings would not have happened. I was a young, frightened 24-year-old director, and he was the executive director of Herzliya Studios, who produced many of Uri Zohar's films and TV shows. Today, being a producer myself, I can say that his decision to work with a young director such as myself was very courageous. Undoubtedly he is the one who made the film possible. His contribution in this respect was huge."

At a memorial evening for Itzik Kol held at the Tel Aviv Cinematheque in August 2008, Nesher stated that many contemporary Israeli films that have won international awards would not have been possible without Kol's contributions to the industry. Nesher also described Kol as deeply involved in all aspects of production, from casting and directing to attending to the cast's needs and reviewing editing details.

“Prass Israel” winner, actress and director Gila Almagor (Sallah Shabati, Hachayim al pi Agfa, Hakayitz shel Avia, Spielberg's Munich), who hosted Itzik Kol's memorial evening and worked with him since his days as general manager of the Cameri Theater, said at the occasion that aside for Kol's huge contribution to Israeli culture, he will be remembered for his unique persona. She described him as being a true friend who cares about people he works with, and as having a special sense of wit and humor.

"Kol was a great man, literally and figuratively, in girth and in spirit” said producer Shlomo Paz, who first met Itzik Kol when they both belonged to Hashomer Hatzair youth movement. “He knew how to take things and do them. He had daring; he had incredible reserves of energy, but mostly he was smart and did the right things." "There is no part of the industry he didn't touch. He made films and television shows, worked with the greatest artists and even helped found international commercial television station during the 1970s and 1980s."

Television host and actor Dudu Topaz describes Kol as his mentor and his spiritual father: “He was the first to give me a chance as a TV host on the show Sachek Ota, which brought us winning the Kinor David prize. He was the one to give Uri Zohar, Tuvia Tafir, myself and many others first chance in show biz. Along the years we have done many TV hit shows together such as Sachek Ota, Tze Mize, Ze Ma Yesh and Ten Kav. He was one of a kind!”

Producer and television host Meni Peer who worked with Kol both in Israeli Television's Arutz 1 and Arutz 2, on shows like Mimeni Meni, Besha’a Tova and Siba LeMesiba said: “The word producer is too dull to describe Itzik Kol's doings. He was the real creator of cinema and television in Israel. He was always involved with every aspect of the production. This man just knew and loved the stage!”.
