= Chaim Topol =

Israeli actor (1935–2023)

- חיים טופול
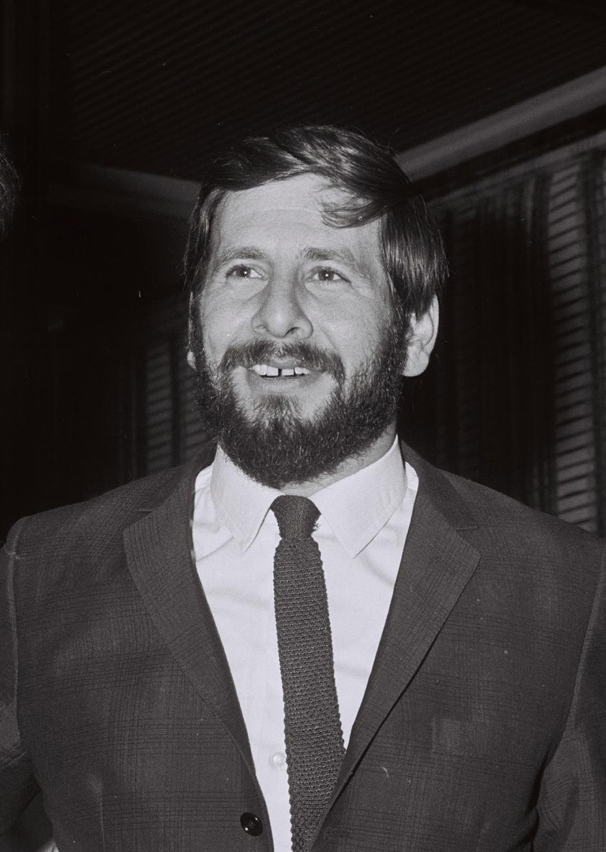
- Topol in 1967
- Born: 9 September 1935; Tel Aviv, Mandatory Palestine
- Died: 8 March 2023 (aged 87); Tel Aviv, Israel
- Other names: Haym Topol; Topol
- Occupations: Actor; singer
- Years active: 1957–2015
- Notable work: Tevye in Fiddler on the Roof (1971); Milos Columbo in For Your Eyes Only (1981)
- Spouse: Galia Finkelstein (m. 1956)
- Children: Anat; Omer; Adi
- Relatives: Yali Topol Margalith (granddaughter)
- Awards: Kinor David (1964); Golden Globe for Most Promising Newcomer—Male (1964); Golden Globe for Best Actor (1971); Israel Prize (2015)

Chaim Topol (Hebrew: חיים טופול; 9 September 1935 – 8 March 2023), mononymously known as Topol, was an Israeli actor and singer who portrayed Tevye, the lead character in the stage musical Fiddler on the Roof. Topol estimated that he played Tevye more than 3,500 times on stage from 1967 through 2009, and he also portrayed the character in the 1971 film adaptation of the play.

Topol began acting during his Israeli army service as a member of the Nahal entertainment troupe. He later toured Israel with kibbutz theatre and satirical theatre companies. He was a co-founder of the Haifa Theatre. His breakthrough film role came in 1964 as the title character in Sallah Shabati, by Israeli writer Ephraim Kishon, for which he won a Golden Globe for Most Promising Newcomer—Male. Topol went on to appear in more than 30 films in Israel and the United States, including Galileo (1975), Flash Gordon (1980), and the James Bond film For Your Eyes Only (1981). He was described as Israel's only internationally recognized entertainer from the 1960s through the 1980s. He won a Golden Globe for Best Actor and was nominated for an Academy Award for Best Actor for his 1971 film portrayal of Tevye, and was nominated for a Tony Award for Best Actor for a 1991 Broadway revival of Fiddler on the Roof.

Topol was a founder of Variety Israel, an organization serving children with disabilities, and Jordan River Village, a year-round camp for Arab and Jewish children with life-threatening illnesses, for which he served as chairman of the board. In 2015 he was awarded the Israel Prize for lifetime achievement.

In October 2026 the documentary Topol: On Top of the World, directed by Alon Gur Arye and produced by Ofer Naim, premiered at the 42nd Haifa International Film Festival. Through the combination of interviews with him, his wife Galia, family members, colleagues and friends, and archival footage, the film portrays crucial decisions which led to successes and to passed up roles, which influenced his career. The film presents his charisma as well as his complexity.

== Biography ==
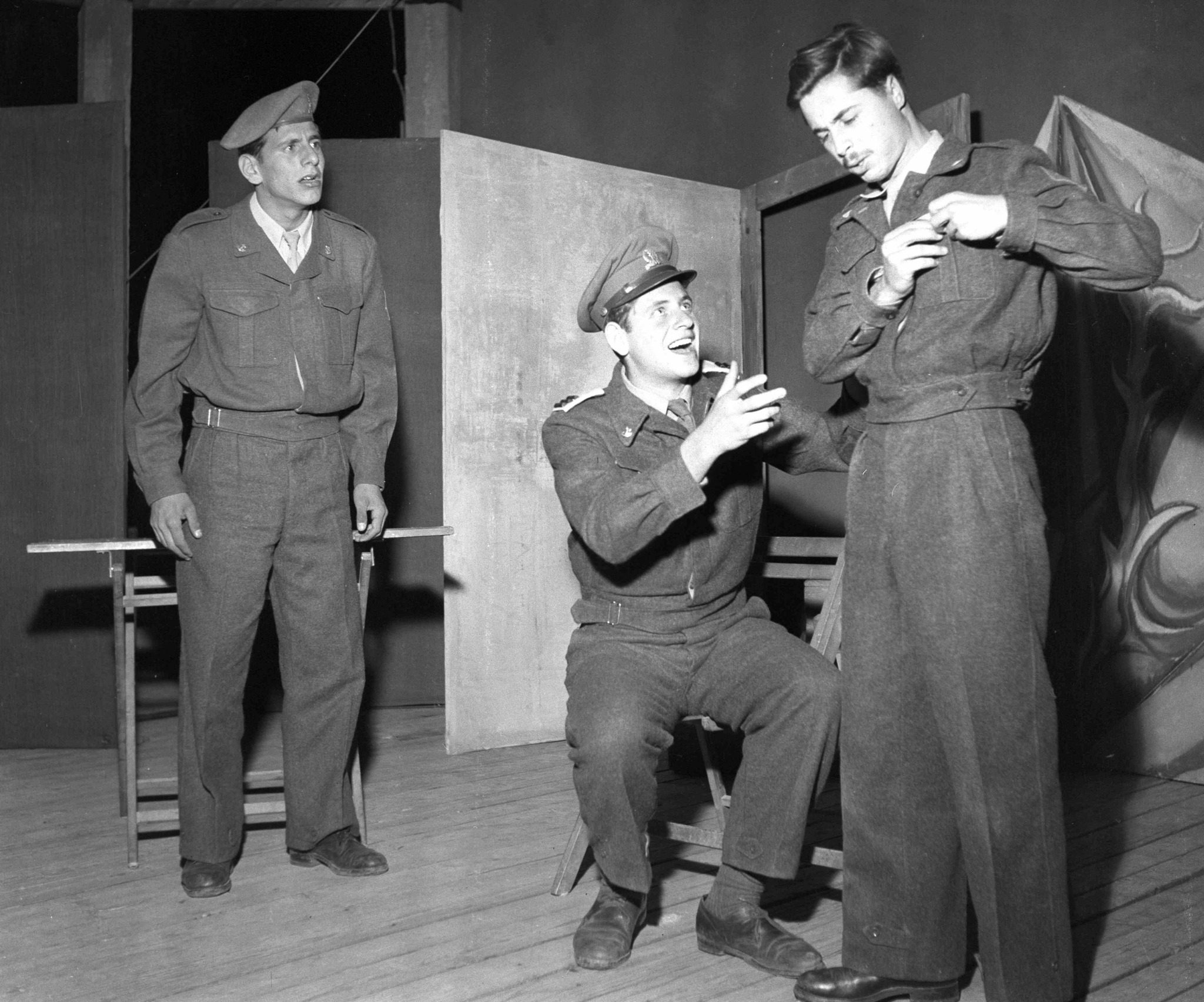
Chaim Topol (left) during his service in Lehakat HaNahal.

Chaim Topol was born on September 9, 1935, in Tel Aviv, in what was then Mandatory Palestine. His father Jacob Topol was born in Russia and in the early 1930s immigrated to Palestine, where he worked as a plasterer; he also served in the Haganah paramilitary organization. His mother Imrela "Rel" (née Goldman) Topol was a seamstress.

Topol's parents had been members of the Betar Zionist youth movement in Warsaw. His father had Hasidic roots, with a mother coming from a family of Gerrer Hasidim and a father from Aleksander Hasidim.

Topol and his two younger sisters grew up in the South Tel Aviv working-class neighborhood of Florentin. As a young child, although he wanted to become a commercial artist, his elementary school teacher, the writer Yemima Avidar-Tchernovitz, saw a theatrical side to him, and encouraged him to act in school plays and read stories to the class.

At age 14, he began working as a printer at Davar newspaper while pursuing his high-school studies at night. He graduated at age 17 and moved to Kibbutz Geva. A year later, he enlisted in the Israeli army and became a member of the Nahal entertainment troupe, singing and acting in traveling shows. He rose in rank to troupe commander.

Twenty-three days after being discharged from military service on October 2, 1956, and two days after marrying Galia Finkelstein, a fellow Nahal troupe member, Topol was called up for reserve duty in the Sinai Campaign. He performed for soldiers stationed in the desert.

After the war, he and his wife settled in Kibbutz Mishmar David, where Topol worked as a garage mechanic. Topol assembled a kibbutz theatre company made up of friends from his Nahal troupe; the group toured four days a week, worked on their respective kibbutzim for two days a week, and had one day off. The theatre company was in existence from early 1957 to the mid-1960s. Topol both sang and acted with the group, doing both "loudly".

Topol and his wife Galia Finkelstein had three children: a son, Omer, and two daughters, Anat and Adi. The couple resided in Galia's childhood home in Tel Aviv. Topol's hobbies included sketching and sculpting. Through Adi, his granddaughter Yali Topol Margalith is an actress.

In June 2022, Topol's son, Omer, revealed that his father was suffering from Alzheimer's disease.

On March 8, 2023, Topol's family notified the press that he was near death and "living his final hours", and asked the public to respect the family's privacy. He died overnight at the age of 87. The day before his burial at Kvutzat Shiller on March 10, a memorial was held at the Cameri Theater in Tel Aviv.

== Singing and acting career ==
Between 1960 and 1964, Topol performed with the Batzal Yarok ("Green Onion") satirical theatre company, which also toured Israel. Other members of the group included Uri Zohar, Nechama Hendel, Zaharira Harifai, Arik Einstein, and Oded Kotler. In 1960, Topol co-founded the Haifa Municipal Theatre with Yosef Milo, serving as assistant to the director and acting in plays by Shakespeare, Ionesco, and Brecht. In 1965 he performed in the Cameri Theatre in Tel Aviv.

Haim Topol, then a young man and of Ashkenazi heritage, plays the old Sephardic manipulator with such consummate skill that even aged immigrants from Morocco and Tunisia were convinced that he was one of them.

— Tom Tugend on Topol's portrayal of Sallah Shabati

Topol's first film appearance was in the 1961 film I Like Mike, followed by the 1963 Israeli film El Dorado. His breakthrough role came as the lead character in the 1964 film Sallah Shabati. Adapted for the screen by Ephraim Kishon from his original play, the social satire depicts the hardships of a Sephardic immigrant family in the rough conditions of ma'abarot, immigrant absorption camps in Israel in the 1950s, satirizing "just about every pillar of Israeli society: the Ashkenazi establishment, the pedantic bureaucracy, corrupt political parties, rigid kibbutz ideologues and ... the Jewish National Fund's tree-planting program". Topol, who was 29 during the filming, was familiar playing the role of the family patriarch, having performed skits from the play with his Nahal entertainment troupe during his army years. He contributed his ideas to the part, playing the character as a more universal Mizrahi Jew instead of specifically a Yemenite, Iraqi, or Moroccan Jew, and asking Kishon to change the character's first name from Saadia (a recognizably Yemenite name) to Sallah (a more general Mizrahi name).

The film won the Golden Globe Award for Best Foreign Language Film, and Topol won the 1964 Golden Gate Award for Best Actor at the San Francisco International Film Festival and the 1965 Golden Globe for Most Promising Newcomer—Male, alongside Harve Presnell and George Segal. Sallah Shabati was nominated for the Academy Award for Best Foreign Language Film, losing to the Italian-language Yesterday, Today and Tomorrow.

In 1966, Topol made his English-language film debut as Abou Ibn Kaqden in the Mickey Marcus biopic Cast a Giant Shadow.

=== Tevye the Dairyman ===
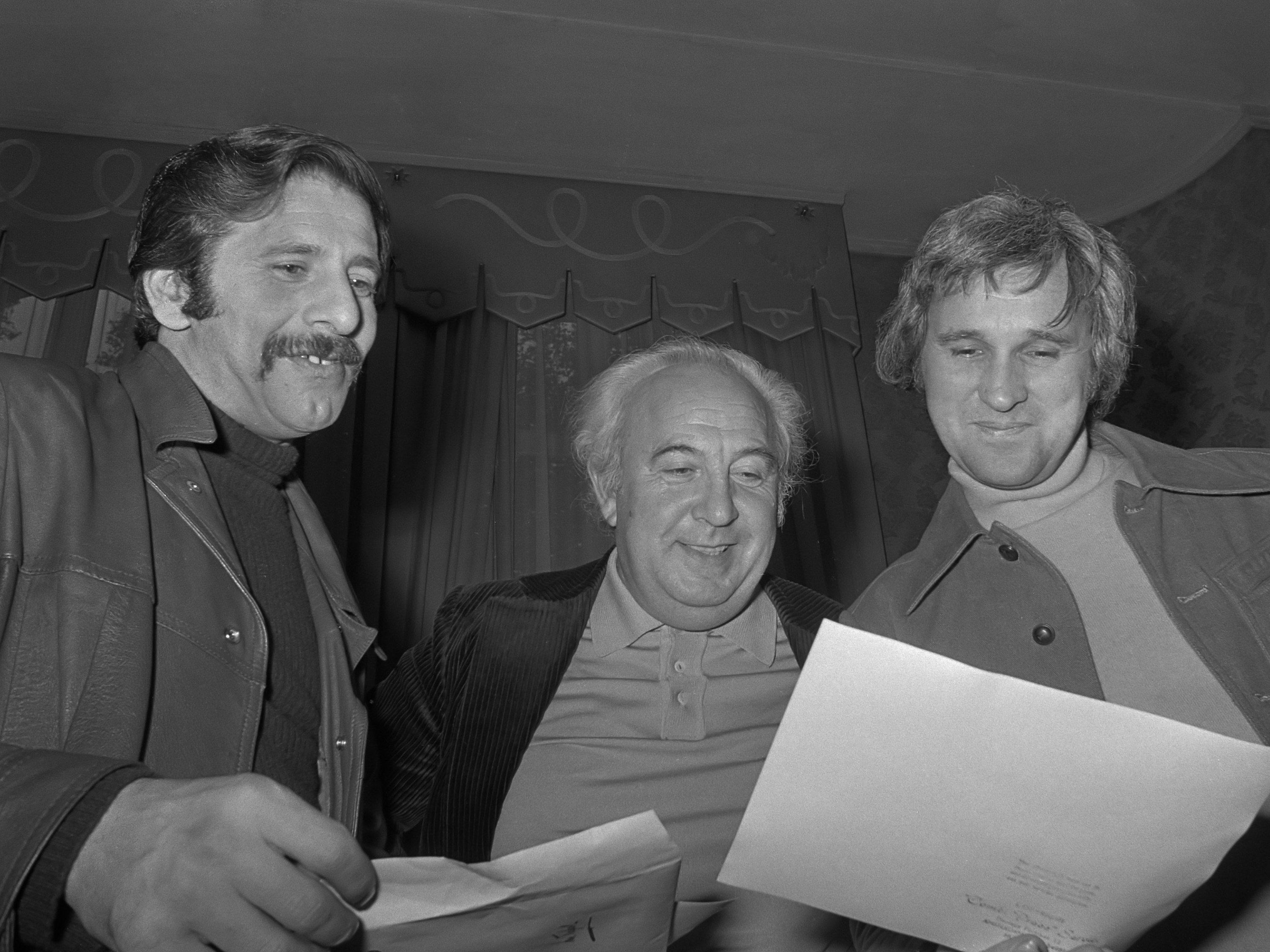
Topol in 1971

Topol came to greatest prominence in his portrayal of Tevye the Dairyman on stage and screen. He first played the lead role in the Israeli production of the musical Fiddler on the Roof in 1966, replacing Shmuel Rodensky for 10 weeks when Rodensky fell ill. Harold Prince, producer of the original Fiddler on the Roof that opened on Broadway in 1964, had seen Topol in Sallah Shabati and called him to audition for the role of the fifty-something Tevye in a new production scheduled to open at Her Majesty's Theatre in London on February 16, 1967. Not yet fluent in English, Topol memorized the score from listening to the original Broadway cast album and practiced the lyrics with a British native.

When Topol arrived at the audition, Prince was surprised that this 30-year-old man had played Shabati, a character in his sixties. Topol explained, "A good actor can play an old man, a sad face, a happy man. Makeup is not an obstacle". Topol also surprised the producers with his familiarity with the staging, since he had already acted in the Israeli production, and was hired. He spent six months in London learning his part phonetically with vocal coach Cicely Berry. Jerome Robbins, director and choreographer of the 1964 Broadway show who came over to direct the London production, "re-directed" the character of Tevye for Topol and helped the actor deliver a less caricatured performance. Topol's performance received positive reviews.

A few months after the opening, Topol was called up for reserve duty in the Six-Day War and returned to Israel. He was assigned to an army entertainment troupe on the Golan Heights. Afterward he returned to the London production, appearing in a total of 430 performances.

It was during the London run that he began being known by his last name only, as the English producers were unable to pronounce the voiceless uvular fricative consonant Ḥet at the beginning of his first name, Chaim, instead calling him "Shame".

Chaim Topol breathed life into Tevye.

— Norman Jewison, 2011

In casting the 1971 film version of Fiddler on the Roof, director Norman Jewison and his production team sought an actor other than Zero Mostel for the lead role. This decision was somewhat controversial, as Mostel had made the role famous in the long-running Broadway musical and was expected to star in the film. But Jewison and his team felt Mostel's flamboyant personalty, while suitable for the stage, would eclipse the character in a screen performance. In February 1968, Jewison flew to London to see Topol perform as Tevye during his last week with the London production, and chose him over Danny Kaye, Herschel Bernardi, Rod Steiger, Danny Thomas, Walter Matthau, Richard Burton, and Frank Sinatra, all of whom had also expressed interest in the part.

Topol, then aged 36, was made to look 20 years older and 30 pounds (14 kg) heavier with makeup and costuming. As in his role as Shabati, Topol used the technique of "locking his muscles" to convincingly play an older character. He later explained:

As a young man, I had to make sure that I didn't break the illusion for the audience. You have to tame yourself. I'm now someone who is supposed to be 50, 60 years old. I cannot jump. I cannot suddenly be young. You produce a certain sound [in your voice] that is not young.

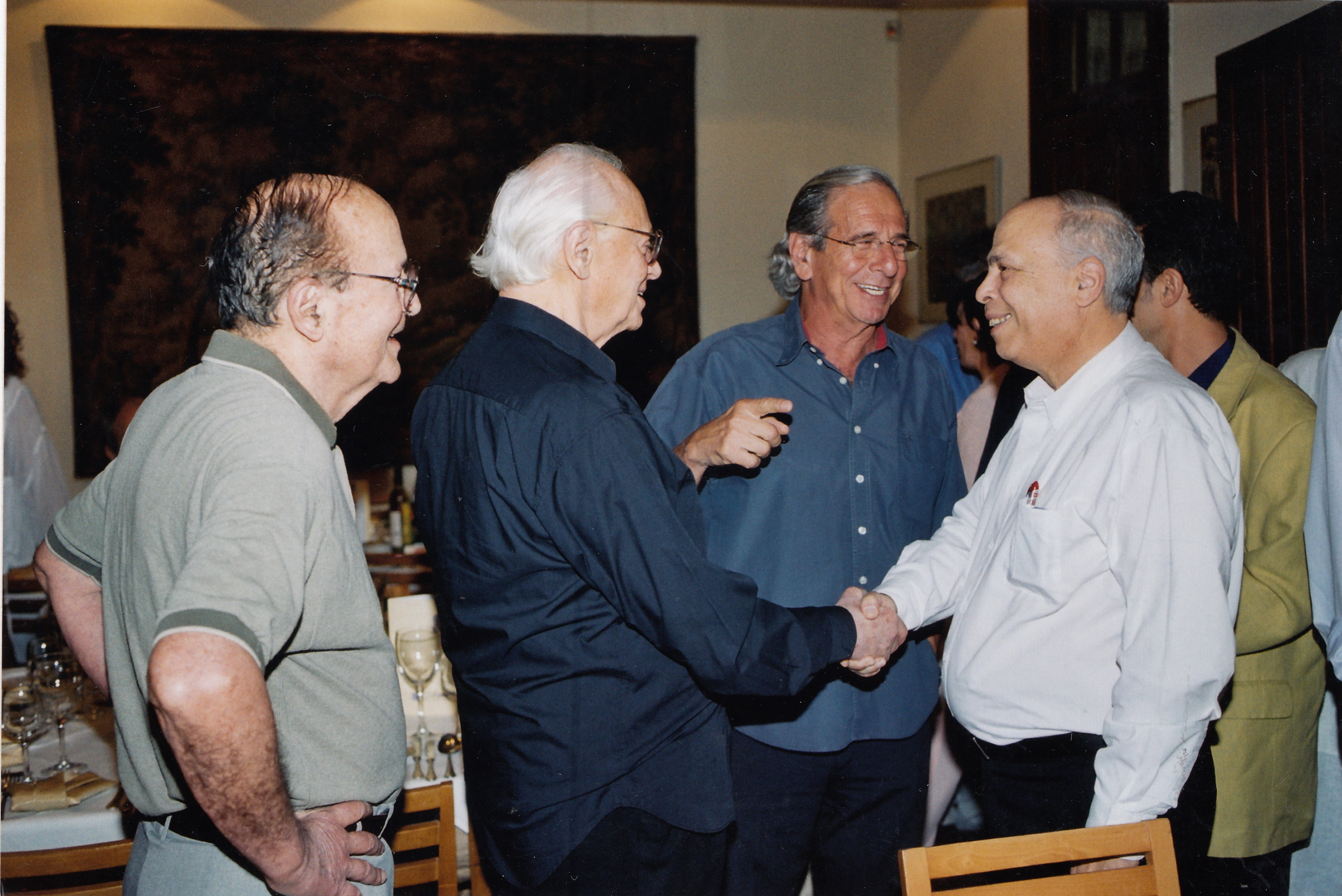
Topol in 2003

For his performance, Topol won the Golden Globe Award for Best Actor in a Motion Picture – Musical or Comedy, the Sant Jordi Award for Best Performance in a Foreign Film, and the 1972 David di Donatello for Best Foreign Actor, sharing the latter with Elizabeth Taylor. He was also nominated for the 1971 Academy Award for Best Actor, losing to Gene Hackman in The French Connection.

In 1983, Topol reprised the role of Tevye in a revival of Fiddler on the Roof on the West End in London. In 1989, he played the role in a 30-city U.S. touring production. As he was by then the approximate age of the character, he commented, "I didn't have to spend the energy playing the age". In 1990–1991, he again starred as Tevye in a Broadway revival of Fiddler at the Gershwin Theatre. In that production Rosalind Harris, who had played eldest daughter Tzeitel in the film, played Tevye's wife Golde opposite Topol. In 1991, Topol was nominated for a Tony Award for Best Performance by a Leading Actor in a Musical, losing to Jonathan Pryce in Miss Saigon. Topol again played Tevye in a 1994 London revival, which became a touring production. In that production, the role of one of his daughters was played by his own daughter, Adi Topol Margalith.

Topol reprised the role of Tevye for a 1997–1998 touring production in Israel, as well as a 1998 show at the Regent Theatre in Melbourne. In September 2005 he returned to Australia for a Fiddler on the Roof revival at the Capitol Theatre in Sydney, followed by an April 2006 production at the Lyric Theatre in Brisbane, and a June 2006 production at Her Majesty's Theatre in Melbourne. In May 2007, he starred in a production at the Auckland Civic Theatre.

In 2009, Topol began a farewell tour of Fiddler on the Roof as Tevye, opening in Wilmington, Delaware. He was forced to withdraw from the tour in Boston owing to a shoulder injury, and was replaced by Theodore Bikel and Harvey Fierstein, both of whom had portrayed Tevye on Broadway. Topol estimated that he performed the role more than 3,500 times.

In 2014, he appeared in Raising the Roof, a 50th-anniversary tribute to Fiddler at New York City's Town Hall produced by National Yiddish Theatre. The evening featured Chita Rivera, Joshua Bell, Sheldon Harnick, Andrea Martin, Jerry Zaks, and more, and was co-directed by Gary John La Rosa and Erik Liberman.

=== Other stage and film roles ===
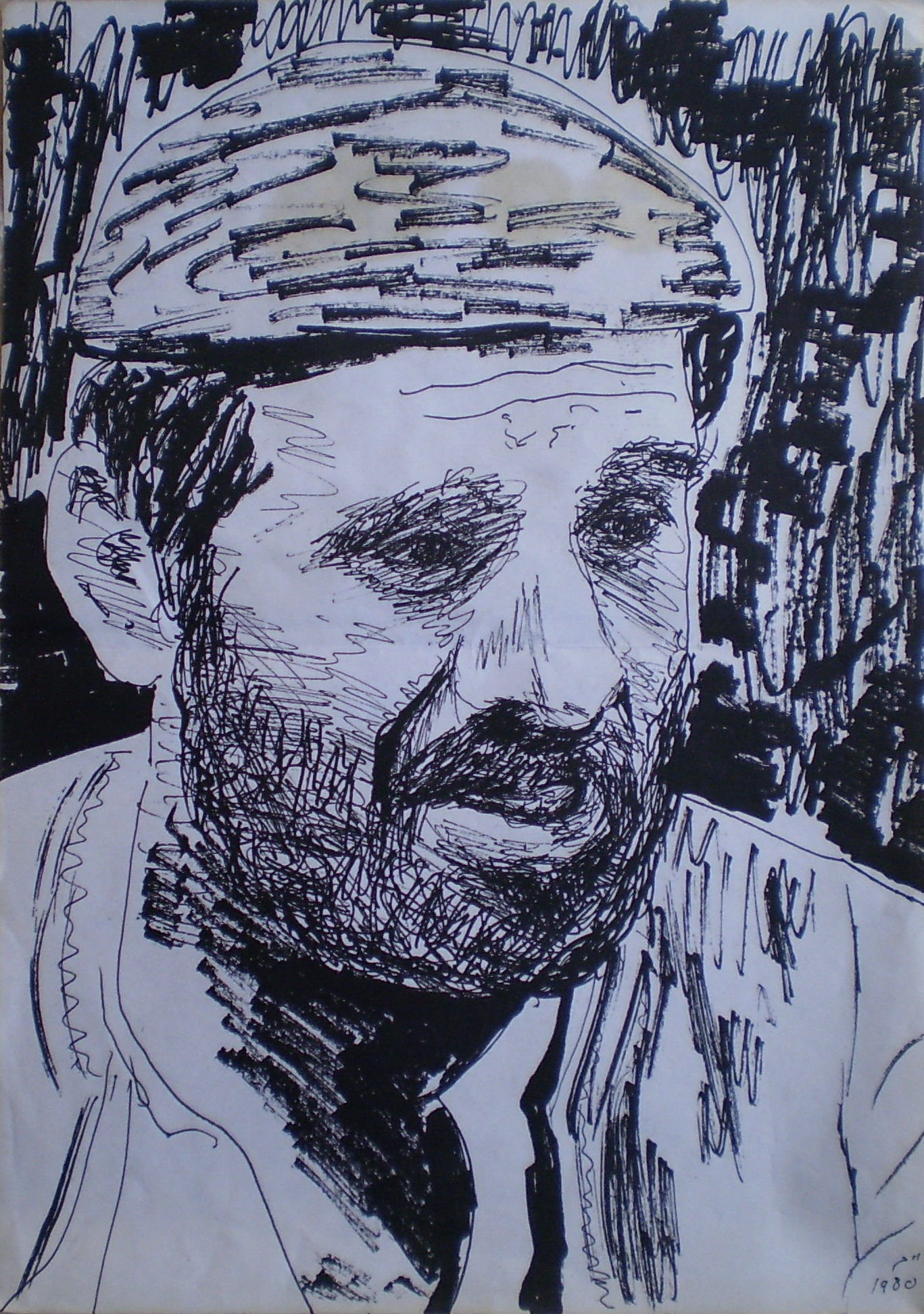
Topol's sketch of himself as Sallah Shabati

In 1976, Topol played the lead role of the baker, Amiable, in the new musical The Baker's Wife, but was fired after eight months by producer David Merrick. In her autobiography, Patti LuPone, his co-star in the production, claimed that Topol had behaved unprofessionally on stage and had a strained relationship with her off-stage. The show's composer, Stephen Schwartz, claimed that Topol's behavior greatly disturbed the cast and directors and resulted in the production not reaching Broadway as planned. In 1988, Topol starred in the title role in Ziegfeld at the London Palladium. He returned to the London stage in 2008 in the role of Honoré, played by Maurice Chevalier in the 1958 film Gigi.

Topol appeared in more than 30 films in Israel and abroad. Among his notable English-language appearances are the title role in Galileo (1975), Dr. Hans Zarkov in Flash Gordon (1980), and Milos Columbo in the James Bond film For Your Eyes Only (1981). He was said to be Israel's "only internationally recognized entertainer" from the 1960s through to the 1980s.

In Israel, Topol acted in and produced dozens of films and television series. As a voice artist, he dubbed the voice of Bagheera in the Hebrew-language versions of The Jungle Book and the 2003 sequel as well as Rubeus Hagrid in the first two films of the Harry Potter film series. He was also a playwright and screenwriter.

Topol was featured on two BBC One programmes, the six-part series Topol's Israel (1985) and earlier It's Topol (1968). A Hebrew-language documentary of his life, Chaim Topol – Life as a Film, aired on Israel's Channel 1 in 2011, featuring interviews with his longtime actor friends in Israel and abroad.

=== Musical recordings ===
A baritone, Topol recorded several singles and albums, including film soundtracks, children's songs, and Israeli war songs. His albums include Topol With Roger Webb And His Orchestra - Topol '68 (1967), Topol Sings Israeli Freedom Songs (1967), War Songs By Topol (1968), and Topol's Israel (1984). He appeared on the soundtrack album for the film production of Fiddler on the Roof (1971) and the London cast album (1967).

== Mossad missions ==
After Topol's death, the family revealed that he had been involved in Mossad missions in the 1960s and 1970s. They said that he went on unexplained trips abroad while equipped with a miniature state-of-the-art camera and tape recorder, and that he was in regular contact with Mossad officer Peter Malkin, who came on visits to the family home through the backyard in disguise. On several occasions, Topol carried out wiretapping and other operations with Malkin, using his international acclaim to divert attention from Malkin.

== Literary and art career ==
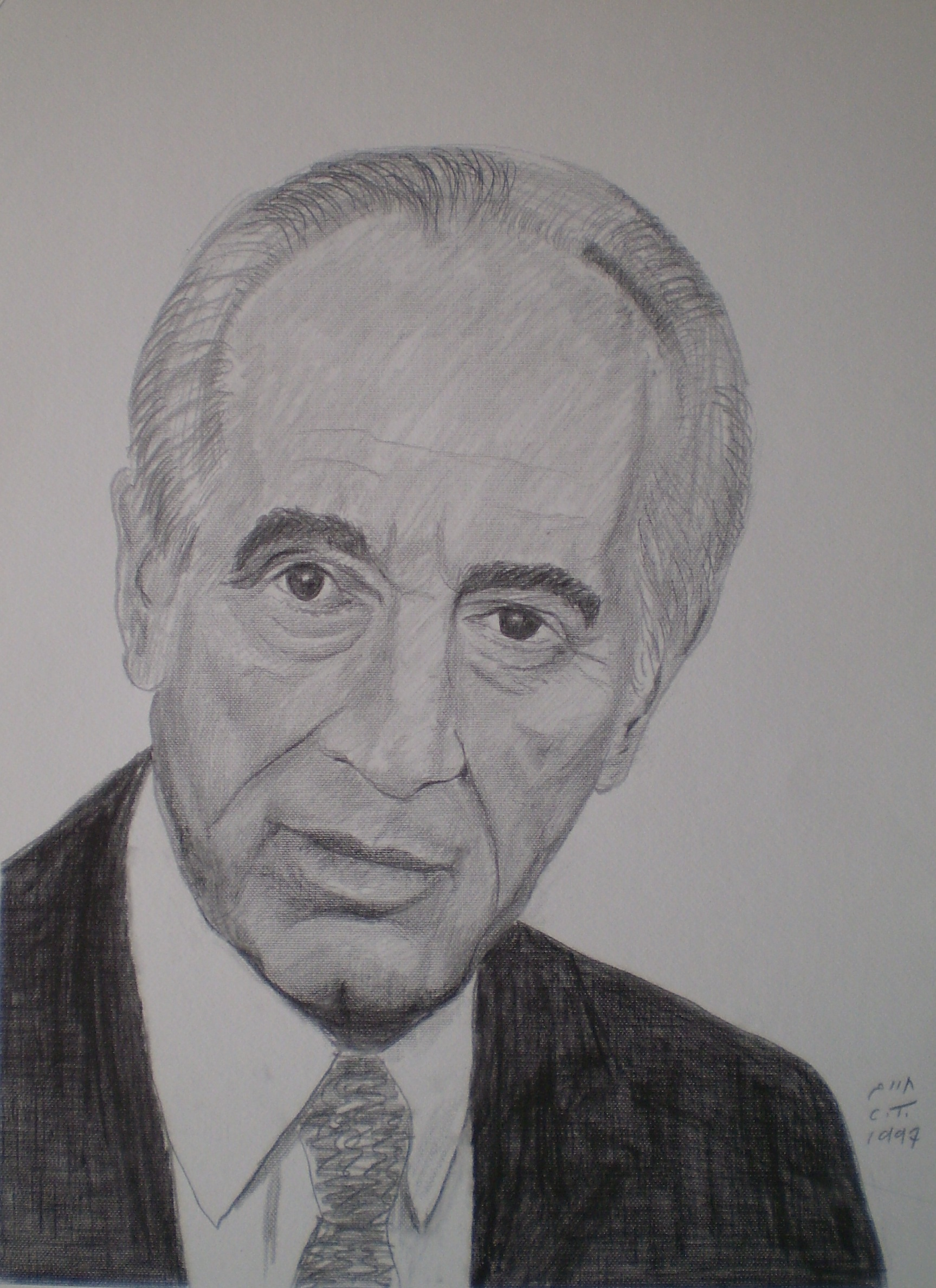
Shimon Peres by Topol

His autobiography, Topol by Topol, was published in London by Weindenfel and Nicholson (1981). He also authored To Life! (1994) and Topol's Treasury of Jewish Humor, Wit and Wisdom (1995).

Topol illustrated approximately 25 books in both Hebrew and English. He also produced drawings of Israeli national figures. His sketches of Israeli presidents were reproduced in a 2013 stamp series issued by the Israel Philatelic Federation, as was his self-portrait as Tevye for 2014 commemorative stamp marking the 50th anniversary of the Broadway debut of Fiddler on the Roof.

== Philanthropy ==
In 1967, Topol founded Variety Israel, an organization serving children with disabilities. He was also a co-founder and chairman of the board of Jordan River Village, a vacation village for Arab and Jewish children with life-threatening illnesses, which opened in 2012. It was inspired by Paul Newman's Hole in the Wall Gang Camp. The village is operated almost entirely by volunteers. Topol described it as the project he was "most connected to."

== Awards and recognition ==
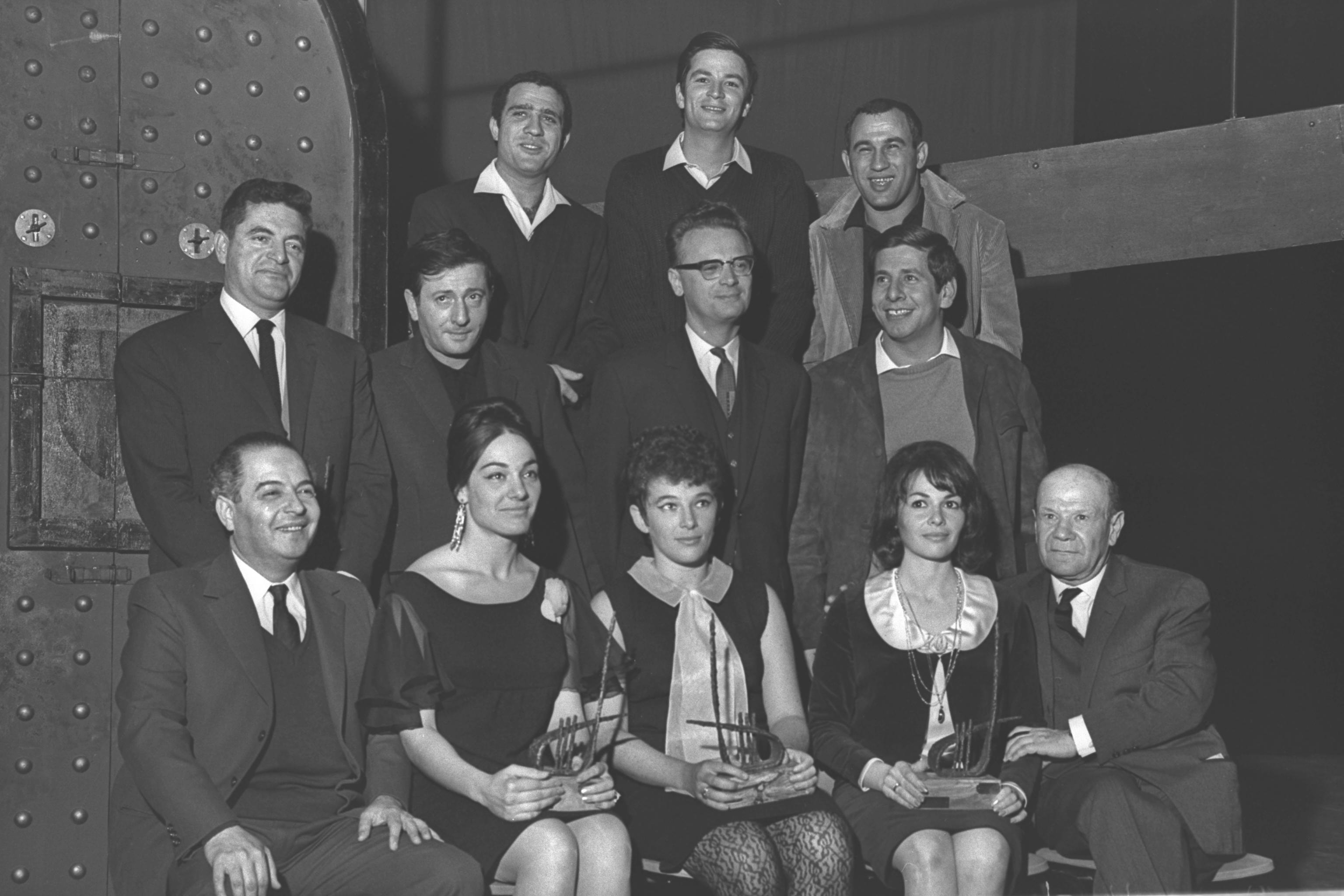
Topol (centre row, far right) and other winners of the Kinor David award in arts and entertainment, 1964

Topol was a recipient of Israel's Kinor David award in arts and entertainment in 1964. He received a Best Actor award from the San Sebastián International Film Festival for his performance in the 1972 film Follow Me! In 2008, he was named an Outstanding Member of the Israel Festival for his contribution to Israeli culture.

In 2014, the University of Haifa conferred upon Topol an honorary degree in recognition of his 50 years of activity in Israel's cultural and public life. In 2015, he received the Israel Prize for lifetime achievement.

In 2015, Chaim Topol was honoured by the Chief Rabbi of Ukraine, Rabbi Moshe Reuven Azman and the Ukrainian Jewish Community. Topol's portrayal of Tevye in Fiddler on the Roof led to the inspiration for the Anatevka Refugee Village which was named in commemoration of the fictional village.

== Legacy ==
Shortly after Topol's death, President Isaac Herzog issued a statement honouring "one of the most prominent Israeli stage artists, a gifted actor who conquered many stages in Israel and overseas, filled the cinema screens with his presence and, above all, deeply entered our hearts". Prime minister Benjamin Netanyahu stated "his wide smile, warm voice, and unique sense of humour made him a folk hero who won the hearts of the people" and former prime minister Yair Lapid remarked "He and his smile will continue to accompany Israeli culture, his rich legacy will forever remain a part of Israel".

== Filmography ==
Year	Title	Role	Notes
1961	I Like Mike	Mikha	
1962	Etz O Palestina (The True Story of Palestine)	Narrator	
1963	El Dorado	Benny Sherman	Credited as Haim Topol
1964	Sallah Shabati	Sallah Shabati	Credited as Haym Topol; Golden Globe Award for Most Promising Newcomer – Male; San Francisco International Film Festival Award for Best Actor
1966	Cast a Giant Shadow	Abou Ibn Kader	
1967	Ervinka	Ervinka	Credited as Haim Topol. Also co-producer
1968	Kol Mamzer Melekh (Every Bastard a King)		Co-producer
1968	Ha-Shehuna Shelanu (Fish, Football, and Girls)		Co-producer
1969	Before Winter Comes	Janovic	
1969	A Talent for Loving	General Molina	
1970	Nikki: Wild Dog of the North	Narrator	Hebrew dub
1971	Fiddler on the Roof	Tevye	David di Donatello Award for Best Foreign Actor; Golden Globe Award for Best Actor – Motion Picture Musical or Comedy; Sant Jordi Award for Best Performance in a Foreign Film; Nominated – Academy Award for Best Actor
1971	The Going Up of David Lev	Chaim	TV movie
1971	Hatarnegol (The Boys Will Never Believe It; The Rooster)	Gadi Zur	Also co-producer
1972	Follow Me!	Julian Cristoforou	San Sebastián International Film Festival award for Best Actor
1975	Galileo	Galileo Galilei	
1979	The House on Garibaldi Street	Michael	TV movie
1980	Flash Gordon	Dr. Hans Zarkov	
1981	For Your Eyes Only	Milos Columbo	
1983	The Winds of War	Berel Jastrow	TV miniseries
1985	Roman Behemshechim (Again, Forever)	Effi Avidar	
1987	Queenie	Dimitri Goldner	TV movie
1988	Tales of the Unexpected	Professor Max Kelada	Episode: Mr. Know-All
1988	The Jungle Book	Bagheera	Hebrew dub
1988–1989	War and Remembrance	Berel Jastrow	TV miniseries, 11 episodes
1993	SeaQuest DSV	Dr. Rafik Hassan	Episode: Treasure of the Mind
1998	Left Luggage	Mr. Apfelschnitt	
1998	Time Elevator	Shalem	
2000	Inside For Your Eyes Only		Documentary
2001	Fiddler on the Roof: 30 Years of Tradition		Documentary
2001	Harry Potter and the Philosopher's Stone	Rubeus Hagrid	Hebrew dub
2002	Harry Potter and the Chamber of Secrets	Rubeus Hagrid	Hebrew dub
2003	The Jungle Book 2	Bagheera	Hebrew dub
2019	Fiddler: A Miracle of Miracles		Documentary

== See also ==
- Cinema of Israel
- Culture of Israel
- Theater of Israel
- List of Israeli Academy Award winners and nominees
- List of Jewish Academy Award winners and nominees
- Mononymous person
