= Zaharira Harifai =

Israeli film, stage, and television actress (1929–2013)

- זהרירה חריפאי
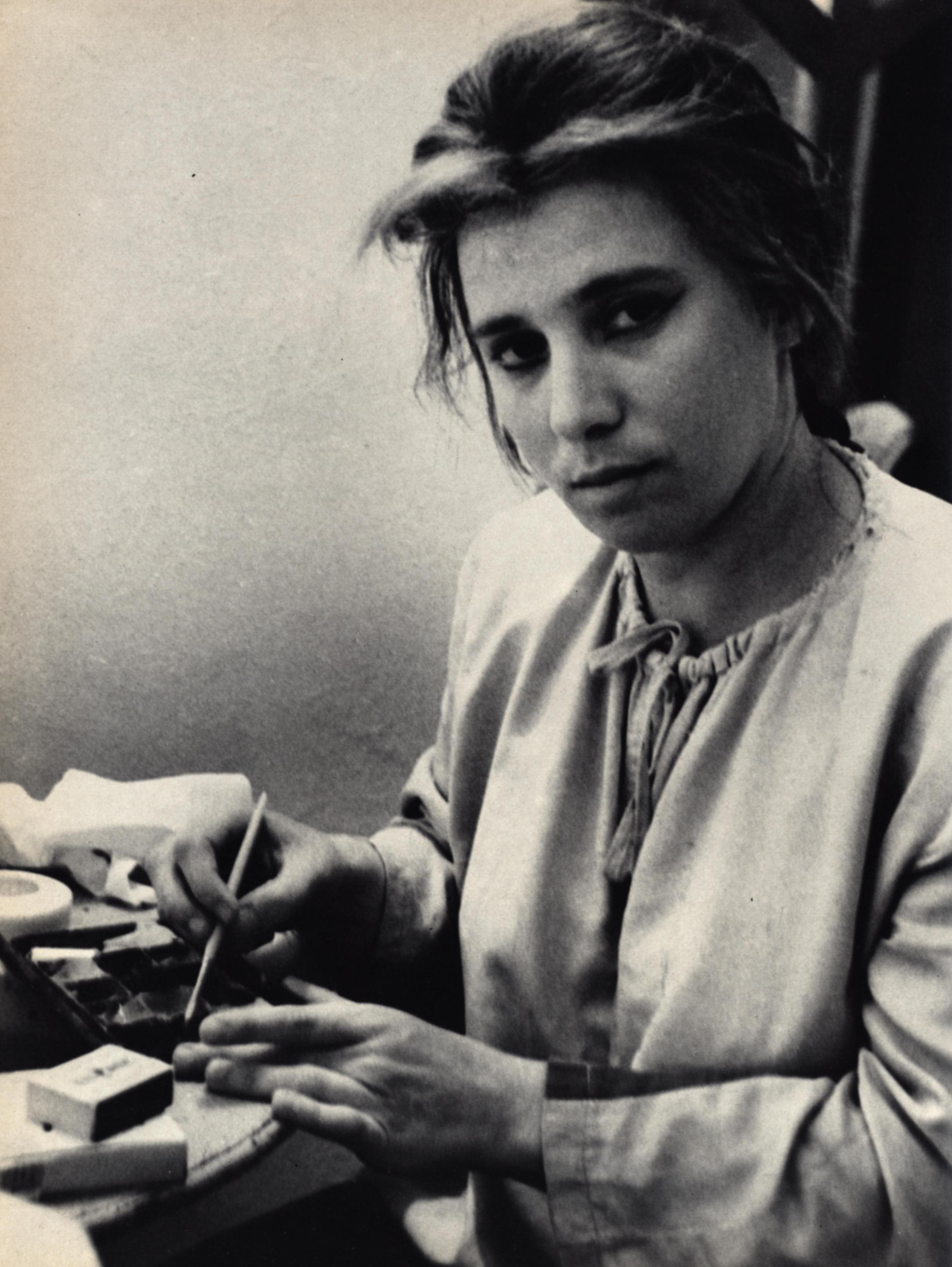
- Zaharira Harifai, 1960s
- Born: 12 December 1929; Tel Aviv, Mandatory Palestine
- Died: 2 January 2013 (aged 83); Tel Aviv, Israel
- Resting place: Kibbutz Givat HaShlosha cemetery
- Occupation: Actress
- Years active: 1968–2013
- Notable work: Happy End
- Spouse: Shlomo Shva
- Children: Aya Shva
- Awards: Israel Prize (2003); Best Actress in Theater (2011)

Zaharira Harifai (Hebrew: זהרירה חריפאי; December 12, 1929 – January 2, 2013) was an Israeli film, stage, and television actress, director, and stage artist.

She is a recipient of the Israel Prize in Theater, which she was awarded in 2003. The Jerusalem Post called her "one of Israel's most celebrated actresses."

== Biography ==
Harifai was born and raised in Tel Aviv. Her father, Haim Leib Harifai, was a Hebrew and literature teacher, journalist, and cultural activist in the Yishuv, who immigrated from Russia in 1922. In 1934, at the age of four, she was orphaned when her father died of pneumonia. Her mother, Hannah Dvora, worked in a kindergarten kitchen.

She attended the Mikveh Israel agricultural school for high school, where she excelled, among other things, in swimming. In 1946, after finishing high school, she trained at Kibbut Gvat in the framework of the Palmach Battalion. During the War of Independence, she served as a radio operator in the Golani Brigade.

== Career ==
After her military discharge, she appeared in the civilian program of the Chizbatron troupe (outside the military) and studied at the drama school attached to the Cameri Theatre. One of her teachers was Peter Frye, but Harifai considered herself primarily a student of Yosef Milo, the founder of the Cameri Theatre.

In the 1950s and 1960s, she performed in plays such as The Italian Straw Hat and As You Like It at the Cameri, and The Caucasian Chalk Circle and other productions at the Haifa Theatre.

In the late 1950s, she was a member of the Batzal Yarok (Green Onion) troupe, where she sang the solo "The Pioneer Prostitute," a provocative song that was banned from radio broadcast.

After being dismissed from the Cameri Theatre, primarily for reasons related to her physical appearance, in 1958 she played the lesbian character Inez in Jean-Paul Sartre's play No Exit as part of Zavit Theater, which she co-founded with other actors.

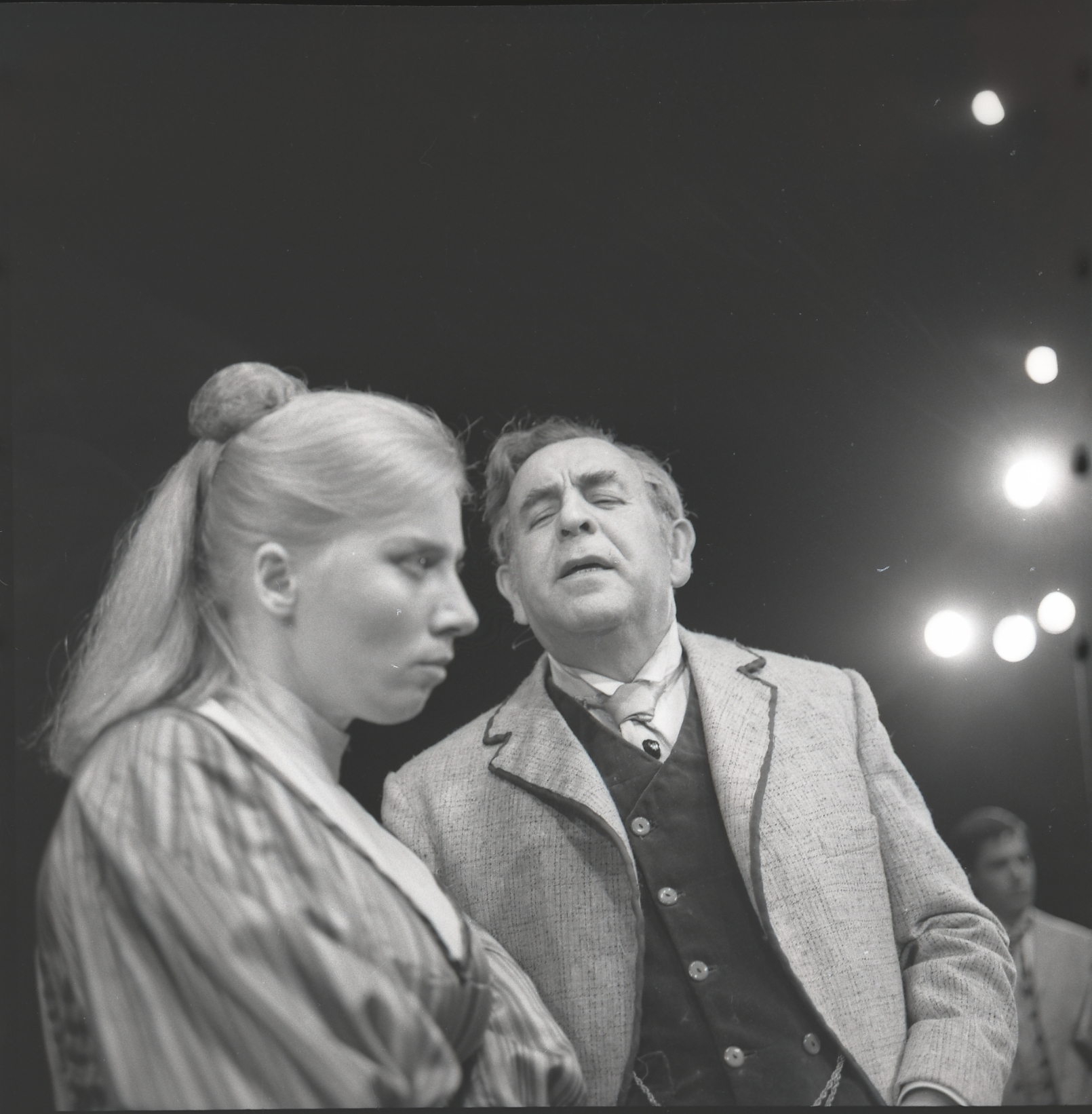
Harifai in rehearsals at Habima

In 1959, two women attempted to commit suicide by drowning in the Yarkon River. Harifai, who was an outstanding competitive swimmer for Hapoel Tel Aviv (100m breaststroke), stripped off her dress and jumped into the water to save them, but she only managed to rescue one.

In 1967, she created an evening of poetry readings called "Sealed Letters in the Book," and from then on specialized in poetry reading. She is considered among the pioneers of this art form in Israel.

=== The Cameri Theatre and Hanoch Levin ===
In 1968, Harifai rejoined the Cameri Theatre company and became one of its most prominent actors. She was known for her original acting style, which allowed her to stand out when portraying both supporting and leading roles. She gained particular fame for her roles in the plays of Hanoch Levin, including Rubber Merchants, Requiem, Ya'acobi and Leidental, and The Romantics. Other plays in which she starred included The Trojan Women and Mother Courage.

Between 2003 and 2010, she performed at the Beit Lessin Theatre in Neil Simon's Lost in Yonkers and other plays. She later performed at the Beersheba Theater and returned once again to the Cameri.

In 2003, Harifai was awarded the Israel Prize for Theater. She won the Best Actress in Theater award in 2011 for her role in the Anat Gov play, Happy End.

=== Film career ===
In 1963, she contributed her voice to the film The Cellar, directed by Natan Gross, based on a screenplay by and starring Shimon Yisraeli.

In 1964, she acted in the film Judith alongside Sophia Loren, which was filmed in Israel and released in 1966.

Harifai also acted in several Israeli films, including four directed by Ephraim Kishon: Sallah Shabati (1964), Blaumilch Canal (1969), The Policeman (1971), and The Fox in the Chicken Coop (1978).

Additionally, Harifai appeared in films such as Hole in the Moon (1965), Sabina and the Men (1966), The Pill (1972), Abu El Banat (1973), Hamesh Hamesh (1980), and Diving Deep (1982). In 2007, she starred in the film Jellyfish by Etgar Keret and Shira Geffen, which won the Caméra d'Or at the Cannes Film Festival.

=== Directing and later career ===
In 1985, she released an album titled To Sing Theatre, featuring 10 songs from various plays.

In the 1990s, she also began to direct for the Library Theater and the Beit Zvi School of the Performing Arts in Ramat Gan, where she also taught acting. Among the plays she directed wereYa'acobi and Leidental (in which her daughter, Aya Sheba, performed), Yerma starring Shiri Golan, and The Master Builder starring Yoram Hatab. Subsequently, she directed the play Shards at the Acco Festival of Alternative Israeli Theatre and Dvora Baron by Yehudit Katzir at the Cameri Theatre.

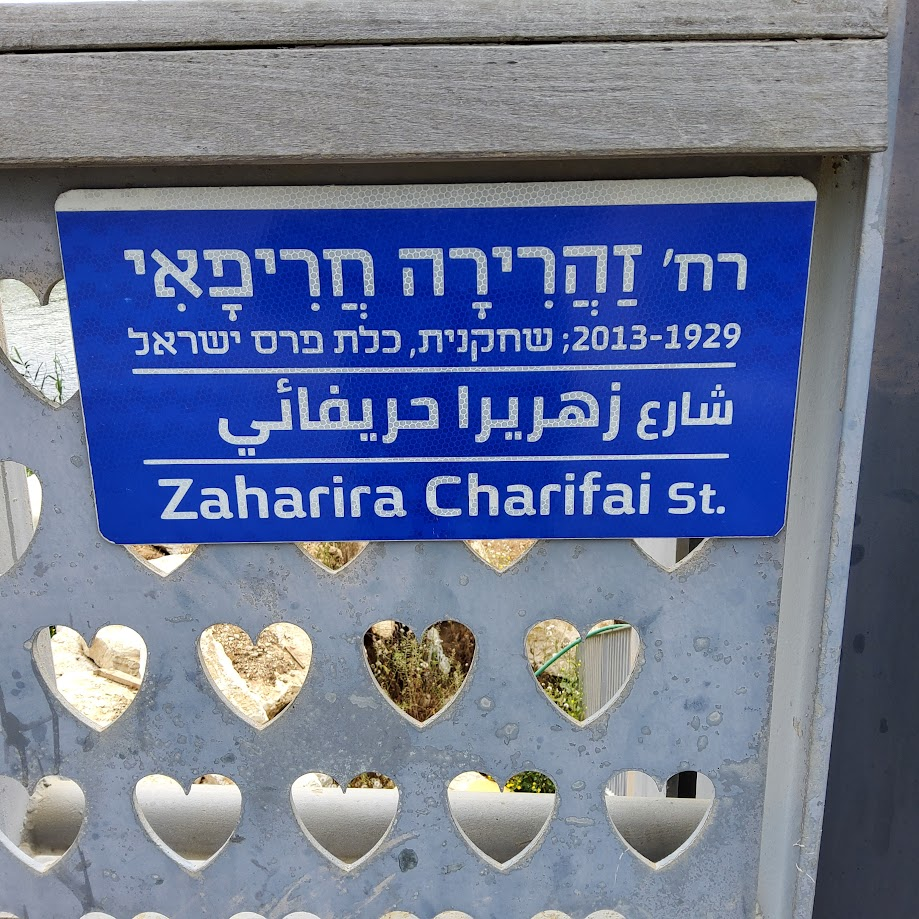
Photo of the street name sign in her honor in Tel Aviv

== Awards and recognition ==
Harifai received a Lifetime Achievement Award from the Israeli Theatre Academy in 2001, the Israel Prize for Theatre in 2003, and an Appreciation Award at the "Woman Festival" in 2004.

In 2012, she won the Israeli Theatre Prize for Best Supporting Actress for the play A Good End at the Cameri.

== Personal life ==
Harifai was married to the journalist and author Shlomo Shva, and the couple had a daughter, the actress Aya Sheba, and grandchildren.

Harifai's older brother, Ben Shahar Harifai, was a military judge and a traffic court judge.

She died on January 2, 2013, from cancer, and was buried at the Givat Hashlosha Cemetery.

== Legacy ==
In October 2014, a commemorative plaque was installed on her home at 14 Zecharya Street in Tel Aviv.

In 2021 a street in Tel Aviv was named after her, and the bridge from which she jumped to save the women in the Yarkon River was also renamed in her honor.
