= Sara Kishon =

Israeli musician and art collector (1931–2002)

- שרה קישון
- Born: Sara Lipovitz; 8 October 1931; Tel Aviv, Mandatory Palestine
- Died: 24 March 2002 (aged 70); Tel Aviv, Israel
- Spouse: Ephraim Kishon (m. 1959)
- Children: 2

Sara Kishon (Hebrew: שרה קישון; 8 October 1931 – 24 March 2002) was an Israeli pianist, art collector, and the wife of the author and satirist Ephraim Kishon.

== Biography ==
Sara was a graduate of the Juilliard School in New York with a Master's in Music and Piano.

Ephraim and Sara Kishon got married in 1959. Sara Kishon was known in Kishon's books as the "Little Woman" or "The Best Wife of All". Sara was a significant driving force in Ephraim Kishon's career and international success. Sara is the mother of Amir and Renana Kishon.

In 1975, Sara and Ephraim Kishon established The Kishon Gallery. It quickly became a leading gallery in its field, participating in many art fairs in Europe. In 2009 the gallery was renovated with additional space for contemporary art emphasizing fresh, young, cultural activity in a meticulous exhibition space by daughter Renana Kishon.

In 1998, Sara Kishon published her first book, gathering her favorite Kishon's stories in one book, with her comments and stories.
