= The Fox in the Chicken Coop =

- Directed by: Ephraim Kishon
- Written by: Ephraim Kishon
- Produced by: Ephraim Kishon; Itzik Kol
- Cinematography: David Gurfinkel
- Edited by: Hadassa Shani
- Music by: Nurit Hirsch
- Release date: 1978
- Running time: 90 minutes
- Country: Israel
- Language: Hebrew

The Fox in the Chicken Coop (Hebrew: השועל בלול התרנגולות, Ha Shu'al B'Lul Hatarnegolot) is a 1978 Israeli film directed by Ephraim Kishon, based on Kishon's satirical book of the same name. It features many prominent Israeli actors of the time, most notably Shaike Ophir and Sefi Rivlin. The film takes a satirical look at the old generation of Israeli politicians. The film was Kishon's last film and was considered a failure.

== Plot ==
Amitz Dolniker, an aging Israeli Parliament member known for his high-winded babbling and tireless lecturing, is told he needs to take a break from politics after he collapses during a speech. Fainting, he starts out on a dream trip to spend some weeks in a far-away, backward Israeli village that has little contact with civilization. The farmers’ bucolic and carefree life repels him at first (and especially the fact that they have never heard of him), but then he decides to introduce some “order” to the innocent society. As none of the villagers agree to become the village head (they don't want the trouble), Dolniker hires a local horse and buggy and puts it at the service of the village barber, declaring him village head “de facto”. The barber objects at first, but as he becomes used to the perks that come with the position, his grip on power tightens. This leads to a rivalry with other villagers (especially the cobbler) who think themselves equally worthy of becoming the village head (with free horse-and-buggy, of course), which is what Dolniker has expected. He suggests an election to determine the leader. The result, however, bears no resemblance to the orderly political process he is used to, and Dolniker finds himself entangled in silly power struggles, taxes imposed on 3-door closets, corruption, petty bureaucracy, and a ruination of the simple way of life the village once knew. Dolniker comes back to his senses, mildly amused with himself.

== Cast ==
- Shaike Ophir as Amitz Dolniker
- Sefi Rivlin as Dolniker's secretary, Ze'ev
- Zaharira Harifai as Dolniker's wife, Ge'ula
- Ya'ackov Bodo as the barber, Zalaman Hasidov
- Mosko Alkalai as the cobbler, Tzemach Gurevitch
- Nitza Saul as Miss Goorevitch
