= Sallah Shabati =

1964 film by Ephraim Kishon

- סאלח שבתי
- Directed by: Ephraim Kishon
- Written by: Ephraim Kishon
- Produced by: Menahem Golan
- Starring: Chaim Topol; Arik Einstein; Gila Almagor; Shraga Friedman
- Cinematography: Floyd Crosby
- Production company: Herzliya Studios
- Distributed by: Noah Films
- Release date: June 1964
- Running time: 110 minutes
- Country: Israel
- Language: Hebrew
- Budget: 400,000 lirot.

Sallah Shabati (Hebrew: סאלח שבתי) is a 1964 Israeli comedy film about the chaos of Israeli immigration and resettlement, as well as the issues Mizrahi Jews faced in the developing Israeli society. This social satire placed the director Ephraim Kishon and producer Menahem Golan among the first Israeli filmmakers to achieve international success. It also introduced to audiences to actor Chaim Topol, who would later achieve even greater recognition with the 1971 American period musical film Fiddler on the Roof.

The protagonist's name, Sallah Shabati, is perhaps a play on the phrase סליחה שבאתי, Sliḥa she'bati, "I apologise for coming/I regret coming here". In earlier print versions of Kishon's short stories which were revised for the film, the character was known as Saadia Shabtai.

This is the first Israeli film to be nominated for the Oscar for Best Foreign Language Film and the first to win the Golden Globe award for best Foreign Film. Later, it was also produced as a musical.

== Plot ==
The film begins with Sallah Shabati, a Mizrahi Jewish immigrant, arriving in Israel by plane with his family: his very pregnant wife, an ancient female relative, and seven children. Upon arrival, he is taken to live in a ma'abara, or transit camp, where he and his family are given a broken-down, one-room shack to live in.

The rest of the film follows Sallah's many attempts to earn enough money to purchase an apartment in a nearby new housing development. His money-making schemes are often comical and frequently satirize the political and social stereotypes in Israel at the time.

Finally realizing that people are more likely to get what they don't want, he organizes a demonstration against the housing office, shouting the slogan: "We don't want the development: we want the ma'abara!" The film ends with residents being forcibly evicted by police and transported to the new housing complex.

== Cast ==
- Topol as Sallah Shabati (as Haym Topol)
- Arik Einstein as Zigi, the kibbutznik boyfriend of Sallah's eldest daughter
- Geula Nuni as Habbubah Shabati (as Geula Noni), Sallah's daughter
- Gila Almagor as Batsheva Ha'Sosialit (social worker)
- Albert Cohen
- Shraga Friedman as Neuman, the kibbutz secretary (administrator)
- Zaharira Harifai as Frieda, a kibbutz supervisor (and the real power)
- Shaike Levi as Shimon Shabati, Sallah's son
- Nathan Meisler as Mr. Goldstein, Sallah's neighbor and backgammon pal
- Esther Greenberg as Sallah's wife
- Mordecai Arnon as Mordecai

== Themes ==
Sallah Shabati's irreverent and mocking depiction of core Zionist institutions like the kibbutz provoked strong reactions among many filmgoers and critics. "The kibbutzniks in the film resemble bureaucrats and are clearly divided into veterans with managing roles and 'simple' workers, a division which contradicts the myth of Socialist solidarity and collectivist idealism. The kibbutzniks betray total indifference, furthermore, to the miserable conditions of the poor ma'abara next to them."

== Critical reception ==
Sallah Shabati received mixed reviews but achieved unprecedented box office success in Israel, drawing almost 1.3 million spectators.

New York Times critic A.H. Weiler called the film "more educational than hilarious", and said "Sallah Shabbati and his coterie are an unusual, endearing, often colorful lot, but their humor is largely rudimentary."

It won the Hollywood Foreign Press Association's Golden Globe Award as Best Foreign Film, and opened and closed the Berlin Film Festival. The film was nominated for a 1964 Academy Award in the category of Best Foreign Language Film, a first for an Israeli production, but it lost the Oscar to the Italian film, Yesterday, Today and Tomorrow.

The film won best actor (Haim Topol) and best screenplay (Ephraim Kishon) in the 1964 San Francisco International Film Festival.

== See also ==
- List of submissions to the 37th Academy Awards for Best Foreign Language Film
- List of Israeli submissions for the Academy Award for Best Foreign Language Film
- Bourekas film
