= The Policeman =

- Directed by: Ephraim Kishon
- Written by: Ephraim Kishon
- Produced by: Ephraim Kishon; Itzik Kol; Mati Raz
- Starring: Shaike Ophir; Zaharira Harifai; Joseph Shiloach
- Cinematography: David Gurfinkel
- Edited by: Anna Gurit
- Music by: Nurit Hirsh, Ehud Manor, Oshik Levy
- Distributed by: Cinema 5 Distributing
- Release date: 1971
- Running time: 87 minutes
- Country: Israel
- Languages: Hebrew; Yiddish; French; English; Arabic

The Policeman (Hebrew: השוטר אזולאי, romanized: HaShoter Azoulay, lit. 'The Policeman Azoulay') is a 1971 Israeli feature film, written, directed and co-produced by satirist Ephraim Kishon. The touching protagonist `The Policeman Azoulay` is played by Shaike Ophir (credited as Shay K. Ophir), in what is considered one of his finest performances.

The film was nominated for the 1972 Academy Award for Best Foreign Language Film, and won the Golden Globe Award in the same category. It won several other awards, such as best foreign film in the Barcelona film festival and best director in the Monte Carlo festival. In Israel, it is considered a cinematic classic.

== Plot ==
Officer Avraham Azoulay is a patrolman in Tel Aviv's district of Jaffa. He is an honest man, though extremely naive, and because of his character, has never been promoted during his twenty years in the force. He is married to a dull woman (played by veteran actress Zaharira Harifai); the couple have no children.

His superiors, Captain Levkovich and First Sergeant Bejerano, decide not to renew his contract, though they feel sorry for him. In the meantime, he falls in love with the simple but charming prostitute Mimi, and removes her photograph from the arrests billboard. His wife finds the photo and tears it to pieces, which Azoulay secretly glues together again. Nevertheless, this love will not be realized as Azoulay refuses to divorce his wife, claiming that "it will destroy her". In addition, being a Kohen, he cannot marry a prostitute according to Halakha.

Azoulay shows some success at dispersing a demonstration without resorting to violence because of his knowledge of the Bible and of Yiddish; he also charms a group of visiting French policemen who adore the French-speaking policeman; in an Arab-speaking club house he gives an unaware speech in Arabic. Azoulay is able to see people for what they are and not what they represent. None of these events, however, help to change his superiors' decision to dismiss him. Azoulay strikes a friendship with Amar, unaware that he is a notorious criminal. The criminal and his associates decide to fake a crime and allow Azoulay to catch them in the act so that he receives a promotion and regains his contract. They finally decide upon stealing ritual objects, including a large golden cross, from a monastery in the neighbourhood. Azoulay manages to catch the criminal in the act and is finally promoted to the rank of a sergeant, but his contract is not renewed and he is forced to retire from the police.

In the final scene, Officer Azoulay leaves the precinct with his new rank and policemen practising marches in the courtyard are being ordered to salute in his general direction by Bejerano. The final shot of the film presents Azoulay saluting the marching policemen, thinking that they are saluting him, as his eyes fill with tears. This image became one of the most memorable in Israeli cinema.

== Cast ==
- Shaike Ophir as Constable Sgt. Abraham Azoulay
- Zaharira Harifai as Betty Azoulay
- Avner Hizkiyahu as Capt. Lefkowitch
- Itzko Rachamimov as Senior Sgt. Bejerano
- Yosef Shiloach as Amar
- Nitza Saul as Mimi
- Gabi Amrani as The Yemenite
- Arieh Itzhak as Zion
- Abraham Celektar as Cactus
- Efraim Stan as Horovitz

== Awards and recognition ==
The Policeman is widely considered to be a classic of Israeli cinema. The Film was nominated for the 44th Academy Awards for Best Foreign Language Film, and won the 1972 Golden Globe award for Best Foreign-Language Foreign Film

== See also ==
- List of submissions to the 44th Academy Awards for Best Foreign Language Film
- List of Israeli submissions for the Academy Award for Best Foreign Language Film
