= Ephraim Kishon =

Israeli author and filmmaker (1924–2005)

- אפרים קישון
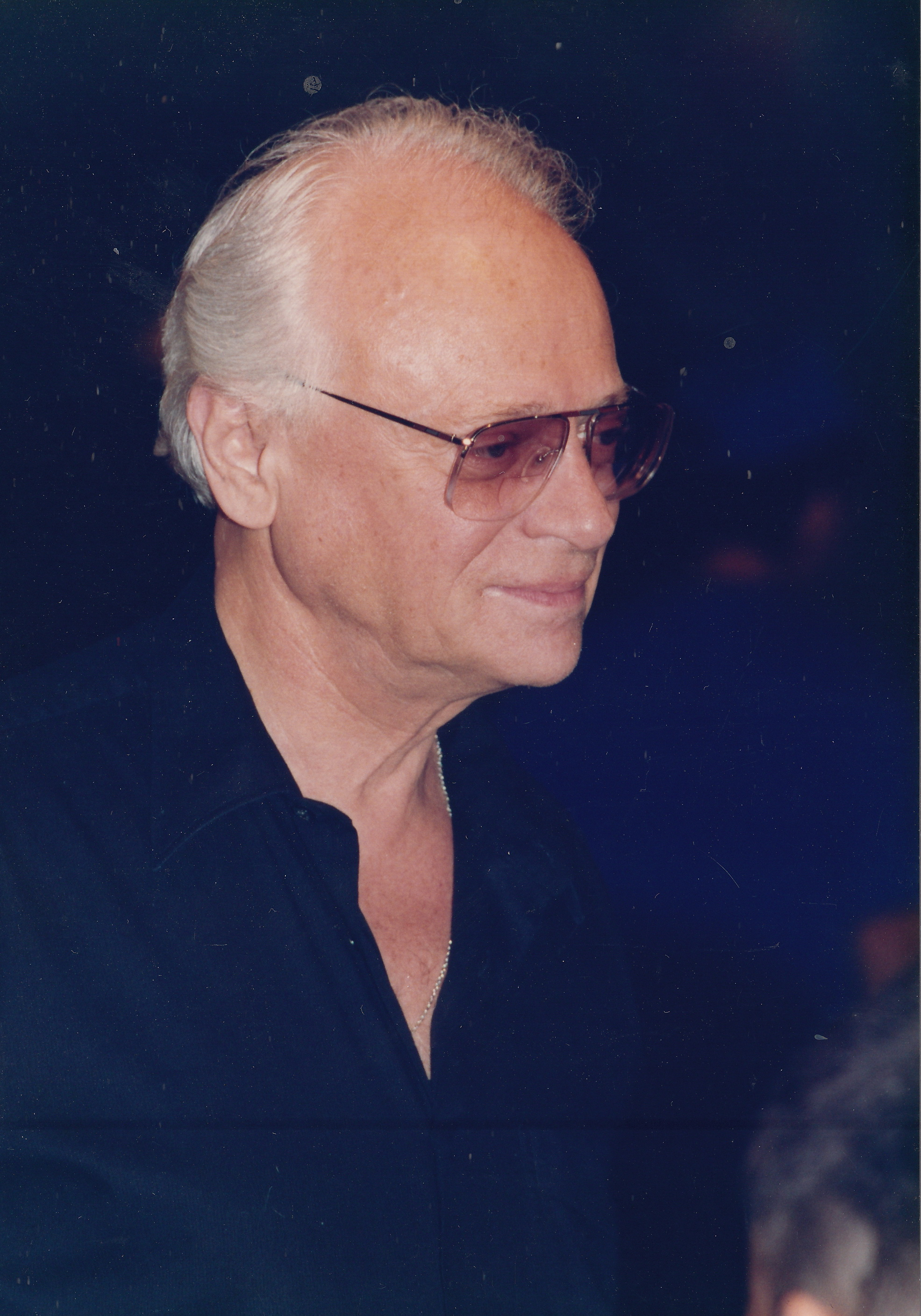
- Kishon in 2000
- Born: Ferenc Hoffmann; 23 August 1924; Budapest, Hungary
- Died: 29 January 2005 (aged 80); Appenzell, Switzerland
- Occupations: Film director; novelist; playwright; screenwriter; columnist; satirist
- Years active: 1945–2005
- Spouses: Eva Klamer (m. 1946; div. 1959); Sara Kishon (m. 1959; died 2002); Lisa Witasek (m. 2003)
- Children: 3
- Awards: Israel Prize (2002)

Ephraim Kishon (Hebrew: אפרים קישון; 23 August 1924 – 29 January 2005) was a Hungarian-born Israeli author, dramatist, screenwriter, and Oscar-nominated film director. A Holocaust survivor who immigrated to Israel in 1949, he became the young state's leading satirist, writing a daily satirical column, "Chad Gadya", in the newspaper Maariv for about 30 years and publishing dozens of books, many translated into 37 languages.

Kishon expanded into filmmaking in the 1960s, writing and directing five feature films; Sallah Shabati (1964) and The Policeman (1971) were both nominated for the Academy Award for Best Foreign Language Film and won Golden Globe Awards in the category. His films and characters, along with his writing, are credited with shaping Israeli popular culture and helping give rise to the Bourekas film genre. He was also a lifelong chess enthusiast whose passion for the game inspired a talking chess computer, the Kishon Chesster. His work was especially celebrated in West Germany and Austria, where in 1990 he received the Order of Merit of the Federal Republic of Germany.

Although Kishon was one of the most widely read satirists in Israel, he came to feel that the Israeli literary establishment looked down on his popular style, and his domestic acclaim waned somewhat in the 1970s even as his books topped the bestseller lists in West Germany and Austria, where his reception became the subject of later academic study. He received the Israel Prize for lifetime achievement in 2002. Kishon died in Switzerland in 2005 at the age of 80.

== Biography ==
Ephraim Kishon was born on 23 August 1924, in Budapest, Hungary, as Ferenc Hoffmann, the son of a bank manager.

His writing talent became evident in his youth: in 1940 he won a novella-writing competition for high school students. Barred from continuing his university studies under Hungary's antisemitic legislation, he became a goldsmith.

The Nazis confined Kishon in several concentration camps over the course of World War II. In 1944 he was deported to a labor camp at Jolsva (now Jelšava, Slovakia), where he served as secretary to the district commandant, who sought a chess opponent; as Perry, Jackl and Lochekhina write, Kishon had to "play well enough to stay alive but not so well that the commandant would kill him in a moment of anger". At another camp, the Germans lined up the prisoners and shot every tenth man, skipping over him. He later described the episode in his book The Scapegoat, writing that "they made a mistake—they left one satirist alive". According to Vági, Csősz and Kádár and the Hungarian daily Index, he escaped from the Jolsva camp and made his way to Budapest, where he spent the rest of the war in hiding. The Guardian and The Independent instead describe him escaping while being marched toward the Sobibor extermination camp; The Independent adds that he fled at the Polish border and spent the rest of the war as a Slovak labourer under the name Stanko Andras. Only his parents and one sister survived, from an extended family of twenty.

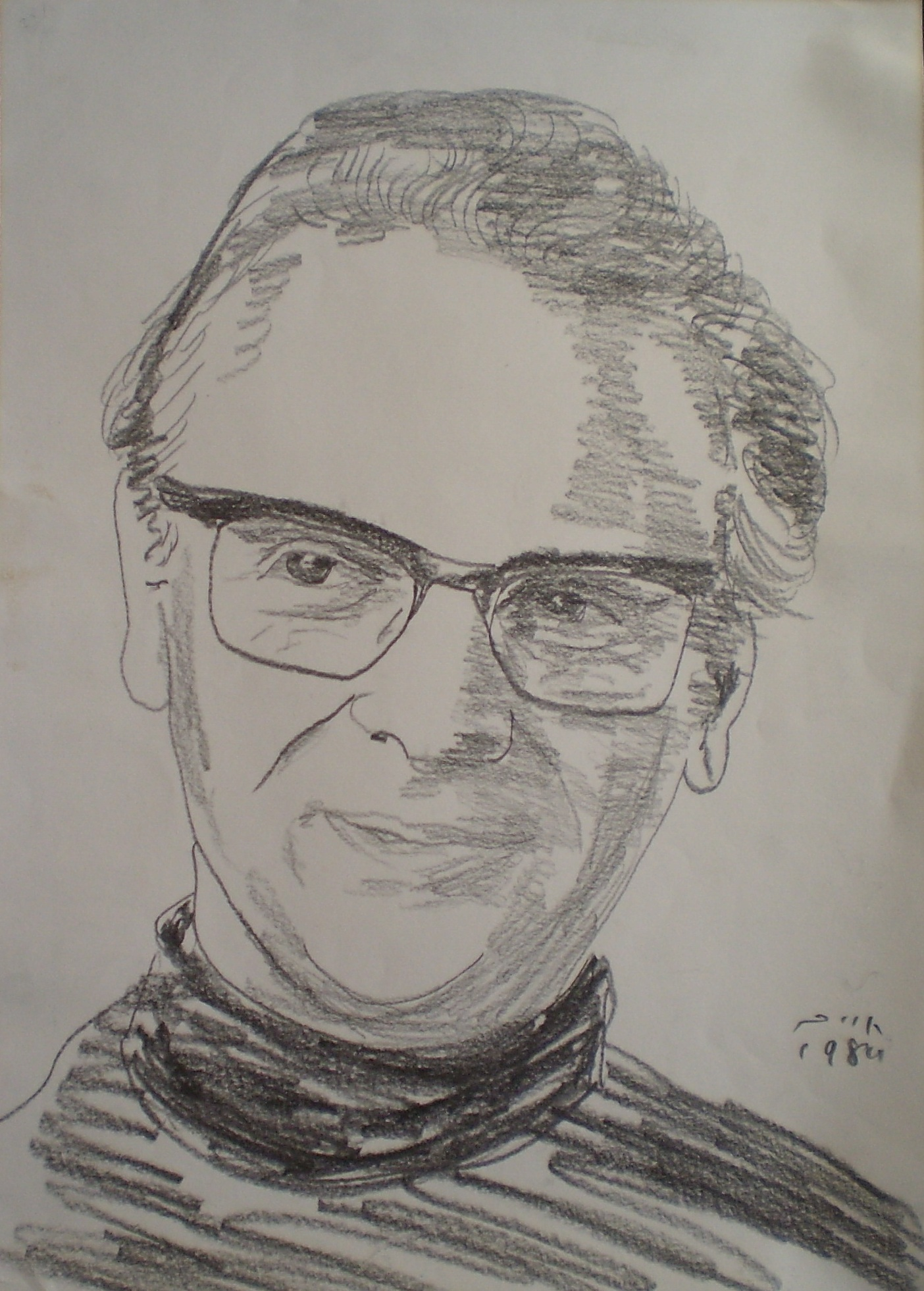
Drawing of Kishon by Chaim Topol

His surname became Kishont after the war, and by 1948 he had completed a course in art history, publishing humorous articles under the pseudonym Ferenc Kishont.

In 1949 he immigrated to the newly founded state of Israel, together with his first wife Eva (Chawa) Klamer, to escape the Communist regime. When he disembarked in Haifa and gave his name as Ferenc, the clerk told him "that's not a real name" and gave him the name Ephraim Kishon instead, after a river near Haifa on Mount Carmel.

His first marriage, to Eva Klamer, ended in divorce in 1959. He then married Sara (née Lipovitz), who died in 2002; his third wife, Lisa Witasek, survived him. Kishon had three children: Raphael ("Rafi"), Amir, and Renana.

In 1981, Kishon established a second home in the rural Swiss canton of Appenzell; according to The New York Times, he had come to feel unwelcome in Israel as an immigrant.

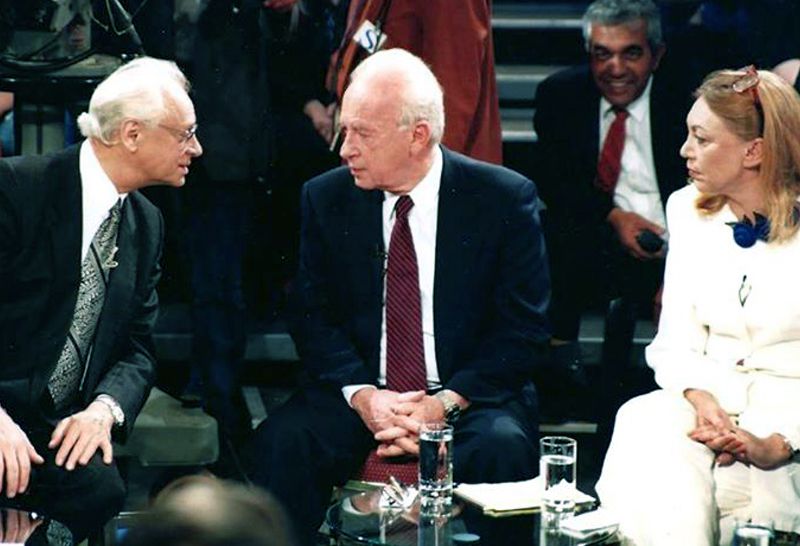
Kishon talking with Prime Minister Yitzhak Rabin, 1992

Kishon died on 29 January 2005 at his home in Appenzell at the age of 80 of a heart attack; his third wife, Lisa, was with him. His coffin was flown to Israel and, on 1 February, was placed at Beit Sokolov, the Tel Aviv home of the journalists' association, where colleagues, family and readers paid their respects. A memorial ceremony led by Chaim Topol, who had played the title role in Sallah Shabati, preceded the procession to the old cemetery on Trumpeldor Street, where Kishon was buried beside the grave of his wife Sara. His sons Rafi and Amir recited the mourner's prayer; his daughter Renana read from letters he had sent his children while travelling abroad; and Tommy Lapid and Education Minister Limor Livnat were among those who eulogised him.

== Literary career ==
Kishon initially lived in the "Sha'ar Ha'Aliyah" transit camp near Haifa, and soon afterwards moved to Kibbutz Kfar HaHoresh, where he immersed himself in learning Hebrew during his free time. During this period he wrote several short humorous pieces for the Hungarian newspaper "Új Kelet". He then moved to a housing project, where he continued studying Hebrew, and soon became proficient in the language. His heavy Hungarian accent accompanied him throughout his life.

By 1951, after two years in the country, Kishon was writing a satirical column for the newspaper Davar, in which he published a satirical piece, "Legend of a Tel Aviv Canal", which later formed the basis for his film Blaumilch Canal. That same year he published his first book in Israel, Ha-ole Ha-Yored le-Chayenu ("The Pestering Immigrant"), about the life experiences of new immigrants in Israel during the 1950s.

In 1952 Kishon began writing a regular satirical column called "Chad Gadya" ("One Young Goat" in Aramaic, taken from the Passover Seder liturgy) in the daily Hebrew tabloid "Ma'ariv". Kishon kept writing the column for about 30 years, while in the first two decades he published a new column almost every day. Within a few years after launching his writing career in Israel Kishon became one of the most prominent humorists and satirists in the country.

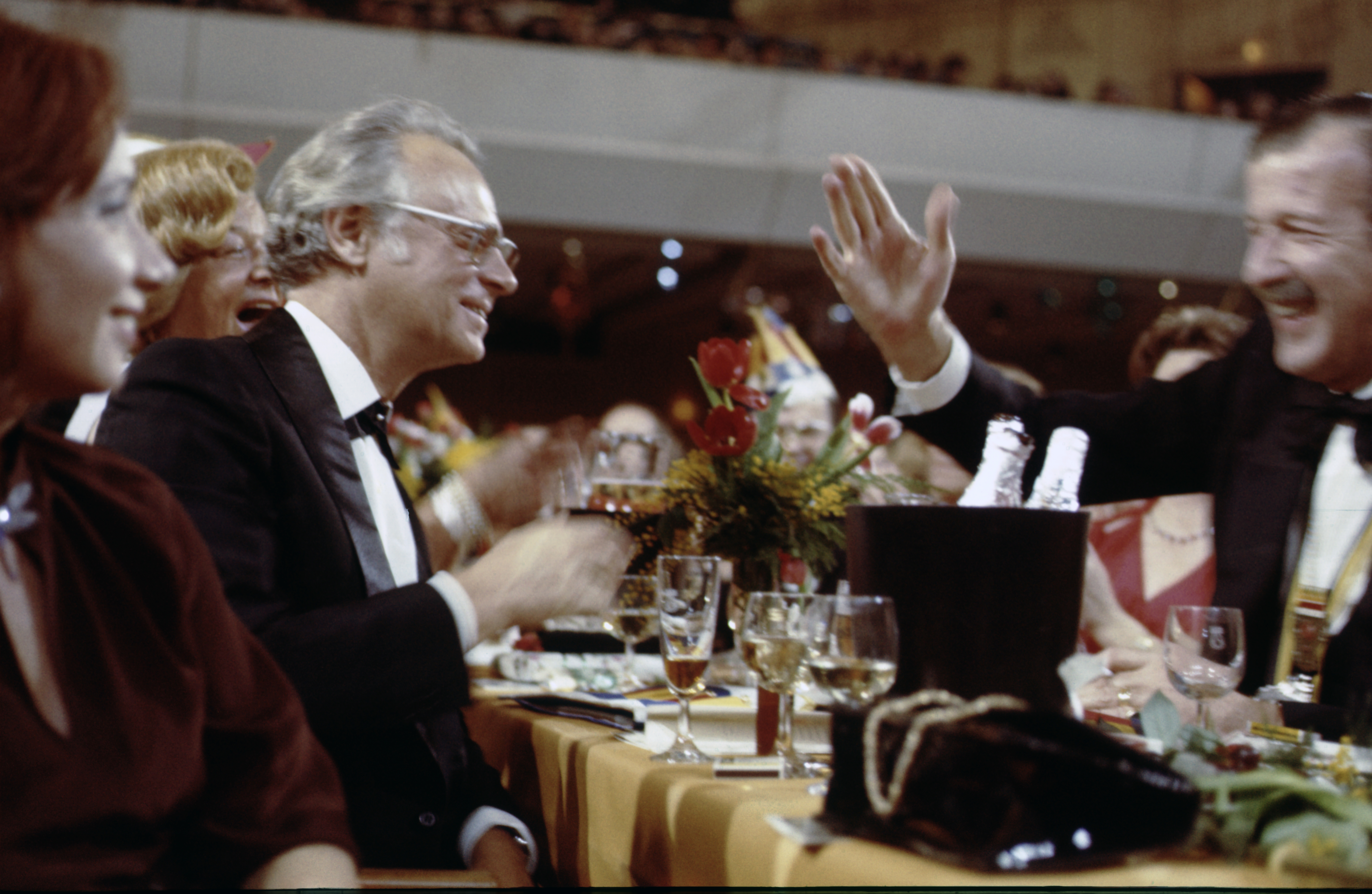
Kishon at the Aachen carnival in West Germany, 1978

Kishon's stage writing developed alongside his newspaper work. His comedy Ha-Ketuba (The Marriage Contract, 1961) had one of the longest runs in the history of Israeli theatre, and his sketches and plays were later performed on stage and television in many countries. Collections of his short satirical pieces appeared in Hebrew from the early 1950s onward, among them Shmo Holech Lefanav (His Name Precedes Him, 1953), Ma'arachonim (Short Pieces, 1965) and Shminiot Ba-Avir (Bending Over Backwards, 1965). In all he published 42 books for adults and eight for children, translated into 37 languages.

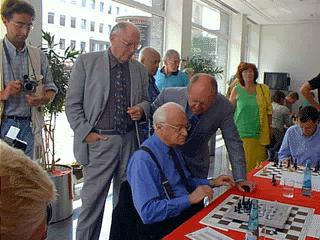
Ephraim Kishon (front) at a simultaneous chess exhibition by Vladimir Kramnik, Dortmund 2001; behind him is Alfred Schlya, president of the German Chess Federation.

Kishon's books sold particularly well in Germany. Kishon rejected the notion of collective German guilt for the Holocaust, a stance later examined as part of the broader academic account of his reception in West Germany. Friedrich Torberg translated his work into German until Torberg's death in 1979; by then, Kishon had mastered German well enough to write his own translations thereafter.

== Chess ==
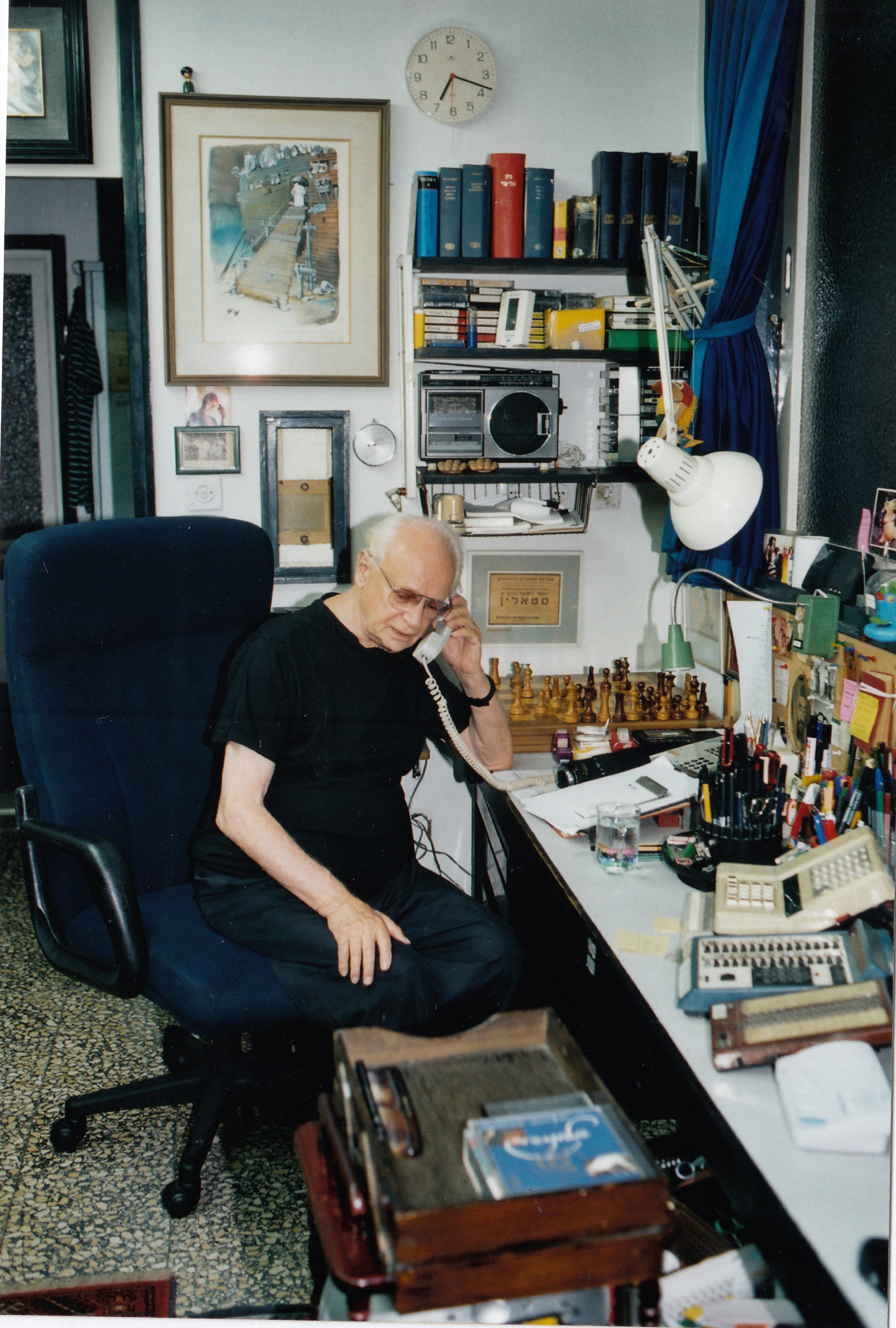
Kishon at his home office, with a chess set on the shelf behind him

Kishon was a lifelong chess enthusiast, and took an early interest in chess-playing computers. In 1990, German chess computer manufacturer Hegener & Glaser together with Fidelity produced the Kishon Chesster, a chess computer distinguished by the spoken comments it would make during a game. Kishon wrote the comments to be humorous, but they were also carefully chosen to be relevant to chess and the position in the game.

== Reception and legacy ==
The Israel Film Archive describes Kishon as one of the central figures of modern Israeli satire, whose linguistic style and stage/screen characters became embedded in everyday spoken Hebrew and Israeli popular culture. His five feature films are credited with shaping Israeli popular cinema and helping pave the way for the Bourekas film genre of Israeli comedies.

The Posen Library identifies Kishon as Israel's foremost satirist of the early state period, whose work regularly targeted the ruling Labor Zionist party and highlighted discriminatory attitudes of Ashkenazi Israelis toward newly arrived Mizrahi immigrants. Despite this, Kishon increasingly felt that his best-selling work was looked down on as "middlebrow" by the Israeli literary establishment, and his domestic popularity waned somewhat during the 1970s even as his acclaim in Germany grew. By the 1980s, as his political sympathies shifted further to the right, Kishon described himself as an outsider within Israel's literary and media establishment, and increasingly turned from satire to overtly political opinion writing.

A 2017 reissue of a book of conversations between Kishon and journalist Yaron London drew renewed critical attention to a tension in his later work: reviewers noted a contrast between the versatile, funny satirist and a more pessimistic, cynical figure whose uncompromising positions on Israel's rectitude were seen as having undermined his ability to produce sharp humor.

Kishon's satire found an unusually large readership in West Germany and Austria from the 1960s onward, and his books topped West German bestseller lists into the 1980s. Kishon himself tended to attribute this popularity to a kind of historical irony; a 2020 academic study instead traces it to the specific dynamics of the West German publishing industry and the broader politics of postwar German–Israeli reconciliation. The same study argues that Kishon's outspoken political commentary in the German press following the 1967 Six-Day War helped set a lasting pattern in how Israeli authors' work is read and discussed in Germany. A 2024 biography further examined the complex relationship between Kishon, a Holocaust survivor, and his large West German readership, many of whom were descendants of the perpetrators.

The Israel Film Archive and the National Library of Israel credit Sallah Shabati with having inaugurated the Bourekas film genre — ethnic comedies and melodramas centered on tensions between Mizrahi immigrants and Israel's Ashkenazi establishment — which dominated Israeli popular cinema through the mid-1970s. Scholar Yaron Peleg argues that Kishon's title character from Sallah Shabati became an archetype whose traits Kishon himself continued to explore in The Policeman, while also noting that the genre's broadly comic treatment of ethnic and class tension drew criticism for softening more serious social issues into sentimental comedy.

== Books, plays, and films ==
=== Books ===
Kishon wrote 42 books for adults and eight for children, most of them collections of satirical pieces. A selection, with titles and years as catalogued by the Institute for Hebrew Literature:

- Immigrant Upon Us (Ha-Oleh Ha-Yored Le-Hayenu, 1951)
- His Name Precedes Him (Shmo Holech Lefanav, 1953)
- Ein-Kmunim (1955); republished in 1972 as The Fox in the Chicken House (Ha-Shual Be-Lul Ha-Tarnegolot), the basis for the 1978 film
- It Could Be Worse (Lo Norah, 1957)
- It All Depends (Hacol Talui, 1961)
- One of Those Yesterdays (Be-Ehad Ha-Emeshim, 1962)
- He and She (Hu Ve-Hi, 1963)
- Short Pieces (Ma'arachonim, 1965)
- Bending Over Backwards (Shminiot Ba-Avir, 1965)
- So Sorry We Won (Sliha She-Nitzahnu, 1967)
- Woe to the Victors (Oy La-Menatzhim, 1969)
- A Hole in the Curtain (Hor Ba-Masach, 1973)
- Six Comedies (Shesh Comediot, 1977)
- Those Were Jonathan's Travels (Ele Masaot Yonatan, 1981), children's book
- Second Book of Satire (Sefer Ha-Satirot Ha-Sheni, 1990)
- Third Book of Satire (Sefer Ha-Satirot Ha-Shelishi, 1992)
- 58 Short Pieces (58 Ma'arachonim, 1995)
- My Family Right or Wrong (Sefer Mishpachti, 2002)
- Picasso's Sweet Revenge (Nikmato Ha-Metuka Shel Picasso, 2004)

=== Plays ===
Kishon's first play, His Name Precedes Him (Shemo Holekh Lefanav), ran at Habima Theatre in 1953; over the following decades he wrote for Habima, the Ohel Theatre and the Cameri Theatre. The years below are those of the published texts, as catalogued by the Institute for Hebrew Literature.

- His Name Precedes Him (Shemo Holekh Lefanav, 1953), Habima
- Black on White (Shahor Al Gabei Lavan, 1956), Habima
- The Marriage Contract (Ha-Ketuba, 1961), Ohel
- Unplug It, the Water is Boiling (Totzi Et Ha-Shteker, Ha-Mayim Rotehim, 1965) Cameri
- Oh, Oh Juliet (Ho, Ho Julia, 1974) Habima
- Sallah Shabati, the musical (1988), Habima

=== Films ===
Kishon wrote, directed and produced five feature films between 1964 and 1978, all of them comedic or satirical.

- Sallah Shabati (1964), nominated for Oscar for best foreign language film Israeli comedy film about the chaos of Israeli immigration and resettlement which was critical of the treatment immigrants to Israel received depicting immigrants being vilified by Ashkenazi Israelis. This social satire placed Kishon among the first Israeli filmmakers to achieve international success.
- Ervinka (1967), written and directed by Kishon. The film, starring Topol, is a comical tale of a con man who falls in love with a police officer.
- Blaumilch Canal, also known as The Big Dig (1969, nominated for Golden Globe 1970), an Israeli comedy which depicts the madness of bureaucracy through a municipality's reaction to the actions of a lunatic.
- The Policeman, original Hebrew title Ha-Shoter Azoulay (literally, Constable Azoulay) (1971, nominated for Oscar for best foreign language film, awarded 1972 Golden Globe for best foreign language film). Houston Press writer Adam Castaneda described it as a classic of Israeli cinema.
- The Fox in the Chicken Coop (1978), based on Kishon's satirical book by the same name (Hebrew: Ha Shu'al B'Lool HaTarnegolot), features many prominent Israeli actors of the time, most notably Shaike Ophir and Seffy Rivlin. The film takes a satirical, comic look at the old generation of Israeli politicians.

== Awards ==
- 1953, Nordau Prize for Literature
- 1958, Sokolov Prize for Journalism
- 1964, Kinor David (David's Harp) Prize
- 1970, Herzl Award for Hungarian Jewry
- 1990, Officer's Cross of the Order of Merit of the Federal Republic of Germany (Verdienstkreuz 1. Klasse)
- 1998, co-recipient (jointly with Nurit Guvrin and Aryeh Sivan) of the Bialik Prize for Hebrew literature
- 2002, Israel Prize for lifetime achievement & special contribution to society and the State of Israel Upon receiving the Israel Prize, he remarked: "I've won the Israel Prize, even though I'm pro-Israel. It's almost like a state pardon. They usually give it to one of those liberals who love the Palestinians and hate the settlers."

=== Film ===
Kishon was nominated twice for an Academy Award for Best Foreign Language Film and four times for a Golden Globe Award. He won three Golden Globes: Best Foreign Language Film for Sallah Shabati (1965) and The Policeman (1972), and the Samuel Goldwyn International Award for Sallah Shabati (1965).
