= 1979 in film =

The year 1979 in film involved many significant events.

== Highest-grossing films ==
=== United States and Canada ===
The top ten 1979 released films by North American gross are as follows:

Highest-grossing films of 1979 (United States and Canada)
Rank	Title	Distributor	Box-office gross
1	Kramer vs. Kramer	Columbia	$106,260,000
2	The Amityville Horror	American International	$86,432,520
3	Rocky II	United Artists	$85,182,160
4	Apocalypse Now	United Artists	$83,471,511
5	Star Trek: The Motion Picture	Paramount	$82,258,456
6	Alien	20th Century Fox	$80,931,801
7	The Muppet Movie	Universal / Associated Film	$76,657,000
8	10	Warner Bros.	$74,865,517
9	The Jerk	Universal	$73,691,419
10	Moonraker	United Artists	$70,308,099

=== International ===
Highest-grossing films of 1979 (international markets)
International market	Title	Distributor	Admissions	Gross revenue		Production country
International market	Title	Distributor	Admissions	Local currency	US$	Production country
China	Gunshots in the CIB	Changchun Film Studio	600,000,000	CN¥180,000,000	$116,000,000	China
France	The Gendarme and the Extra-Terrestrials	SNC	6,280,070	Unknown	Unknown	France
West Germany	The Jungle Book	20th Century Fox	9,103,582	€32,092,155	$44,000,000	United States
India	Suhaag	Sharma Cine Associates	Unknown	₹100,000,000	$12,310,000	India
Italy	Superman	Columbia-EMI-Warner	904,000	Unknown	Unknown	United States
Japan	Galaxy Express 999	Toei	Unknown	¥16,500,000,000	$76,120,000	Japan
Soviet Union	Sholay (Embers)	R. K. Films	60,000,000	15,000,000 Rbls (Note: 60 million tickets sold, average ticket price of 25 kopecks)	$28,200,000 (Note: See List of highest-grossing films in the Soviet Union § Highest-grossing foreign films.)	India
Spain	Superman	Warner Bros.	4,795,628	₧655,346,759	$9,763,080	United States
United Kingdom	Superman	Columbia-EMI-Warner	10,190,000	£11,547,308	$24,455,309	United States

== Major events ==
- March 2 – Buena Vista release their first film since the advent of U.S. movie ratings to not be G-rated, Take Down.
- March 5 – Production begins on The Empire Strikes Back.
- March – Frank Price becomes president of Columbia Pictures.
- May 25 – Alien, a landmark of the science fiction genre, is released.
- May 29 - Mary Pickford, a silent screen legend and Hollywood pioneer who was, at the height of her career, the most famous woman in the world, dies of a stroke.
- May 31 – The Muppet Movie, Jim Henson's Muppets' first foray into the world of feature-length motion pictures, is released in United Kingdom.
- June 11 – John Wayne, a famous Western movie actor, dies at the age of 72 from stomach cancer.
- June 27 – 20th Century Fox Pictures president Alan Ladd Jr. and vice-presidents Jay Kanter and Gareth Wigan agree to leave Fox.
- June 29 – Moonraker, the 11th film in the James Bond franchise, is released in the United States and goes on to become the highest-grossing film of the year worldwide.
- August 15 – Apocalypse Now is released to worldwide critical acclaim and box office success. Heralded as one of the greatest films ever made to this day.
- September 19 – Don Bluth and a group of fellow animators resign from The Walt Disney Company's animation department to set up a rival studio, Don Bluth Productions.
- October 1 – Alan Ladd Jr., Jay Kanter and Gareth Wigan who agreed to leave Fox earlier in the year formally announce the creation of The Ladd Company.
- October 3 – producers Benjamin Melniker and Michael E. Uslan purchase the film rights of Batman from DC Comics. It would be another ten years, before a Batman feature film would be fully realized.
- November 1 – Production begins on Raiders of the Lost Ark.
- December 7 – Star Trek: The Motion Picture debuts in the United States to mixed reviews but blockbuster box office, launching a film franchise that leads to 9 sequels and 3 reboots over the next 37 years. It also leads to the creation of five spin-off television series based upon Gene Roddenberry's creation.
- Allied Artists files for bankruptcy.

== Awards ==
Category/Organization	37th Golden Globe Awards January 26, 1980		33rd BAFTA Awards March 20, 1980	52nd Academy Awards April 14, 1980
Category/Organization	Drama	Musical or Comedy	33rd BAFTA Awards March 20, 1980	52nd Academy Awards April 14, 1980
Best Film	Kramer vs. Kramer	Breaking Away	Manhattan	Kramer vs. Kramer
Best Director	Francis Ford Coppola; Apocalypse Now			Robert Benton; Kramer vs. Kramer
Best Actor	Dustin Hoffman; Kramer vs. Kramer	Peter Sellers; Being There	Jack Lemmon; The China Syndrome	Dustin Hoffman; Kramer vs. Kramer
Best Actress	Sally Field; Norma Rae	Bette Midler; The Rose	Jane Fonda; The China Syndrome	Sally Field; Norma Rae
Best Supporting Actor	Melvyn Douglas; Being There; Robert Duvall; Apocalypse Now		Robert Duvall; Apocalypse Now	Melvyn Douglas; Being There
Best Supporting Actress	Meryl Streep; Kramer vs. Kramer		Rachel Roberts; Yanks	Meryl Streep; Kramer vs. Kramer
Best Screenplay, Adapted	Robert Benton; Kramer vs. Kramer		Woody Allen and Marshall Brickman; Manhattan	Robert Benton; Kramer vs. Kramer
Best Screenplay, Original	Robert Benton; Kramer vs. Kramer		Woody Allen and Marshall Brickman; Manhattan	Steve Tesich; Breaking Away
Best Original Score	Carmine Coppola and Francis Ford Coppola; Apocalypse Now		Ennio Morricone; Days of Heaven	Georges Delerue; A Little Romance; Ralph Burns; All That Jazz
Best Original Song	"The Rose"; The Rose		N/A	"It Goes Like It Goes"; Norma Rae
Best Foreign Language Film	La Cage aux Folles		N/A	The Tin Drum

Palme d'Or (Cannes Film Festival):

Apocalypse Now, directed by Francis Ford Coppola, United States
The Tin Drum (Die Blechtrommel), directed by Volker Schlöndorff, W. Germany

Golden Bear (Berlin Film Festival):

David, directed by Peter Lilienthal, West Germany

People's Choice Award (Toronto International Film Festival):

Best Boy, directed by Ira Wohl, United States

== 1979 films ==
=== By country/region ===
- List of American films of 1979
- List of Argentine films of 1979
- List of Australian films of 1979
- List of Bangladeshi films of 1979
- List of British films of 1979
- List of Canadian films of 1979
- List of French films of 1979
- List of Hong Kong films of 1979
- List of Indian films of 1979
  - List of Hindi films of 1979
  - List of Kannada films of 1979
  - List of Malayalam films of 1979
  - List of Marathi films of 1979
  - List of Tamil films of 1979
  - List of Telugu films of 1979
- List of Japanese films of 1979
- List of Mexican films of 1979
- List of Pakistani films of 1979
- List of South Korean films of 1979
- List of Soviet films of 1979
- List of Spanish films of 1979

=== By genre/medium ===
- List of action films of 1979
- List of animated feature films of 1979
- List of avant-garde films of 1979
- List of comedy films of 1979
- List of drama films of 1979
- List of horror films of 1979
- List of science fiction films of 1979
- List of thriller films of 1979
- List of western films of 1979

== Births ==
- January 1 – Vidya Balan, Indian actress
- January 2 - Erica Hubbard, American actress
- January 6 – Cristela Alonzo, American comedian, actress, writer and producer
- January 8
  - Ashraf Barhom, Israeli-Arab actor
  - Sarah Polley, Canadian actress
- January 10 - Maximilian Brückner, German actor
- January 13 - Katy Brand, English actress, comedian and writer
- January 16 – Aaliyah, American actress and singer (d. 2001)
- January 24 – Tatyana Ali, American actress and singer
- January 25 - Christine Lakin, American actress
- January 26 – Sara Rue, American actress
- January 27 – Rosamund Pike, English actress and producer
- January 28
  - Adam Bartley, American actor
  - Angelique Cabral, American actress
- January 29 – Andrew Keegan, American actor
- January 31 - Emmett J. Scanlan, Irish actor
- February 1 – Rachelle Lefevre, Canadian actress
- February 2 – Shamita Shetty, Indian actress
- February 3 – Costa Ronin, Australian actor and cinematographer
- February 7 - Cerina Vincent, American actress
- February 8 - Josh Keaton, American actor and musician
- February 9 – Zhang Ziyi, Chinese actress and dancer
- February 11 – Brandy Norwood, American actress and singer
- February 12 - Angus Sampson, Australian actor and filmmaker
- February 13 – Mena Suvari, American actress
- February 19 - Andrew Buchan, English actor and writer
- February 21
  - Tituss Burgess, American actor and singer
  - Maryke Hendrikse, Bahamian-born Canadian voice actress
  - Jennifer Love Hewitt, American actress and singer
  - Shakara Ledard, Bahamian actress
  - Jordan Peele, American actor, comedian, writer, director and producer
- March 3
  - Bonnie Mbuli, South African actress
  - Patrick Renna, American actor
- March 5 – Riki Lindhome, American actress, comedian and musician
- March 7 – Arlindo Lopes, Brazilian actor
- March 9 – Oscar Isaac, Guatemalan-American actor
- March 10
  - Edi Gathegi, Kenyan-American actor
  - Danny Pudi, American actor
- March 12 - Rhys Coiro, American actor
- March 14 - Chris Klein, American actor
- March 17 – Stephen Kramer Glickman, Canadian actor, music producer and stand-up comedian
- March 18 – Adam Levine, American singer, songwriter, musician and actor
- March 19 - Abby Brammell, American actress
- March 20
  - Freema Agyeman, British actress
  - Bianca Lawson, American actress
- March 24 – Lake Bell, American actress, director and screenwriter
- March 25 – Lee Pace, American actor
- March 28 – Shakib Khan, Bangladeshi film actor, producer, singer, film organiser and media personalities
- March 29 – De'Angelo Wilson, American actor and rapper (d. 2008)
- March 30
  - Jose Pablo Cantillo, American actor
  - Pete Holmes, American comedian, actor, writer, producer and podcaster
- April 4
  - Bunko Kanazawa, Japanese actress
  - Heath Ledger, Australian actor (d. 2008)
  - Natasha Lyonne, American actress
- April 5 – Josh Boone, American filmmaker
- April 7 - Nico Santos, Filipino-American actor
- April 9 - Edward Bennett, English actor
- April 10 - Paul Fox, English actor
- April 11 – Josh Server, American actor
- April 12
  - Claire Danes, American actress
  - Jennifer Morrison, American actress, director and producer
  - Paul Nicholls, English actor
- April 15
  - Karen David, Canadian actress and singer-songwriter
  - Luke Evans, Welsh actor and singer
- April 17
  - Mylene Dinh-Robic, Canadian actress
  - Ken Duken, German actor and director
  - Tate Ellington, American actor
- April 19 – Kate Hudson, American actress
- April 21 – James McAvoy, Scottish actor
- April 23 – Jaime King, American actress
- April 26 – Klára Issová, Czech actress
- April 27 - Tom Davis, English actor and comedian
- May 5 – Vincent Kartheiser, American actor
- May 6 - Kerry Ellis, English actress and singer
- May 7 – Yōsuke Kubozuka, Japanese actor
- May 9 – Rosario Dawson, American actress
- May 11 - Mary Elizabeth Ellis, American actress
- May 12 – Aaron Yoo, Korean-American actor
- May 17 - Lyne Renée, Belgian actress
- May 19 - Bérénice Marlohe, French actress
- May 20 - Jana Pallaske, German actress and singer
- May 21 - Lino Guanciale, Italian actor
- May 22 – Maggie Q, American actress
- May 23 – Josh Cooley, American animator, screenwriter, director and voice actor
- May 24 - Panos Mouzourakis, Greek singer-songwriter and actor
- May 25 - Corbin Allred, American actor
- May 28
  - Jesse Bradford, American actor
  - Monica Keena, American actress
- May 30
  - Jenny Mollen, American actress and writer
  - Tadhg Murphy, Irish actor
- June 2
  - Morena Baccarin, Brazilian actress
  - James Ransone, American actor (d. 2025)
- June 7 – Anna Torv, Australian actress
- June 12 - Wil Horneff, American former child actor
- June 17 – Young Maylay, American rapper, producer and voice actor
- June 20 - Sarah Stiles, American singer and actress
- June 21 – Chris Pratt, American actor
- June 24 – Mindy Kaling, American writer and actress
- June 25
  - Hong Chau, American actress
  - Busy Philipps, American actress
- June 27
  - Martin Bourboulon, French film director and screenwriter
  - Benjamin Speed, Australian film composer
- June 28 - Elaine Tan, English actress
- June 30 - Rick Gonzalez, American actor and musician
- July 3 – Ludivine Sagnier, French actress
- July 5 – Eva Maria Daniels, Icelandic film producer (d. 2023)
- July 6
  - Kevin Hart, American actor
  - Abdul Salis, British actor
- July 7 - Benjamin Mitchell, New Zealand actor
- July 10 – Gong Yoo, South Korean actor
- July 12 – Omid Abtahi, Iranian-American actor
- July 14 – Scott Porter, American actor
- July 16
  - Jayma Mays, American actress
  - Gerard Monaco, British actor
- July 17 – Mike Vogel, American actor and former model
- July 19 – David Sakurai, Danish-Japanese actor, director and scriptwriter
- July 24 - Rose Byrne, Australian actress
- July 25 - Juan Pablo Di Pace, Argentine actor, director, singer and musician
- July 26 - Mageina Tovah, American actress
- July 30
  - Lucas Babin, American actor
  - Derek Waters, American actor, comedian, screenwriter, producer and director
- July 31
  - Dana Gourrier, American actress
  - B. J. Novak, American writer and actor
- August 1 – Jason Momoa, American actor and filmmaker
- August 3 – Evangeline Lilly, Canadian actress
- August 6 – Dayahang Rai, Nepalese actor
- August 10 – JoAnna Garcia Swisher, American actress
- August 12 - Keith Powell, American actor, writer and director
- August 13 - Kasia Smutniak, Polish-Italian actress and model
- August 14 - Jamie Parker, English actor and singer
- August 21 - Kevin Janssens, Belgian actor
- August 22 – Brandon Adams, American actor
- August 23 – Claire Grant, American actress, model and producer
- August 24 – Fabienne Carat, French actress and singer
- August 25 – Şebnem Bozoklu, Turkish actress
- August 26 – Erik Valdez, American actor
- August 27 – Aaron Paul, American actor
- August 28 - Melody Kay, American actress
- August 29 – Dan Harris, American screenwriter and director
- August 31 – Yuvan Shankar Raja, Indian film composer
- September 1
  - Camille Chen, American actress
  - Justice Leak, American actor
- September 4 - Max Greenfield, American actor
- September 8
  - Miles Jupp, English actor and comedian
  - Pink, American singer and actress
- September 11
  - Ariana Richards, American actress
  - Cameron Richardson, American actress and producer
  - Hu Ting-ting, English-born Taiwanese actress
- September 17
  - Neill Blomkamp, South African and Canadian director and screenwriter
  - Kat Coiro, American director
  - Billy Miller, American actor (d. 2023)
- September 18 – Alison Lohman, American former actress
- September 19 – Noémie Lenoir, French model and actress
- September 20 – Chris Tardio, American actor
- September 22 – MyAnna Buring, Swedish-born British actress
- September 23 – Lisa Loven Kongsli, Norwegian actress
- September 25 - Stephen Rider, American actor
- September 26
  - Mark Famiglietti, American actor, screenwriter and producer
  - Susanne Wuest, Austrian actress
- September 27 – Jad Saxton, American voice actress
  - Alicyn Packard, American actress, singer, and writer
- September 30 – Jonathan Kasdan, American screenwriter, director, producer and actor
- October 1 – Marielle Heller, American film director
- October 4
  - Caitríona Balfe, Irish actress
  - Rachael Leigh Cook, American actress
- October 6 – Sareh Bayat, Iranian actress
- October 7
  - Tang Wei, Chinese actress
  - Aaron Ashmore and Shawn Ashmore, Canadian actors
- October 8 – Kristanna Loken, American actress
- October 9
  - Alex Greenwald, American musician and actor
  - Chris O'Dowd, Irish actor and comedian
  - Brandon Routh, American actor
  - Zachary Ty Bran, American actor
- October 20
  - Nargis Fakhri, American actress
  - John Krasinski, American actor and filmmaker
- October 22 - Tony Denman, American actor
- October 28 – Natina Reed, American singer-songwriter, rapper and actress (d. 2012)
- October 29 – Maya Karin, Malaysian actress
- October 30 - James A. Woods, Canadian actor
- October 31 – Erica Cerra, Canadian actress
- November 2 - Jon M. Chu, American director, producer and screenwriter
- November 5 - Leonardo Nam, Australian actor
- November 8 – Dania Ramirez, Dominican actress
- November 9
  - Cory Hardrict, American actor
  - Matt McCarthy, American comedian, actor and writer
- November 13 – Riccardo Scamarcio, Italian actor and producer
- November 14 – Olga Kurylenko, Ukrainian-French actress
- November 19 – Barry Jenkins, American film director
- November 20 - Jacob Pitts, American actor
- November 22
  - Andrew Knott, British actor
  - Leeanna Walsman, Australian actress
- November 23 – Jonathan Sadowski, American actor
- November 25
  - Jerry Ferrara, American actor
  - Joel Kinnaman, Swedish-American actor
- November 28 – Daniel Henney, American actor and model
- November 29 - Timo Vuorensola, Finnish director, singer and actor
- November 30
  - Stephen Campbell Moore, British actor
  - Fiona O'Shaughnessy, Irish actress
- December 3 – Tiffany Haddish, American comedian and actress
- December 5 – Nick Stahl, American actor
- December 7
  - Eric Bauza, Canadian-born American voice actor, stand-up comedian and animation artist (d. 2026)
  - Sara Bareilles, American actress and singer
- December 8 - Nick Thune, American actor, comedian and musician
- December 11 – Rider Strong, American actor
- December 15 – Adam Brody, American actor, writer, musician and producer
- December 17 - Lil Rel Howery, American actor and comedian
- December 19 - Tara Summers, English actress
- December 20 - Ramón Rodríguez, Puerto Rican actor
- December 21 - Daniel Brocklebank, British actor
- December 23 – Summer Altice, American model and actress
- December 24 - Natalie Walter, British actress and writer
- December 26 – Chris Daughtry, American actor and singer
- December 28
  - André Holland, American actor
  - Noomi Rapace, Swedish actress
- December 29 – Diego Luna, Mexican actor, director and producer

== Deaths ==
Month
Date
Name
Age
Country
Profession
Notable films
January
11
Jack Soo
61
US
Actor
- Flower Drum Song
- The Oscar
16
Peter Butterworth
63
UK
Actor, writer
- Oliver!
- The First Great Train Robbery
16
Ted Cassidy
46
US
Actor
- Butch Cassidy and the Sundance Kid
- Mackenna's Gold
18
Cyril J. Mockridge
82
UK
Composer
- Desk Set
- The Man Who Shot Liberty Valance
25
Dick Crockett
63
US
Stuntman, Actor
- Dirty Harry
- Spartacus
February
12
Jean Renoir
84
US
Director, writer, actor
- The Rules of the Game
- La Grande Illusion
16
Louise Allbritton
58
US
Actress
- Pittsburgh
- Sitting Pretty
17
William Gargan
73
US
Actor
- The Bells of St. Mary's
- Cheers for Miss Bishop
19
Leigh Jason
74
US
Director
- Out of the Blue
- The Mad Miss Manton
28
Jane Hylton
51
UK
Actress
- It Started in Paradise
- Circus of Horrors
March
1
Dolores Costello
75
US
Actress
- The Magnificent Ambersons
- Little Lord Fauntleroy
2
Edith Craig
71
US
Actress
- After the Thin Man
- Broadway Bill
6
John Robinson
70
UK
Actor
- Lawrence of Arabia
- The Longest Day
9
Barbara Mullen
64
UK
Actress
- Jeannie
- Thunder Rock
19
John Tate
64
UK
Actor
Invasion
21
Bomba Tzur
50
Israel
Actor
- Blaumilch Canal
- Dalia and the Sailors
22
Ben Lyon
78
US
Actor, writer
- Hell's Angels
- Night Nurse
24
Yvonne Mitchell
63
UK
Actress
- Woman in a Dressing Gown
- Johnny Nobody
April
4
Edgar Buchanan
76
US
Actor
- Shane
- Wichita
6
Norman Tokar
59
US
Director
- Follow Me, Boys!
- The Happiest Millionaire
10
Nino Rota
67
Italy
Composer
- The Godfather
- The Leopard
24
John Carroll
72
US
Actor
- Go West
- Flying Tigers
May
6
Rosemary La Planche
55
US
Actress
- Angels' Alley
- Jack Armstrong
8
Victor Saville
83
UK
Producer, director
- Goodbye, Mr. Chips
- Kim
10
Beatrice Campbell
56
UK
Actress
- Last Holiday
- The Master of Ballantrae
11
Joan Chandler
55
US
Actress
- Humoresque
- Rope
26
George Brent
80
US
Actor
- Jezebel
- 42nd Street
29
Mary Pickford
87
US
Actress, producer, writer
- Ben-Hur: A Tale of the Christ
- Coquette
June
1
Jack Mulhall
91
US
Actor
- The Social Buccaneer
- The Three Musketeers
2
Larisa Shepitko
41
Soviet Union
Director
- Wings
- The Ascent
2
Jim Hutton
45
US
Actor
- Walk, Don't Run
- Who's Minding the Mint?
6
Jack Haley
80
US
Actor
- The Wizard of Oz
- Alexander's Ragtime Band
11
John Wayne
72
US
Actor, producer, director
- The Searchers
- Red River
12
Henry Berman
65
US
Editor, Producer
- Swing Time
- Grand Prix
14
David Butler
84
US
Director
- Road to Morocco
- Calamity Jane
16
Nicholas Ray
67
US
Director, writer, actor
- Rebel Without a Cause
- In a Lonely Place
19
Nick Grinde
86
US
Director
- Million Dollar Legs
- The Man They Could Not Hang
21
Julian Orchard
49
UK
Actor, writer
- Revenge of the Pink Panther
- The Adventure of Sherlock Holmes' Smarter Brother
July
2
Larisa Shepitko
41
USSR
Director, writer, actress
- The Ascent
- Farewell
8
Michael Wilding
66
UK
Actor, producer
- Stage Fright
- Waterloo
13
Corinne Griffith
84
US
Actress
- The Divine Lady
- Back Pay
22
Kathleen Case
45
US
Actress
- Human Desire
- Running Wild
25
Eric Pohlmann
66
Germany
Actor
- The Third Man
- From Russia with Love
26
Virginia Brissac
96
US
Actress
- Dressed to Kill
- Rebel Without a Cause
27
Ettore Manni
52
Italy
Actor
- City of Women
- Le Amiche
27
Shirley Mason
79
US
Actress
- Anne Against the World
- So This Is Love?
28
George Seaton
68
US
Director
- The Country Girl
- Airport
28
Frederick Stafford
51
Czechoslovakia
Actor
- Topaz
- Dirty Heroes
31
Beatrix Lehmann
76
UK
Actress
The Spy Who Came in from the Cold
August
??
Betty Henderson
72
UK
Actress
- The 39 Steps
- The Maggie
6
Kurt Kasznar
65
Austria
Actor
- Kiss Me Kate
- Lili
7
Vicente Salumbides
85
Philippines
Actor, Director
- Ibong Adarna
- Florante at Laura
10
Dick Foran
69
US
Actor
- The Petrified Forest
- Ride 'Em Cowboy
17
Vivian Vance
70
US
Actress
- The Great Race
21
Stuart Heisler
82
US
Director
- Tulsa
- I Died a Thousand Times
30
Jean Seberg
40
US
Actress
- Breathless
- Airport
September
1
Doris Kenyon
81
US
Actress
- Alexander Hamilton
- The Road to Singapore
2
Felix Aylmer
90
UK
Actor
- Becket
- Hamlet
12
Les Clark
71
US
Animator
- Fantasia
- One Hundred and One Dalmatians
12
Jocelyne LaGarde
54
Tahiti
Actress
Hawaii
17
Willis Goldbeck
80
US
Screenwriter
- Young Dr. Kildare
- The Man Who Shot Liberty Valance
22
Frederick Piper
76
UK
Actor
- The 39 Steps
- The Man Who Knew Too Much
23
Catherine Lacey
75
UK
Actress
- The Lady Vanishes
- The Private Life of Sherlock Holmes
26
John Cromwell
91
US
Director
- Of Human Bondage
- The Enchanted Cottage
26
Arthur Hunnicutt
69
US
Actor
- The Tall T
- El Dorado
27
Gracie Fields
81
UK
Actress, singer
- Sally in Our Alley
- Holy Matrimony
October
1
Dorothy Arzner
82
US
Director
- Craig's Wife
- Dance, Girl, Dance
3
Dorothy Peterson
81
US
Actress
- That Hagen Girl
- Payment Deferred
12
Celia Lovsky
82
Austria
Actress
- Foxfire
- I Mobster
17
John Stuart
81
UK
Actor
- Superman
- Village of the Damned
25
Fernando Soler
83
Mexico
Actor
- Papacito lindo
- El gran calavera
30
Graham Ashley
52
UK
Actor
- Star Wars Episode IV: A New Hope
- Hennessy
November
1
Saro Urzì
66
Italy
Actor
- The Godfather
- Beat the Devil
5
Amedeo Nazzari
71
Italy
Actor
- Il bandito
- The Jester's Supper
8
Sydney Tafler
63
UK
Actor
- The Spy Who Loved Me
- Alfie
11
Dimitri Tiomkin
85
Russia
Composer
- High Noon
- The High and the Mighty
20
Michael Darbyshire
62
UK
Actor, writer
- Chitty Chitty Bang Bang
- The Slipper and the Rose
21
Paul Wexler
50
US
Actor
- The Four Skulls of Jonathan Drake
- Doc Savage: The Man of Bronze
22
George Froeschel
88
US
Screenwriter
- Mrs. Miniver
- Scaramouche
23
Merle Oberon
68
India
Actress, producer
- Wuthering Heights
- The Scarlet Pimpernel
30
Barbara von Annenkoff
79
Germany
Actress
- Wood Love
- Derby
30
Joyce Grenfell
69
UK
Actress
- The Americanization of Emily
- Blue Murder at St Trinian's
30
Zeppo Marx
78
US
Actor, director
- Duck Soup
- Monkey Business
December
5
Jesse Pearson
49
US
Actor
Bye Bye Birdie
5
Lesley Selander
70
US
Director
- Blackmail
- Flight to Mars
9
James Neilson
70
US
Director
- The Moon-Spinners
- Bon Voyage!
10
Ann Dvorak
68
US
Actress
- Scarface
- Three on a Match
11
Claire Carleton
66
US
Actress
- Girl from Havana
- Gildersleeve on Broadway
12
Jon Hall
64
US
Actor, director
- The Hurricane
- Kit Carson
22
George Pollock
72
UK
Director
- Murder, She Said
- Ten Little Indians
23
Ernest B. Schoedsack
86
US
Director, cinematographer, producer
- King Kong
- The Most Dangerous Game
25
Michael Collins
57
Canada
Actor
- Goldfinger
- The Battle of the River Plate
25
Lee Bowman
64
US
Actor
- Love Affair
- Cover Girl
25
Joan Blondell
73
US
Actress
- Grease
- The Public Enemy

== Film debuts ==
- Sam Anderson – The Swap
- Rosanna Arquette – More American Graffiti
- Jean-Pierre Bacri – The Medic
- G. W. Bailey – A Force of One
- Talia Balsam – Sunnyside
- Tobin Bell – Manhattan
- Lorraine Bracco – Duos sur canapé
- David Bradley – The Frisco Kid
- Patrick Bruel – Le coup de sirocco
- Grand L. Bush – Hair
- Yancy Butler – Savage Weekend
- Gordon Clapp – Running
- Frances Conroy – Manhattan
- Matt Craven – Meatballs
- Denise Crosby – 10
- Ted Danson – The Onion Field
- Jean-Pierre Darroussin – Coup de tête
- Keith David – Disco Godfather
- David DeLuise – Hot Stuff
- Matt Dillon – Over the Edge
- Lisa Eichhorn – The Europeans
- Cary Elwes – Yesterday's Hero
- Giancarlo Esposito – Running
- Craig Fairbrass – Scum
- Christopher Fairbank – Agatha
- Jim Fitzpatrick – Glory Days
- Danny Glover – Escape from Alcatraz
- Erin Gray – Buck Rogers in the 25th Century
- Bruce Greenwood – Bear Island
- Linda Hamilton – Night Flowers
- Melora Hardin – The North Avenue Irregulars
- Dennis Haysbert – Scoring
- Stephen McKinley Henderson – A Pleasure Doing Business
- James Horner (film composer) – The Lady in Red
- Anna Maria Horsford – An Almost Perfect Affair
- Gary Hudson – Skatetown, U.S.A.
- Hawthorne James – Disco Godfather
- Lucinda Jenney – Impostors
- Michael Jeter – Hair
- Sam J. Jones – 10
- David Keith – The Great Santini
- David Patrick Kelly – The Warriors
- Wayne Knight – The Wanderers
- Christine Lahti – ...And Justice for All
- Laurene Landon – Bitter Heritage
- Diane Lane – A Little Romance
- Fredric Lehne – Being There
- Eugene Lipinski – Hanover Street
- Carl Lumbly – Escape from Alcatraz
- Tzi Ma – Cocaine Cowboys
- Hayao Miyazaki (director) – The Castle of Cagliostro
- Bill Nighy – The Bitch
- Will Patton – Minus Zero
- David Paymer – The In-Laws
- Elizabeth Peña – El Super
- Chris Penn – Charlie and the Talking Buzzard
- Rhea Perlman – Swap Meet
- Clarke Peters – The Music Machine
- CCH Pounder – All That Jazz
- Mickey Rourke – 1941
- Zelda Rubinstein – Americathon
- Jay O. Sanders – Starting Over
- Al Sapienza – Nocturna: Granddaughter of Dracula
- Raynor Scheine – Something Short of Paradise
- Wallace Shawn – Manhattan
- Martin Short – Lost and Found
- J. Smith-Cameron – Gal Young Un
- Timothy Spall – Quadrophenia
- Vincent Spano – Over the Edge
- Mike Starr – Squeeze Play!
- Daniel Stern – Breaking Away
- Ewan Stewart – That Summer!
- Emma Suárez – Memoirs of Leticia Valle
- Patrick Swayze – Skatetown, U.S.A.
- R. H. Thomson – Jigsaw
- Joey Travolta – Sunnyside
- Jean-Claude Van Damme – Woman Between Wolf and Dog
- Christoph Waltz – Breakthrough
- Timothy Webber – The Prize Fighter
- Peter Weller – Butch and Sundance: The Early Days
- Joanne Whalley – Birth of the Beatles
- JoBeth Williams – Kramer vs. Kramer
- Mykelti Williamson – Sunnyside
- Michael Wincott – Title Shot
- Ray Winstone – That Summer!
- Michael Wright – The Wanderers
- Daniel Zacapa – Boulevard Nights
