= Yarkon Cemetery =

Cemetery in Israel

Coordinates: 32°06′56″N 34°52′12″E

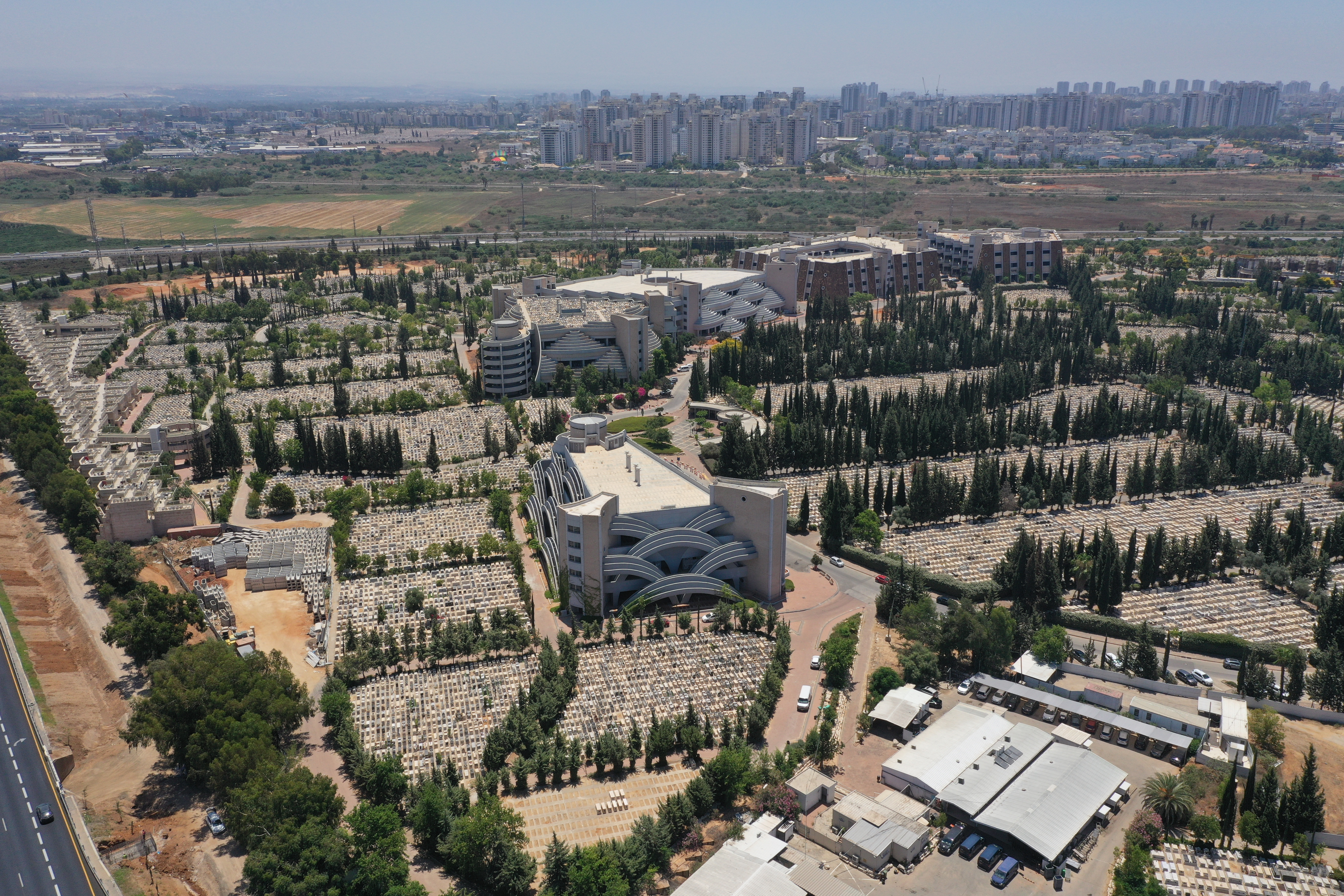
Yarkon Cemetery in 2023

Yarkon Cemetery (Hebrew: בית העלמין ירקון) is the main cemetery for the Tel Aviv Metropolitan Area of Israel. It is located within the Petah Tikva city limits, between the Yarkon River in the West, Highway 5 in the North, and the 491 road from East and South.

== History ==
The need to establish the cemetery was driven by crowding in the Southern Cemetery in Bat Yam. A number of locations were considered, including the area north of Ramat Aviv. The eventual location was preferred for being relatively far from the center of Tel Aviv. The cemetery was opened by chief rabbis Hayim David HaLevi and Israel Meir Lau in 1991.

Yarkon Cemetery is now the only cemetery in the Dan Region where plots are available free of charge, serving Tel Aviv, Ramat Gan, Holon, Bat Yam, Kiryat Ono and other cities in the center of the country. An elliptical road surrounds the central part, giving access to the cemetery and parking areas by traffic and buses. There are three memorial halls close to the road. One of the problems of the cemetery is the rising water level of the Yarkon River during rainy winters.

With the traditional burial grounds at near capacity, with 110,000 graves across 150 acres, a series of 30 vertical structures are under construction that will provide space for 250,000 more graves.

== Notable interred ==
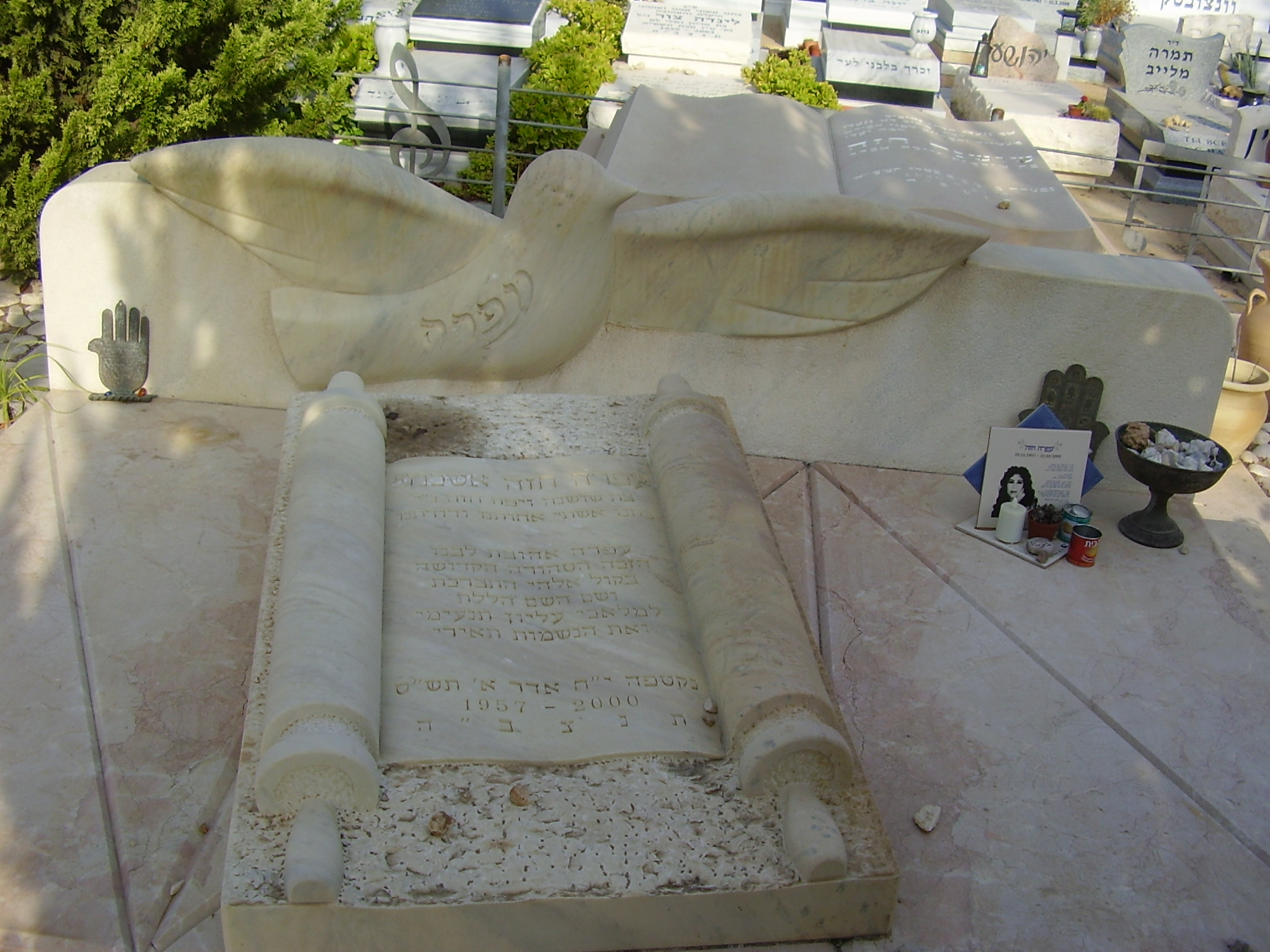
Ofra Haza's grave

- David Avidan (1934–1995), Israeli poet
- Shosh Atari (1949–2008), Israeli radio personality
- Yona Atari (1933–2019), Israeli singer and actress
- Sasha Argov (1914–1995), Israeli composer
- Mia Arbatova (1911–1990), Israeli ballet dancer
- Shlomo Aronson (1936–2020), Israeli historian
- Yardena Alotin (1930–1994), Israeli composer and pianist
- Avraham Bendori (1928–2019), Israeli footballer
- Debbi Besserglick (1955–2005), Israeli actress
- Menachem Banitt (1914–2007), Belgian-Israeli scholar
- Avraham Biton (1923–2005), Israeli politician
- Rafael Bash (1913–2000), Israeli politician
- Rozina Cambos (1951–2012), Israeli actress
- Shlomo Cohen-Tzidon (1923–2012), Israeli politician
- Gamliel Cohen (1922–2002), Israeli intelligence officer
- Tzila Dagan (1946-2004), Israeli singer
- Sarah Doron (1922–2010), Israeli politician
- Shimon Even (1935–2004), Israeli researcher
- Nissim Eliad (1919–2014), Israeli politician
- Shmuel Gogol (1924–1993), Israeli musician
- Kariel Gardosh (1921–2000), Israeli cartoonist
- Gila Goldstein (1947–2017), Israeli actress and activist
- Ofra Haza (1957–2000), Israeli singer
- Isser Harel (1912–2003), Israeli intelligence officer
- Uzi Hitman (1952–2004), Israeli singer
- Amir Kertes (1964–2018), Israeli singer
- Shmuel Katz (1914–2008), Israeli politician and journalist
- Shmulik Kraus (1935–2013), Israeli singer-songwriter
- Sara Hestrin-Lerner (1918–2017), Israeli physiologist
- Amos Lavi (1953–2010), Israeli actor
- Arik Lavie (1927–2004), Israeli singer and actor
- Sara Levi-Tanai (1910–2005), Israeli choreographer
- Esther Lurie (1913–1998), Israeli painter
- Mordechai Mishani (1945–2013), Israeli politician
- Aryeh Moskona (1947–2025), Israeli actor and singer
- Yigal Mossinson (1917–1994), Israeli playwright
- Dov Milman (1919–2007), Israeli politician
- George Ovadiah (1925–1996), Israeli film director
- Yigal Cohen-Orgad (1937–2019), Israeli politician
- Edward Olearczyk (1915–1994), Polish-Israeli composer
- Avner Shaki (1926–2005), Israeli politician
- Shin Shifra (1931–2012), Israeli poet
- Reuven Shefer (1925–2011), Israeli actor
- Gideon Singer (1926–2015), Israeli actor and singer
- Mordecai Seter (1916–1994), Israeli composer
- Pnina Salzman (1922–2006), Israeli pianist
- Yehuda Sha'ari (1920–1997), Israeli politician
- Dudu Topaz (1946–2009), Israeli television presenter
- Meir Vilner (1918–2003), Israeli politician
- Mordechai Virshubski (1930–2012), Israeli politician
- Yemanu Binyamin Zelka, Ethiopian-Israeli killed in April 2026
- Yehoshua Zettler (1917–2009), Israeli Lehi commander
- Yigal Shilon (1946–2024), Israeli television producer, screenwriter, director, and host
