= Amir Kertes =

Israeli musician and singer

Amir Kertes אמיר קרטס
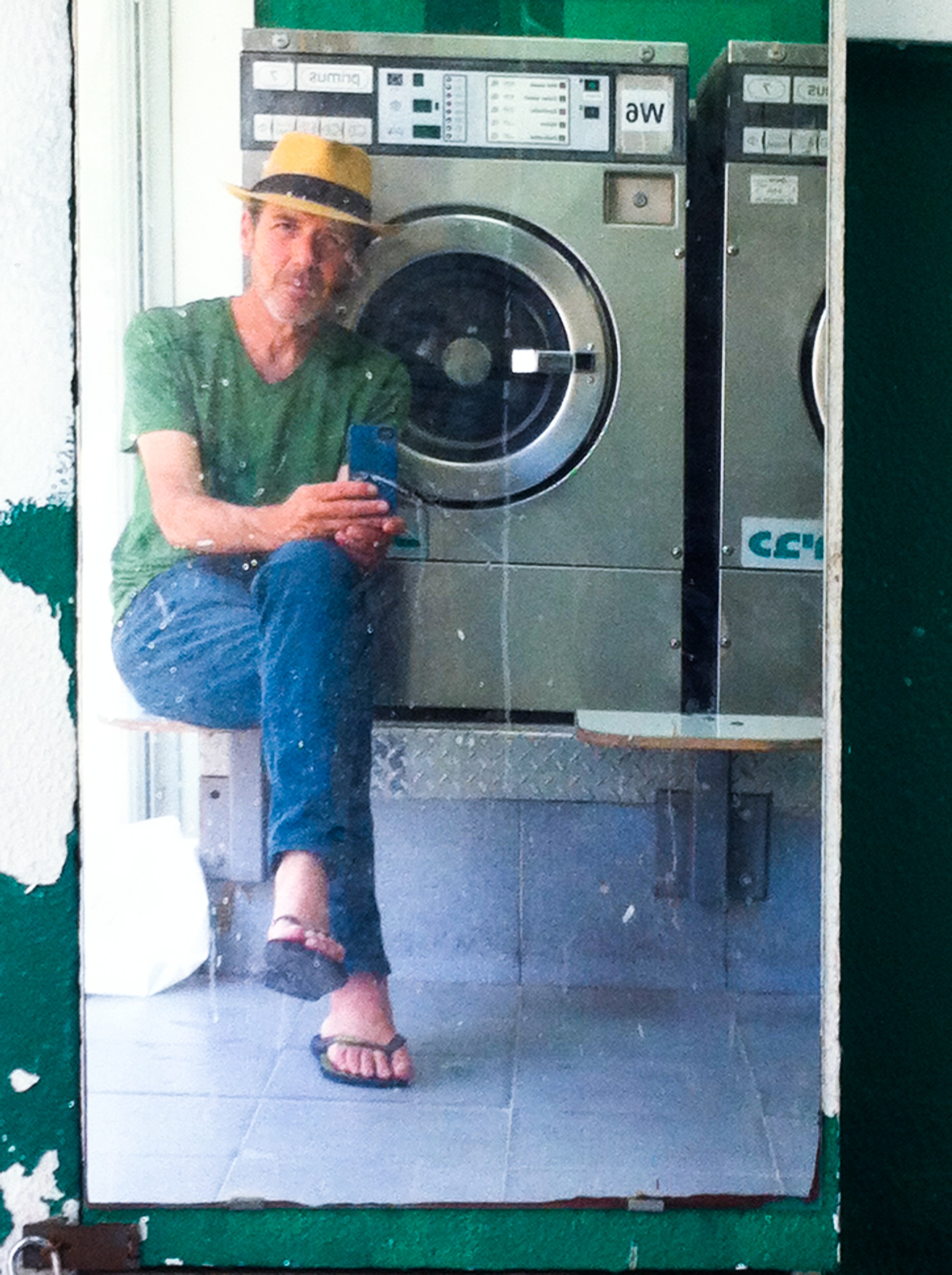

Background information
- Born: April 1964; Israel
- Died: 1 January 2018 (aged 53) Israel
- Genres: Rock
- Occupations: Singer-songwriter, musician
- Instrument: Vocals
- Years active: 1991–2018

Amir Kertes (Hebrew: אמיר קרטס; April 1964 – 1 January 2018) was an Israeli musician and singer.

== Biography ==
Kertes is the lead singer and songwriter of the rock band Ra'ash (רעש). Ra'ash released their debut album Noise Only Noise. N. (רעש רק רעש. ק.) in 1994 to critical acclaim. Kertes wrote and sang most of the songs on the album, although the songs that were written and sung by the second singer Jonnie Shualy gained more popularity.

In 1995 Kertes and all of the members of Ra'ash participated in recording of Shualy's first solo album The Thousand and One (האלף ואחד).

In 1996 Ra'ash released their second album, "Tmimot" (תמימות). All of the album was written and sung by Kertes. The group appeared on the TV and two songs received limited TV and radio play, but the sales were low. In the same year Kertes played in an album by the popular Israeli singer Yael Levi, which Shualy produced.

At that time Kertes moved from Tel-Aviv to Ezuz, a small moshav in the Negev desert.

In 1998 all members of Ra'ash played on the debut album of Adi Ran (עדי רן), a baal teshuva. The album became popular mostly in the Jewish religious communities.

In 2000 Ra'ash released their last album as a band, Ani Ze Lo' Ata (אני זה לא אתה). Singing and songwriting on this record were roughly divided between Kertes and Shualy. The album received positive reviews, but the band went on an indefinite hiatus shortly after its release.

In 2001 Ra'ash played their last show as a band at a two-day festival of Nana Disc artists.

In 2003 Kertes released his first solo album, Yellow Sea (ים צהוב).

== Death ==
On January 1, 2018, Kertes died at the age of 53 from lung cancer. He was interred at Yarkon Cemetery.
