= Gideon Singer =

Israeli actor (1926–2015)

- גדעון זינגר
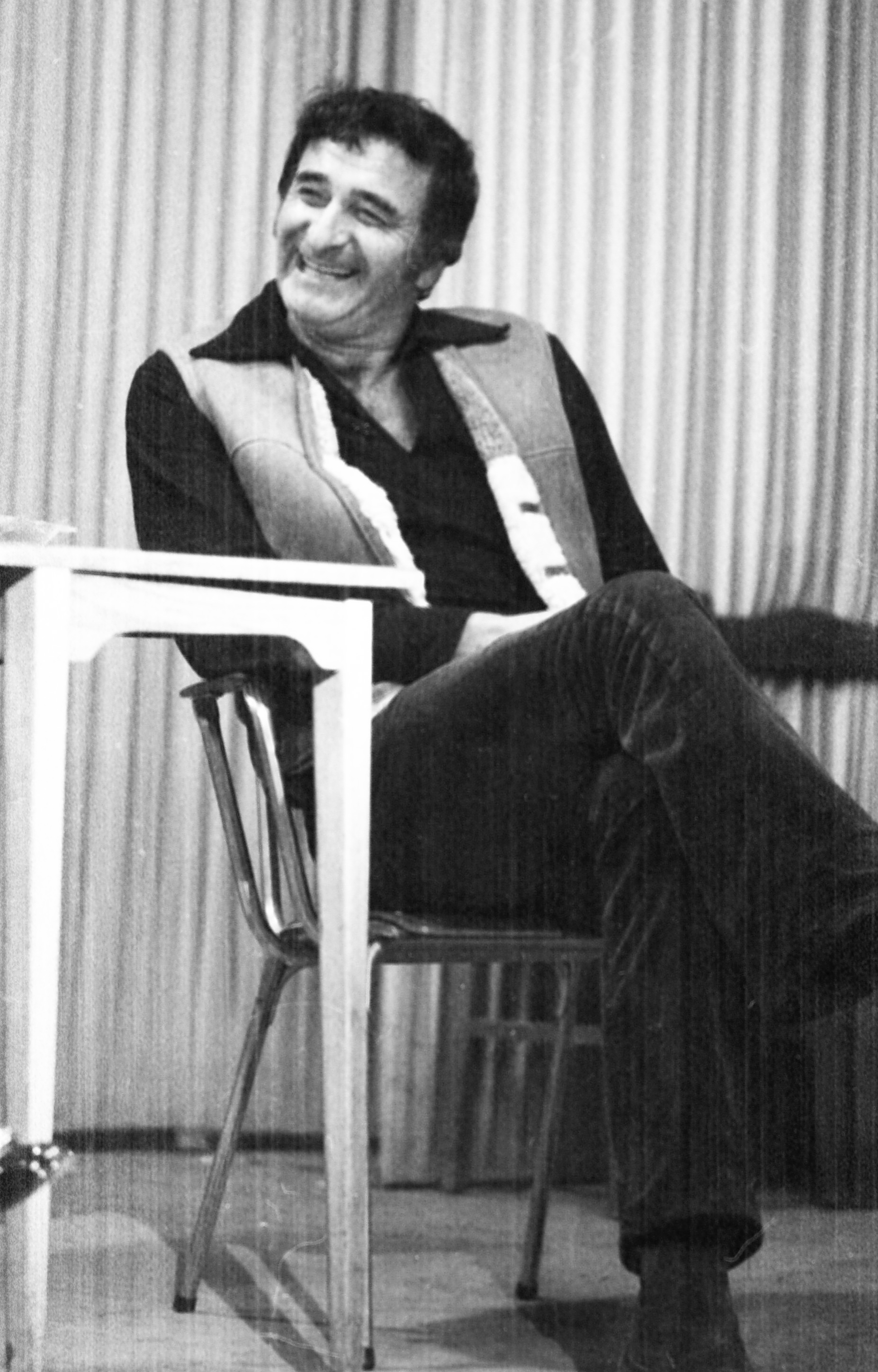
- Singer performing on stage in 1973
- Born: Harry Singer; 29 June 1926; Brno, Czechoslovakia
- Died: 11 May 2015 (aged 88); Tel Aviv, Israel
- Occupations: Actor; singer
- Years active: 1949–2015
- Children: 4

Gideon Singer (Hebrew: גדעון זינגר; 29 June 1926 – 11 May 2015) was an Israeli actor and singer.

== Biography ==
Born in Brno, Singer emigrated with his family from Czechoslovakia to Israel in 1940 and he was a survivor of the Patria shipwreck. Singer lived in Tel Aviv where he started singing as well as learning to play the violin and he also worked as a diamond polisher during his youth. After passing adolescence, Singer served in the Palmach where he also participated in the Chizbatron mainly during the late 1940s and early 1950s and he was also a member of a satire singing group along with Yaakov Ben-Sira, Shimon Bar and Reuven Shefer.

After appearing twice in the Israel Song Festival, Singer appeared frequently at the Habima Theatre, the Cameri Theatre and the Beersheba Theatre and appeared in stage adaptations of The Threepenny Opera, Twelfth Night and numerous musical productions. His success on-stage led him to star in European and Broadway theatre productions as well. On films, Singer had notable roles in One Pound Only, I Like Mike and Blaumilch Canal. His television appearances include Delet Haksamim and he was the Hebrew voice of Mr. Owl in Fabeltjeskrant.

In 1983, following his dismissal from the Habima Theatre, Singer moved to Austria and had lived in Vienna since 1987. He found professional opportunities on stage and screen and he heavily contributed to the Theater in der Josefstadt. He made his international cameo appearance in the 2015 film Woman in Gold. This was his final film before his death. Singer returned to Israel occasionally. His most notable visit was during his 80th birthday.

=== Personal life ===
Singer was married twice. From his first marriage, he had four children. His son, Joel is a lawyer who served as a legal adviser to the Israeli Foreign Minister during the Oslo Accords. He married Shira Singer ten years before his death.

== Death ==
On 11 May 2015, at the age of 88, Singer died at Ichilov Hospital due to complications from heart surgery he had prior to leaving Austria. He was buried at Yarkon Cemetery.

== Partial filmography ==
- I Like Mike (1961) - Benjamin Arieli
- Rak Ba'Lira (1963)
- Sallah Shabati (1964)
- Dalia And The Sailors (1964) - Vice Captain
- Moishe Ventilator (1966)
- Haminiyah Leretzach (1966)
- Hu Halach B'Sadot (1967)
- Ha-Shehuna Shelanu (1968)
- The Battle of Sinai (1968) - Egyptian Colonel (uncredited)
- Blaumilch Canal (1969) - Police Chief Akiva Levkowicz
- Shod Hatelephonim Hagadol (1972)
- Nahtche V'Hageneral (1972)
- Ha-Glula (1972)
- Azit Hakalba Hatzanhanit (1972) - Dr. Haruvi
- HaSandlar HaAliz (1973)
- Ha-Balash Ha'Amitz Shvartz (1973)
- Abu el Banat (1973) - Dr. Mazor
- Rak Hayom (1976) - Doctor Lapid
- Another Shadow (1976)
- Millioner Betzarot (1978) - Gila's Father
- The Fox in the Chicken Coop (1978) - Prof. Tennebaum / Elifaz hermanovitch
- Imi Hageneralit (1979)
- Ta'ut Bamispar (1979) - Hotel Manager
- Lo La'alot Yoter (1979) - Dr. Singer
- Transit (1980)
- Firefox (1982) - KGB agent (uncredited)
- Santa Fe (1986) - Popper
- Trostgasse 7 - eine Kindheit in Wien 1934-1938 (1988) - Herr Kohn
- Hund und Katz (1991) - Pogosz
- Gospel According to Harry (1994) - Jerry
- Ha-Gamal Hame'ofef (1994) - Professor Bauman
- Jailbirds (1996) - Opa Steinbock
- Der Bockerer 2 (1996) - Beamter im Paßamt
- Der Bockerer III - Die Brücke von Andau (2000) - Pfalzners assistant
- Woman in Gold (2015) - Restitution witness
