= Charlie and a Half =

- Directed by: Boaz Davidson
- Screenplay by: Eli Tavor
- Produced by: Simcha Zaguloni
- Starring: Yehuda Barkan; Ze'ev Revach; David Shushan; Arieh Elias
- Cinematography: Amnon Salomon
- Edited by: Alan Yakubovich
- Music by: Yair Rosenblum
- Production company: Filmor
- Release date: 1 September 1974 (Israel)
- Running time: 96 minutes
- Country: Israel
- Language: Hebrew
- Budget: ILP800,000 ($178,000–190,000)
- Box office: $698,000 (Israel)

Charlie and a Half (Hebrew: צ'רלי וחצי, romanized: Charlie Ve'Hetzi) is a 1974 Israeli comedy bourekas film directed by Boaz Davidson and produced by the Filmor company. The film stars Yehuda Barkan as Charlie, a charming but unscrupulous con artist from a working-class Tel Aviv neighborhood, and David Shushan as Miko, a streetwise orphan who helps Charlie run his schemes. The story follows Charlie's romantic pursuit of Gila played by Haya Katzir, a wealthy North Tel Aviv woman.

Charlie and a Half was influenced by the Iranian Luti genre and written by journalist Eli Tavor. Its soundtrack, composed by Yair Rosenblum with lyrics by Yonatan Gefen, featured songs that later became classics. Despite receiving mixed reviews at the time, particularly from critics opposed to so-called "ethnic films," it became a commercial success and has since become a cult classic.

== Plot ==
Charlie Ben-Hanania (Yehuda Barkan) is a con artist from a poor neighborhood, making a living through scams and running illegal gambling operations, assisted by Miko (David Shushan), an at-risk orphaned youth who lives in a shabby cabin with his older sister Lily (Geula Nuni), whose boyfriend is staying in the United States. Charlie falls in love with Gila Zohar (Haya Katzir), a beautiful blonde girl from a wealthy family in North Tel Aviv, whose parents try to set her up with Robert Diamenstein (Tuvia Tzafir), the nerdy son of Benjamin Diamenstein, one of Mr. Zohar's business partners abroad. She is disgusted by the spoiled American boy, who is mainly interested in classical music and golf, and instead feels a connection with Charlie. Charlie and Gila repeatedly find ways to evade Robert and spend time alone together.

Charlie tries to hide his real occupation and tells Gila that his father is a "beverage importer." His father, Zaki (Arieh Elias), is an alcoholic with a fondness for arak. Charlie is also engaged in power struggles with his rival Sasson Nagarin (Ze'ev Revach), who maintains a well-kept car and frequently sexually harasses Miko's sister. Sasson struggles to conceive a child with his wife (Nurit Cohen) and turns to Flora (Edna Fliedel), Charlie's mother, a fortune teller, for advice. She reads his coffee grounds and sees a tall creature—telling Sasson he must pluck hair from it to achieve salvation for himself and his wife. Sasson has a thuggish friend named Gedaliah (Moshe Ish-Kasit). The film is interspersed with encounters between Charlie and Sasson, sometimes with Gedaliah and sometimes without, where each gains the upper hand at different times. Two of the film's most humorous scenes take place in a restaurant, where the current victor forces his rival to eat an excessive variety of dishes together.

Gila accidentally encounters Charlie while he is running gambling games and realizes he has deceived her. She returns home upset and locks herself in her room. Charlie calls her, but she refuses to speak to him. At night, Miko arrives and convinces her that Charlie truly loves her, inviting her to come with him to Charlie's house. The two reconcile. Gila brings her parents to meet Charlie's parents. They pretend to cooperate but, of course, refuse to accept Charlie, the "chach-chach" (street-smart hustler), wondering what their daughter sees in this "wild man."

Meanwhile, Zaki interprets Flora's vision for Sasson: the tall creature is a giraffe. Sasson must pluck two hairs from its whiskers. Sasson does so, and his wife becomes pregnant. He comes to thank them. Lily also receives plane tickets from her boyfriend for herself and Miko to travel abroad. In the midst of the celebration, Charlie arrives and kisses Lily out of joy. Gila sees this, assumes he is cheating on her, and flees. Charlie chases her in Sasson's car, but during the pursuit, he swerves off the road, and the car plunges into a ravine.

Miko calls Gila, explaining what happened ("He's badly injured, they don't know what's wrong with him!"), and she rushes to the hospital. She enters Charlie's room, only to see a covered stretcher being wheeled out. "You came to see him? Too late. He's dead," an old man tells her. She bursts into tears and goes downstairs. As she walks down the hallway, she hears Charlie's voice—he is sitting in bed, playing cards with his roommates, completely fine except for a bandage on his head. She breaks into hysterical laughter.

The film ends at the airport, where Gila and Charlie—now married—bid farewell to Lily and Miko. Charlie kisses Lily again, and his goodbye scene with Miko is one of the film's highlights. Lily and Miko board the plane, while Charlie and his wife head off on their honeymoon.

== Cast ==
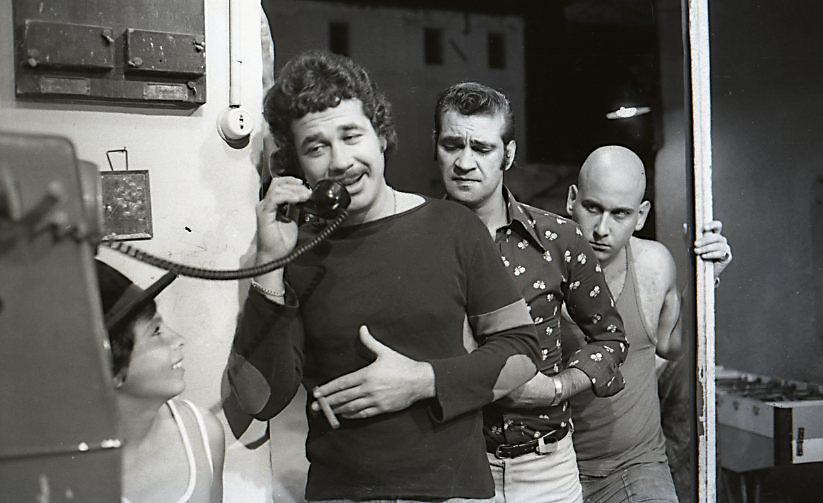
Ze'ev Revach, Yehuda Barkan, and Moshe Ish-Kasit during filming

- Yehuda Barkan as Charlie Ben-Hanania – A smooth-talking con artist from a poor neighborhood who falls in love with Gila, a wealthy girl from North Tel Aviv, while running illegal gambling schemes.
- Ze'ev Revach as Sasson Nagarin – Charlie's flashy rival, a wheeler-dealer obsessed with his car, who constantly harasses Miko's sister and struggles to have a child with his wife.
- Arieh Elias as Zaki Ben-Hanania – Charlie's alcoholic father, a lovable drunkard with a fondness for arak.
- Edna Flidel as Flora Ben-Hanania – Charlie's mother, a fortune teller who gives Sasson a bizarre prophecy involving a giraffe.
- Chaya Katzir as Gila Zohar – A beautiful, wealthy blonde from North Tel Aviv who rejects her parents' preferred suitor (Robert) for the street-smart Charlie.
- Geula Nuni as Lily – Miko's older sister, who lives in poverty but dreams of a better life abroad with her boyfriend.
- Elisheva Michaeli as Mrs. Zohar – Gila's snobbish mother, who disapproves of Charlie.
- Nathan Cogan as Chaim Zohar – Gila's wealthy father, a businessman who tries to arrange her marriage to Robert.
- Tuvia Tzafir as Robert Diamenstein – A nerdy, spoiled American suitor obsessed with classical music and golf, whom Gila despises.
- Moshe Ish-Kasit as Gedaliah – Sasson's brutish enforcer and friend.
- Reuven Shefer as Car Salesman – A minor but memorable role, likely involved in one of Charlie's schemes.
- Tikva Aziz as Mazal – Presumably a supporting character in the neighborhood (exact role unclear in the plot summary).
- Aryeh Moskona as Neighbor – A background character in Charlie's community.
- Mordechai Ben-Ze'ev as Erlich – Likely another local figure in Charlie's world.
- Nurit Cohen as Yafa – Sasson's long-suffering wife, who finally gets pregnant after his bizarre giraffe-hair quest.
- David Shushan as Miko – A streetwise orphan who helps Charlie with his scams and lives with his sister Lily; his emotional goodbye with Charlie is a key moment.

== Production ==
=== Background ===
The film was produced by the Filmor company, owned by the Zaboloni brothers. One of the brothers Simcha Zevuloni was born in Iran, grew up and was educated in Israel, and served in the IDF. Simcha Zaguloni worked with Moshe Sinai, and Yitzhak Yosipzon, who were co-producers of the film with a budget of 800,000 Israeli pounds. At the age of 24, he returned to Iran and joined the Cinafilm production company in Tehran, which was owned by his brother.

=== Writing and themes ===
The film was inspired by the "Luti" genre, which was at the height of its popularity in Iranian cinema in 1970s. In this genre, the protagonist—known as the Luti—is a rough-edged, working-class "tough guy" or streetwise delinquent who stands in sharp contrast to the Westernized–upper class. The typical storyline centers on a wealthy woman who falls in love with the Luti, setting the stage for a clash between two very different worlds. Zaboloni decided to bring this concept to Israeli cinema and enlisted journalist Eli Tavor to adapt the script for Israeli audiences. At the time, Tavor was a well-known journalist, and screenwriting was merely a side gig, saying "I didn’t invest too much in scripts, I would dedicate maybe two months a year to them. I used to write at night, after my work hours at the newspaper, when the kids were sleeping. The scripts were written pretty quickly, including the script for Charlie and a Half."

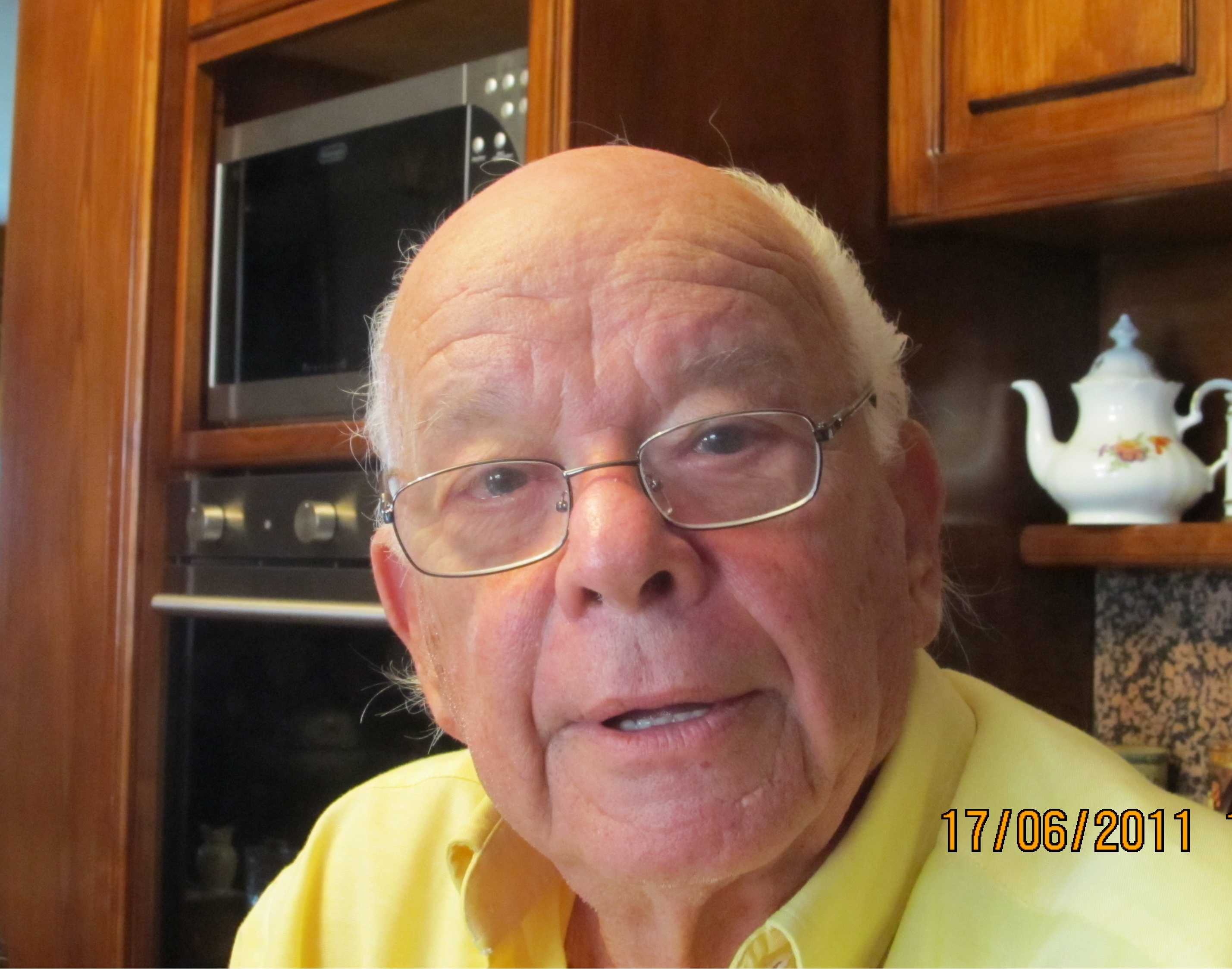
Scriptwriter Eli Tavor (d. 2011)

The title "Charlie and a Half" was chosen as a tribute to Lieutenant General Moshe Levi, who was famously nicknamed "Moishe and a Half" due to his towering height. The film touched on "social wounds that erupted in the 1970s" in Israeli society, both before and after its release. At the time, the Israeli Black Panthers were "shaking" the country and its leaders with their campaign against discrimination toward the Mizrahi community. Reportedly, public trust in the government had reached a "breaking point" following the Yom Kippur War, the perceived failures that led to it, and its aftermath. These tensions were present when Tavor wrote the script, which centered on a relationship between Charlie, a Mizrahi man, and Gila, an Ashkenazi woman. Charlie's warm and accepting parents contrast sharply with Gila's cold, elitist ones, who mock Charlie's background, describe him as a "savage," and attempt to marry her off to a wealthy, Ashkenazi, educated man of high social standing. Most of the characters in the film stereotypically portray members of the Mizrahi community as primitive idlers with limited vocabularies and broken Hebrew, yet endowed with "sharp street smarts"—traits that overpower the Ashkenazi characters, who are depicted as highly educated, financially wealthy, and speaking in an "elitist language which is tinged with disdain for those who don't hang out in their social circles." Tavor's portrayal of characters was shaped by people he encountered during his journalistic work, particularly in a project where he wrote short profiles of each of the 151 martyrs of Operation Kadesh, as well as by his own childhood experiences, where he grew up in East Tel Aviv, on a street with huts where Yemenite and Moroccan families lived. He credits them as a major influence and emphasized his support for the Wadi Salib rebellion.

“During those years, I worked as a journalist for the newspaper HaOlam HaZeh, and that’s where I acquired my social awareness—back when I covered the events of Wadi Salib and the Black Panthers. As part of my work, I interviewed and met people from various ethnic groups and studied them. We tried to bridge the ethnic gap. This was something that was on my mind and was reflected in the scripts I wrote. It was part of my agenda. I grew up in Tel Aviv with people from the Mizrahi community, and I loved their food more than my mother’s Ashkenazi cooking. In the film, the Mizrahim—the common people and the underprivileged—defeat the rich and arrogant Ashkenazim. I put the stories and characters I knew into the films. The audience saw themselves in Charlie and a Half and in the other Burekas films, and therefore they identified with them.”

— Eli Tavor reflecting on writing the script, via Maariv.

The idea for the film also stemmed from a request to adapt the premise of an unnamed "popular Iranian film." The original told the story of a man from the margins of society—a local delinquent—who falls in love with a wealthy woman. In a later interview with the Israeli Cinema Testimony Database, Yehuda Barkan who played Charlie recalled, "It was cross-fertilization. Many people don’t know, but Charlie and a Half didn’t have a full script. There was a basic idea that Tavor wrote, but 80% of the dialogue was improvised on location. We didn’t memorize lines the night before—we’d arrive on set in the morning, Boaz would hand us new lines he’d written on location, and we’d build the scenes through improvisation."

Zevuloni brothers brought in Boaz Davidson to direct. At the time, Davidson was a member of the “Lol” group, and a few years earlier had co-founded the "Hagar" production company with Arik Einstein and Zvi Shissel, with whom he also created Shablul (1970). However, when Uri Zohar joined the group, Davidson felt increasingly pushed aside, until he eventually chose to leave. Davidson recalled, "I needed the job, so I agreed [to direct Charlie and a Half]. At first, it took me some time to find my footing in this film. It was a bit challenging initially, but Eli and I kept rewriting and refining the script. This was the first film where I decided to simply be myself, rather than trying to be someone else."

Originally, the film was supposed to end with Miko, (Charlie's friend, played by David Shushan), staying in Israel and continuing his life with Charlie. However, during a staff screening at Herzliya Studios, a cleaning worker approached Davidson and told him the ending didn't do justice to the boy's character—that Miko deserved a better future than a life of petty schemes. Taking the comment to heart, Davidson changed the ending: Miko boards the plane, a tear rolling down his cheek.

=== Casting ===
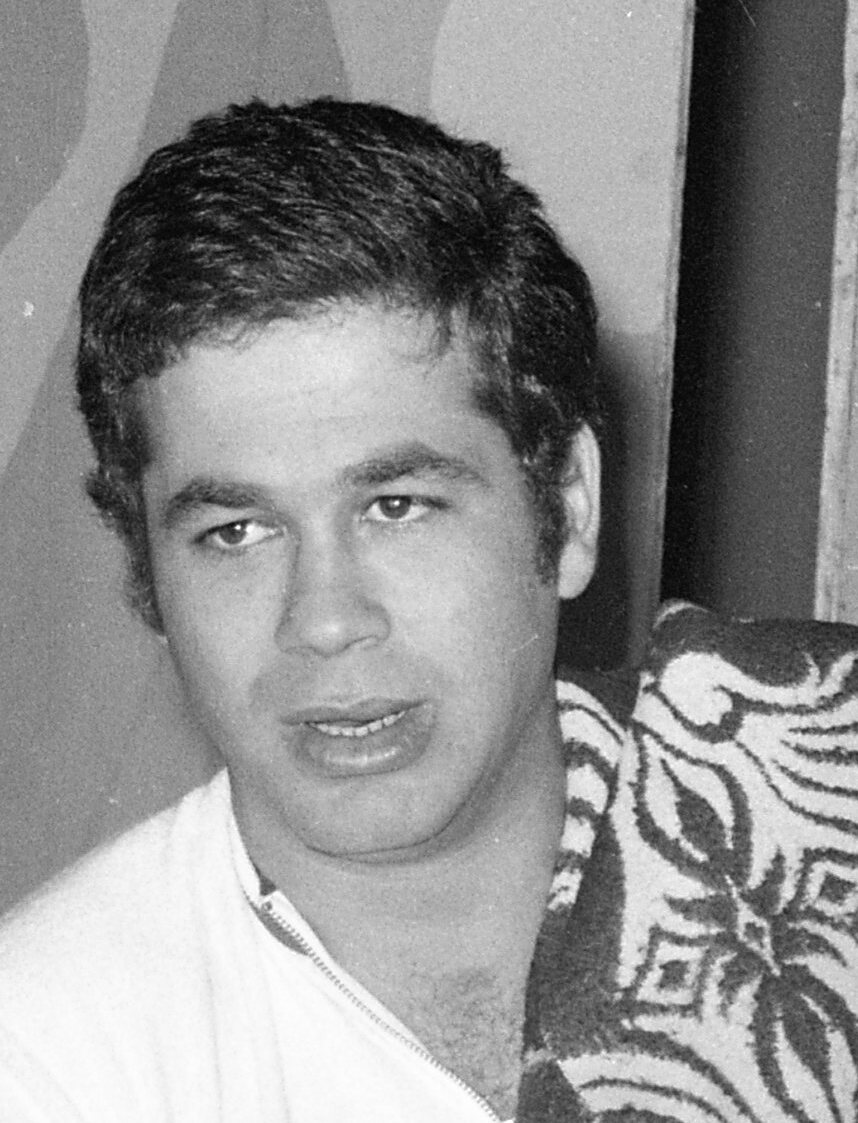
Barkan in 1969

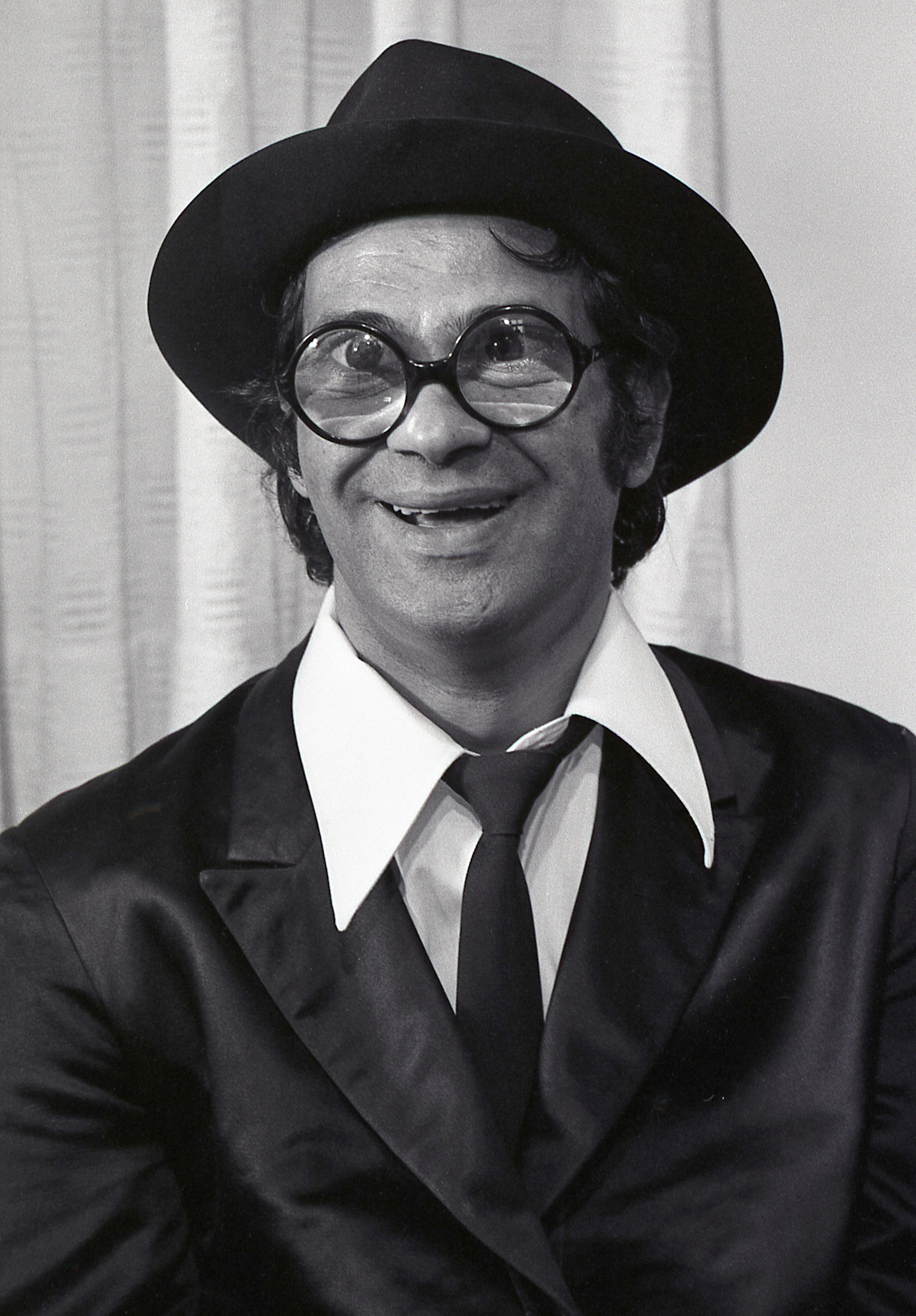
Revach in 1975

Even before the script was finalized, the lead actors had already been cast. The first to be chosen were Yehuda Barkan, who would play Charlie Ben-Hanania, and Ze'ev Revach for the role of Sasson. Barkan—often dubbed the "Burt Reynolds of Israeli cinema"—was already a "major star," known locally for films like Katz and Carasso (1971). The film was essentially tailor-made for him. As noted in an August 1973 article in Maariv: "The Zevuloni brothers asked Eli Tavor to develop a script centered around Yehuda Barkan as a young man of Mizrahi descent. Barkan, the film’s star, was cast even before Boaz Davidson was selected as director. In fact, Barkan’s agreement to take the role served as the glue that held the entire production together." For Revach, he was primarily known for dramatic roles at the Cameri Theater, though he also had film experience—including the film Snail (1970), where he first met Davidson.

Revach recalled that over the years, he gradually developed the character of Sasson, reprising and adapting it in various forms across multiple films, :In my childhood and early youth, I lived in the Musrara neighborhood of Jerusalem, and my father even founded the synagogue there, i based the character of Sasson on the types I knew in the neighborhood and in the synagogue—men who would pray on Shabbat and then sneak off to smoke in secret."

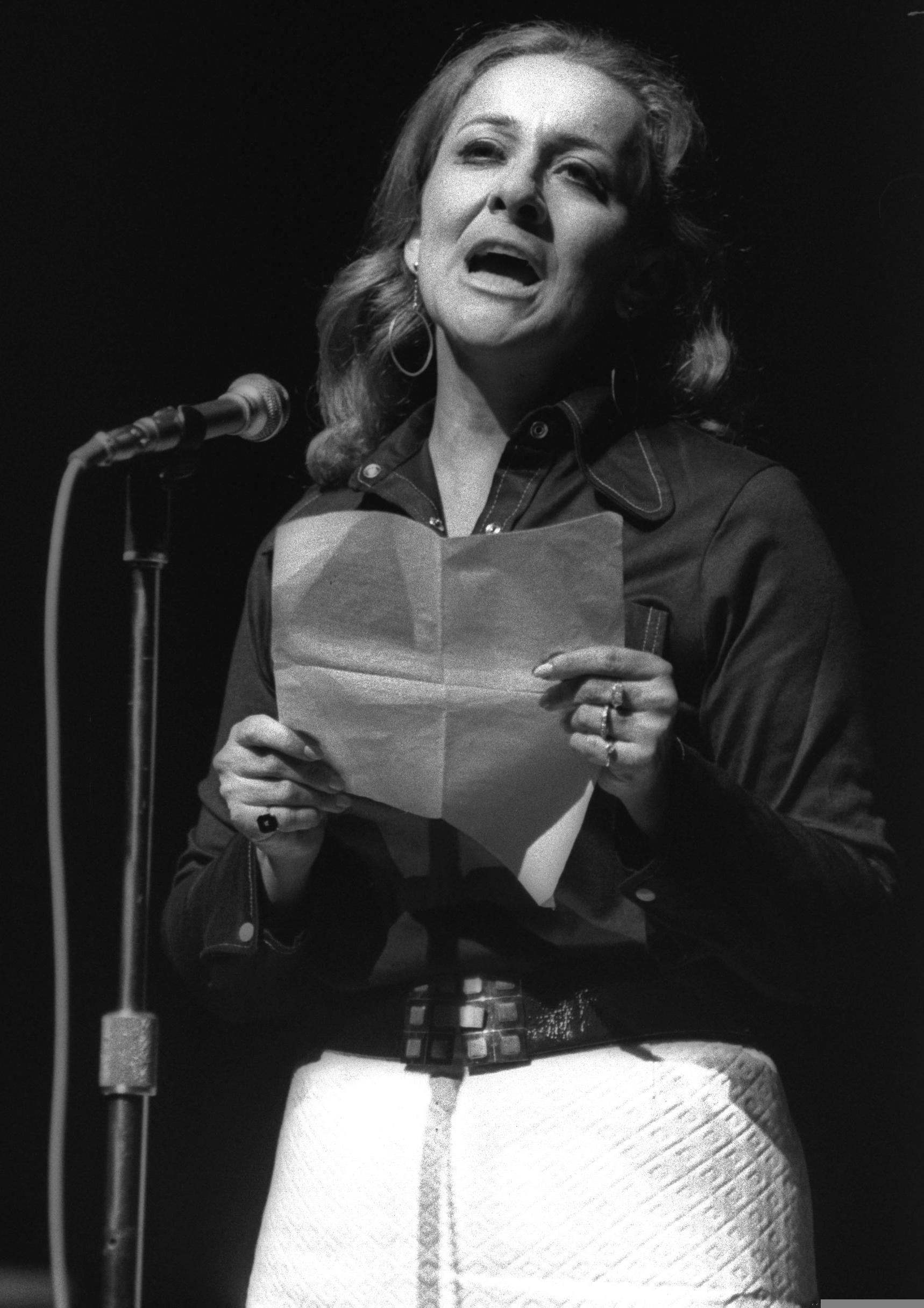
Fliedel in 1972

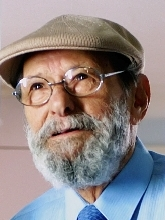
Alias in 2003

After the initial script was developed, director Davidson cast Edna Fleidel and Arie Elias as Charlie’s parents, Flora and Zaki, and selected Elisheva Michaeli and Nathan Cogan to portray Gila’s parents, Sima and Chaim. Davidson recalled "I was looking for older actors who could convincingly portray warm, authentic Mizrahi characters—people of the people, full of life wisdom, without rudeness or vulgarity. For the Ashkenazi parents, Elisheva and Nathan were ideal in age, appearance, and experience, both in theater and film."

The casting of Gila, Charlie's romantic interest, proved more challenging. Davidson wants a young actress who would convey both beauty and assertiveness, as well as the appearance of a daughter from a wealthy family. Among the final candidates were singers Edna Lev and Ilanit. However, the role ultimately went to 17-year-old Chaya Katzir, a "native of north Tel Aviv" and former winner of the "Israeli Girl" pageant, who had no prior acting experience. She was later sent to represent Israel in the Miss World competition, which was held in London, where she was crowned third runner-up. According to Davidson, he discovered Katzir during a visit to Sheraton Beach in Tel Aviv and invited her to audition. During the screen test, she was asked to deliver the line "I love you" to Barkan, which convinced the production team to cast her. The role of Miko, was considered the most difficult to cast. Although a public casting call was issued, Davidson eventually discovered David Shoshan through a televised report on a workers’ protest in Yeruham, where Shoshan, then 13, was interviewed. Davidson recalled "During the entire search, I couldn’t shake the image of this boy. When we met, I knew immediately he was right for the part.” Davidson arranged a meeting and subsequently cast him in the role. Despite having a different Moroccan accent than Geula Noni, who played his sister Lily, Davidson chose to overlook the inconsistency, just as he had with the varied accents of Arie Elias and Edna Fleidel. Shoshan later recalled "a philosophical kid, just like in the film. When Boaz Davidson saw me, he was thrilled." Shoshan born in Morocco, Shoshan immigrated to Israel at the age of one. While his father moved to Canada, he and his family settled in Yeruham.

=== Filming ===
Filming took place in northern Tel Aviv, Sheikh Munis—where Tel Aviv University now stands—in Jaffa, and in the commercial center of Kfar Shmaryahu. Production began in late September 1973. In early October 1973, the scene in which Sasson Nagarin (played by Ze'ev Revach) says, "Hello, Charlie," was shot. Just two days later, the Yom Kippur War broke out, halting production. When filming resumed in early February 1974, the scene continued seamlessly with Charlie (Yehuda Barkan) responding, "Hello, Sasson." In total, filming lasted 30 days and extended into 1974 due to the war. Jaffa, and in the commercial center of Kfar Shmaryahu.

=== Soundtrack ===
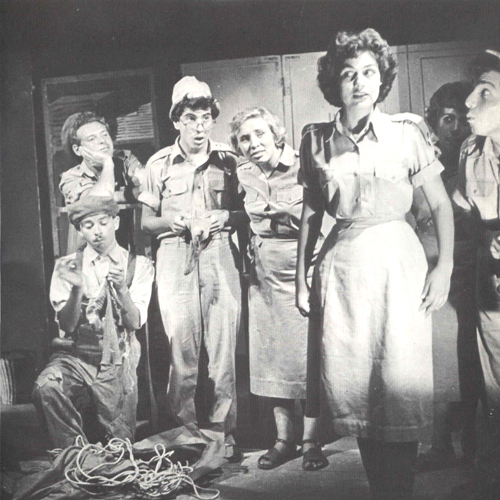
The Northern Command Band in 1955. Yaakov Bodo is kneeling on the left.

The film's soundtrack was composed by Yair Rosenblum. The theme song was performed by Uri Revach, brother of Ze'ev Revach, with lyrics by Yonatan Gefen. The ending melody, which appears in part during the film, was adapted into the song On the Grass at Night performed by Northern Command Band with additional lyrics by Esther Nitzav. To mark the film's 50th anniversary at the request of Barkan's son, Shlomi Shabat recorded a cover version of the song.

== Reception ==
Charlie and a Half was released in the summer of 1974, and it was met with negative reviews. Haaretz wrote: "The plot is almost nonexistent. Charlie, the young Spaniard, wanders aimlessly, hates work, and spends his days in pranks and deceit, especially toward a fat, stupid, and cowardly Ashkenazi." Yediot Aharonot criticized the film's low standards and questioned whether it was doing a disservice to its audience. Al HaMishmar described the film as "a rip-off... taking place in an anonymous Israel, without air, without location, without space. It's a shame for good talents whose sole goal is box office at any cost." They also questioned whether labeling the film as "popular entertainment" did justice to its audience and remarked on the position of its director: "Davidson is a man who studied film abroad, not in the Hatikva neighborhood." Davidson also faced "sharp" criticism over the concept of creating an "ethnic film."

"Who says it’s bad to make a film about ethnic communities? There’s no other country in the world with such a mix of cultures and people with such diverse customs. It’s like the Tower of Babel—though full of contradictions, those contrasts are the perfect soil for comedy"

— Director Davidson responded to the criticism via Davar.

Though the film was initially dismissed by critics, it was seen by approximately 700,000 people, grossed $698,000, and became one of the "biggest box office hits of the decade" in Israel, making it a blockbuster at the time. It has since gained a cult following and remains a "nostalgic favorite," with several of its quotes becoming embedded in Israeli popular culture, including: "Who's messing around is Miko," "He's seriously injured, we don't know what he has," and "How many eggs? How many there are, and more." The film also has been interpreted as foreshadowing the political upheaval of 1977, "with the election victory of Menachem Begin—the popular underdog who, though Ashkenazi himself, was seen as a representative of the Mizrahi community—over Shimon Peres, a symbol of the Ashkenazi establishment." This mirrors the plot of the film, in which Charlie wins the heart of Gila over Robert (played by Tuvia Tzafir), an educated Ashkenazi suitor. Gila is portrayed as disillusioned by her parents’ and Robert's hedonistic lifestyle and sees her relationship with Charlie as an act of defiance against societal norms.

== References in other media ==
- In Telenovela Ltd.—an Israeli daily comedy-drama series— the character, Kfir is forced to eat eggs with their shells as a punishment given by another character, Gershon.
- The TV show Hakhal HaTarbut featured a parody sketch about the characters from Charlie and a Half, showing what happened to them after the film and where they are today. The sketch was made to celebrate the film's 30th anniversary. The sketch titled "Charlie and a Half 2" starred Adir Miller and HaMeshulash comedy trio.
- In the TV series The 80s, Shalom performs an imitation of Charlie and a Half during his audition for the Sabra Band.
- In the film The Revelry, characters Halabi, Penso, and Hinga eat eggs with the shells on. This scene is a recreation of the original egg-eating scene from Charlie and a Half.

== See also ==
- Bourekas film
- List of Israeli films of 1970
- List of Israeli actors
