= Yaron Margolin =

Israeli dancer and choreographer (born 1954)

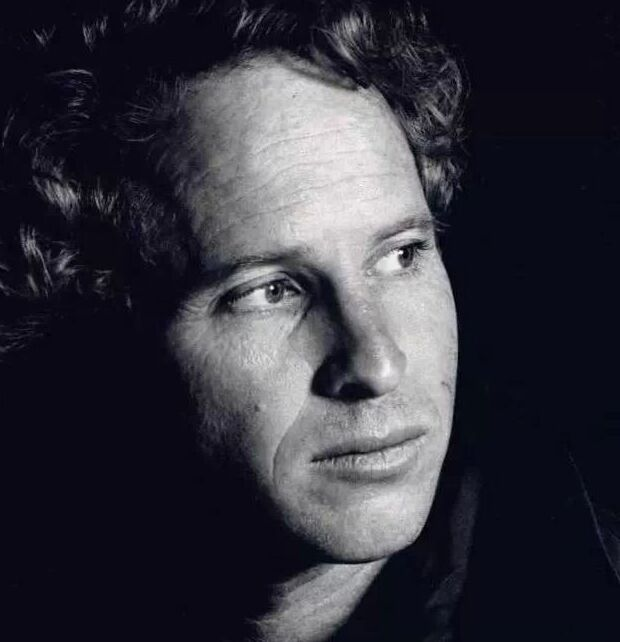
Yaron Margolin

Yaron Margolin (Hebrew: ירון מרגולין; born June 5, 1954) is an Israeli dancer and choreographer.

== Biography ==
=== Early years ===
Yaron Margolin was born in Tel Adashim, Israel (June 5, 1954) to one of the founding families of the farming village. His father, Jacob, born in the village, worked on several farms. His mother, Eve, a Holocaust survivor who immigrated to Israel in her youth, danced with Mia Arbatova in Tel Aviv. In 2013, Margolin's sister, Shlomit Margolin-Tamir, described their mother's life in her book Bows.

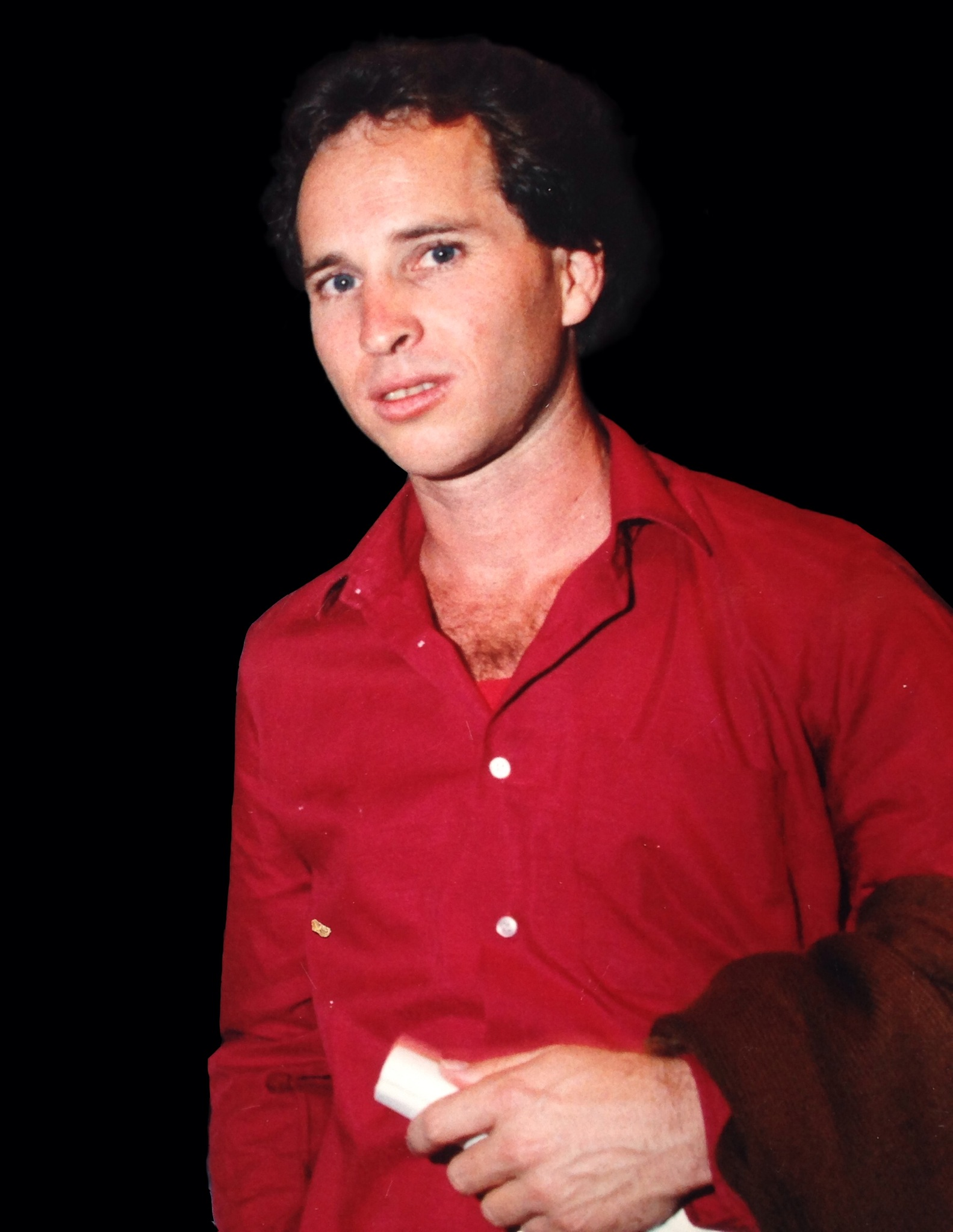
Yaron Margolin - Photography Eldad Baron 1987

=== Dance career ===
Margolin began dancing at a young age and in 1968 at age 14 was accepted to study under Yardena Cohen in Haifa, the recipient of the Israel Prize for her work as one of the founders of Israeli dance. In 1977, Margolin was accepted into the Batsheva Dance Company and debuted in the solo "Going," in the dance "Rooms," choreographed by Anna Sokolow.

In 1979, Margolin left the Batsheva Dance Company and joined teacher and choreographer Flora Cushman in The Jerusalem Dance Workshop. He also created his first recital, "Yaron Margolin Dance Recital," which toured Europe in 1980. At the same time, Margolin founded his first dance company, Katamon Workshop of Movement, in which both Anna Sokolow and Flora Cushman served as artistic advisers and guest teachers.

In 1982, as part of an Israeli duet program, Margolin toured throughout Mexico performing alongside Mexican dancer Rebecca Sitt to live music by the Bitran brothers. The premier was attended by composer Mario Lavista who came to watch the "Etude Con Sillas" duet that was choreographed to his music.

In 1987, Margolin established in Jerusalem the Yaron Margolin Dance Company, which debuted the same year at the Israel Festival Jerusalem. Anna Sokolow choreographed for this production "Poem" inspired by Edgar Allan Poe's "Alone"; music by Sergei Rachmaninoff. Several independent choreographers experimented in dance theater which Margolin was a part of. In 1999, Margolin also founded the Multicultural Dance Company, an amateur troop that sought participation of youth at risk from disadvantaged neighborhoods, including Jews and Arabs, immigrants from the former Soviet Union and Ethiopia, and Palestinians from refugee camps around Jerusalem. Margolin created the suite "The Dances of Shem's Sons," which went on two rounds of performances throughout Europe.

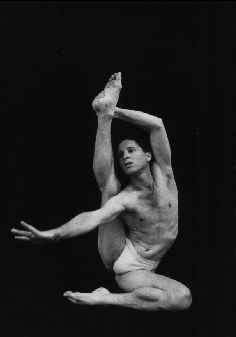
Yaron Margolin

=== Margolin Method ===
Margolin developed a dance language that develops a dancer's flexibility and movement. His techniques were adopted by several of his students who also use the Margolin Method as part of their work as healers/therapists.

=== Personal life ===
Margolin married in 1981 and divorced in 1985. He lives in Jerusalem. Works as a healer and has two children Tamer and Yuri.

== Works ==
=== Cursed Women ===
Margolin's first famous dance production Cursed Women (1987, Music by César Franck), inspired by four poems of Charles Baudelaire, was controversial because it marked the first time in Israel that fully nude men and women danced on stage. The debut took place at Tzavta Tel Aviv instead of his hometown Jerusalem for fear of ultra-Orthodox demonstrations to prevent the debut.

=== Davidbundlertanze ===
As a guest to the Noverre Institute, the Davidbundlertanze recital (1989, Music by Robert Schumann) made a pre-premier appearance at the home of the Stuttgart Ballet in Germany. Margolin's second recital premiered at the Israel Festival .

=== Other ===
Inferno (1992, Music by Franz Liszt) A duet inspired by the Divine Comedy by Dante Alighieri. Margolin appeared alongside his dancer and student Yael Harmati. Consolation (1992, Music by Franz Liszt)

Fire of Envy "Nur al Ira" (1996, Arabic music by Mohammed Abdel Wahab)

Persian Dance (1997, Music by Modest Mussorgsky). A solo he worked on for 10 years created for his dance student Gal Chen.

Oriental Fantasy (1997) A three-hour show that premiered in the Jerusalem Theater. It included several of Margolin's dance pieces that he created for his students and the top belly dancers of Israel. Tango on the Edge of a Stool (1998, Music by Alfred Schnittke)

The Dancing Serpent (1999, Music by César Franck). This piece, inspired by Charles Baudelaire's poem, Margolin considers the highlight of his work.

== Publications ==
=== The Splendor of Movement ===
Published in 1980, Margolin describes the body as the basis of dance through the Kabbalistic concept of The Tree of Life. The quality of the muscular flow illustrates the dancer's spirit and the existence of a soul. Margolin used this theory in his body training method as a dancer and as a teacher. "The Splendor of Movement" was reviewed in the German newspaper Berliner Morgenpost, which described it as a new philosophy of dance.

=== The Independent Dance. Essence, Creation and Interpretation ===
1999 Co-written with philosopher Nicu Horodniceanu (pen name: Naftali Ironi).

=== Various ===
In the 1990s Margolin was a dance critic for The Jerusalem Newspaper and Radio. He published articles in various magazines and websites and worked as an editor and contributor for the IsraelDance.co.il Website.

- "Can One Teach Choreography?" (1984), Israel Dance Annual
- "Problems of the Coda" (1986), Israel Dance Annual
- "Problems of the Beginning" (1987), Israel Dance Annual and (1996), Folk Dance Supplement
- "Dances From the Olympus - The 'Landscape Dances' of Sara Levi-Tanai" (1989), Israel Dance Annual
- "Is an Open Mind Dangerous to Dance?" (1994), Israel Dance Quarterly
- "The Fighters of the Streets of New York" (1996), Israel Dance Quarterly
- "Daddy, I'm Dancing Nude" (1997), Israel Dance Quarterly
- "Flourishing Talent Portrait - About Orna Kugel the Ballerina of the Israeli Ballet" (1998), Israel Dance Quarterly

== Awards ==
- 1977 – Gertrud Kraus Scholarship from the America-Israel Cultural Foundation.
- 1980–1981 – Scholarship to attend Maurice Béjart's Mudra School in Brussels.
- 1993 – Honor Award for Choreography, presented at the Brasov Dance Festival.
- 2000 – Recognition Certificate from the Jerusalem Municipality for contributions to the advancement of youth in Jerusalem.
