= Elisheva Michaeli =

Israeli actress (1928–2009)

- אלישבע מיכאלי
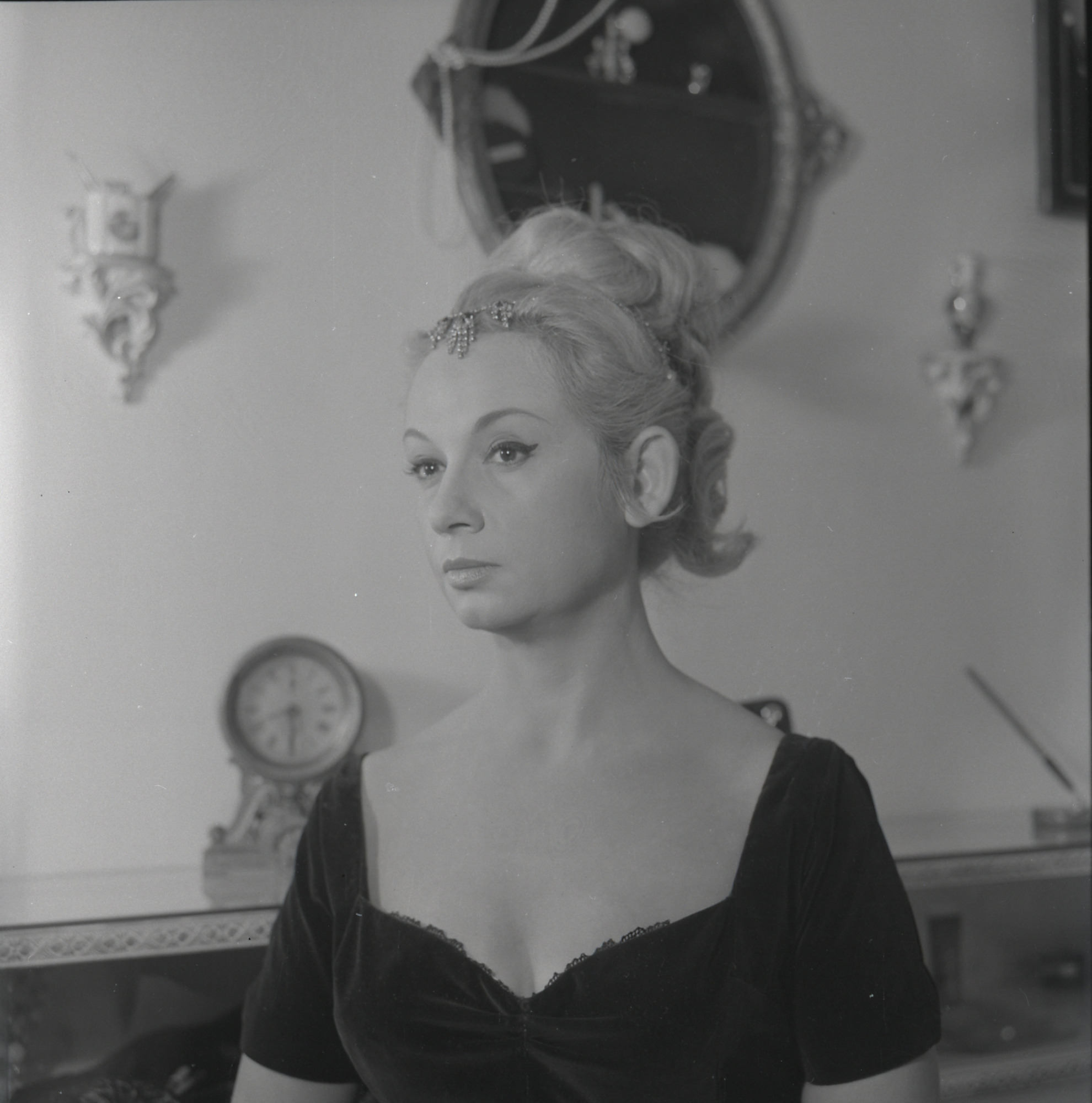
- Michaeli in 1964
- Born: 17 June 1928; Tel Aviv, Mandatory Palestine
- Died: 2 January 2009 (aged 80); Haifa, Israel
- Occupation: Actress
- Years active: 1947–2004
- Spouse: Moshe Mashali (m. 1946; died 1948)
- Children: 1

Elisheva Michaeli (Hebrew: אלישבע מיכאלי; 17 June 1928 – 2 January 2009) was an Israeli actress.

== Selected filmography ==
- 1966: The Flying Matchmaker as Rebbe Pinchas' wife
- 1969: Blaumilch Canal as Dvora
- 1972: I Love You Rosa as Regina
- 1973: Big Gus, What's the Fuss? as Frida Pszczerdowska
- 1974: Charlie and a Half as Mrs. Zohar

== Awards ==
- 2003: Ophir Award, shortlisted for Best Actress in Cafe Stories
