= Delet Haksamim =

- Genre: Children, Educational
- Written by: Avraham Heffner; Yitzhak Ben Ner
- Starring: Gideon Singer; Mordechai Ben-Ze'ev; David Beit-On; Shlomit Lehavi; Gidi Gov
- Opening theme: "Delet Haksamim" (דלת הקסמים) by Chava Alberstein
- Country of origin: Israel
- Original language: Hebrew
- No. of seasons: 1
- No. of episodes: 12

Original release
- Network: Israeli Educational Television
- Release: 1 July 1974 – 1974

Delet Haksamim (Hebrew: דלת הקסמים, lit. "The magic door") is an Israeli educational children's television program which deals with road traffic safety intended for its main target audience, primary school students. It was produced by the Israeli Film Service and co-product Israel's Ministry of Education and Ministry of Transport and Road Safety and written Avraham Heffner and Yitzhak Ben Ner. The program was aired in 1974 on the Israeli Educational Television (IETV), since aired in reruns at the 1980s.

== Background ==
The program follows after a magician called Yehoyakim Kook (Gideon Singer), who taught two siblings, Yoav and Hagar Bergman about road safety through a door to beep each time when someone has non-observance of the road safety laws. Then he is summons and shows them through a magical eye how they misdeeds to be finished with disaster. Usually each episode the siblings getting on the nervous of old pharmacist Dr. Tuvia Guttman (Mordechai Ben-Ze'ev) and then sent his assistant, Hertzel (Gidi Gov) out of his store to chase them due to different problems.
