= Yosef-Michael Lamm =

Israeli judge and politician (1899-1976)

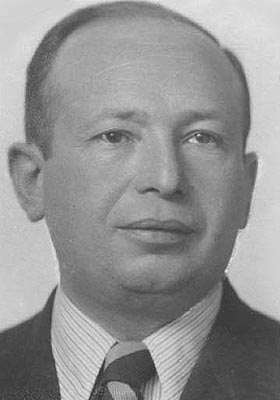

Faction represented in the Knesset
- 1949–1951: Mapai

Personal details
- Born: 1899 Galicia, Austria-Hungary
- Died: 25 May 1976 (aged 76–77)

Yosef-Michael Lamm (Hebrew: יוֹסֵף־מִיכָאֵל לַם; 1899 – 25 May 1976) was an Israeli judge and politician who served as a member of the Knesset between 1949 and 1951.

== Biography ==
Born in Galicia in Austria-Hungary, Lamm attended school and university in Vienna, where he studied international trade and law, and gained a doctorate in jurisprudence. Whilst a student, he joined the Austrian branch of Tzeiri Zion. After the German invasion of Austria in 1938 he was arrested and sent to Dachau concentration camp. However, in 1939 he left Austria and made aliyah to Mandatory Palestine.

== Legal and political career ==
In 1944, he helped establish the New Working Immigration organisation, which consisted of immigrants from Germany and Austria. In the same year he became a member of the Assembly of Representatives and the Jewish National Council, which he served on until 1947, when he became the legal advisor on supply and prices to the Settlements Regulatory Authority. He also served as a member of the executive committee of the Histadrut trade union.

In 1948, he was nominated to be a magistrate judge. The following year he was elected to the first Knesset on the Mapai list, having joined the party the previous year. During his tenure as an MK, he was a member of the Constitution, Law and Justice Committee and the Committee for Public Services. In 1950, he became a district judge in Tel Aviv and rotating president of the district court. On 21 May 1951 he resigned from the Knesset and was replaced by Rafael Bash. He died in 1976.
