= Ha-Chaim Ze Lo Hacol =

- החיים זה לא הכל
- Genre: Sitcom
- Created by: Daniel Lappin
- Written by: Daniel Lappin; Ofer Knispel; Haim Idisis; Amit Lior; Gaya Wildman
- Starring: Avi Kushnir; Anat Waxman; Idan Alterman; Yael Leventhal; Motti Katz; Nurit Cohen; Shlomo Vishinsky; Florence Bloch (seasons 4–present); Lilian Berto (seasons 5–present); Avigail Lappin (seasons 5–present); Yuval Segal (seasons 5–6); Roni Herman (seasons 9–present)
- Opening theme: "Send Me on My Way" by Rusted Root
- Country of origin: Israel
- Original language: Hebrew
- No. of seasons: 9
- No. of episodes: 149

Production
- Running time: 25 minutes
- Production company: JCS Productions

Original release
- Network: Channel 2 (Telad) (seasons 1–4), (Reshet) (seasons 5–present)
- Release: July 2, 2001 – September 20, 2011

Ha-Chaim Ze Lo Hacol (Hebrew: החיים זה לא הכל; lit. Life is Not Everything) is a sitcom on Israeli television. The show ran on Channel 2.

With 9 seasons in the course of 10 years, It is the longest-running Israeli sitcom to date in terms of number of seasons, though not in number of episodes.

== Important Figures ==
- Gadi Noiman (Avi Kushnir) - 38 years old, a writer of Benny Knobler's comedy talk show, was married to Dafna, divorced her and returned to her in the last episode of the series, the father of Michal.
- Dafna Ringel (Anat Waxman) - 36 years old, was married to Gadi and divorced him in season 4, studies communication throughout most of the seasons, in Season 9 she is a doctor of communication.
- Mickey Bernstein (Idan Alterman) - 28 years old, a friend of Gadi, dimwitted, Orly's partner, marries her at the end of season 3.
- Batya Noiman (Nurit Cohen) - Mother of Gadi, married to Meir, not satisfied with her life, always hopes that Gadi and Dafna will marry each other again.
- Meir Noiman (Shlomo Vishinski) - Father of Gadi. Married to Batya, loves discoveries and science.
- Orly Bernstein (Yael Leventhal) - Married to Mickey, an absurd and decisive woman, in season 9 she's a hygienist.
- Benny Knobler (Motti Katz) - A mean-spirited and rude television talk show host, married to Doris, became the channel CEO at the end of the series, conniving, hurtful and rude.
- Doris Knobler (Florence Bloch) - A woman who marries Benny in season 4, and shares a similar rude pattern of behavior like him.
- Michal Zilberman (Lillian Barreto) - Gadi's life partner through seasons 5–7, Mother of Noa Zilberman.
- Noa Zilberman (Avigail Lappin) - The daughter of Michal, she's a manipulative teenager who tends to blackmail people for her own needs.

== Minor characters ==
- Ehud Tal (Yuval Segal) - Dafna's boyfriend in seasons 5–7.
- Big Mickey (Dvir Benedek) - A boyfriend of Orly throughout season 7, almost married her before she reunited with Mickey Bernstein, loves Orly and lets the two live in his apartment because of his affection for her, but still he is always rejected by her.
- Michal Noiman (Ronnie Herman) - Gadi and Dafna's daughter, born in the second-season finale, First seen as a grown child in season 9.

guest actor:Efrat Rayten, Eli Yatzpan, Shmuel Wolf, Eli Finish, Mariano Idelman, Alma Zack
