= Dalia and the Sailors =

- דליה והמלחים
- Directed by: Menahem Golan
- Written by: Manya Halevi; Yosh Halevi; Menahem Golan; Shaike Ophir
- Produced by: Modechai Navon
- Starring: Véronique Vendell; Shraga Friedman; Oded Teomi; Arik Einstein
- Cinematography: Harry Waxman; David Gurfinkel
- Edited by: Nellie Gilad
- Music by: Itzhak Graziani; Neomi Shemer
- Production company: Geva Films
- Release date: 13 August 1964
- Running time: 106 minutes
- Country: Israel
- Languages: Hebrew, French

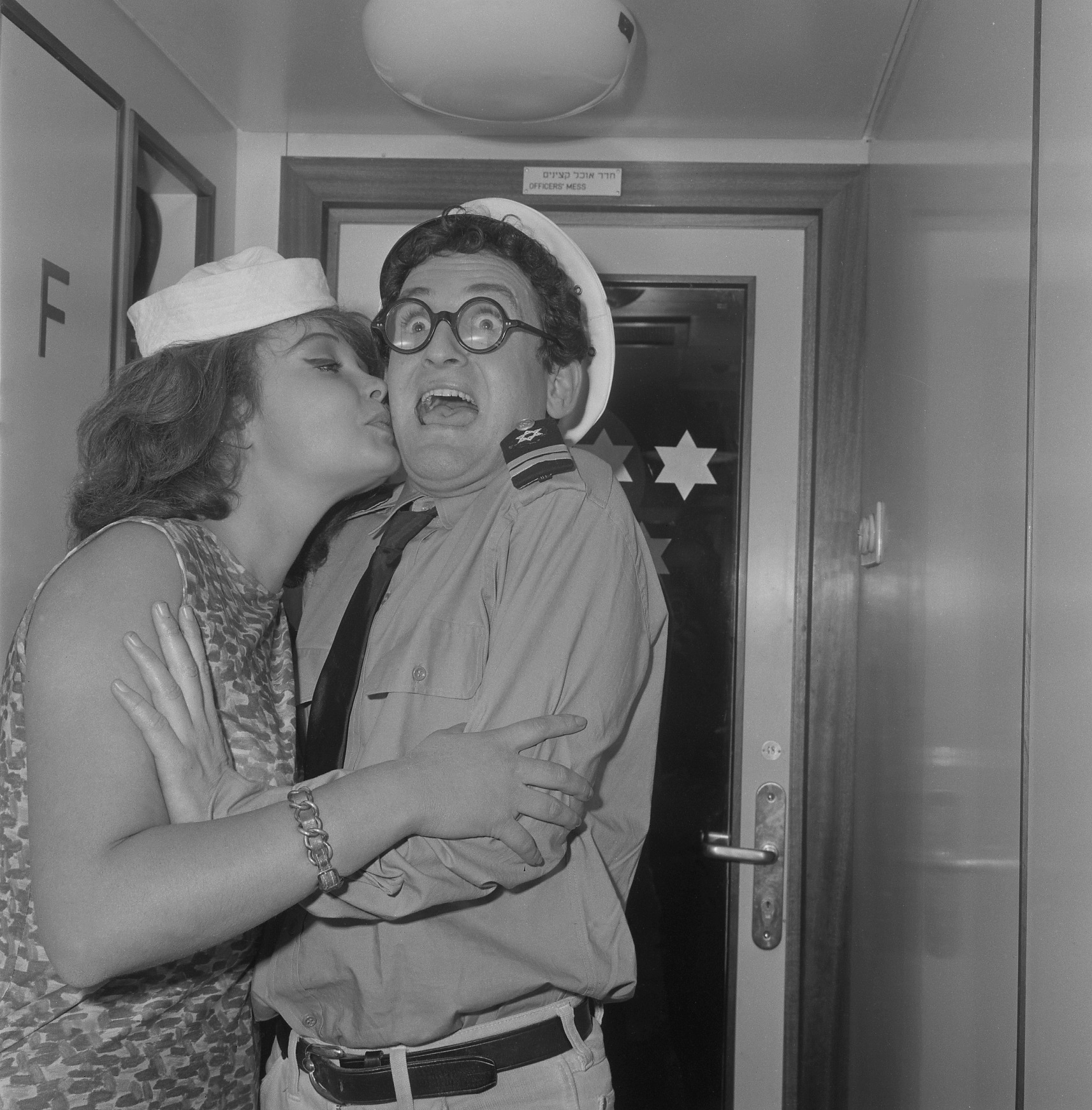
Véronique Vandel and Israel Gurion in the film

Dalia and the Sailors (Hebrew: דליה והמלחים, romanized: Dliah VeHaMlachin) is an Israeli comedy film directed by Menahem Golan and produced by Mordecai Navon. It was Menachem Golan's second film.

== Plot ==
Dalia (Véronique Vendell) immigrated with her parents as a child from Israel to Canada. As a young woman, she misses Israel and wants to return. She sneaks on board a freighter sailing from to Israel but is soon discovered by the crew who try to hide her from the captain (Shraga Friedman) and the other officers.

== Cast ==
- Véronique Vendell as Dalia Dekelman
- Shraga Friedman as Captain Avraham Rappaport
- Arik Einstein as Hillel "Gurnischt" Goren
- Oded Teomi as Ron
- Gideon Singer as Lieutenant
- Ya'akov Ben-Sira as Chief
- Ori Levy as bos'n, the boatswain
- Shaike Ophir as Jacko, the helmsman
- Hanan Goldblatt as Stanislav Kuchinski, a sailor
- Mordechai Arnon as Toto, a sailor
- Shlomo Vishinski as Srulik, a sailor
- Benny Amdurski as a sailor
- Yehoram Gaon as a sailor
- Israel Gurion as Shmulik, the radio operator
- Reuven Shefer as Fuchs
- Bomba Tzur as Berman, the cook
- Mordechai Ben-Ze'ev as Chiney Chang, the cook's assistant
- Menachem Golan as Italian policeman Vittorio De Sica (uncredited)

== Reception ==
Dalia and the Sailors sold 599,000 tickets, making it the 28th most popular Israeli film in Israeli film history. This is the first Israeli movie ever to feature nudity, although partial and by a foreign actress (Veronique Vendell). Her brief nude scene contributed much to the movie's popularity when it was first released.

== Soundtrack ==
The music for the movie was composed by Itzhak Graziani. Neomi Shemer composed two songs for the films, the title song "Na'arat HaSipun" (The Deck Girl; Hebrew: נערת הסיפון) and "Layla BeHof Achziv" (Night at Achziv Beach; Hebrew: לילה בחוף אכזיב) which was performed by Yarkon Bridge Trio and later released on the trio's debut album.

A four-song Extended play was issued for the film. The EP didn't contain two more songs that were performed in the movie, "Layla BeHof Achziv" and "Ktovet Ka'aka" (Tattoo; Hebrew: כתובת קעקע) by Theatre Club Quartet (with Hanan Goldblatt replacing original member Shimon Bar), which was previously released by the quartet in 1958.

=== Track listing ===
Side A

1. "Na'arat HaSipun" (The Deck Girl; Hebrew: נערת הסיפון) – Band (2:30)
2. "Charleston" (Hebrew: צ'רלסטון) – Itzhak Graziani (3:00)

Side B

1. "Shake" (Hebrew: שייק) – Yarkon Bridge Trio (2:15)
2. "Twist" (Hebrew: טוויסט) – Don Julio (2:30)

== See also ==
- Cinema of Israel
