= Bomba Tzur =

Israeli actor

- בומבה צור
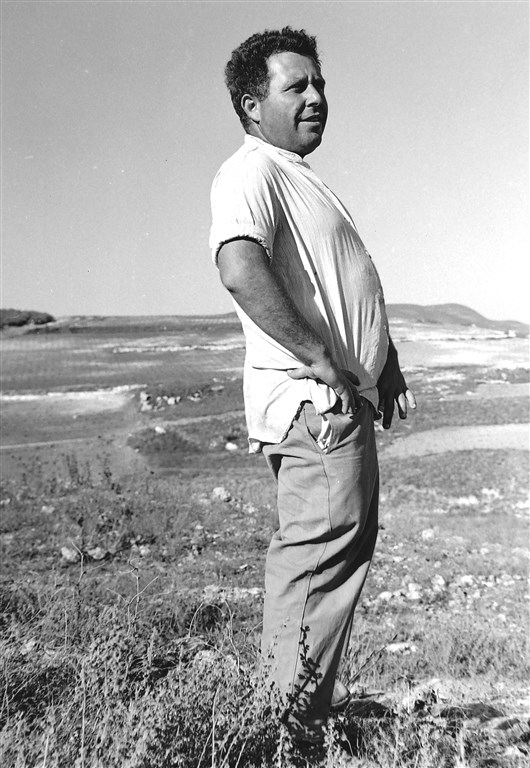
- Tzur in They Were Ten (1960)
- Born: Yosef Welzer; 26 December 1928; Haifa, Mandatory Palestine
- Died: 21 March 1979 (aged 50); Herzliya, Israel
- Occupations: Actor; comedian; film producer; screenwriter
- Years active: 1947–1979
- Children: 3

Yosef "Bomba" Tzur (né Yosef Welzer; 26 December 1928 – 21 March 1979) was an Israeli theatre and film actor, screenwriter, producer, and comedian.

Tzur is best remembered for his roles in the films Dalia And The Sailors (1964), Hole in the Moon (1964), Trunk to Cairo (1965), Fortuna (1966), Blaumilch Canal (1969), and Big Gus, What's the Fuss? (1973).

He was a recipient of the Kinor David award.

== Personal life ==
His first wife was Ila Nodelman, and they had a son named Amnon. A year after the death of his second wife from cancer, Tzur died from the same disease. He was buried next to his wife in the cemetery in Herzliya.

== See also ==
- Culture of Israel
- Cinema of Israel
