= Ra'ash =

Ra'ash رعاش
- Sub-district
- Location in Yemen
- Coordinates: 13°54′05″N 44°01′24″E
- Country: Yemen
- Governorate: Ibb Governorate
- District: Dhi As Sufal District

Population (2004)
  - Total: 2,138
- Time zone: UTC+3

Ra'ash (Arabic: رعاش) is a sub-district located in Dhi al-Sufal District, Ibb Governorate, Yemen. Ra'ash had a population of 2138 as of 2004.
