= Rafael Bash =

Israeli politician

- רפאל בש
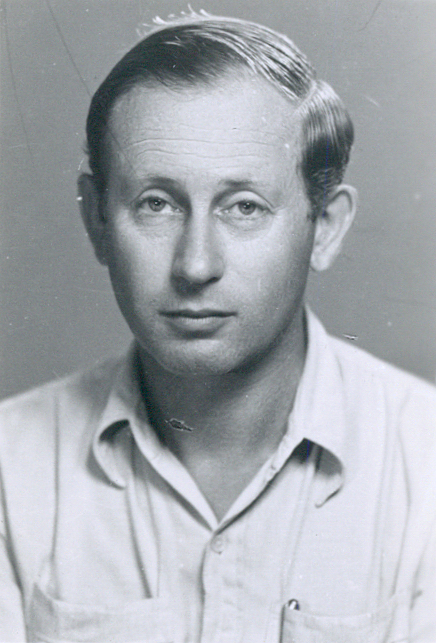

Faction represented in the Knesset
- 1951: Mapai

Personal details
- Born: 8 January 1913 Russian Empire
- Died: 10 March 2000 (aged 87)

Rafael Bash (Hebrew: רפאל בש; 8 January 1913 – 10 March 2000) was an Israeli politician who served as a member of the first Knesset for three months in 1951.

== Biography ==
Born in the Russian Empire in what is today Latvia, Bash made aliyah to Mandatory Palestine in 1938. He joined kibbutz Kfar Blum, where he remained a member until 1956. He was on the Mapai list for the 1949 Knesset election but missed out on a seat. In 1950, he became director of Mapai's youth department, a position he held until 1953. He entered the Knesset on 21 May 1951 as a replacement for Yosef-Michael Lamm, who had resigned, but lost his seat in the July 1951 elections.

In 1954, Bash became General Secretary of Mapai, serving until 1956. Between 1962 and 1966 he served as the party's secretary. He was also a member of the Histadrut's central committee, and became director of its Culture and Education centre in 1966. He also served on the secretariat of the Tel Aviv-Yafo Workers Council. He died in 2000 at the age of 87.
