= Nurit Cohen =

Israeli actress (1939–2013)

- נורית כהן
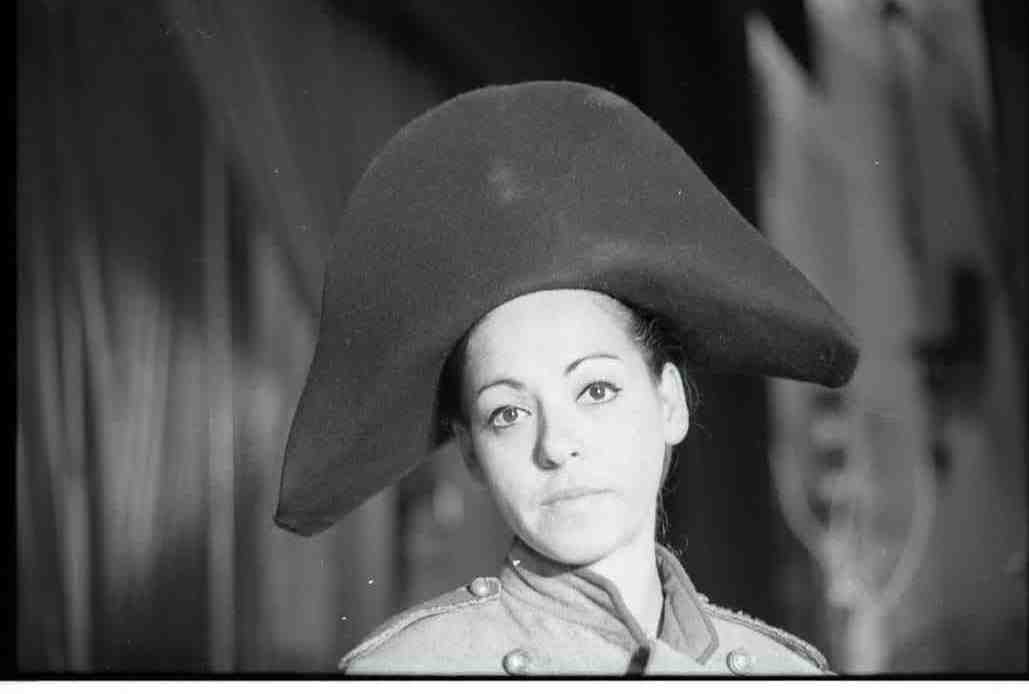
- Cohen in 1970
- Born: 26 October 1939; Mandatory Palestine
- Died: 14 February 2013 (aged 73); Petah Tikva, Israel
- Occupations: Actress; voice actress
- Years active: 1954–2012
- Spouse: Misha Natan (died 1995)
- Children: 2

Nurit Cohen (Hebrew: נורית כהן; 26 October 1939 – 14 February 2013) was an Israeli actress and voice actress. She was best known for her role in the sitcom Life is Not Everything where she played the character of Batya Neuman.
