= They Were Ten =

- Directed by: Baruch Dienar
- Production companies: Orb Films; Scopus Productions
- Release date: 1961
- Country: Israel
- Budget: $100,000

They Were Ten (Hebrew: הם היו עשרה) is a 1961 Israeli film directed by Baruch Dienar.

== Reception ==
A review in The New York Times stated "An Israeli counterpart of an American Western, this one set on the frontier of Palestine back in the late nineteenth century when that ancient country was under control of the Turks, is interestingly and movingly presented in Baruch Dienar's "They Were Ten" ("Heym Hayu Assara")." The film is indeed described by the Israel Film Archive as a "Zionist, pioneer Western", while TV Guide wrote it was "A touching story about early Russian immigrants to Galilee who manage to overcome numerous hardships from the harsh climate, Arab neighbors, and within themselves to form a settlement." It is considered one of the most important films in the history of Israeli cinema.

The film was directed by Baruch Diner and starred, among others, Oded Teomi, Bomba Tzur, Leo Filer, Gabriel Dagan, Yehuda Gabay, Nissim Azikri, Eitan Freiver, Israel Rubinchik, and Ninette Diner. The screenplay was written by Diner together with Gabriel Dagan and Menachem Shoval.

== Production and Distribution ==
The film was characterized by minimal use of props, a small cast, and a slow-paced storyline. The film was edited by Helga Keller. It was shot near the village of Segev. The film’s premiere took place at the “HaBira” cinema in Jerusalem, attended by President Yitzhak Ben-Zvi and Jerusalem Mayor Mordechai Ish-Shalom. The film’s soundtrack was released on a record by the “Hadarti” label and included three songs sung in the film by Shimon Israeli.

“They Were Ten” was the first film to receive financial support from the Fund for the Encouragement of Israeli Film.

== Plot ==
The film’s plot centers on a group of pioneers, Russian establishing a cooperative settlement in the Land of Israel. The group consists of Russian Jews, nine men and one woman—Manya. The film explores the challenges facing the group: the attitude of the Ottoman authorities, the attitude of their Arab neighbors, existential problems (malaria, water shortages), and internal dynamics within the group.

== Commentaries ==
Numerous commentaries and analyses have been written about the film. Researcher Ella Shochat notes that the use of the original languages of each character (the pioneers speak Russian, the Arabs speak Arabic), and the pioneers’ attempts to communicate in Arabic, symbolize their openness.

Another film scholar, Nitzan Ben-Shaul, analyzed the film in comparison to the film “Sabra,” arguing that while the conflict between Jews and Arabs in ‘Sabra’ revolves around resources, in “They Were Ten” it is a conflict over law and order, which holds the potential for a resolution.

Film critic Uri Klein wrote that “the concepts of home and community, as depicted in ‘They Were Ten,’ are undermined: Home is temporary, and the community consists of individuals who do not integrate into a collective, despite the social rituals in which they participate, which include communal singing and even a Hasidic dance during the harvest.”
