= Blaumilch Canal =

- Israeli poster of the film designed by Tzila Menussi
- תעלת בלאומילך
- Directed by: Ephraim Kishon
- Written by: Ephraim Kishon
- Based on: A Legend About a Canal in Tel Aviv by Ephraim Kishon
- Produced by: Roni Ya'ackov
- Starring: Bomba Tzur; Gideon Singer; Shaike Ophir; Zaharira Harifai; Avner Hizkiyahu; Albert Cohen; Oshik Levi; Rivka Michaeli; Uri Zohar; Tzipi Shavit; Yehuda Efroni; Reuven Shefer
- Cinematography: David Gurfinkel
- Production companies: Herzliya Studios; RKO Pictures
- Release dates: 16 March 1969 (Israel); 10 July 1969 (West Germany); 10 November 1970 (U.S.)
- Running time: 95 minutes (87 minutes in the German version)
- Country: Israel
- Languages: Hebrew; German
- Budget: $500,000

Blaumilch Canal (international release title: The Big Dig) is a 1969 Israeli satirical film written and directed by Ephraim Kishon, depicting the madness of bureaucracy through a municipality's reaction to the actions of a lunatic. The film is based on a humorous story titled "A Legend About a Canal in Tel Aviv" by Kishon, first published in 1952 and later included in the book A Thousand and One Kids.

The film achieved commercial success and critical acclaim, winning the Best Foreign Film award at the Barcelona Film Festival and the Jury Prize at the Monte Carlo Film Festival, and was also nominated for a Golden Globe Award.

== Plot ==
Blaumilch is a lunatic with a digging compulsion who escapes from an insane asylum by hiding in the back of a truck that delivers milk to the institution. Stealing a jackhammer and compressor, he proceeds to dig up one of Tel Aviv's busiest traffic arteries, at the junctions of Allenby, Ben Yehuda, and Pinsker Streets, in front of the iconic Mugrabi Cinema.

Rather than question his actions, the police and city officials assume he is operating under the municipality's orders, and aid him as much as they can. Complaints from local residents, whose lives have become a living hell due to the noise and traffic jams, lead to infighting amongst city departments. To speed up the work, so that it can be completed before the upcoming municipal elections, the city sends armies of construction workers and heavy equipment to help the lone jackhammer operator, turning a mere annoyance into a full-blown disaster.

Hauled before a police commissioner to explain why they attempted to sabotage municipal construction equipment, the residents give a vocal rendition of the noises they are subjected to daily until the commissioner himself yells for quiet.

When city officials realize they are destroying a street without any plans or goals in sight, it is too late: Allenby Street is connected with the Mediterranean Sea, and a canal is created. In a flamboyant opening ceremony, the mayor then declares that Tel Aviv has been turned into the Venice of the Middle East.

In an ironic twist, Ziegler, a low-level municipal administrator, is the only one to realize that the 'project' was the work of a lunatic; he is laughed at, and himself branded a lunatic. In the final scene, Blaumilch is seen digging up Kings of Israel Square (today Rabin Square), which fronts the Tel Aviv Municipality building.

== Cast ==
- Bomba Tzur as Blaumilch
- Nissim Azikri as Yehezkel Ziegler
- Shraga Friedman as Dr. Avigdor Kooiybishevsky
- Gideon Singer as Police Chief Akiva Levkowicz
- Avner Hizkiyahu as Menachem Zeev Zuckerman
- Shaike Ophir as the police officer
- Mosko Alkalai as Zelig Schultheiss
- Zaharira Harifai as a neighbor
- Reuven Bar-Yotam as a foreman
- Oshik Levi as a police officer
- Rivka Michaeli as a highway maintenance worker
- Tzipi Shavit as a phone operator
- Uri Zohar as an orchestra conductor

== Production ==
=== Pre-production ===
In February 1952, Ephraim Kishon's comedic short story "A Legend About a Canal in Tel Aviv" was published in the Mapai-affiliated newspaper Davar. The story centers around a mentally deranged former construction worker from Bat Yam named Naftali Berman who escapes from a mental hospital and begins drilling a hole in the middle of Tel Aviv. This short story formed the general basis for Blaumich Canal.

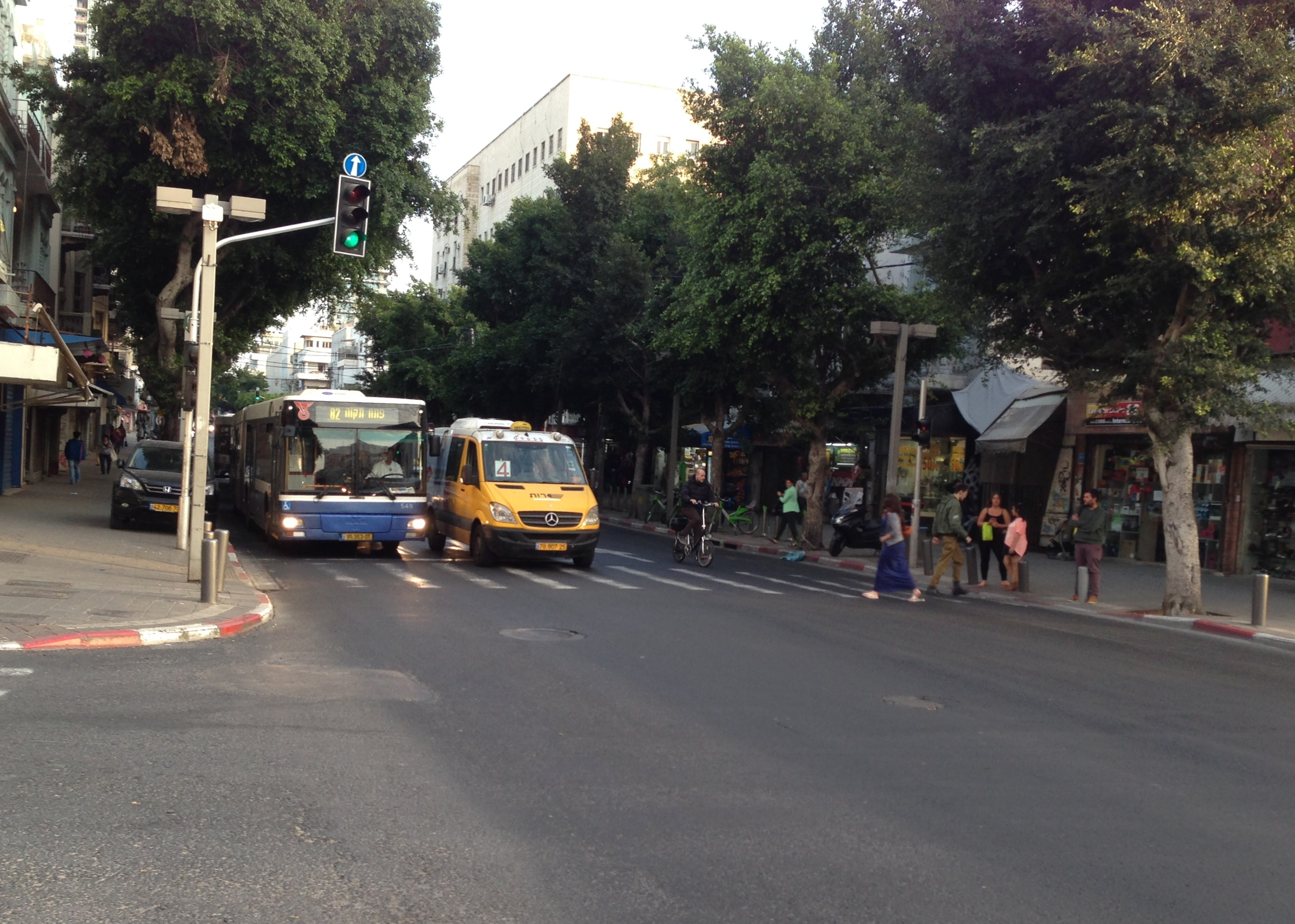
Allenby Street in Tel Aviv. As part of the pre-production of Blaumilch Canal, a complete recreation of the street was built as a set on the studio lot of Herzliya Studios.

Kishon wanted the film to have an accurate recreation of Allenby Street and its nearby roundabout, and furthermore, that it would have an attempt at recreating the canals of Venice. However, he did not know exactly how feasible this could be, and thus he asked his co-producer, Roni Ya'ackov, to help with this part of pre-production. To do this, Ya'ackov flew to England to try to find any feasible solutions, but was unimpressed by the options presented there. Eventually, he figured out a solution and suggested making an actual canal for the recreated set of Allenby Street. This was an expensive and difficult process, and the film's funding had to be partially provided by several investors, including RKO Pictures and several West German film production studios, to help with this process. The cost of the film was $500,000, which at the time made it one of the most expensive Israeli films ever made. The set was built on the studio lot of Herzliya Studios.

The film's cast was also quite extravagant for the time, with many of Israel's then leading actors cast and hundreds of extras recruited. In October 1968, a man named Yigal Himmelblau was indicted on allegations that he scammed some of the extras out of their payments by pocketing some of their pay for himself. Rodika Alkalai recorded some of the film's pre-production and filming on her 8 mm film camera, documenting the work of the set designers, amongst other things.

=== Filming ===
Due to the elaborate set design, any scenes of the film involving the canal had to be filmed last. The filming of the film lasted throughout much of 1968, finishing in November of that year.

=== Post-Production ===
Although the film was filmed in colour, no film laboratory existed in Israel at that time that supported colour film, and thus the film's post-production was conducted in England.

== Release and reception ==
=== Israeli reception ===
Blaumilch Canal premiered in Israeli theatres on March 16, 1969. Critical reception of the film in the Israeli press was quite positive, with several reviews considering it Kishon's best film yet. Reviews highlighted the satirical elements of the film and how it contrasted with its bombastic pacing and humor. The film was also commercially successful, becoming one of the highest-grossing films of that year in Israel.

=== International reception ===
The Berlin International Film Festival refused to show the film despite its funding having been provided partially by West German studios on the grounds that the film's premise could "only have happened in Israel". Nevertheless, the film was screened at the Barcelona Film Festival and the Monte Carlo Film Festival, where in both it received acclaim.

The film was nominated for the Golden Globe Award for Best Foreign Language Film.
