= Mia Arbatova =

Israeli ballet dancer and teacher

- מיה ארבטובה
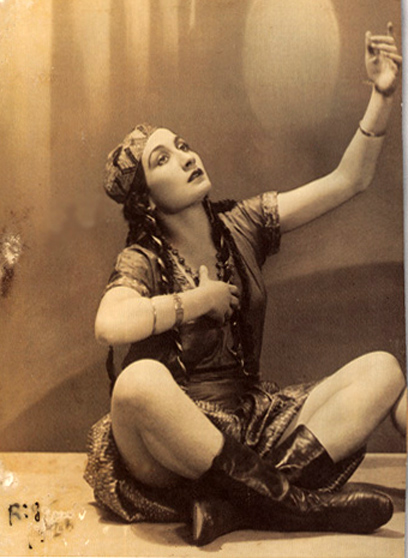
- Mia Arbatova, Riga 1928
- Born: Mia Hirschwald; March 4, 1911; Dribin, Mogilev Governorate, Russian Empire
- Died: 1990 (aged 78–79)
- Spouse: Josef Goland (m. 1907–1973)

Mia Arbatova (née Hirschwald) (Hebrew: מיה ארבטובה, Russian: Мия Арбатова; 4 March 1911 – 1990) was an Israeli ballet dancer and teacher. In Israel, she was one of the leading pioneers of classical ballet.

== Life ==
Arbatova was born in the town of Dribin in the Russian Empire, modern-day Belarus, in 1911. She was one of three daughters of chemist Ze’ev Hirschwald and Zila Schmulian-Hirschwald. Her father died when she was five.

Arbatova danced as the soloist in the Riga Opera Ballet for several years before she relocated to Palestine in 1938. Arbatova opened her own first ballet studio in a laundry in 1943 in Tel Aviv. Arbatova was honored by the Municipality of Tel Aviv-Yafo in 1985 with awarding her the title of Honorary Citizen of Tel Aviv for her contributions and continued efforts to the art of dance.

In 1989 Nira Paaz founded a ballet school in Arbatova's name. Arbatova died the following year, donating her body to science.

== Gallery ==
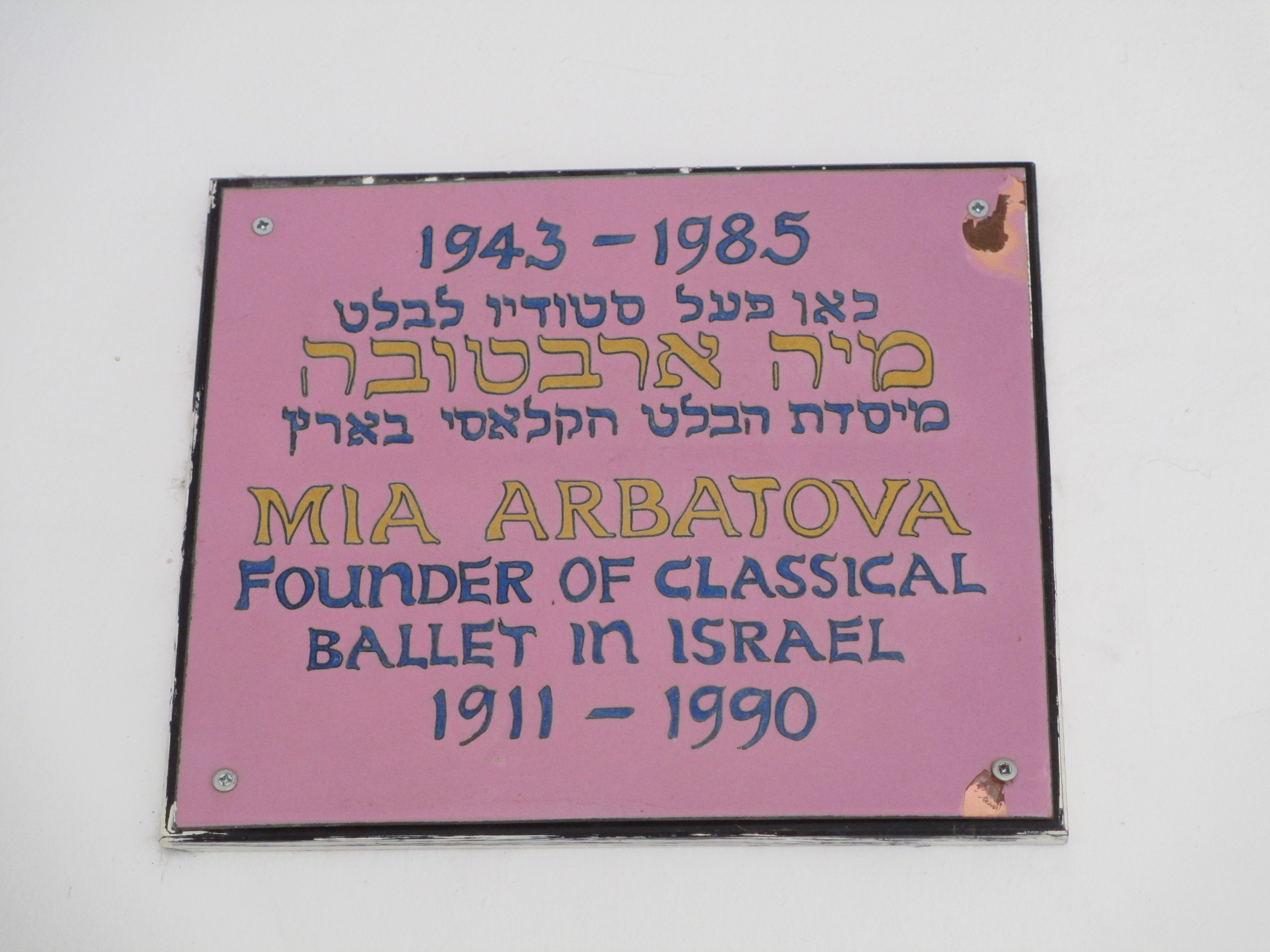
Mia Arbatova memorial plaque in Tel Aviv
