= Reuven Shefer =

Israeli actor

- ראובן שפר
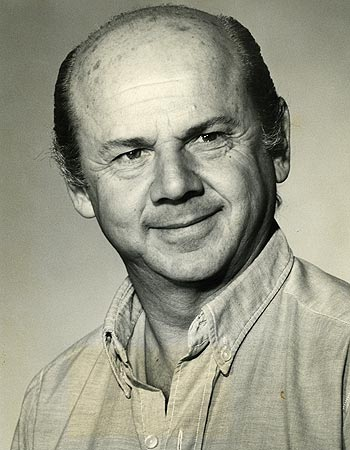
- Born: 7 June 1925; Tel Aviv, Mandate Palestine
- Died: 22 March 2011 (aged 85); Tel Aviv, Israel
- Occupation: Actor
- Years active: 1957–2011

Reuven Shefer (Hebrew: ראובן שפר; 7 June 1925 – 22 March 2011) was an Israeli theater and film actor.

== Biography ==
Shefer was born in Tel Aviv. In 1957 Shefer joined the band "The Theatre Club Quartet" (רביעיית מועדון התיאטרון). Shefer played through two decades in the Giora Godik Theater and the Haifa Theatre and in 1973 he joined the Cameri Theater. During his career Shefer played varied prominent roles in theater.

Through his career Shefer also acted in films including: Sallah Shabati (1964), Moishe Ventalator (1966), Ervinka (1967), Blaumilch Canal (1969), Azit the parachuting dog (1972), Salomonico (1974) and Charlie and a half (1974).

Shefer also dubbed cartoon series, such as Maya the Honey Bee (as Philip the top-hatted grasshopper), the TV series Pippi Longstocking, and Alice in Wonderland (as the Mad Hatter).

== Death ==
Shefer died on 22 March 2011 at his home in Tel Aviv at the age of 85. He was buried at Yarkon Cemetery.

== Filmography ==
Year	Title	Role	Notes
1964	Sallah Shabati		
1966	Moishe Ventalator		
1967	Ervinka		
1968	Nes B'Ayara		
1969	Blaumilch Canal		
1972	Salomonico		
1972	Azit the parachuting dog		
1974	Charlie and a half	Car Sales Man	
1999	Voyages	Lev	(final film role)

== See also ==
- Culture of Israel
- Cinema of Israel
