= 2025 in Israel =

- Decades: 2000s; 2010s; 2020s
- See also: History of Israel; Timeline of Israeli history; List of years in Israel

Events of the year 2025 in Israel.

The year saw a continuation of the Gaza war and the broader Middle Eastern crisis, including a failed strike on the Hamas leadership in Qatar in September. In Gaza, a truce agreement in January saw the release of 25 living Israeli hostages and a temporary ceasefire until it was broken by Israel in March. A Trump-brokered ceasefire agreement went into effect in October and saw the release of the final 20 living hostages as well as all but one hostage bodies. The Twelve-Day War between Iran and Israel broke out in June after Israel launched strikes targeting the Iranian nuclear program and military figures. A conflict with the Houthis in Yemen escalated, resulting in strikes that killed several Houthi leaders in August, while Israel continued its near-daily attacks in Lebanon as part of its conflict with Hezbollah, despite a ceasefire agreement in November 2024.

Within Israel, tensions rose within the Haredi Jewish population over a decision to draft ultra-Orthodox men into the military, with many refusing draft orders. Attempts to fire Shin Bet chief Ronen Bar led to his resignation in April, while escalated efforts to dismiss Attorney General Gali Baharav-Miara were rejected by the Supreme Court. A scandal broke out in November after Military Advocate General Yifat Tomer-Yerushalmi leaked a video showing the abuse of Palestinians at the Sde Teiman detention camp, resulting in her resignation and arrest.

== Incumbents ==
- President of Israel – Isaac Herzog
- Prime Minister of Israel – Benjamin Netanyahu
- President of the Supreme Court – Yitzhak Amit
- Chief of General Staff – Herzi Halevi until 5 March, Eyal Zamir
- Government of Israel – Thirty-seventh government of Israel

== Ongoing events ==
- Gaza war
- Israeli invasion of the Gaza Strip
- Gaza war protests in Israel
  - Israeli hostage deal protests

== Events ==
=== January ===
- 1 January – Former Defense Minister Yoav Gallant resigns from the Knesset.
- 5 January – The first 50 Haredi Jewish soldiers are drafted into the Hasmonean Brigade of the Israel Defense Forces (IDF).
- 6 January – Palestinian gunmen kill three Israelis and injure eight others in a mass shooting on a bus in al-Funduq, West Bank.
- 17 January –
  - The Cabinet of Israel approves a ceasefire and prisoner exchange deal with Hamas.
  - Defense Minister Israel Katz announces that all Israeli settlers in administrative detention will be released in response to the release of Palestinian prisoners in the ceasefire deal.
- 19 January –
  - The ceasefire and prisoner exchange deal with Hamas comes into effect. The first three female hostages are released by Hamas and returned to Israel.
  - Itamar Ben-Gvir resigns as Minister of National Security in protest against the ceasefire agreement with Hamas. Two other members of his Otzma Yehudit party—Heritage Minister Amihai Eliyahu and Negev, Galilee and National Resilience Minister Yitzhak Wasserlauf—resign from the coalition government alongside Ben-Gvir. Knesset members Zvika Fogel, Limor Son Har-Melech and Yitzhak Kroizer also resign from their positions.
  - The IDF announces that the body of Oron Shaul, who was killed and captured by Hamas during the 2014 Gaza War, was recovered in an operation in Northern Gaza.
- 20 January –
  - United States President Donald Trump signs an executive order lifting US sanctions on extremist Israeli settlers in the West Bank.
  - 90 Palestinian prisoners are released by Israel as part of the ceasefire agreement.
- 21 January –
  - Herzi Halevi announces his resignation as IDF chief of staff effective 6 March to take responsibility for the IDF's failure to prevent the October 7 attacks. Head of the Southern Command Yaron Finkelman also announces his resignation for the same reason.
  - The IDF conducts drone strikes and a ground raid in Jenin in a counterterrorism operation codenamed "Iron Wall", killing at least eight Palestinians and injuring 35.
  - The Knesset plenum passes a law criminalizing denial, trivialization, and celebration of the 7 October Hamas attack.
  - Four people are injured in a knife attack in Tel Aviv. The attacker, a Moroccan citizen with US residency, is shot dead.
- 25 January –
  - Four female IDF soldiers captured by Hamas during the 7 October attacks, including Naama Levy, are released by the group as part of the ceasefire agreement.
  - Two hundred Palestinian prisoners are released by Israel as part of the ceasefire agreement with Hamas.
- 26 January –
  - The initial deadline for Israeli forces to leave southern Lebanon under the 2024 Israel–Lebanon ceasefire agreement expires and is extended to 18 February.
  - Acting president Yitzhak Amit is elected as the permanent President of the Supreme Court after a delay of 16 months.
- 30 January –
  - Three Israelis and five Thais captured by Hamas during the 7 October attacks are released by the group as part of the ceasefire agreement.
  - 110 Palestinian prisoners are released by Israel as part of the ceasefire agreement.

=== February ===
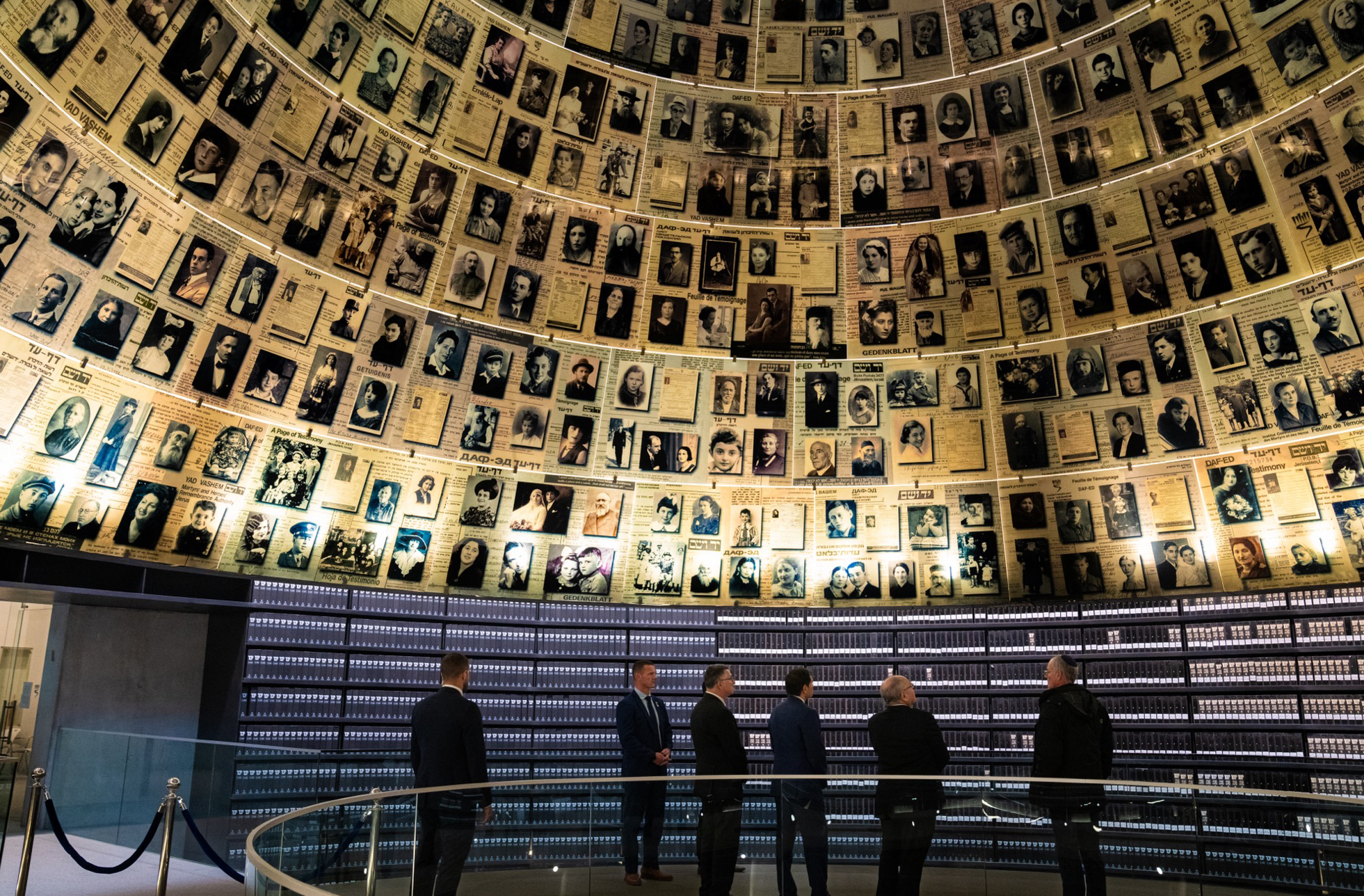
US Secretary of State Marco Rubio and Israeli Foreign Minister Gideon Sa'ar at Yad Vashem in Jerusalem

- 1 February –
  - Three Israelis captured by Hamas during the 7 October attacks are released by the group as part of the ceasefire agreement.
  - 183 Palestinian prisoners are released by Israel as part of the ceasefire agreement.
  - Prime Minister Netanyahu appoints retired Major General Eyal Zamir as IDF chief of staff.
- 4 February – Two soldiers and a Palestinian gunman are killed and eight soldiers are injured, two seriously, in a shooting at the Tayasir checkpoint in the West Bank.
- 5 February –
  - Foreign minister Gideon Sa'ar announces Israel's withdrawal from the United Nations Human Rights Council over perceived discrimination against Israel.
  - A woman in Eilat dies from hypothermia during a winter storm that swept across Israel.
- 6 February – US president Donald Trump imposes sanctions against the International Criminal Court in part over its issuance of an arrest warrant against Netanyahu over alleged war crimes committed in Gaza.
- 8 February –
  - 183 Palestinian prisoners are released by Israel as part of the ceasefire agreement.
  - Three Israelis captured by Hamas during the 7 October attacks are released by the group as part of the ceasefire agreement.
- 13 February – Yitzhak Amit is sworn in as President of the Supreme Court in a ceremony boycotted by Prime Minister Netanyahu, Justice Minister Yariv Levin, and Speaker of the Knesset Amir Ohana.
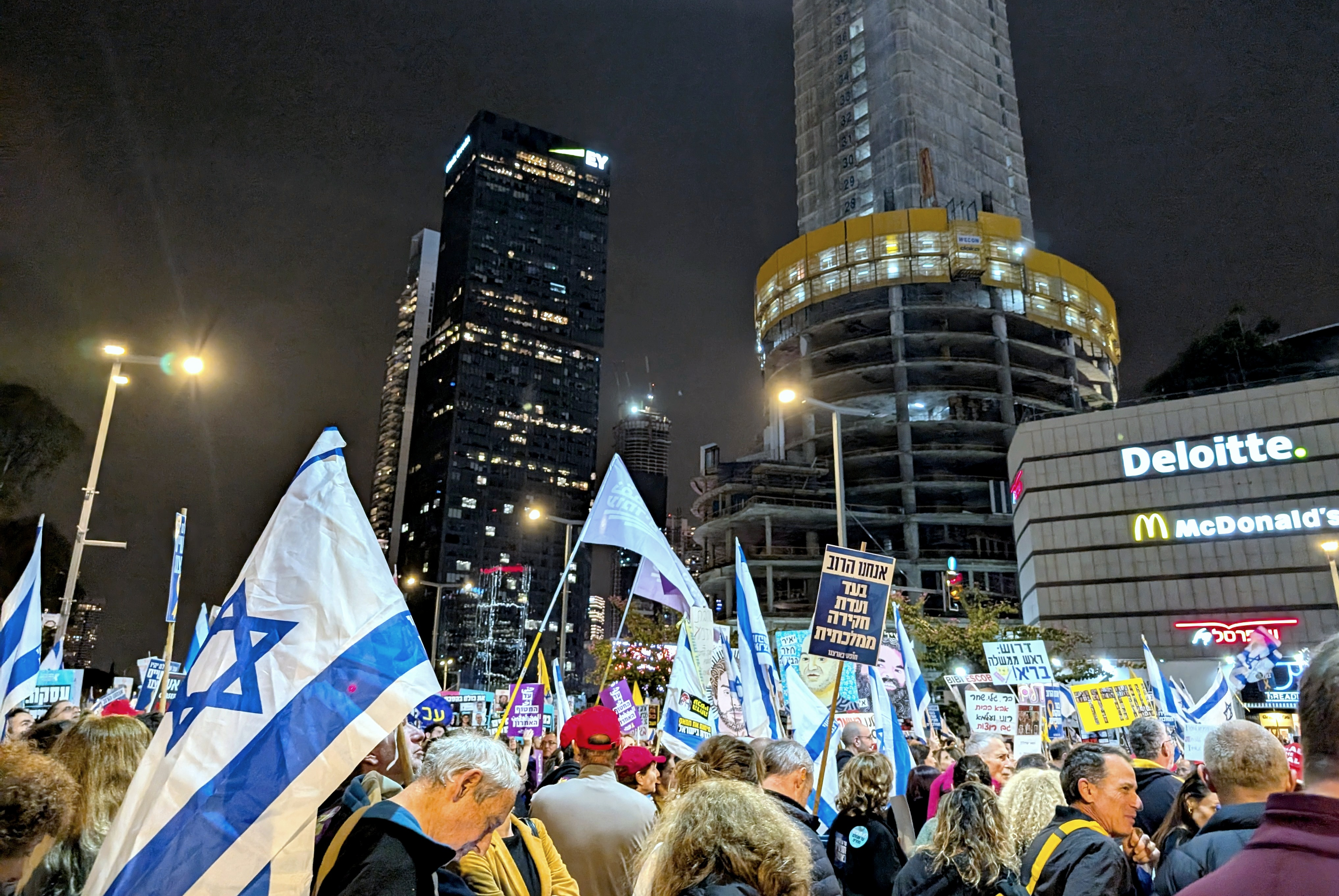
  Rally for the return of the hostages, Tel Aviv, 15 February 2025
- 15 February –
  - 369 Palestinian prisoners are released by Israel as part of the ceasefire agreement.
  - Three Israelis captured by Hamas and Palestinian Islamic Jihad during the 7 October attacks are released by both groups as part of the ceasefire agreement.
- 16 February –
  - An American shipment of 1,800 Mark 84 2,000-lb bombs arrives in the Port of Ashdod.
  - The IDF completes its probes into the 7 October attacks and announces that its findings will presented starting the following week.
- 18 February – The IDF withdraws from all but five positions in southern Lebanon under the 2024 Israel–Lebanon ceasefire agreement which expires the same day.
- 19 February – A 70-year-old Jewish woman is injured in an axe attack in the Old City of Jerusalem after being mistaken as a Christian. The perpetrator is later arrested in northern Israel.
- 20 February –
  - Hamas returns the bodies of Kfir and Ariel Bibas and Oded Lifshitz, who were captured during the 7 October attacks but later died in captivity, as part of the ceasefire agreement. A fourth body, which Hamas claimed was Shiri Bibas, is later found to have been misidentified as a hostage. Hamas subsequently says that Shiri's remains had been mixed with those of other victims following an Israeli airstrike and that it will examine allegations over Shiri's remains, while asking Israel to return the body, which it identifies as a Palestinian woman.
  - The Knesset passes a law imposing an entry ban into Israel for people who deny the Holocaust and the 7 October attacks, as well as those who support legal punishment against Israelis over actions committed during IDF service.
  - Three buses explode and two explosive devices are found by authorities in a suspected militant attack in Bat Yam. No casualties are reported.
- 21 February – Hamas says that it had handed over the remains of Shiri Bibas, which are subsequently identified by forensic experts.
- 22 February – Four Israelis captured by Hamas during the 7 October attacks and two others held in captivity after entering the Gaza Strip on their own in 2014 and 2015 are released by the group as part of the ceasefire agreement. They are the final living hostages held by Hamas to be released in the first phase of the deal.
- 24 February – MEPs Rima Hassan and Lynn Boylan are denied entry to Israel as part of an EU-Palestine delegation, with Israeli authorities citing Hassan's support for anti-Israel boycotts.
- 25 February – The IDF launches airstrikes on military installations outside Damascus and in Daraa Governorate in southern Syria, killing at least two people.
- 27 February –
  - Hamas returns the bodies of four hostages captured during the 7 October attacks but later died in captivity, as part of the ceasefire agreement.
  - More than 600 Palestinian prisoners are released by Israel as part of the ceasefire agreement.
  - A combined vehicle ramming and stabbing attack in Pardes Hanna-Karkur injures 13 people, including a teenage girl who died six days later. The attacker is shot and killed by police.
  - The IDF releases its internal report into the October 7 attacks.
  - Attorney General Gali Baharav-Miara orders a criminal investigation into alleged links between Prime Minister's Office officials and Qatar.

=== March ===
- 2 March –
  - Israel blocks all humanitarian aid from entering the Gaza Strip after Hamas refuses to temporarily extend the first phase of the ceasefire.
  - No Other Land, a documentary directed by two Israeli and two Palestinian filmmakers about Israeli demolitions in Masafer Yatta, West Bank, wins an Oscar for Best Documentary at the 97th Academy Awards.
- 3 March –
  - A stabbing spree by a mentally ill German-Israeli Druze assailant at the Haifa Bay central bus station kills one person and injures four others with the attacker shot and killed by a bus station security guard and an armed passerby. The victim was identified as Hassan Karim Dahamsheh, a 70-year-old resident of Kafr Kanna, Galilee.
  - Israel assumes presidency of the International Holocaust Remembrance Alliance, with Dani Dayan being appointed as chairman.
- 5 March – Eyal Zamir is officially appointed as the 24th Chief of the General Staff, succeeding Herzi Halevi.
- 11 March –
  - Opposition MKs Gilad Kariv, Karine Elharrar, and Yoav Segalovitz file an unprecedented 71,023 reservations to a proposed judicial reform bill.
  - The Yemeni Houthis announce that they will continue their attacks against Israeli ships in response to Israel's ban of aid to Gaza.
  - Four captives taken by Israel during its war against Hezbollah are released and repatriated to Lebanon.
- 13 March –
  - The UN's Independent International Commission of Inquiry on the Occupied Palestinian Territory accuses Israel of committing genocidal acts by destroying health facilities and of using sexual violence as a strategy of war during the Gaza war, which Israel denies.
  - The IDF carries out an airstrike on the home of PIJ leader Ziyad al-Nakhalah in Damascus, killing one person.
  - A fifth Lebanese captive taken by Israel during its war against Hezbollah is released and repatriated.
  - Foreign minister Gideon Sa'ar announces that Israel sent 10,000 humanitarian aid packages to the Druze community in southern Syria in recent weeks.
- 14 March – A group of 60 Syrian Druze clerics enter Israel to make pilgrimage to Nabi Shu'ayb, marking the first time Druze figures crossed into Israel from Syria since 1948.
- 18 March –
  - Israel conducts extensive strikes across Gaza after accusing Hamas of rejecting hostage deal proposals from mediators, killing at least 400 people.
  - In the largest purchase of an Israeli technology company, Alphabet Inc. reaches a deal to buy cloud security company Wiz, Inc. for $32 billion USD.
  - Gal Gadot becomes the first Israeli actor to receive a star on the Hollywood Walk of Fame.
- 19 March –
  - Over 40,000 people in and around Habima Square and tens of thousands in Jerusalem protest against Netanyahu's intentions to fire Ronen Bar as the chief of the Shin Bet.
  - Israel resumes its ground offensive in Gaza, partially retaking the Netzarim Corridor.
- 20 March – Ronen Bar is dismissed as head of the Shin Bet by Netanyahu, citing "persistent loss of professional and personal trust" during the Gaza war. However, the dismissal is suspended by the Supreme Court of Israel the next day.
- 22 March – In the first rocket attack from Lebanon since December 2024, at least five rockets are fired at Metula, causing no casualties. In response, the IDF launches airstrikes on southern Lebanon, killing one person.
- 27 March – The Knesset approves a judicial reform law increasing powers by elected officials to select judges.
- 31 March – Netanyahu appoints former Israeli Navy commander Eli Sharvit to head the Shin Bet, defying the Supreme Court order suspending the dismissal of his predecessor Ronen Bar. However, the appointment is rescinded by Netanyahu the next day.

=== April ===
- 3 April – Netanyahu visits Hungary in his first trip to a member state of the International Criminal Court since it issued arrest warrants against him.
- 5 April – British MPs Yuan Yang and Abtisam Mohamed are denied entry and deported from Israel upon arrival, with the Israeli government accusing them of seeking to "spread anti-Israel hatred".
- 10 April – The IDF announces that it will dismiss hundreds of Israeli Air Force reservists who signed a letter calling for an end to the Gaza war.
- 12 April – Hapoel Tel Aviv B.C. wins the EuroCup Basketball after beating CB Gran Canaria, marking the first time an Israeli team won the tournament.
- 15 April – The Maldives passes legislation banning the entry of Israeli citizens into the country.
- 20 April –
  - The deputy commander of the Golani Brigade's reconnaissance division is dismissed over the killing of 15 paramedics in Rafah by the IDF on 23 March.
  - The government cancels the visas of 27 French MPs and local politicians on suspicion of acting against Israel.
- 21 April – One person is killed off the coast of Hadera in the country's first fatal shark attack.
- 23 April – A wildfire breaks out in the area of Beit Shemesh, lightly injuring nine people and causing several towns to be evacuated.
- 24 April – Nechama Grossman, the oldest known Holocaust survivor in Israel, dies at 109.
- 28 April – Ronen Bar tenders his resignation as director of the Shin Bet effective 15 June, citing responsibility for failing to prevent the 7 October attacks.
- 29 April – The Central Bureau of Statistics reports that the total population of Israel and its settlements in the occupied West Bank surpassed 10 million since last year's Independence Day.
- 30 April – At least 5,000 acres (20 km^{2}) of land are destroyed in one of the largest wildfires in Israel's history, injuring over a dozen people and causing the evacuation of several towns near Jerusalem.

=== May ===
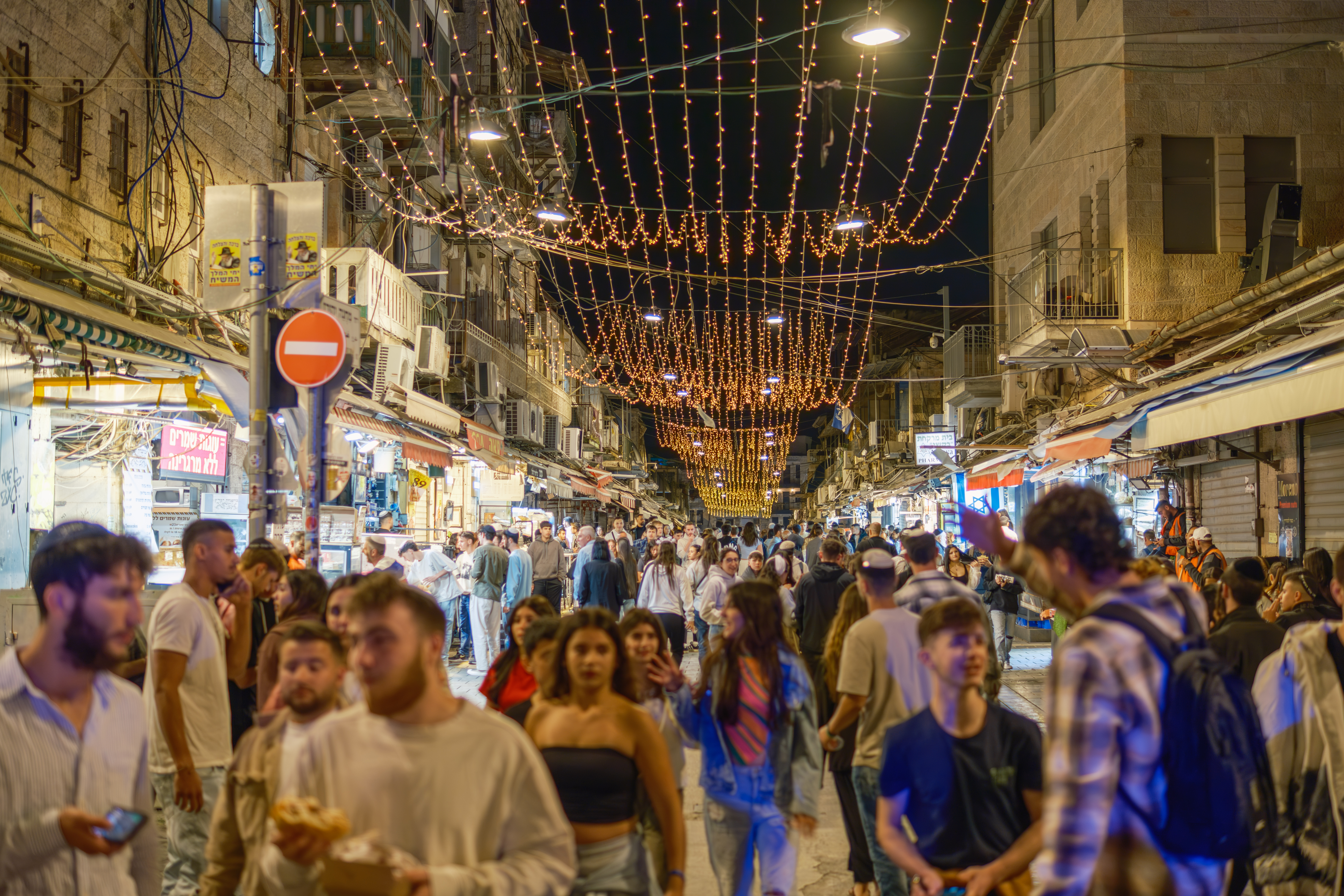
Jaffa Road in Jerusalem on 1 May 2025

- 4 May – A Houthi ballistic missile strikes the area of Ben Gurion Airport, injuring eight people and briefly halting the airport's operations.
- 5 May – Israel launches airstrikes on the Hudaydah Port and nearby Bajil in Yemen in retaliation to the attack on Ben-Gurion Airport the previous day.
- 6 May – Israel launches airstrikes on the Sanaa International Airport in Yemen, leaving the facility "completely destroyed", according to an official.
- 7 May – One person is killed and nine others are injured after a boat capsizes off Eilat.
- 11 May – The body of Zvi Feldman, a missing in action soldier killed during the battle of Sultan Yacoub of the 1982 Lebanon War, is recovered from Syria by the IDF and Mossad.
- 12 May – Edan Alexander, an Israeli-American soldier held captive in Gaza, is released by Hamas and returned to Israel following a deal mediated by the United States.
- 14 May – A pregnant Israeli woman is killed and her husband is lightly injured in a shooting by a Palestinian gunman in the West Bank settlement of Brukhin. The woman's baby, who was delivered in an emergency C-section, dies on 29 May after two weeks in serious condition.
- 16 May –
  - The IDF launches the first phases of Operation Gideon's Chariots, a major military offensive seeking to "seize strategic areas" in Gaza.
  - An East Jerusalem man stabs a police officer in the Old City, injuring him, before being shot dead by officers.
- 17 May – Yuval Raphael, representing Israel in the Eurovision Song Contest 2025, achieves first place in the public vote and second place overall with her song "New Day Will Rise".
- 18 May –
  - The Prime Minister's Office announces that the Mossad recovered 2,500 items and documents belonging to Israeli spy Eli Cohen from Syria in a covert operation.
  - Netanyahu orders that the delivery of "basic" humanitarian aid to Gaza be resumed, ending the two-month total blockade.
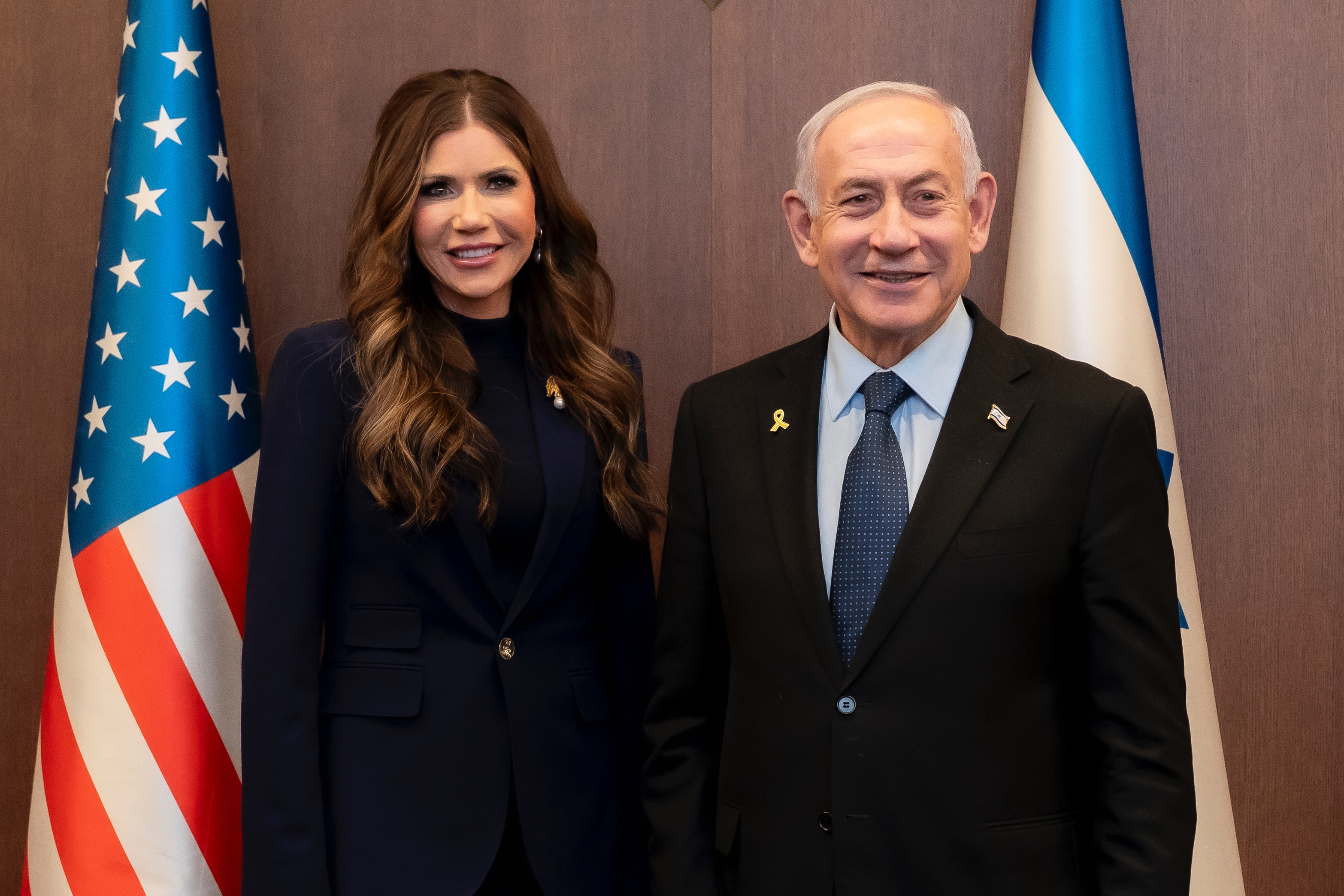
    DHS Secretary Kristi Noem meeting with Israeli Prime Minister Benjamin Netanyahu in Jerusalem, 25 May 2025
- 20 May – The United Kingdom sanctions two Israeli outposts and three "extremist" settlers, including settler leader Daniella Weiss. It also suspends trade talks with Israel due to its offensive in Gaza.
- 21 May –
  - The IDF fires warning shots near a delegation consisting of diplomats from almost two dozen countries visiting Jenin, claiming that they deviated from an approved route and entered an unauthorized area. It later apologizes for the incident.
  - The Supreme Court declares Netanyahu's dismissal of Shin Bet director Ronen Bar in March "unlawful".
  - Two employees of the Israeli embassy in Washington DC are shot dead in an attack believed to have been carried out by a man yelling "free Palestine".
  - More than a dozen governments condemn the Israeli military firing in the direction of a diplomatic delegation with representatives from 31 countries including Belgium, Canada, China, Denmark, Egypt, the European Union, Finland, France, Germany, Ireland, Italy, Jordan, the Netherlands, Portugal, Russia, Spain, Turkey, the United Kingdom, and Uruguay.
  - Canada, France, Italy, Spain, the UK, and Uruguay summon their Israeli ambassadors over the incident in the occupied West Bank. Canada, the EU, and Turkey call for the launch of an official investigation.
- 22 May – Netanyahu appoints major general David Zini as the next Shin Bet chief.
- 28 May – Thousands of people across Israel protest in support of a hostage deal to mark the 600th day of the Gaza war, including 3,000 in Hostages Square. During the protests, 62 people are arrested after storming Metzudat Ze'ev, the Likud headquarters.
- 29 May – The Ministry of Defense announces that the government approved the establishment of 22 settlements in the West Bank.
- 31 May – The IDF says that Hamas leader Mohammed Sinwar was assassinated in an airstrike on 13 May.

=== June ===
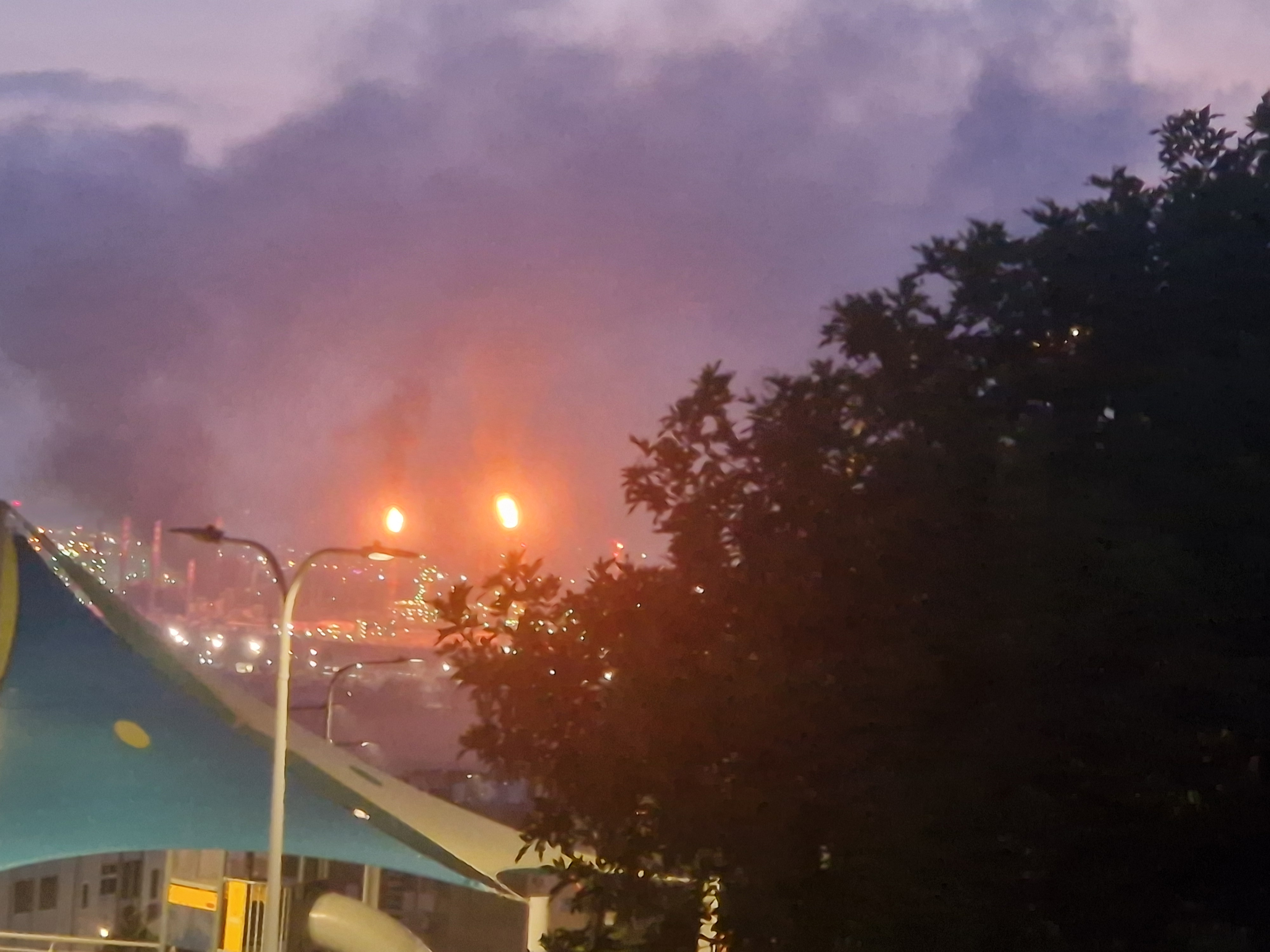
Iran's attack on Haifa oil refineries on the night of 15 to 16 June 2025

- 3 June – Militants fire rockets at the Israeli-occupied Golan Heights from Syria for the first time since the fall of the Assad regime, causing no casualties.
- 9 June – The Madleen, which was en route to Gaza in an attempt to break the blockade and carried prominent activists such as Greta Thunberg and Rima Hassan, is raided by Israeli forces and diverted to Israel, with its passengers detained. Thunberg and several passengers are deported from Israel the next day.
- 10 June –
  - The Israeli Navy launches attacks on Houthi territory in Yemen for the first time, targeting the port of Hodeidah.
  - The UK, Canada, Australia, New Zealand, and Norway announce travel bans and sanctions against far-right ministers Bezalel Smotrich and Itamar Ben-Gvir, accusing them of inciting settler violence against Palestinians in the West Bank.
  - In response to the sanctions, Smotrich orders the cancellation of a policy allowing correspondence between Israeli and Palestinian Authority banks, which is crucial for sustaining the Palestinian economy.
- 11 June – The Knesset votes 61–53 against a bill to dissolve the Netanyahu government and force early elections.
- 12 June –
  - Argentine President Javier Milei is awarded the Genesis Prize by Israel in a ceremony in Jerusalem.
  - Housing and Construction Minister and United Torah Judaism leader Yitzhak Goldknopf resigns from the government after the failure of a bill exempting most Haredi men from mandatory IDF service.
  - The United Nations General Assembly votes 149–12 in support of a ceasefire in Gaza, with 19 countries abstaining.
- 13 June –
  - Israel conducts airstrikes against Iran's nuclear program and military leadership, killing key Iranian commanders such as Hossein Salami and Mohammad Bagheri. A state of emergency is declared in anticipation of an Iranian response.
  - Iran launches airstrikes at Israel in response to the previous airstrikes.
- 15 June – Ronen Bar's term as the chief of the Shin Bet ends, and his deputy, who is identified only by the Hebrew initial "Shin", takes over as the acting chief.
- 24 June – A ceasefire announced by US President Donald Trump to end the Twelve-Day War comes into effect.

=== July ===
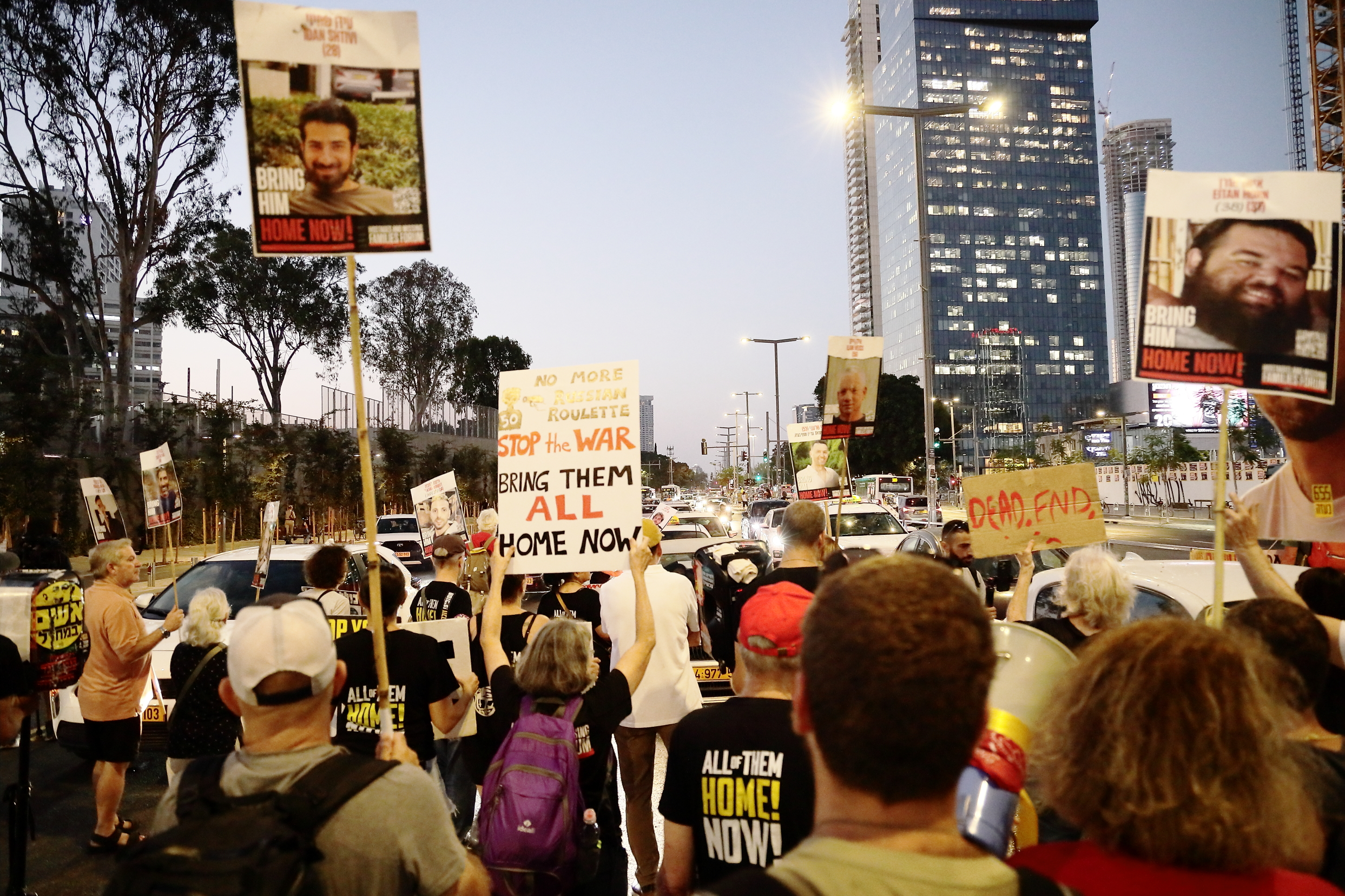
Anti-war protest in Tel Aviv, 22 July 2025

- 7 July – Israel launches aerial attacks on Houthi territory in Yemen.
- 11 July – Sayfollah Musallet, a 20 year-old Palestinian American is beaten to death by Israeli settlers in Sinjil, West Bank during a confrontation with Palestinian locals.
- 14 July –
  - An attempt to expel Arab Hadash–Ta'al MK Ayman Odeh from the Knesset fails, with only 73 out of the required 90 lawmakers voting in favor of the motion.
  - United Torah Judaism leaves the government and Netanyahu's coalition amidst a dispute over Haredi conscription into the IDF.
- 16 July –
  - Israel launches airstrikes on the Syrian Ministry of Defense building in Damascus amidst deadly clashes between Druze and government forces in Suwayda.
  - Shas leaves the government and Netanyahu's coalition amidst a dispute over Haredi conscription into the IDF.
- 17 July – Slovenia imposes sanctions on National Security Minister Itamar Ben Gvir and Finance Minister Bezalel Smotrich and declares them "persona non grata" over their role in human rights violations against Palestinians.
- 24 July – Eight IDF soldiers are injured in a car-ramming at a bus stop at the Beit Lid junction near Kfar Yona.
- 28 July – The Netherlands bars entry to Israeli National Security Minister Itamar Ben Gvir and Finance Minister Bezalel Smotrich over their role in human rights violations against Palestinians.
- 30 July –
  - Slovenia imposes a complete ban on the import, export, and transit of arms and military equipment to and from Israel over its actions in the Gaza War.
  - Israeli tech firm CyberArk is acquired by Palo Alto Networks for US$25 million, in the second largest purchase of an Israeli company.
- 31 July –
  - Israel evacuates most of its diplomatic staff in the United Arab Emirates, including its ambassador, after warning of heightened efforts to attack Israelis in the country.
  - The United States imposes a 15% tariff on Israeli products as part of a trade policy imposed by the Trump administration.

=== August ===
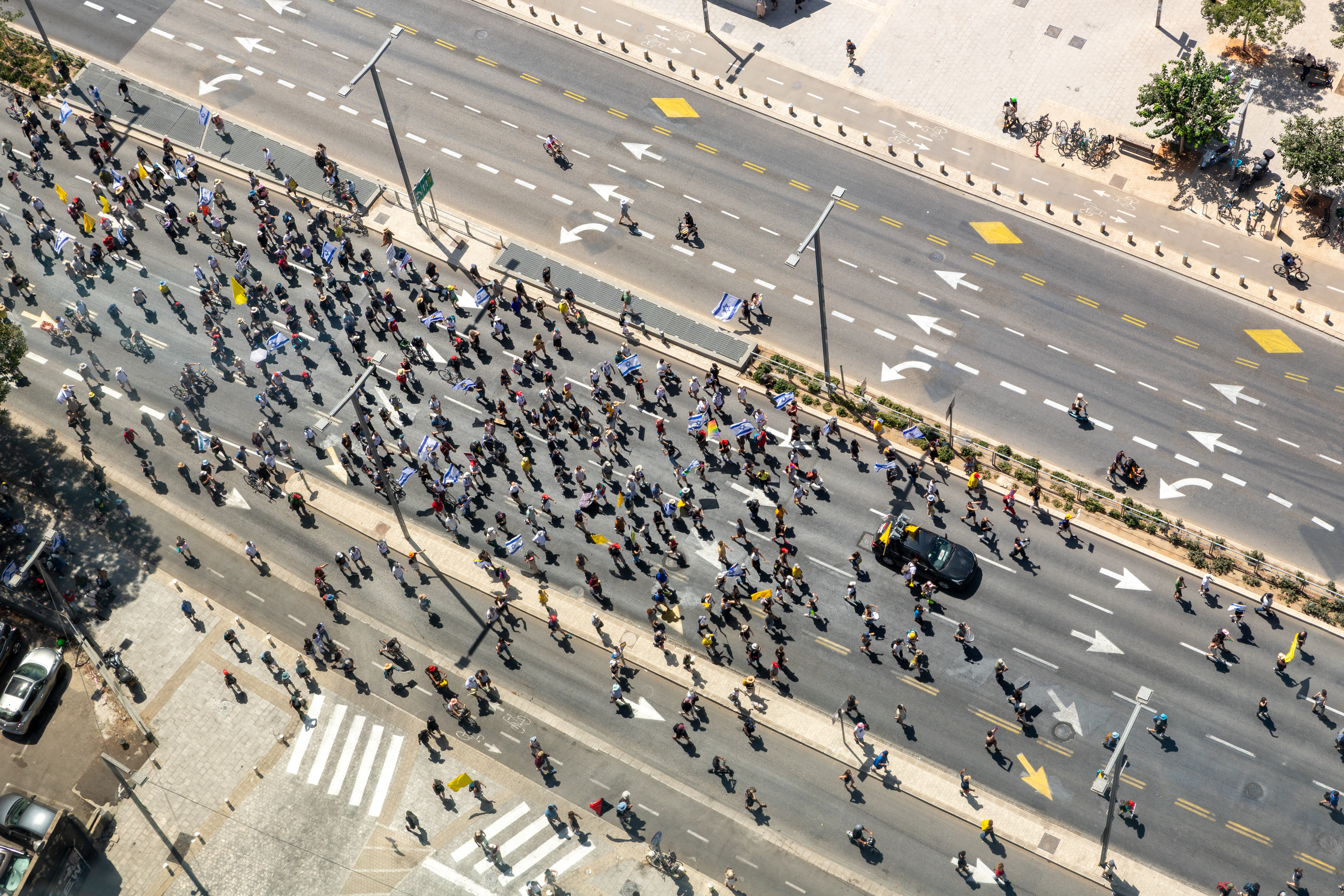
Demonstration on Begin Road calling for the release of Israeli hostages held by Hamas, 17 August 2025

- 1 August – An employee of the Jerusalem Biblical Zoo dies after being mauled by a tiger that had escaped from its enclosure.
- 4 August – The Cabinet unanimously votes to dismiss Gali Baharav-Miara as Attorney General. The decision is suspended by the Supreme Court pending a review.
- 8 August – Germany imposes an arms embargo to Israel in response to the latter's conduct in the Gaza war.
- 16 August – The Israeli Navy carries out airstrikes on the Hezyaz power plant near Sanaa, Yemen.
- 17 August – Hundreds of thousands of Israelis protest across the country amidst a nationwide general strike, calling for an end to the Gaza war and release of the hostages. At least 39 protesters are arrested.
- 18 August – Australia bars far-right MK Simcha Rothman from entering the country, prompting Israel to revoke the visas of Australian representatives to the Palestinian Authority in response.
- 20 August – Israel carries out a new offensive to occupy Gaza City.
- 21 August – An Israeli citizen detained by Lebanese forces after illegally crossing the Israel–Lebanon border in 2024 is returned to Israel.
- 24 August – The IAF strikes several targets in Sanaa, killing ten and wounding 102, after the Houthis fire a cluster bomb at Israel for the first time.
- 25 August – Syria accuses Israel of sending 60 soldiers to seize its territory in the Mount Hermon area.
- 26 August – Israel carries out drone strikes in Al-Kiswah, Syria, killing eight soldiers.
- 28 August – Israel assassinates Houthi prime minister Ahmed al-Rahawi and several other ministers of the group in an airstrike in Sanaa.
- 29 August – Turkey imposes a trade ban on Israel, closing its ports to Israeli ships and barring aircraft affiliated with government officials and arms shipments from its airspace.

=== September ===
- 2 September – Belgium imposes sanctions on Israel, including banning products from Israeli settlements and restricting certain public contracts.
- 7 September –
  - The passenger terminal of Ramon Airport in Eilat is damaged by a Houthi drone attack, injuring two people.
  - The Supreme Court of Israel expresses "real doubts" that Palestinian prisoners were eating properly, and orders the prison service to ensure that the food served meets "basic subsistence conditions in accordance with the law".
- 8 September –
  - Two Palestinian gunmen kill six people and injure ten others in a mass shooting at a bus stop in Ramot Junction, Jerusalem. The attackers are shot and killed by a soldier and an armed civilian.
  - Spain announces that it would impose a total weapons embargo on Israel over its conduct in the Gaza war.
- 9 September –
  - Israel carries out an airstrike on Hamas political leaders in Doha who met to discuss an active truce-hostage deal proposal presented by the US. The targeted members survive, but six others are killed.
  - The IDF launches airstrikes in Homs and Latakia in Syria.
  - Spain bars Israeli ministers Itamar Ben-Gvir and Bezalel Smotrich from entering the country over their role in the Gaza war.
  - Israeli-Russian graduate student Elizabeth Tsurkov is released after being held captive by Iraqi militant group Kata'ib Hezbollah since March 2023.
- 10 September – Israel carries out airstrikes on Houthi targets in Sanaa and Al Jawf Governorate in Yemen, killing 35 people and injuring over 130 others.
- 15 September –
  - Israeli fraudster Simon Leviev, subject of the 2022 Netflix documentary The Tinder Swindler, is arrested in Georgia at the request of Interpol.
  - Israel begins a ground offensive in Gaza City amidst its operation to capture the city.
- 16 September –
  - The United Nations commission of inquiry on Palestine accuses Israel of committing "four of the five genocidal acts defined under international law" against Palestinians during its war in Gaza.
  - Israel carries out airstrikes on Houthi targets in Hodeida, Yemen.
- 17 September –
  - Fiji becomes the seventh country to open its embassy to Israel in Jerusalem.
  - The Iron Beam, a high-powered laser air defense system, is declared operational by the Ministry of Defense.
- 18 September –
  - Two Israeli soldiers are shot and stabbed to death at the Allenby Bridge border crossing between the West Bank and Jordan, by a Jordanian truck driver transporting aid for the Gaza Strip who is then shot dead by Israeli forces.
  - A Houthi drone hits Eilat.
- 24 September –
  - A Houthi drone hits Eilat, injuring 20 people.
  - Israel indefinitely closes the Allenby Bridge.
- 25 September – The IAF bombs Houthi targets in Sanaa with 65 munitions, in its largest operation in Yemen to date.
- 29 September – Prime minister Netanyahu apologizes to Qatari Prime Minister Mohammed bin Abdulrahman bin Jassim Al Thani for violating Qatari sovereignty during the 2025 Israeli strike on Doha.
- 30 September – The Cabinet unanimously votes to appoint David Zini as chief of the Shin Bet.

=== October ===
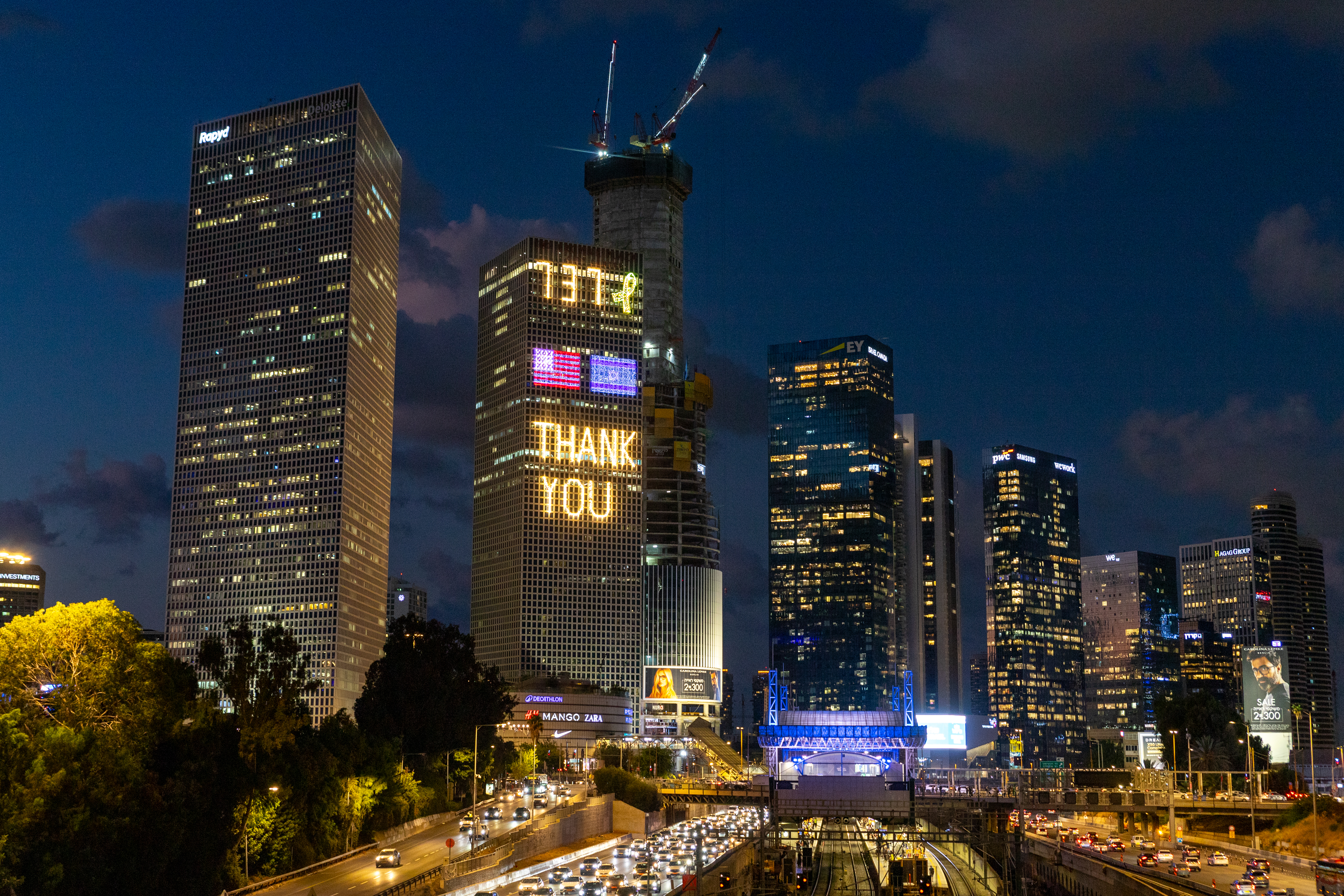
Azrieli Center illuminated with the American and Israeli flag, marking the return of Israeli hostages held in Gaza, 12 October 2025

- 1 October – The Israeli Navy intercepts the Global Sumud Flotilla off the coast of Gaza as it attempts to break the blockade of the Strip.
- 7 October – The second National Memorial Ceremony of October 7 Families takes place in Tel Aviv, marking two years that passed since the massacre.
- 8 October – The IDF intercepts the Freedom Flotilla Coalition & Thousand Madleens in the Mediterranean Sea as it attempts to break the blockade of the Gaza Strip.
- 9 October – Indonesia refuses entry to athletes of the Israel Gymnastics Federation competing at the 2025 World Artistic Gymnastics Championships in Jakarta, citing its longstanding policy with regards to Palestine.
- 10 October – The Netanyahu cabinet ratifies a ceasefire agreement with Hamas. The ceasefire later goes into effect.
- 13 October –
  - All 20 remaining living Israeli hostages taken by Hamas to the Gaza Strip in the 7 October attacks and four deceased hostages are released by Hamas in exchange for hundreds of Palestinian prisoners held by Israel as part of the ceasefire agreement.
  - Israel releases 1,968 Palestinian prisoners, including 250 security prisoners; many of whom were serving life sentences.
  - American-Israeli economist Joel Mokyr is awarded the Nobel Prize for Economics for his work on "innovation-driven economic growth".
  - Donald Trump addresses the Knesset in the first time a US president has done so since 2008.
- 14 October – Hamas releases the bodies of four apparent Israeli hostages, which are sent to the Abu Kabir Forensic Institute for identification. One of the bodies is found not to be that of a hostage following tests.
- 15 October – Hamas releases the bodies of two Israeli hostages, which the group says were the final bodies that it could recover.
- 16 October – Houthi military chief of staff Muhammad Abd al-Karim al-Ghamari succumbs to wounds sustained in an Israeli strike in August.
- 19 October – Eight people, including three police officers, are injured in clashes ahead of the Tel Aviv derby between Maccabi Tel Aviv and Hapoel Tel Aviv at the Bloomfield Stadium, resulting in the cancellation of the match.
- 21 October – Netanyahu fires head of the National Security Council Tzachi Hanegbi.
- 30 October – Hundreds of thousands of Haredi Jews take part in a mass protest against proposed changes to long-standing military draft exemptions for full-time yeshiva students.
- 31 October – IDF chief lawyer Yifat Tomer-Yerushalmi resigns during an investigation into the leaking of a video showing soldiers sexually assaulting a detained Palestinian in the Sde Teiman detention camp. She is subsequently arrested on 3 November.

=== November ===
- 7 November – Turkey issues arrest warrants to 37 Israeli officials for crimes against humanity in the Gaza war, including Prime Minister Benjamin Netanyahu, Defence Minister Israel Katz, National Security Minister Itamar Ben-Gvir and IDF chief Lieutenant General Eyal Zamir.
- 9 November – Hamas returns the remains of IDF soldier Hadar Goldin, who was killed and captured by the group during the 2014 Gaza War, to Israel.
- 11 November –
  - Minister of Strategic Affairs Ron Dermer announces his resignation.
  - Actress Gal Gadot is awarded the Genesis Prize.
- 18 November – One Israeli is killed while three others are injured in a ramming and stabbing attack at the Gush Etzion Junction in the West Bank.
- 23 November –
  - Israel carries out an airstrike targeting Haytham Ali Tabatabai, the chief of staff of Hezbollah, in Haret Hreik, Lebanon, killing him and four others.
  - IDF chief Eyal Zamir orders the dismissal of seven senior commanders over their failure to prevent the 7 October attacks.
- 28 November – An Israeli raid in Beit Jinn, Syria, aiming to arrest two Jama'a Islamiya members results in deadly clashes, killing 13 Syrians and injuring 24, while six IDF soldiers are also injured.
- 30 November – Benjamin Netanyahu formally applies for a pardon from president Herzog over his corruption cases.

=== December ===
- 3 December –
  - The first direct negotiations between Lebanon and Israel since 1983 are held at UNIFIL headquarters in Naqoura.
  - President Trump's 20-point Gaza plan is formally approved by the Knesset.
- 4 December – The European Broadcasting Union approves Israel's participation in Eurovision Song Contest 2026, leading Ireland, the Netherlands, Slovenia, and Spain to withdraw from the event in protest.
- 7 December – The Ghanaian government accuses Israeli authorities of mistreating several Ghanaian nationals at Ben Gurion Airport, including four members of a parliamentary delegation attending an international cybersecurity conference in Tel Aviv.
- 9 December – Bolivia restores diplomatic relations with Israel for the first time since 2023.
- 15 December – An Israeli man, suspected to be mentally ill, is shot and injured by Israeli forces after attempting to stab a soldier at a gas station near Kedumim.
- 17 December – Netanyahu approves a deal to export US$35 billion of natural gas to Egypt over the next 15 years.
- 18 December – Haredi rioters attack police officers who attempted to issue a parking ticket in Jerusalem, injuring 13.
- 21 December – The government announces its intention to establish 11 settlements and legalize eight outposts in the West Bank.
- 22 December – The Cabinet unanimously votes to shut down Israeli Army Radio by 1 March 2026.
- 23 December – The Knesset votes in favor of extending a law allowing the shutdown of foreign media outlets on national security grounds until 2027 and introduces amendments allowing for its application in the absence of a state of emergency.
- 26 December –
  - Israel becomes the first country to formally recognize Somaliland as an independent nation.
  - Two people are killed and two others are injured in a combined vehicle ramming and stabbing attack near Beit She'an and along Highway 71.
- 28 December –
  - The IDF announces that a trilateral defense deal was signed between Israel, Cyprus, and Greece the week prior.
  - The Abraham Initiatives reports that 2025 was the deadliest year recorded for Arab citizens of Israel, with 252 Arabs killed in violent incidents.

== Art and entertainment ==
- List of Israeli submissions for the Academy Award for Best International Feature Film

== Major economic deals ==
=== March ===
- 17 March - Google agrees to acquire Wiz, Inc. for US$32 billion.
- 20 March - Munich Re announces the purchase of Next Insurance for US$2.6 billion.

=== June ===
- 25 June - Xero announces the purchase of Melio for US$3 billion.
- 30 June - Rafael Advanced Defense Systems sells defense system to Romania in US$2.2 billion deal.

=== July ===
- 30 July - Palo Alto Networks announces intention to buy CyberArk in a US$25 billion deal.

=== August ===
- 11 August - Elbit Systems announces US$1.63 billion defense deal with Serbia.

=== October ===
- 22 October - Rafael wins €2 billion contact to supply Germany with Spike missiles.

=== November ===
- 17 November - Elbit Systems announces US$2.3 billion deal, without specifying the identity of the customer, later revealed as the United Arab Emirates.

=== December ===
- 6 December - US758 million defense deal between Elbit Systems and Greece for the PULS, as part of the defense modernization plan.
- 14 December - ServiceNow proposes to buy Israeli cybersecurity company Armis for US$7 billion.
- 17 December -
  - US$34.7 billion natural gas export deal to Egypt via the Arish–Ashkelon pipeline.
  - Germany approves US$3.1 billion deal to buy more Arrow 3 systems from Israel Aerospace Industries.
  - Advent International closes US$2.5 billion purchase of Sapiens International Corporation.

== Holidays ==
- 13 April – Passover
- 19 April – Seventh day of Passover
- 1 May – Independence Day
- 2 June – Feast of Shavuot
- 23–24 September – Rosh Hashanah
- 2 October – Yom Kippur
- 7 October – Sukkot
- 14 October – Simchat Torah

== Deaths ==
- 2 January – Ágnes Keleti, (b. 1921), Hungarian-born artistic gymnast, Olympic champion (1952, 1956).
- 5 January – Clinton Bailey, (b. 1936), American-Israeli political scientist.
- 9 January – Shulamith Shahar, (b. 1928), Latvian-born historian.
- 10 January - Itzhak Brook, (b. 1941), Israeli-American physician
- 18 January – Ze'ev Revach, (b. 1940), Moroccan-born actor (Charlie Ve'hetzi, Hagiga B'Snuker, The Farewell Party) and comedian.
- 29 January – Gideon Spiro, (b. 1935), journalist and activist.
- 4 February - Assa Auerbach, (b. 1956), physicist
- 9 February – Amal Nasser el-Din, (b. 1926), Druze author and politician, MK (1977–1988).
- 11 February - Uri Eppstein, (b.1925) German-born musicologist
- 14 February – Avi Assouly, (b. 1950), French-Israeli journalist and politician, French deputy (2012–2014).
- 26 February – Renen Schorr, (b. 1952), film director, screenwriter and film producer.
- 3 March – Dore Gold, (b. 1953), American-Israeli political scientist and diplomat, permanent representative of Israel to the UN (1997–1999).
- 8 March – Nota Schiller, (b. 1937), American-born rabbi.
- 11 March - Moshe Gariani, (b. 1957), football player
- 14 March, Yehuda Ben-Meir, (b. 1939) politician, MK (1971-1984)
- 18 March – Aviva Semadar, (b. 1935), folklore and chanson singer.
- c. 21 March – Shmuel Agmon, (b. 1922), mathematician (Agmon's inequality).
- 22 March –
  - Alexander Mashkevitch, (b. 1954), Israeli-Kazakh businessman and investor.
  - Asaf Lifshitz, (b. 1942), sculptor.
- 25 March – Eric Minkin, (b. 1950), American-Israeli basketball player (Maccabi Tel Aviv, Hapoel Galil Elyon, national team).
- 26 March – Stef Wertheimer, (b. 1926), German-born industrialist and politician, MK (1977–1981).
- 3 April – Daniel Kluger, (b. 1951), writer.
- 5 April – Avigdor Yitzhaki, (b. 1949), politician, MK (2006–2008).
- 14 April – Aliza Magen-Halevi, (b. 1937), intelligence officer, deputy director of Mossad (1997–1999).
- 15 April – Reuma Weizman, (b. 1925), socialite, first lady (1993–2000).
- c. 19 April –
  - Meir Mazuz, (b. 1945), Tunisian-born rabbi.
  - Meir Nitzan, (b. 1931), Romanian-born politician, mayor of Rishon LeZion (1983–2008).
- c. 4 May – David Karako, (b. 1945), football player (Maccabi Tel Aviv, national team) and manager (Hapoel Yehud).
- 20 May – Gadi Kinda, (b. 1994), Ethiopian-born footballer (Ashdod, Sporting Kansas City, national team).
- 25 May – Yair Vardi, (b. 1948), dancer and choreographer.
- 31 May – Stanley Fischer, (b. 1943), Israeli-American economist, governor of the Bank of Israel (2005–2013) and Vice Chair of the Federal Reserve (2014–2017).
- 1 June – Aharon Amram, (b. 1939), Yemeni-born singer, composer, and poet.
- 3 June –
  - Gidon Graetz, (b. 1929), Swiss-Israeli sculptor.
  - Valery Panov, (b. 1938), Soviet-born ballet dancer and choreographer.
- 3 July – Zelig Eshhar, (b. 1941), immunologist and cancer researcher.
- 11 July – Moshe Zar, (b. 1937), religious Zionist and convicted terrorist.
- 14 July – Zvi Dror, (b. 1926), historian.
- 19 July – Giora Epstein, (b. 1938), Israeli Air Force officer and fighter ace.
- 20 July – Shmuel Goren, (b. 1928), military officer, commander of Unit 504 (1962–1968).
- 27 July – Judith Shuval, (b. 1925), sociologist.
- 29 July –
  - Alon Abutbul, (b. 1965), actor (Love at Second Sight, The Dark Knight Rises, London Has Fallen).
  - David Tartakover, (b. 1944), graphic designer and political activist.
- 4 August – Itamar Prat, (b. 1933), poet.
- 5 August – Ofer Yaakobi, (b. 1961), basketball player (Hapoel Holon, Hapoel Tel Aviv, national team).
- 8 August – Avraham Golik, (b. 1934), marine geologist and oceanographer.
- 10 August – Amnon Barzel, (b. 1935), art critic and author.
- 14 August – Gideon Kleinman, (b. 1955), footballer (Maccabi Netanya, Maccabi Hadera).
- 15 August – Miriam Benyamini, (b. 1940), astrologer.
- 28 August –
  - Rami Heuberger, (b. 1963), actor (Schindler's List, Dawn, Golda) and theatre director.
  - Dan Margalit, (b. 1938), journalist.
  - Thelma Admon, (b. 1950), writer.
- 29 August –
  - Ram Caspi, (b. 1939), attorney.
  - Menachem Hacohen, (b. 1932), rabbi and politician, MK (1974–1988).
- 31 August – Haim Nagid, (b. 1940), poet and writer.
- 9 September – Jacob Murey, (b. 1941), Soviet-born chess player.
- 16 September – Yehuda Zvi Blum, (b. 1931), Slovak-born legal scholar, permanent representative to the United Nations (1978–1984).
- 20 September –
  - David Kroyanker, (b. 1939), architect.
  - Aryeh Moskona, (b. 1947), Bulgarian-born actor (Kazablan, Charlie and a Half, Beyond the Sea) and singer.
- c. 22 September – Avraham Rinat, (b. 1929), Dutch-Israeli theoretical physicist.
- 3 October – Aryeh Azulai, (b. 1933), politician, mayor of Ashdod (1983–1989).
- 11 October – Albert Cohen, (b. 1932), actor (Blaumilch Canal, To Take a Wife, Zanzouri) and accordionist.
- 17 October – Tova Ben-Dov, (b. 1936/1937), Zionist activist, president of WIZO (2012–2016).
- 18 October – Dita Kraus, (b. 1929), Czech-Israeli teacher and Holocaust librarian.
- 21 October – Michael Smuss, (b. 1926), Polish-born painter and Holocaust survivor, last survivor of the Warsaw Ghetto Uprising.
- 25 October – Ofer Nachshon, (b. 1966), broadcaster and radio announcer.
- 27 October – Shraga Bar, (b. 1948), footballer (Maccabi Netanya, Hapoel Ramat Gan, national team).
- 31 October – Adam Greenberg, (b. 1937), Israeli-American cinematographer (The Terminator, Ghost, Rush Hour).
- 4 November – Ada Feinberg-Sireni, (b. 1930), Italian-born politician, MK (1969–1974).
- 6 November – Sasha Okun, (b. 1949), Soviet-born artist, author and educator.
- 10 November – Herzl Bodinger, (b. 1943), military officer, commander of the Air Force (1992–1996).
- 17 November – Avishai Dekel, (b. 1951), cosmologist.
- 21 November –
  - Miriam Feirberg, (b. 1951), politician, mayor of Netanya (since 1998).
  - Eli Zeira, (b. 1928), military intelligence officer, director of the Military Intelligence Directorate (1973).
- 23 November – Michail Grobman, (b. 1939), Russian-born poet and painter.
- 28 November –
  - Dan Tolkowsky, (b. 1921), military officer and businessman, commander of the Air Force (1953–1958).
  - Moshe Yegar, (b. 1930), Argentine-born diplomat and historian.
- 30 November – Ram Loevy, (b. 1940), film director (Bread, Close, Closed, Closure, The Dead of Jaffa) and screenwriter.
- 24 December – Mohammad Bakri, (b. 1953), Palestinian-Israeli film director (Jenin, Jenin) and actor (Haifa, The Lark Farm).
- 25 December – Amos Poe, (b. 1949), Israeli-American film director, producer and screenwriter (The Foreigner, Subway Riders, La commedia di Amos Poe).
- 26 December – Issam Makhoul, (b. 1952), politician, MK (1999–2006).
- 28 December – Hedva Harechavi, (b. 1941), poet.
