= Beersheba Theater =

Israeli theater

Coordinates: 31°15′6.26″N 34°47′50.64″E

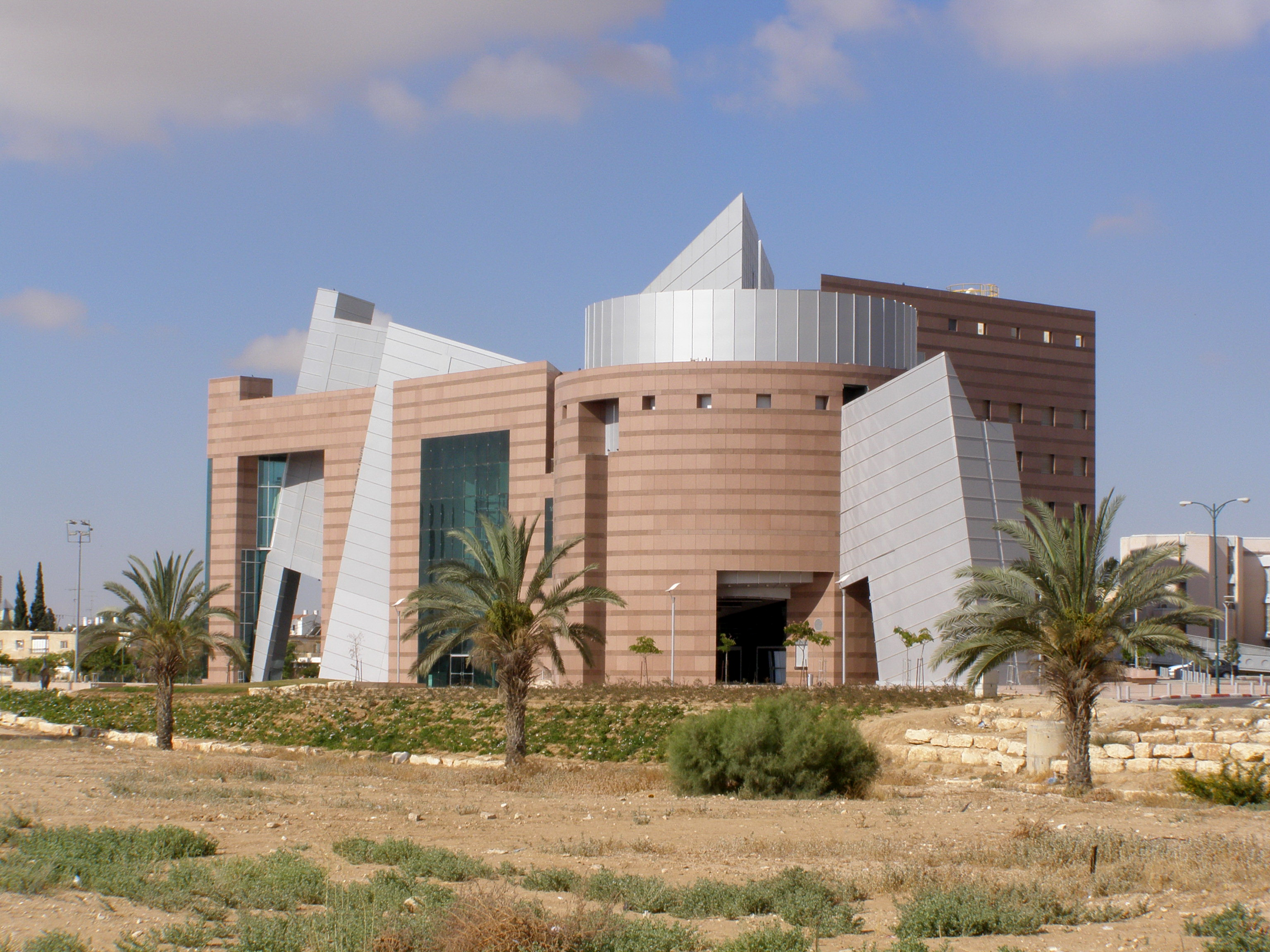
Beersheba Performing Arts Center, where the Beersheba Theater and Beersheba Symphony Orchestra perform.

The Beersheba Theater (Hebrew: תיאטרון באר שבע) is a theater located in Beersheba, Israel.

== History ==
The Beersheba Theater was established by actresses Naomi Blumenthal and Margalit Stander during Eliyahu Nawi's tenure as mayor of Beersheba. The actresses created the theater with the help of Bentz Carmel, who then served as Beersheva's deputy mayor and the councilmember responsible for cultural affairs. In 1973, after the theater had produced two plays, Geri Bilu was appointed as the organization's director. Bilu served as the theater's artistic and administrative director for eight years, working to transform it into a professional repertoire theater.

The theater faced numerous difficulties in its early years, struggling to attract actors and patrons. Its first performers included Naomi Blumenthal, Eti Shiloni, Debla Reizer, Sasi Saad, Shulik Shilo, Yosi Kantz, Hogo Yarden, Michael Ronen, Rafi Tavor, Margalit Stander, Irit Shilo, Ilana Yinovski, Ora Bar-Or and Robert Hanig, who were later joined by Doron Tavori. The theater's first director was Dr. Dan Ronen. The theater continued to encounter difficulties after its launch, facing budgetary constraints and lacking an appropriate space for performances. Actors and directors rarely made appearances at the theater due to its physical remoteness from the center of the country.

Despite these challenges, the theater gradually formed a group of performers, including notable actors Sharon Alexander, Hana Azulay Hasafri, Hagit Desberg, and Yoram Hatav. The theater also attracted accomplished directors such as Edna Shavit, Tom Levi, Dan Ronen, and Theodore Toma.
Over the years, a number of the theater's plays were conducted at Beit HaAm, which currently houses the Goodman Acting School. As the theater's repertoire grew, some of its plays were performed at the Culture Center of Beersheba. In 2008, the theater moved to the Performing Arts Center of Beersheba, where the Beersheba Symphony Orchestra performs, and where many conventions and events are held.

Rafi Niv currently serves as the artistic director.

== Activity ==
Each season, the Beersheba Theater features five to seven original and classical plays. The theater produces repertoire plays, performances of other theaters as well as independent actors, and children's plays. Many of the plays are featured at other theaters across the country. Roughly 30 actors and 70 other workers are employed by the theater. The theater also conducts classes, workshops and educational programs for special-needs communities. The purpose of these activities is to strengthen groups and individuals through theatrical involvement.

== CEOs of the theater ==
- Zipi Pines – 1981–1993
- Gadi Rol – 1993–1996
- Razi Amitay – 1996–2004
- Natan Datner – 2004–2009
- Shmulik Yifrah – 2009 - current

== Repertoire ==
- Harold and Maude directed by Rafi Niv
- A Winter Funeral directed by Udi Ben-Moshe
- Blood Wedding directed by Kfir Azulay
- Selichot directed by Hana Azoulay-Hasfari
- Chapter 2 directed by Rafi Niv

== See also ==
- HaNephesh Theater
- The Arab-Hebrew Theater
