= Albert Cohen (actor) =

Israeli actor (1932–2025)

- אלברט כהן
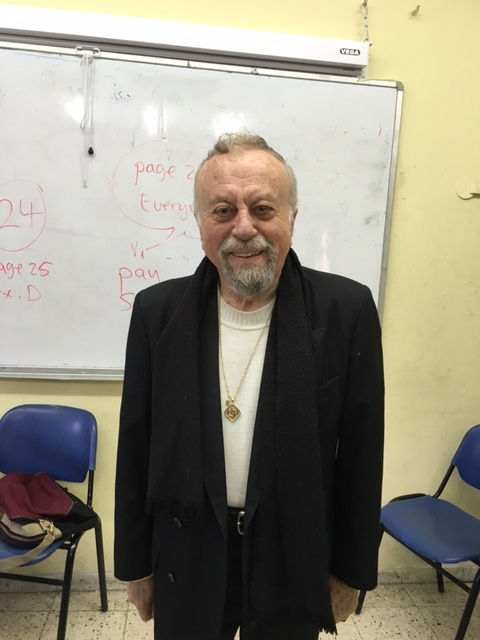
- Cohen in 2016
- Born: 9 June 1932; Sofia, Bulgaria
- Died: 11 October 2025 (aged 93); Ramat Gan, Israel
- Occupations: Actor; voice actor; theatre director; singer; accordionist
- Years active: 1952–2025
- Spouses: Ruth Mense (m. 1959; died 1988) Da'at Levontin (m. 1991)
- Children: Ady; Sharon
- Relatives: Lenny Cohen (granddaughter)

Albert Cohen (Hebrew: אלברט כהן; 9 June 1932 – 11 October 2025) was an Israeli actor, voice actor, theatre director, singer and accordionist.

== Background ==
Albert Cohen was born in Sofia, Bulgaria on 9 June 1932, to a Bulgarian Jewish family. He attended the National Academy of Music and later played at Sofia's National Theatre.

In 1949, Cohen and his family immigrated to Israel. Cohen married twice. His first wife, Ruth Mense, a pianist for the Israel Philharmonic Orchestra, died from multiple sclerosis in 1988. They had two sons: Ady, a composer, and Sharon, a voice actor and translator. His granddaughter Lenny Cohen is also an actress. Cohen's second wife, Da'at Levontin, who he married in the early 1990s, is also a pianist.

Cohen resided in Ramat Gan from 1960. He died on 11 October 2025, at the age of 93.

== Acting and singing career ==
Cohen was a member of the Southern Command Band. He acted, sang and accompanied himself on the accordion. He left the troupe in 1952 and joined a satirical theatre group. In 1964, Cohen made his debut film appearance in Sallah Shabati starring Chaim Topol. His other film appearances include the 1969 film Blaumilch Canal directed by Ephraim Kishon and the 2005 film To Take a Wife directed by Ronit and Shlomi Elkabetz. Cohen has also made appearances on television. In 1987, he appeared as a guest star on Parpar Nechmad. He is also renowned for appearing in the comic series Zanzouri. He made further guest appearances on Polishuk and Bnot HaZahav.

After 1966, Cohen performed with the Cameri Theatre, acting in adaptations of The Comedy of Errors, Joseph and the Amazing Technicolor Dreamcoat, Pied Piper of Hamelin, The Government Inspector, Les Misérables. Cohen also made appearances at the HaNephesh Theatre and he directed several plays by Anton Chekhov.

Cohen also worked as a voice dubber. He served as the voice of numerous characters in the Hebrew version of Sesame Street. Other roles include Mr. Smee in Peter Pan, Merlin in The Sword in the Stone, King Harold in the Shrek franchise, Toby in Thomas and the Magic Railroad, Dumbledore in the Harry Potter franchise, Anger in Inside Out, Vitruvius in The Lego Movie, Professor Derek Knight in Monsters University, Bulldog in Planes and many more. He also voiced Slinky Dog in Toy Story 4 following the death of Slinky's previous voice actor, Yehuda Efroni. Cohen collaborated frequently with his son, Sharon Cohen on dubbing projects.
