= Thelma Admon =

Israeli writer (1950–2025)

Thelma Admon (Hebrew: תלמה אדמון; February 25, 1950 – August 28, 2025) was an Israeli writer.

== Life and work ==
Admon was born Thelma Guralnik in Palmahim on February 25, 1950. Her father, Israel Guralnik, was one of the founders of the kibbutz. At the age of seven, she left the kibbutz with her parents. She did her military service as a reporter at the "Nahal Camp". After her discharge from the army, she worked as a writer and editor for the newspapers "Et" and "Maariv". Between the years 1995-2005, she edited the "Literature and Books" section of the Maariv newspaper.

In 2002 she was awarded the Prime Minister's Prize for Hebrew Writers.

Admon died on August 28, 2025, at the age of 75.
