= Shmuel Goren =

Israeli military officer (1928–2025)

Shmuel Goren (Hebrew: שמואל גורן; 1928 – 20 July 2025) was an Israeli military officer. He served as commander of Unit 504 from 1962 to 1968.

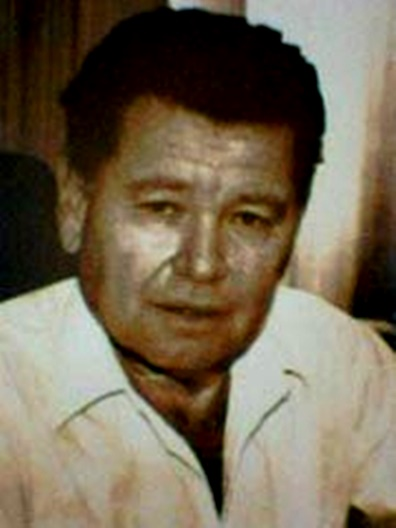
Shmuel Goren

== Biography ==
Goren was born 1928 in Ein Harod. He participated in the 1948 Palestine war, the Suez Crisis, the Six-Day War, the War of Attrition, and the Yom Kippur War. Goren died on 20 July 2025, at the age of 97.
