= Haim Nagid =

Israeli poet (1940–2025)

- חיים נגיד
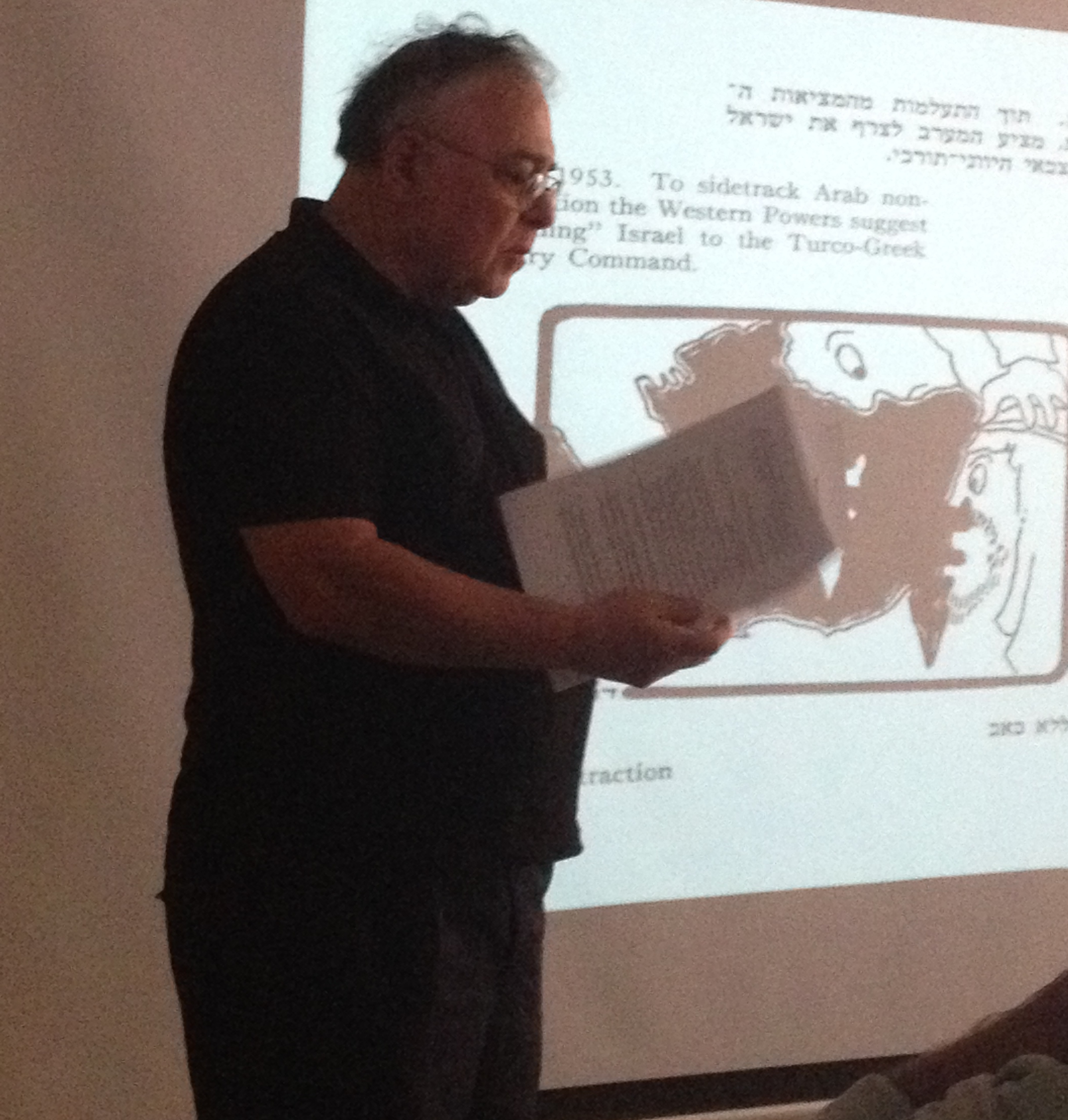
- Nagid in 2014
- Born: September 8, 1940; Bucharest, Romania
- Died: August 31, 2025 (aged 84)
- Occupation(s): Poet, writer

Haim Nagid (Hebrew: חיים נגיד; September 8, 1940 – August 31, 2025) was an Israeli poet and writer.

== Life and career ==
Nagid was born in Bucharest, Romania as Carol Silviu Löwenberg and immigrated to Israel in 1948. After his discharge from the IDF, he worked as a bookkeeper, and at the same time studied philosophy, literature, and education at Tel Aviv University, where he received his Ph.D. In his third year of studies, he began teaching literature and philosophy in high schools.

After seven years of teaching, he began to work as an editor, editing the newspaper "Bein Galim" of the Education Corps. Between 1968 and 1972 he published reviews of books in "Masha", the literary supplement of "Lamerhav", and in 1968-1987 he wrote reviews of books in "Mazanim" and articles on culture in the monthly "Monthly Review" of the Education Corps. From 1976 to 1992 he was editor of the literary section of "Maariv".

He is the author of hundreds of literary and theatrical criticism articles that were published in the newspapers "Yedioth Ahronoth", "Maariv", "Mazanim", and many others, and which were broadcast on the radio stations Kol Israel and Galei Tzahal. Since 1996 he lectured on theater, literature, education and communication at various academic institutions, including Tel Aviv University, Oranim College, Beit Berl and Kibbutzim College.

He was one of the founders of the General Union of Writers in Israel (1996), where he founded the journal "Gag" (1998).

Nagid died on August 31, 2025, at the age of 84.
