= Miriam Benyamini =

Israeli astrologer (1940–2025)

- מרים בנימיני
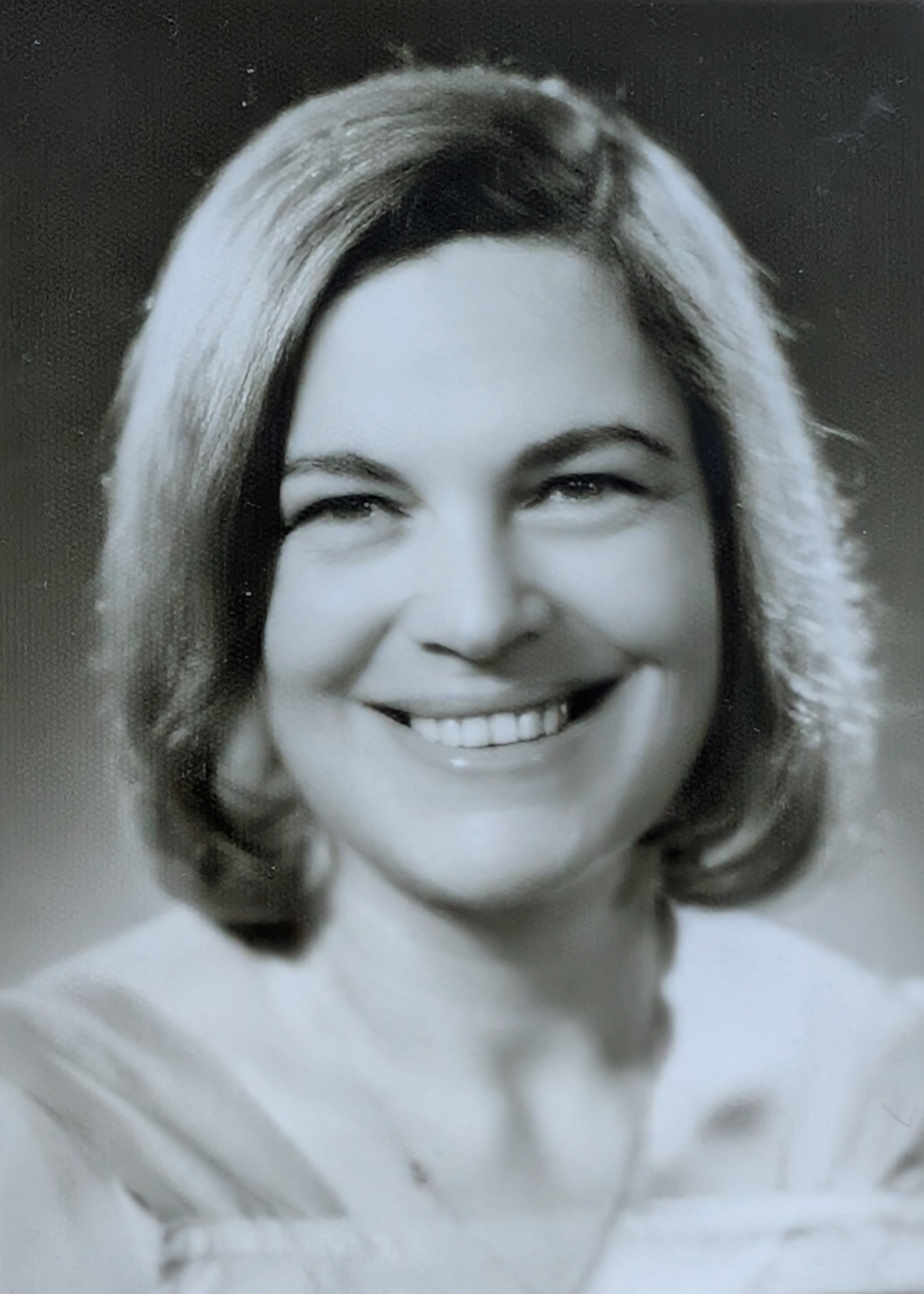
- Born: 1940; Kvutzat Yavne, Mandatory Palestine
- Died: 15 August 2025 (aged 85); Jerusalem, Israel

Miriam Benyamini (Hebrew: מרים בנימיני; 1940 – 15 August 2025) was an Israeli astrologer.

Benyamini had a column in Yedioth Ahronoth.

== Early life ==
Miriam Benyamini was born to Ruth and Menachem Bar-Droma, a German-Dutch couple who immigrated to Kvutzat Yavne during World War II.

== Astrology ==
Benyamini had a popular column in the newspaper Yedioth Ahronoth.

== Death ==
Benyamini died on 15 August 2025, at the age of 85. A funeral was held the following day at Har HaMenuchot in Jerusalem.
