= Itamar Prat =

Israeli poet and author (1933–2025)

Itamar Prat (Hebrew: איתמר פרת; 1933 – August 4, 2025) was an Israeli poet and author.

== Life and career ==
Prat was born in Amsterdam in 1933. He emigrated to Palestine in 1939 following the outbreak of World War II. Throughout his career, Prat wrote extensively and published a number of poetry collections.

Prat died on August 4, 2025, at the age of 92.
