= Avraham Golik =

Israeli marine geologist (1934–2025)

- אברהם גוליק
- Born: 12 April 1934; Tel Aviv, Mandatory Palestine
- Died: 8 August 2025 (aged 91)
- Scientific career
- Fields: Marine geology; Oceanography

Avraham Golik (Hebrew: אברהם גוליק; 12 April 1934 – 8 August 2025) was an Israeli marine geologist and oceanographer.

== Life and career ==
Golik was born on 12 April 1934 in Tel Aviv. During his mandatory service in the IDF, he underwent an officers' course and served as commander of an anti-aircraft battery, in the Yom Kippur War. In 1960 he completed a master's degree in geology at the Hebrew University of Jerusalem, and in the same year began working as a research assistant at the Scripps Institute of Oceanography, where he completed his doctorate in oceanography in 1965.

In 1967 he returned to Israel, settled in Haifa, and joined the founding team of Oceanography and Lakes Research for Israel as Chief Scientist. In the 1970s, he studied, among other things, the tar pollution in the Mediterranean. In the 1980s, he led a team that studied the migration of sands in the Nile Delta together with Egyptian scientists. He later served as director of the Laboratory of Marine Geology, before retiring in 2002.

On 8 August 2025, Golik died at the age of 91.
