= Avraham Rinat =

Dutch-Israeli theoretical physicist (1929–2025)

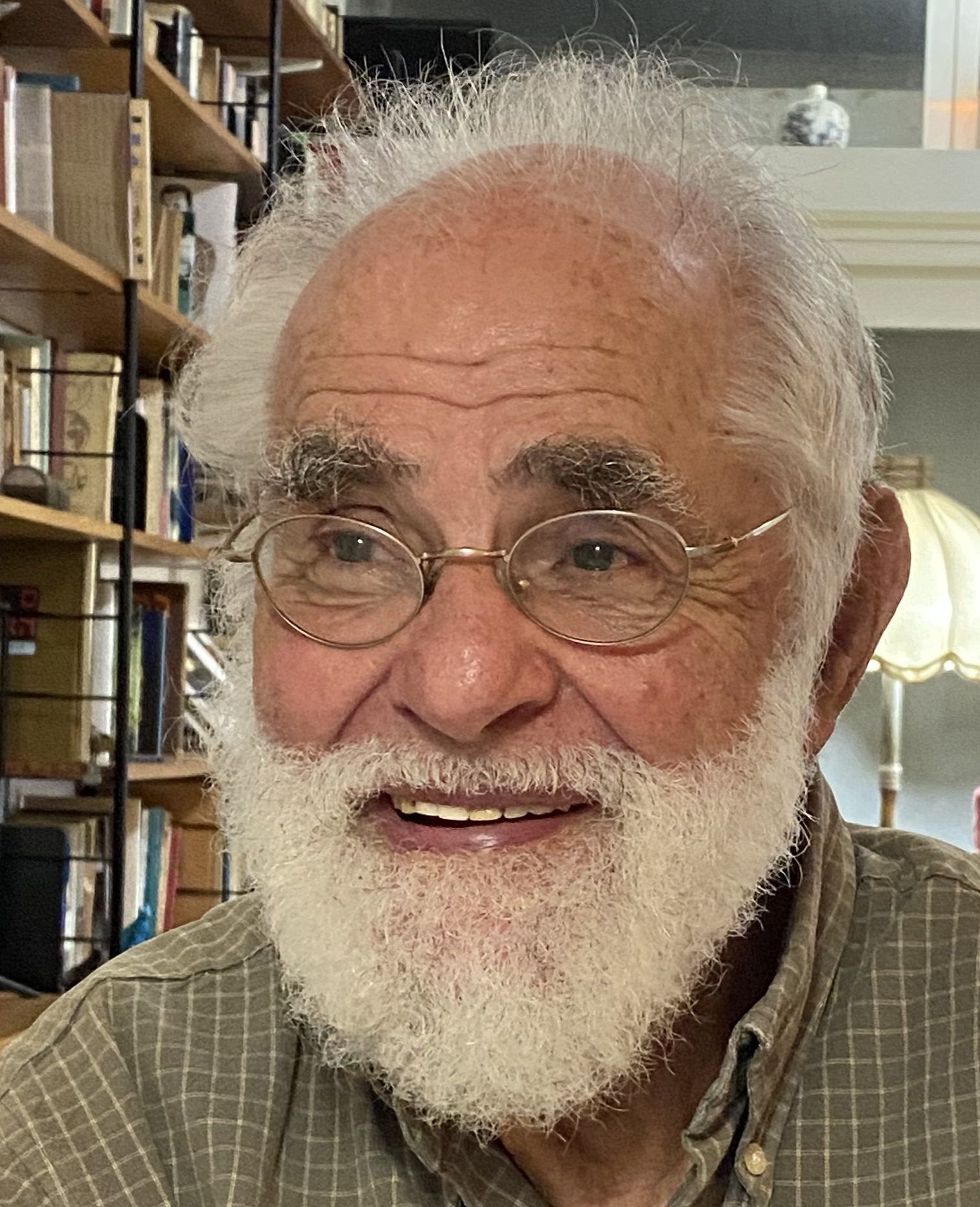
Rinat in 2023

Avraham S. Rinat-Reiner (Hebrew: אברהם רינת; 3 June 1929 – September 2025) was a Dutch-Israeli theoretical physicist who worked as professor at the Weizmann Institute of Science.

== Life and career ==
Rinat was born in Amsterdam on 3 June 1929. During his childhood he was friends with Anne Frank. During World War II Rinat went into hiding on a farm in Hollandscheveld. He ended up in Westerbork transit camp where he remained until the liberation of the camp. In 1958 he obtained his PhD at the University of Amsterdam under professor J. de Boer with a thesis titled: "Structure effects in the interaction between nuclei and atomic electrons".

He was elected a corresponding member of the Royal Netherlands Academy of Arts and Sciences in 1981.

Rinat died in September 2025, at the age of 96.
