= Tova Ben-Dov =

Israeli activist (1936 or 1937 – 2025)

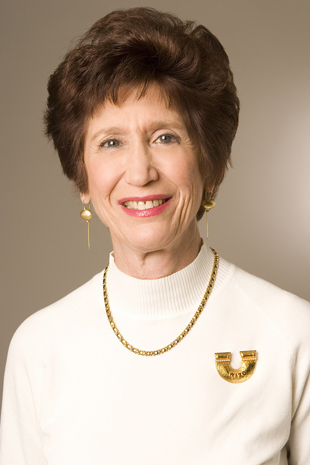
Ben-Dov 2010

Tova Ben-Dov (1936 or 1937 – 17 October 2025) was an Israeli activist who was Honorary Life President of the Women's International Zionist Organization (WIZO), the largest women's Zionist organisation in the world. She also served as President of World WIZO Executive from 2012 to 2016. In her capacity of this role, she was also the Vice President of the World Jewish Congress, a board member of the Jewish Agency for Israel, and a board member of the International Alliance of Women.

Ben-Dov died on 17 October 2025, at the age of 88.
