= Uri Eppstein =

Japan culture and music researcher (1925–2025)

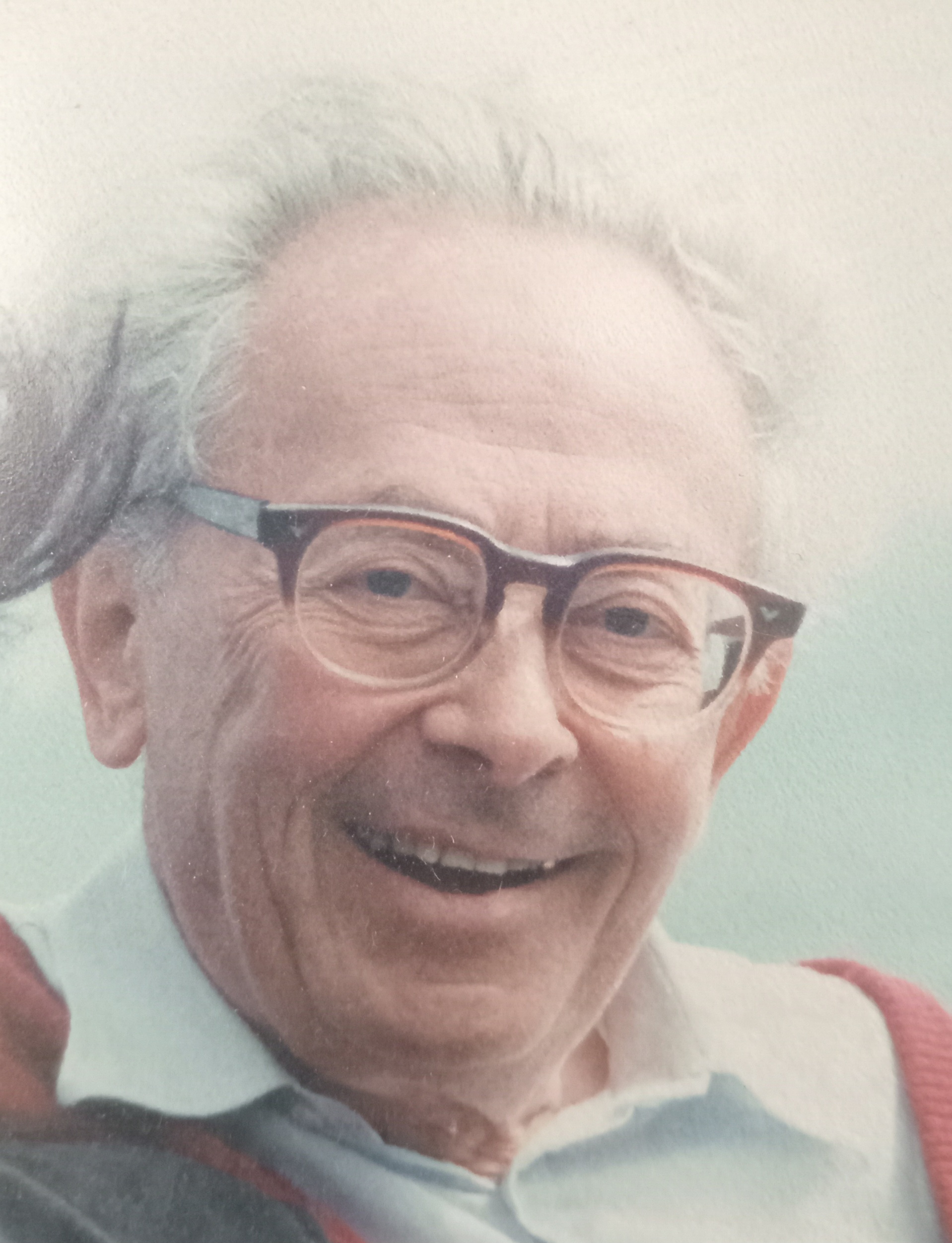
Musicologist and researcher of Japanese culture Prof. Uri Eppstein

Uri Eppstein (Hebrew: אורי אפשטיין; February 3, 1925, Saarbrücken, Germany – February 11, 2025, Jerusalem) was a musicologist, music critic and professor of Japanese music and culture, a member of the Order of the Rising Sun.

== Biography ==
Ferdinand (Uri) Eppstein was born to Irwin Eppstein and Hertha Kahn in Saarbrücken. He immigrated to Eretz Israel in 1935 and lived with his parents in Haifa and then in Tel Aviv. He played the piano from his youth. He graduated from high school in 1943 and served as a Noter in the Jewish Settlement Police. In 1945 he began his studies at the Hebrew University of Jerusalem.

In the War of Independence, Eppstein was drafted into Haganah and specialized in a Military two-way radio position. (Note: Signallers in the War of Independence, by Jacob Ba' al shem) He fought on the Jerusalem front and participated in an attempt to break into the Old City in May 1948. (Note: Site of Etzioni Brigade in the War of Independence) His younger brother Nathan-Herbert Samuel Eppstein died in the War of Independence. (Note: on Eppstein, Saarbruecken Archive])In 1965 he married Kikue Iguchi (deceased in 2019), whom he met while studying in Japan, and they had two sons, Yitzhak and Benjamin Nathan.

== Media and music career ==
In 1949, Eppstein worked as a radio program editor and as a publications editor at the Jewish Agency. As a pianist he began studying at the Jerusalem Academy of Music and Dance. He received a scholarship for Japanese cultural studies from the Japanese government, arrived in Japan in 1958 and studied Japanese music at the Tokyo University of the Arts. He lectured in a class for teaching Hebrew founded by the brother of the emperor of Japan, Takahito, Prince Mikasa, who attended the classes as a student. (Note: the Little Prince, 31 December 2015)

In 1963, Eppstein returned to Israel and worked at the Hebrew University editing publications and in the music department. In 1972 he began lecturing at Tel Aviv University (where he lectured until 1977) and at the Hebrew University of Jerusalem. He completed his doctorate at Tel Aviv University in 1984 on the topic "The beginning of Western music in Japan during the Meiji era." His PhD was published by Tel Aviv University Press. (Note: Eppstein U. (1983). The beginnings of western music in Meiji Era Japan: Thesis Ph. D. / Ury Eppstein. Tel Aviv: Tel Aviv University.)

Eppstein was a visiting lecturer at the University of Copenhagen (1981), Lund University in Sweden (1986) and the University of Tokyo (1998).

Eppstein was the Jerusalem Post's music critic from the 1980s until 2022.

== Public activity ==
- Chairman of the Israel-Japan Friendship Society, Jerusalem, 2001.
- Member of the Israeli Association for Musicology.
- Member of the Asian Music Society.
- Member of the European Association for Japanese Studies.

== Decorations and honors ==
- Israeli Interfaith Committee Award, 1980.
- Member of the Order of the Rising Sun, a title awarded to him by the emperor of Japan, 1989. (Note: Stadtarchiv Saarbrücken)
- Award winner of the Israeli Interfaith Committee, 1980.

== Published works ==
- Eppstein, Ury (1994). The Beginnings of Western Music in Meiji Era Japan: Studies in the History and Interpretation of Music, Vol 44. Edwin Mellen Press. pp. 19–24. ISBN 9780773491519.

His research dealt with the introduction of Western music into Japan's education system. The study revealed the existence of conflicting tendencies in the early and late Meiji era. The reception of other Western cultural values in Japan, such as philosophy, the arts, the natural sciences and others, has been extensively studied, and Eppstein's research contributed to a topic that had not been studied until then. (Note: The Edwin Mellen Press Publisher of scholarly books.)

- The entry on Japanese music, the general Israeli encyclopedia, Jerusalem, Keter, 1987. (Note: Japanese Bibliography in Hebrew)
- "Response singing in Japanese religious rituals", Tzlil 13, Haifa, Music Museum and Library Publishing, 1973, pp. 129–132.
- "Nationalism for Beginners: Japanese School Songs and the War", in Rotem Kowner (ed.), The Forgotten Campaign: The Russo-Japanese War and Its Legacy, Tel Aviv, Ma'arachot publishing house, 2005. P. 459-475.
- "Musical Education in Japan", in Musical Education 9, Jerusalem, Ministry of Education and Culture, Pedagogical Secretariat, 1966, pp. 26–30.
- From torture to fascination: changing Western attitudes to Japanese music, Japan Forum, Volume 19, 2007 – Issue 2. (Note: Japan Forum, Volume 19, 2007 – Issue 2)
- Eppstein, Ury (2020). "Militarism in Japanese School Songs". Il Giappone. Studi e Ricerche (in Italian). 1: 01–15. doi:10.6092/2724-4369 (inactive 1 July 2025). ISSN 2724-4369.
- Eppstein, Ury (2001). "Gilboa, Jacob". In Stanley Sadie; John Tyrrell (professor of music) (eds.). The New Grove Dictionary of Music and Musicians (2nd ed.). London: Macmillan.
- Summary of the Kyoto Conference on Japanese Studies, 1996 (co-author).

=== Journalistic writing and editing ===
- Classical music review columns in the Jerusalem Post from 1995 to 2022.
- Editor of a daily newspaper in the Hebrew language called "Zmanim (Times)" published by the Central European Emigrants Organization, a newspaper published regularly until 1955 and after a period in which it appeared irregularly – closed.
- Music editor at Network A of the Israeli radio in the sixties.

=== Translations ===
- The kabuki play "Kanjincho" – translation from Japanese to Hebrew. The play was published in the magazine Bama (stage) in 1993.
