= Zanzouri (TV series) =

- Genre: Comedy drama
- Created by: Yuval Friedman; Ben Bacher; Yuval Semo; Dafna Parner
- Written by: Yuval Friedman
- Starring: Yuval Semo; Irit Kaplan; Danny Geva; Albert Cohen; Oren Zagman; Danny Berman; Shina Ray; Avi Dangor; Regev Zarka
- Opening theme: Sunday Arak by Balkan Beat Box
- Composer: Danny Reichenthal
- Country of origin: Israel
- Original language: Hebrew
- No. of seasons: 1
- No. of episodes: 14

Production
- Executive producers: Yfat Sela; Oriana Givoli-Gnniger; Shay Innes; Shira Kadar-Levi
- Producer: Yfat Sela
- Cinematography: Asher Ben Yair
- Editors: Roey Nachum; Nir Nachum
- Running time: 30 minutes

Original release
- Network: yes
- Release: 11 June – 25 July 2012

Zanzouri is an Israeli television series from cable network yes, set in Yavne. It stars Yuval Semo as Pini Zanzouri.

== Plot ==
Pinhas "Pini" Zanzouri lives in Yavne, a town in central Israel, with his wife and two children. Zanzouri is an average Israeli citizen with an average job, who comes home and passes his evenings watching TV.

On his 40th birthday, Zanzouri's life changes forever when his father comes to him with two revelations: that all the men in his family have died in their 40th year, and that he is adopted. Accepting that he has a year to live, Zanzouri decides to fulfill all his dreams and fantasies.

== Main cast ==
- Yuval Semo as Pini Zanzouri – a driving teacher by profession, Zanzouri is conservative, petty, rude, childish, inflexible, obsessive and miserly, but also soft and tender inside. He constantly expresses regret for his choices in life, including his wedding at age 17.
- Irit Kaplan as Hanny Zanzouri - a kindergarten assistant. Very competitive, she has an obsession with cleanliness. She is loud and very physical, traits which are embarrassing to Pini.
