= Michael Smuss =

Polish artist and Holocaust survivor (1926–2025)

- מייקל סמוס
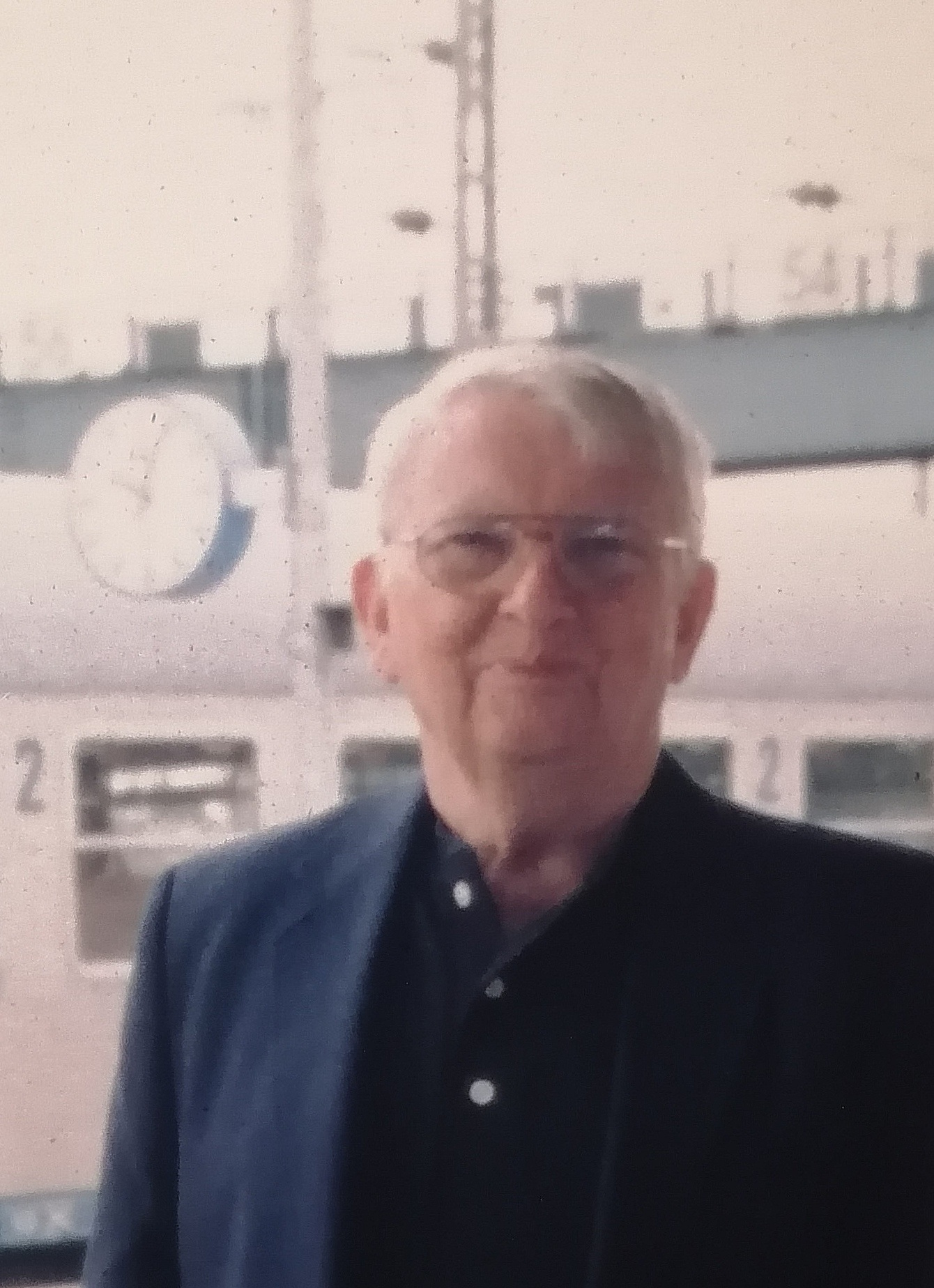
- Smuss (before 2000)
- Born: 15 April 1926; Free City of Danzig
- Died: 21 October 2025 (aged 99); Ramat Gan, Israel
- Known for: Participation in the Warsaw Ghetto Uprising; art
- Awards: German Federal Cross of Merit

Michael Smuss (15 April 1926 – 21 October 2025) was a survivor of the Holocaust and an artist. Smuss was the last surviving resistance fighter of the Warsaw Ghetto Uprising.

== Early life ==
Smuss was born in Danzig, Free City of Danzig on 15 April 1926, to David and Margarete Smuss. When Michael was 6 years old, Nazi Germany took over the city. The Nazis then outlawed Jewish children in the public school system, after which Smuss was removed from his school for being an “enemy of the people.” Smuss's father homeschooled him until they moved to Lodz when Smuss was 12.

In 1939, after the Nazis took over Poland, the Nazis started taking Jews to bring to the Warsaw Ghetto. Due to a misunderstanding of Margarete's passport, Polish authorities assumed she was a German citizen, which allowed her and Smuss's sister, Frida, to find work. Smuss and his father were deported to the Warsaw Ghetto.

== Holocaust ==
=== Warsaw Ghetto ===
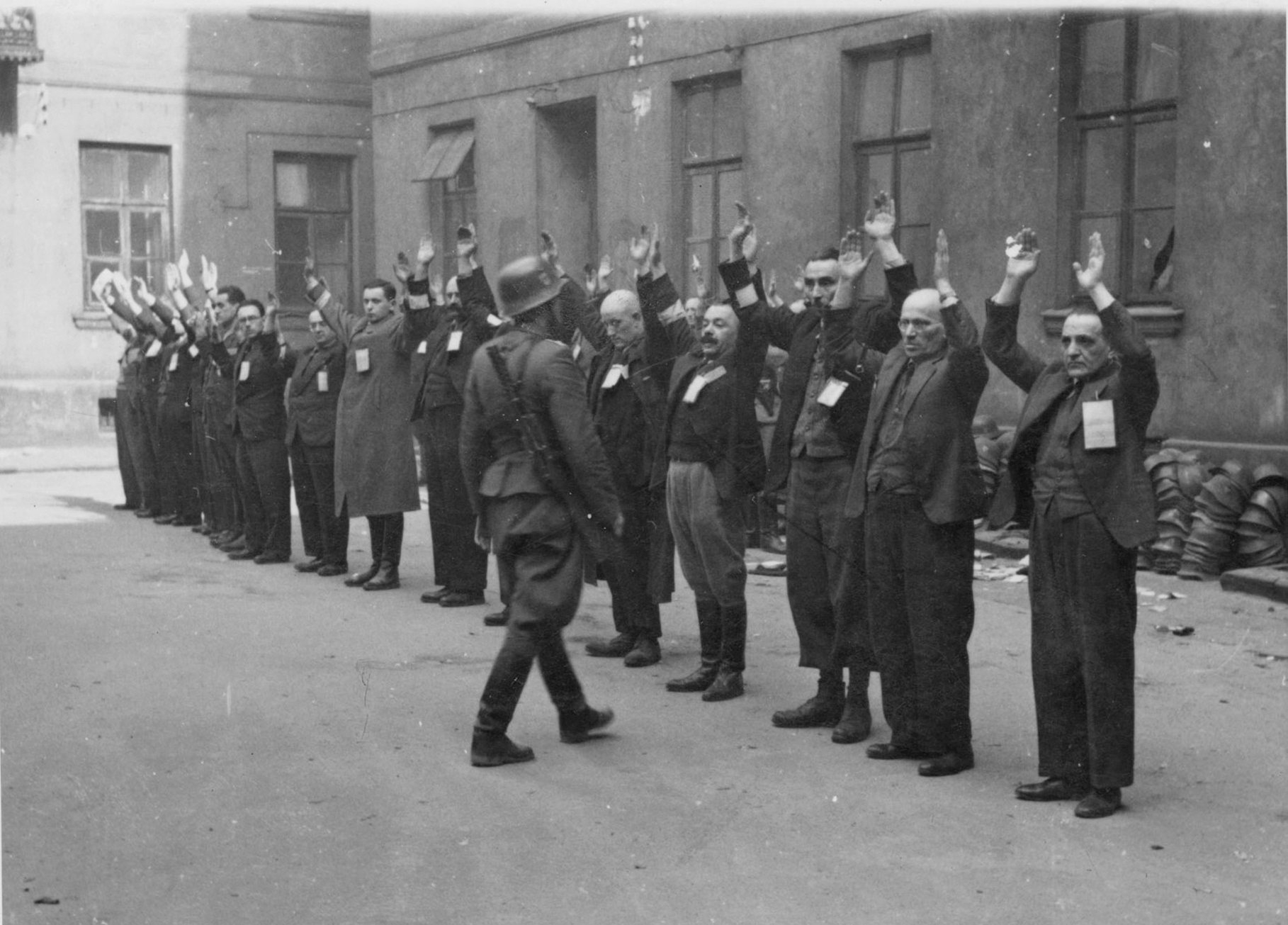
The arrest of the forced laborers of the Brauer armaments company.

Smuss's father had connections that allowed him to open a shop in the ghetto. In the three years he spent at the ghetto, Smuss associated himself with Jewish underground movements. He was a member of the Hashomer Hatzair Zionist movement and in the ghetto joined the ŻOB resistance group. Smuss had been working at the Hermann Brauer factory on Nalewki Street repairing military helmets, and stealing paint thinner so the resistance movement could make Molotov cocktails. Smuss also collected guns dropped by the British into a nearby woods for use by the resistance.

On 19 April 1943, the order was given to liquidate the remaining Jews in the Warsaw Ghetto. German forces and their collaborators entered the ghetto but were ambushed by the resistance and retreated. Smuss threw molotov cocktails from rooftops at the Nazi forces during this engagement. However, the Nazi forces, under the command of Jürgen Stroop, returned. In around a month of fighting they managed to smoke the approximately 700 resistance fighters out. Smuss and his father were part of a group of resistance fighters not killed, who were meant to be shown off to foreign media at the Treblinka death camp. During the train ride, Smuss had translated an argument between German officers regarding the train stealing the airport's workers to make the trip to the death camp more cost efficient. After a back and forth, the train returned the workers.

=== Concentration camps and death march ===
German labour contractors went onto the train to request machinery workers, which Smuss volunteered his friends, father, and himself for. They were all transferred to the Budzyń concentration camp. One night the head of the camp, Reinhold Feix, shot Smuss's father after he tried to escape. Smuss was then told that he was at risk due to Feix liking to shoot the family members of the people he killed. Smuss was told to request a meeting with Feix, ask for his dead father's coat, and seem generally disinterested in his father's death. Feix granted Smuss's request, but threatened to kill him if he ever saw Smuss not wearing the coat. The coat was used to smuggle food.

In July 1944, Smuss and his friends were sent to the Messerschmitt aircraft factory. They made a brief stop at the Auschwitz concentration camp in August, before arriving at the Flossenbürg concentration camp. He was given the number 16109 before being sent off to work. Smuss purposely missaid his name when the Germans were putting his name in what he heard was an IBM Computer, so the Germans thought his name was "Sohece Smuss". Smuss was in Flossenbürg until April 1945.

An ambulance was sent by members of the Swedish Red Cross, who gave all the Jews a loaf of bread. They were then told they were being exchanged for German soldiers captured by the Americans, which was a lie meant to trick them. Some of the Jews were then put on a train sent to the Dachau concentration camp but was bombed by the Americans, who mistook the train for one carrying German soldiers, Jewish inmates, including Smuss then carried the bodies back to the crematorium. After the bombing, a death march to Dachau began. As American forces came closer, the Germans fled. This allowed Smuss and his friend to escape to a barn house in Stamsried. After this a farmer came out with a gun and told them to get out, but he eventually gave them milk and called an American ambulance. Smuss was then taken to the Idar-Oberstein hospital.

== Post-Holocaust ==
After leaving the hospital, Smuss found his mother and sister in Lodz. Fearing retaliation from Polish people who were unwelcoming to Jews, Smuss and his family moved to a displaced persons camp in the American occupation zone in Germany. In the camp, Smuss became involved in Zionist activities with the Hashomer Hatzair movement, but became disillusioned following the Battles of Latrun of the 1948 Arab-Israeli War, after people whom he had convinced to emigrate to Israel were killed in the fighting. In 1950 he decided to emigrate to the United States. He moved to New York City on a Liberty ship along with his mother and sister. He married and had a daughter and son.

In 1956, Smuss obtained a high school diploma and got a degree in bookkeeping and taxation law from the City College of New York and subsequently worked in the field. He was brought to a clinic for survivors because of his PTSD; the drugs they gave Smuss only made him worse. Feeling that he was losing control of his life and that he would be a burden to his family, he separated from his wife and children. He continued to work and take medications but found that the PTSD persisted, and was told that he should consider moving to Israel, where there were many Holocaust survivors like him. Smuss emigrated to Israel in 1979 and settled in Tel Aviv. He received Social Security payments from the US, meaning that he did not need a full-time job, and found a part-time job at a hotel. He met other Holocaust survivors and began painting about his Holocaust experiences. Having had no previous experience in painting, he taught himself through trial and error. One of Smuss' neighbors played the cello and he would paint while listening to the music. He recalled that "the music and the painting helped me regain control of my life." As of today, the Florida Holocaust Museum has 38 of his paintings in his “Reflections of a Survivor” collection, which The Times of Israel called "highly-regarded".

Smuss met his wife, Ruthy, at a spa in Arad. After overcoming his PTSD, he decided to tell his story. He joined the March of the Living as a witness and lectured about his experiences in Israel and abroad. A musical film named To Paint the Earth was made about him. Smuss was the last living fighter of the Warsaw Ghetto Uprising.

In September 2025, Smuss was awarded the German Federal Cross of Merit. Smuss died on 21 October 2025, at the age of 99. Both the Polish and German Embassies wrote responses to his death.
