= HaNephesh Theater =

HaNephesh Theater is a Jewish fringe theater established in 1978 by Howard Rypp and Gabriel Emanuel in Canada. At the time of its founding, HaNefesh was the only professional Jewish theater in Canada, where it produced approximately 40 theatrical and television productions. In 1980 the theater produced its first play, Children of the Night. The play, which tells the story of Janusz Korczak, was featured in the first International Jewish Theater Festival in New York City.

In 1983, Rypp immigrated to Israel, bringing the theater with him. The theater's first production in Israel was Emanuel's joint production with Habima Theater called Einstein. It was translated into several languages, and in 2005 was performed in New York on Broadway.

From 1988 to 1994 Yitzchak Meshel served as the theater's dramaturge and conducted 7 of its plays. Since 1995 Beatriz Hal serves as the theater's dramaturge.

The theater is recognized and supported by Israel's Ministry of Culture. The theater conducts educational plays that focus on various social conflicts in Israeli society, for example between the religious and secular communities, new and veteran Olim, and Arabs and Jews. Its productions shed light on human experiences and promote the values of dialogue, tolerance, and mutual respect.

The theater's repertoire currently includes 16 plays in Hebrew and five in English, which the organization hopes to produce worldwide. The theater conducts roughly 300 plays every year all over Israel, for people of diverse backgrounds and age groups. In addition, the theater has conducted over 200 performances overseas at international festivals, professional conventions, and universities for Jewish audiences and other groups.

== Repertoire ==
- Hana's Suitcase won an ASSITEJ prize for best interdisciplinary play for 2010–2011.
- One of a Kind won first prize at the Haifa Festival for Children's Plays. It was conducted in 2008 in North America (mostly on Broadway), and in 2011 in Toronto.
- Gimpel the Fool is a play based on the life story of Isaac Bashevis Singer, represented Israel at the Fringe Theater Festival in Edinburgh, and was performed in Armenia, Russia, and the Czech Republic.
- It Sounds Better in Amharic is an extended monologue by Yossi Vasa, which tells the story of Ethiopian Jews and their mass immigration to Israel. It was performed in Austria, Canada, the United States, and Mexico.

== See also ==
- Culture of Israel
- Habima Theatre
- Cameri Theater
- The Arab-Hebrew Theater
