= Adina Kamien =

American-born Israeli curator

- עדינה קמיאן
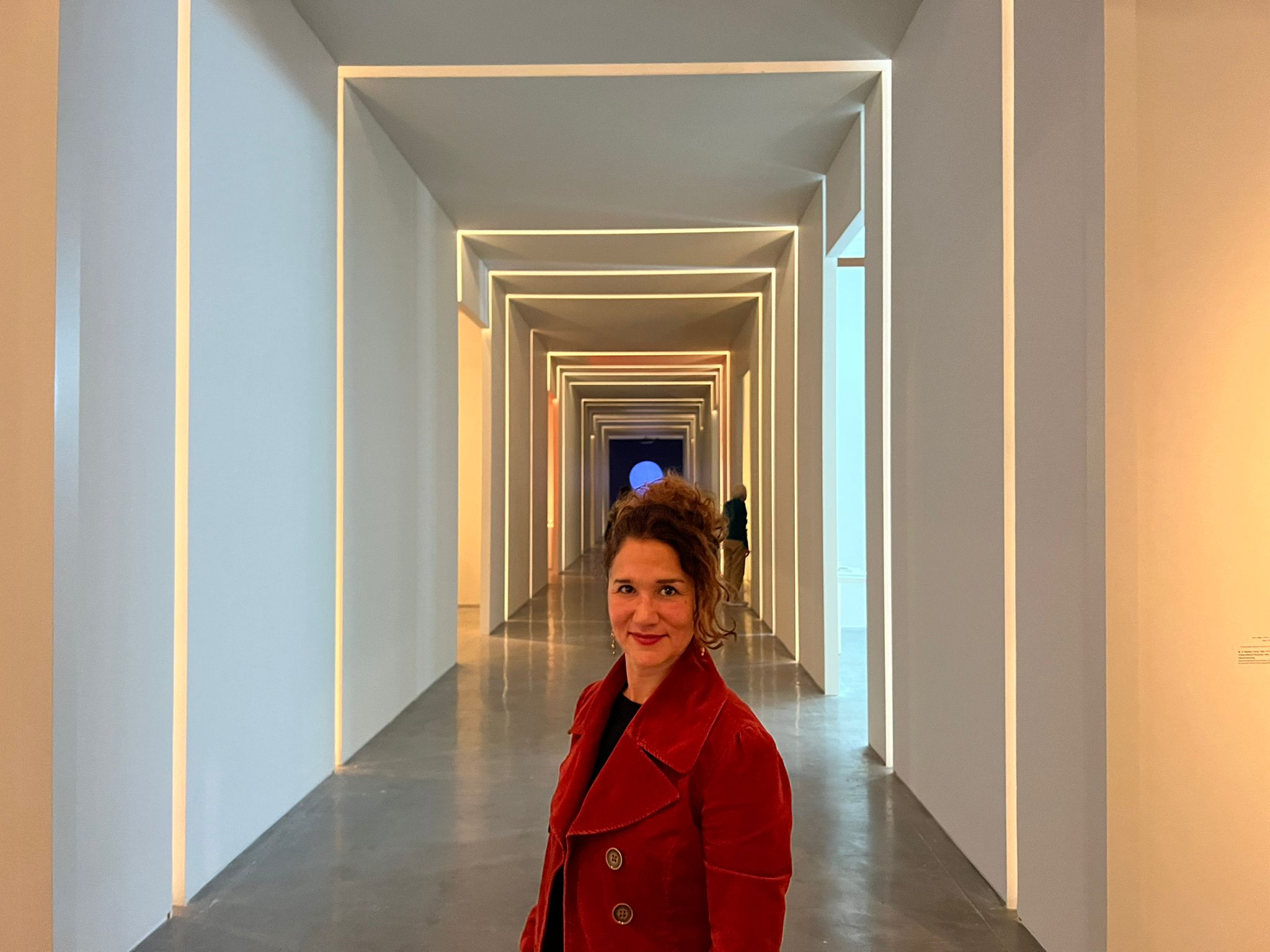
- Kamien at The Israel Museum
- Born: April 7, 1971 (age 55); New York
- Occupation: Art curator
- Website: Adina Kamien website

Adina Kamien (Hebrew: עדינה קמיאן; born April 7, 1971) is an American-born Israeli curator. She is senior curator and head of the Modern Art department at the Israel Museum, and a lecturer in modern art and curatorial studies at the Bezalel Academy of Arts and Design Jerusalem. She has curated numerous exhibitions in Israel, United States, Europe and Asia, and published widely on Dada and Surrealism.

== Biography ==
Adina Kamien was born in New York. In 1980, she immigrated to Israel, attending Pelech high school in Jerusalem. Her mother, Anita Kamien, is founder and conductor of the Hebrew University orchestra. Her father, Roger Kamien, is a musicologist and the author of Music: An Appreciation.

In 1989-1991, Kamien served in the Israel Defense Forces. In 1994, she graduated with honors from the Hebrew University of Jerusalem with a BA in Psychology and General Studies. She went on to earn MA degrees in Clinical Psychology and Art History in 2001. "Automatism and Rorschach: Probing the Unconscious," an article based on her thesis, was published in Surrealism and Beyond in the Israel Museum.

In 2012, Kamien was awarded a PhD from the Department of Art History and Theory at the University of Essex, England, which collaborates with the Centre for the Study of Surrealism and its Legacies then headed by Dawn Ades. Her dissertation, "Remaking the Readymade: Duchamp and Man Ray in the Galleria Schwarz," formed the basis for her book on the subject of originality and replication. During her doctoral studies, Kamien received the Overseas Research Scholarship awarded to international PhD students in the UK.

== Art career ==
In 1994, Kamien began working at the Israel Museum in the Modern Art Department as a freelance researcher, moving up to assistant curator and associate curator. In 2005, she was appointed head of the department, advancing to full curator in 2008. Since 2016, she has held the position of David Rockefeller senior curator and head of the Stella Fischbach Department of Modern Art. As senior curator, Kamien is responsible for international painting and sculpture from Impressionism through the 20th century. She oversaw the expansion and reinstallation of the Modern Art galleries during the renewal of the museum campus in 2007–2010.

=== Art curation ===
Combining her training in psychology and art history, Kamien chose to pursue a career as an art curator. She explains: "As a curator, I have the privilege of creating experiences that hopefully elevate us about our current harsh reality. One can wander through art and material culture in a dreamlike way, from room to room."In an interview with Kamien in 2025, she notes that her curatorial choices are sometimes based on the shidduch tradition, which is used in the Jewish community to find suitable marriage partners via introductions facilitated by a "shadchan" or matchmaker: "In curatorial practice...the act of placing seemingly unrelated artworks side by side becomes an act of interpretive matchmaking."

=== Teaching ===
Since 2014, Kamien has served as a lecturer in Modern Art at the Bezalel Academy of Art and Design in Jerusalem. From 2017 to 2019, she also taught courses in curating at the academy's Department of Architecture. Kamien has also taught at Shalem College and the Open University of Israel.

=== Research and scholarship ===
Kamien has written numerous articles on Dada and Surrealism, and published studies on the work of surrealist artists, among them Marcel Duchamp, Man Ray and Joan Miró. Her book "Remaking the Readymade: Duchamp, Man Ray, and the Conundrum of the Replica," published by Routledge, was described by Dalia Judovitz as a "must read for understanding the creative legacy of the ready-mades". The book examines the collaborative production of replicas and the implications for originality, authenticity and authorship.

=== Collection development ===
Collections for which Kamien is responsible include the Vera and Arturo Schwarz Collection of Dada and Surrealist Art and the Bergman House and Collection. During her tenure, Kamien expanded the museum's Modern Art department with significant acquisitions with an emphasis on pioneering female artists of the 1960s and 1970s, among them Yayoi Kusama, Luchita Hurtado, Carol Rama, Louise Bourgeois, Alina Szapocznikow. She has also chosen works by Man Ray and Gustav Klimt for the modern art collection.

== Notable exhibitions ==
Surrealism and Beyond (2007) was presented at the Israel Museum, the Cincinnati Art Museum (2009), the Hermitage in St.Petersburg (2014), the Hungarian National Gallery in Budapest (2014), the Palazzo Albergati in Bologna (2017), and Palacio Gaviria in Madrid (2018). In this exhibition, Kamien focused on key themes in Dada and Surrealism and included works by later artists who were influenced by these movements, such as a commissioned installation by the American artist Mark Dion.

Man Ray: Human Equations (2015), co-curated by Kamien with Wendy Grossman, Andrew Strauss and Edouard Sebline, focused on Man Ray's "Shakespearean Equations," inspired by his photographs of three-dimensional mathematical objects and displayed for the first time together with the original models from the Institut Henri Poincaré in Paris. The exhibition was also shown at The Phillips Collection in Washington and the Ny Carlsberg Glyptotek in Copenhagen.

Twilight over Berlin (2016) was a collaboration with the Neue Nationalgalerie on an exhibition of works from pre-World War II art movements such as German Expressionism, New Objectivity, Dada, and Bauhaus. Many of these works were outlawed by the Nazis as "degenerate". According to Kamien, the success of the show, which was extended due to popular demand, lay in the fact that "Israelis are very thirsty for the expression of a time that is so critical to our history."

No Place Like Home (2017), shown at the Israel Museum and the Berardo Collection Museum (2018) examined how contemporary artists have used household items in ways that subvert their everyday function and meanings. At a conference in 2017, Kamien spoke about what happens when objects-turned-artworks are placed in a "quasi-home" in the museum. The exhibition mimicked the layout of a home, complete with an Ikea-inspired catalogue. Among the highlights of the exhibit were Marcel Duchamp's repurposed urinal and the Japanese artist Yayoi Kusama's Untitled (Ironing Board)

Bodyscapes (2020) focused on the relationship between body, nature and the cosmos since prehistoric times. According to Kamien, humans over the ages have sought to tie the mysteries of the human body to rational structures, like geometry. An example is the work of Le Corbusier, who designed a measurement system based on body proportions.

Fields of Abstraction (2022) was a show of 43 abstract paintings from the Israel Museum's collection, 24 of them presented to the public for the first time. At the opening Kamien described abstract painting as "distilling the essence of things". "Fields of Abstraction" was named by Christie's as one of the best exhibitions in Asia-Pacific, Middle East and South America in 2022.

Umbilicus (2024), co-curated with Malu Zayon and mounted at the Kishle, a police station and former Turkish prison which is part of the Tower of David complex in Jerusalem, created a dialogue between archaeology and contemporary art. Kamien says one of her goals was to create a refuge in the trying times facing Israel after October 7.

Lucid Dreams (2024), an exhibition curated by Kamien at the Israel Museum, showcases 180 works that investigate dreams in art, material culture and new media from a multicultural perspective. The exhibition, marking the centenary of Andre Breton's Manifesto of Surrealism (1924), leads visitors through a long, lit corridor to multiple rooms that explore the "magical and fantastical imagery of dreams." The layout was inspired by Breton's 1935 surrealist assemblage "Dream Object," featuring cardboard doors set along a red hallway. The exhibition includes the work of international artists, such as the British-Nigerian artist Yinka Shonibare with his play on Francisco Goya's "The Sleep of Reason Produces Monsters," in addition to local artists.

At the core of the exhibition is Kamien's thesis that artists throughout history have used dreams, which are fundamental to surrealism, as a basis for experimentation and creative vision. She says the idea is for visitors to wander through the exhibit in a kind of dream state, not in a "linear line" but through an emotionally fraught "architecture of dreams."

== Published works ==
=== Books, articles and catalogues ===
- Kamien (ed.), Lucid Dreams, The Israel Museum, (Hebrew and English), 2024
- "Jacques Lipchitz: Sculptural Encounters," in: Judit Geskó and Anett Somodi (eds.), Lipchitz, A Cubist Sculptor, Museum of Fine Arts, Budapest, 2024
- Kamien (ed.), Fields of Abstraction, The Israel Museum, online catalogue (Hebrew, English, Arabic), 2022
- "Arching Back to Hysteria," in: Catherine Hug (ed.), Take Care: Art & Medicine, Kunsthaus, Zurich, 2022
- Kamien (ed.), Bodyscapes, The Israel Museum, Jerusalem, (Hebrew, English), 2020
- Kamien and Sharon Tager, "Lead in the Work of Anselm Kiefer at the Israel Museum," in: Sharon Hecker & Silvia Bottinelli (eds.), Lead in Modern and Contemporary Art, Bloomsbury Publishing, London, 2020
- "Marcel Duchamp through the Eyes of Arturo Schwarz: A Composite Interview," in: Duchamp-Koons, Massimiliano Gioni (ed.), Phaidon Books, 2019
- "Man Ray" in: Michael Richardson, et al (eds.), The International Encyclopedia of Surrealism, Bloomsbury Publishing, London, 2018
- Remaking the Readymade: Duchamp, Man Ray and the Conundrum of the Replica, Routledge, 2018
- Kamien (ed.), No Place Like Home, The Israel Museum, Jerusalem, 2017; Berardo Collection Museum, Lisbon, (Hebrew, English, Portuguese), 2018
- "Casting, Wrapping, and Replication: Marcel Duchamp and Man Ray's Malleable Creativity," in: Priere de Toucher, Museum Tinguely, Basel, 2017
- "Surrealist Chessboard," in: Duchamp, Chess and the Avantgarde, Fundacio Joan Miro, Barcelona, 2016
