= Jerusalem Walls =

Jerusalem Walls may refer to:

- Walls of Jerusalem, the surviving city walls of Jerusalem
- Broad Wall (Jerusalem), an ancient wall in Jerusalem
- Hasmonean walls, an ancient wall in Jerusalem
- Jerusalem Walls National Park, also called Jerusalem Walls-City of David National Park
- Walls of Jerusalem National Park, Tasmania, Australia
