= Anita Kamien =

American-born Israeli conductor and music educator (b. 1940)

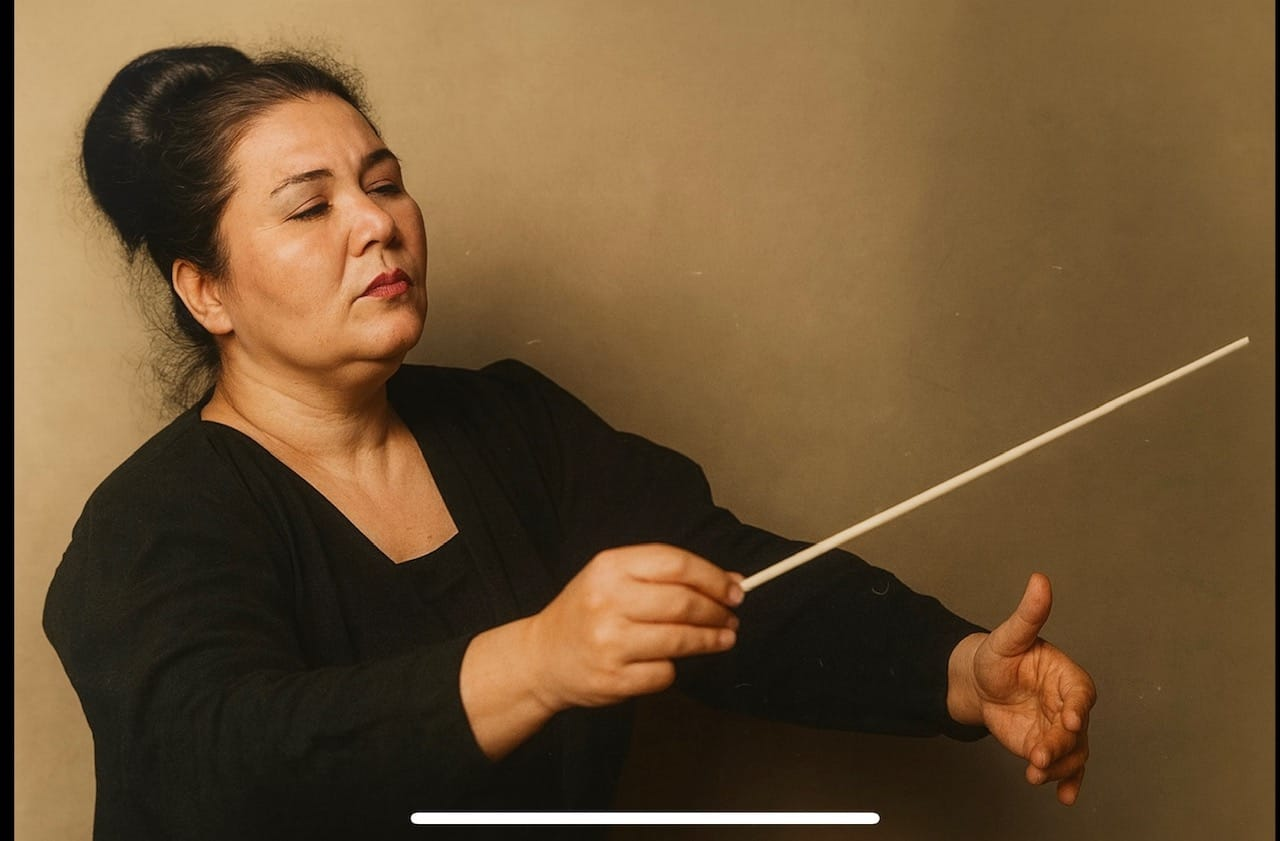
- Kamien in 2025
- Born: Anita Sackser; New York, U.S.
- Citizenship: Israel
- Occupations: Orchestral and choral conductor; music educator
- Known for: Founding the Hebrew University Orchestra

Anita Kamien (born July 23, 1940) is an American-born Israeli orchestral and choral conductor. She founded the Hebrew University Choir in 1983 and the Hebrew University Orchestra in Jerusalem in 1989. She has served as a guest conductor for chamber and choral ensembles in Israel and abroad.

== Biography ==
Anita Sackser (later Kamien) was born in New York. She studied piano with Hilda Stern Parker from 1949 to 1957 and appeared as a soloist in the Young Artists Series of the New York classical music station, WNYC, at the age of 13. After graduating from the High School of Performing Arts, she majored in music at Queens College and studied with Irwin Freundlich of the Juilliard School of Music. She studied harpsichord and organ at Accademia Santa Cecelia in Naples, Italy, and conducting at Mannes School of Music in New York City. She earned her MA from Queens College under Felix Salzer, a scholar of Schenkerian analysis.

In 1965, she married Roger Kamien, a pianist and musicologist, whom she met while teaching in the Queens College music department.

The couple has three children, two sons and a daughter. Adina Kamien, is senior art curator of modern art at the Israel Museum in Jerusalem.

== Music career ==
=== Conducting ===
In 1963, Kamien began her conducting career with RAI, the national broadcasting company of Italy. In 1983, she was asked to form the Hebrew University Choir. In 1989, she established the Hebrew University Orchestra, made up for the most part of university students. Under Kamien's baton, the orchestra has performed large-scale works such as Mendelssohn's Elijah and has collaborated with soloists and singers, among them violinist Itamar Zorman and soprano Sharon Azrieli.

Kamien has served as a guest conductor, directing chamber ensembles such as the Jerusalem-based King David String Ensemble whose repertoire ranges from Baroque to contemporary Israeli music.The Ensemble, founded in 1992, is composed of musicians from the former Soviet Union. Kamien was invited to direct them in 1997, when they only played baroque music. Under her direction they branched out into classical, romantic and modern music, including original works written for the Ensemble. The group has performed throughout Europe, Asia, Australia, North America and South America. Kamien describes them as ambassadors for Israel.

Kamien's concerts feature a wide range of orchestral and vocal works, and include guest appearances with the Jerusalem Symphony Orchestra and the Jerusalem Chamber Philharmonic.In 2017, she conducted a memorial concert commemorating Avraham Harman, chancellor of the university, at the Jerusalem Theatre.

=== Concert pianist ===
Over the years, Kamien has performed together with her husband, Roger Kamien. In 2013, she presented Mozart's Concerto for Two Pianos In 2013, they played Mozart's Concerto for Two Pianos which she conducted from the piano at a benefit concert with the Jerusalem Symphony Orchestra. Jerusalem Post music critic Uri Eppstein described the performance as "conjugal harmony" leading to "musical mutual attentiveness, resulting in an appealingly well-balanced and faithful-to-style rendition of Mozart's work."

=== Teaching ===
In addition to her work with the university, Kamien has pursued community music initiatives such as "Meet the Orchestra" that provide solo performance opportunities for non-conservatory musicians. She is the co-author of the textbook ‘’Music: An Appreciation,’’ written together with her husband, Roger Kamien.

== Selected media ==
- Brahms, Symphony No. 3, Hebrew University Orchestra (conductor: Anita Kamien)
- Dvořák, Cello Concerto, soloist Kirill Mihanovsky (conductor: Anita Kamien).
- Hebrew University Chamber Orchestra concert

== See also ==
- Music of Israel
