= Arturo Schwarz =

Italian art historian (1924–2021)

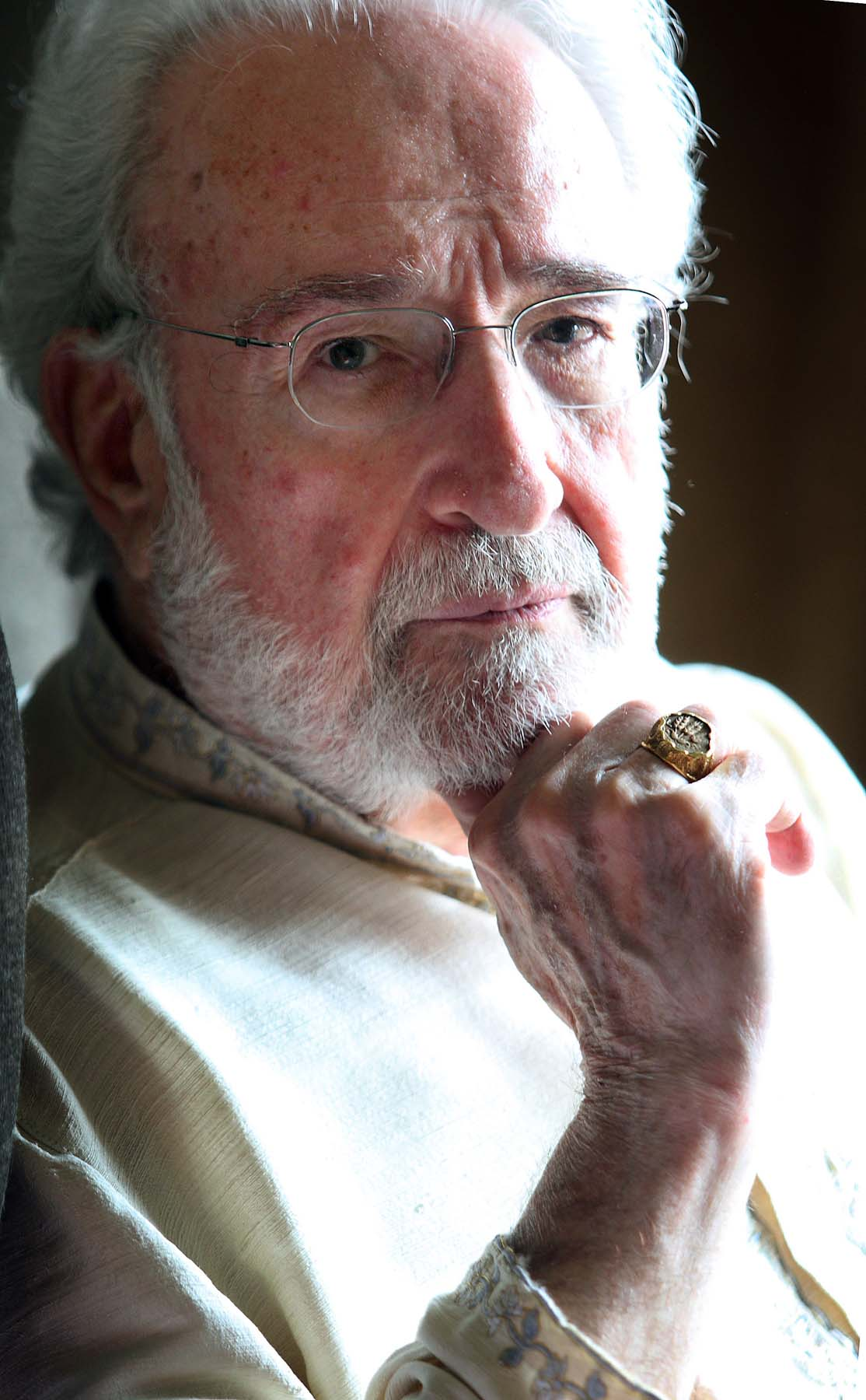
Arturo Schwarz

Arturo Umberto Samuele Schwarz (2 February 1924 – 23 June 2021) was an Italian scholar, art historian, poet, writer, lecturer, art consultant and curator of international art exhibitions. He lived in Milan, where he amassed a large collection of Dada and Surrealist art, including many works by personal friends such as Marcel Duchamp, André Breton, Man Ray, and Jean Arp.

== Biography ==
Schwarz was born in Alexandria, Egypt from a German father and an Italian mother. In 1952 he relocated to Milan, where he opened an independent art publishing house. In 1961 Schwarz converted his place into a gallery, organising exhibitions of Dada and Surrealism artists. The gallery officially closed in 1975, and Schwarz started working as curator and writer, writing extensive publications on the work of Marcel Duchamp, as well as books and numerous essays on the Kabbalah, Tantrism, alchemy, prehistoric and tribal art, and Asian art and philosophy. His 1977 book on Man Ray's works and life was the first to reveal Ray's real name (Emmanuel Radnitzky). A follower of Leon Trotsky, Schwarz published The Revolution Betrayed with a note which criticized Joseph Stalin.

In 1964, he published the portfolio The International Avant-Garde: America Discovered which included Andy Warhol's only intaglio print, Cooking Pot (1962).

In his essay "Alchemy, Androgyny, and Visual Artists," published in the winter 1980 edition of the periodical Leonardo (journal) he explored the relationship between hermaphroditism and Surrealism, and is identified as an analytical psychoanalyst.

Between 1972 and 1998, he donated his collection of Dada and Surrealist art to the Israel Museum in Jerusalem, including thirteen replicas of readymades by Marcel Duchamp (Vera and Arturo Schwarz Collection of Dada and Surrealist Art).

On 6 March 1998, he was awarded the Diploma of First Class with gold medal for outstanding merits in the fields of culture and the arts by the President of Italian Republic Oscar Luigi Scalfaro, on the recommendation of the Minister of Cultural Heritage Walter Veltroni.

In 2006 he won Italy's Premio Frascati for his collected works of poetry (1946–2007).

In October 2009 Schwarz curated an exhibition of Dada and Surrealism, "Dada e surrealismo riscoperti" (Dada And Surrealism Rediscovered), at the Vittoriano Museum Complex in Rome.

Schwarz died in Milan on 23 June 2021, at the age of 97.

== Selected works ==
- Marcel Duchamp: Sixty-six Creative Years; From the First Painting to the Last Drawing, Gallery Schwarz (Milan, Italy), 1972.
- New York Dada: Duchamp, Man Ray, Picabia, Prestel Verlag (Munich, Germany), 1973.
- Almanacco dada: Antologia letteraria-artistica, cronologia e repertorio delle riviste, Feltrinelli (Milan, Italy), 1976.
- Man Ray: The Rigour of Imagination, Rizzoli International (New York, NY), 1977.
- André Breton, Trotsky, et l'anarchie, Union Generale d'Editions (Paris, France), 1977.
- The Complete Works of Marcel Duchamp, H. N. Abrams (New York, NY), 1969, reprinted, Delano Greenidge (New York, NY), 1997.
- Peter Halley: Utopia’s Diagrams, Tema Celeste Editions and Gabrius Multimedia (Milan, Italy) 1998.

== See also ==
- Adina Kamien
