= Roger Kamien =

Roger Kamien רוג'ר קמיאן
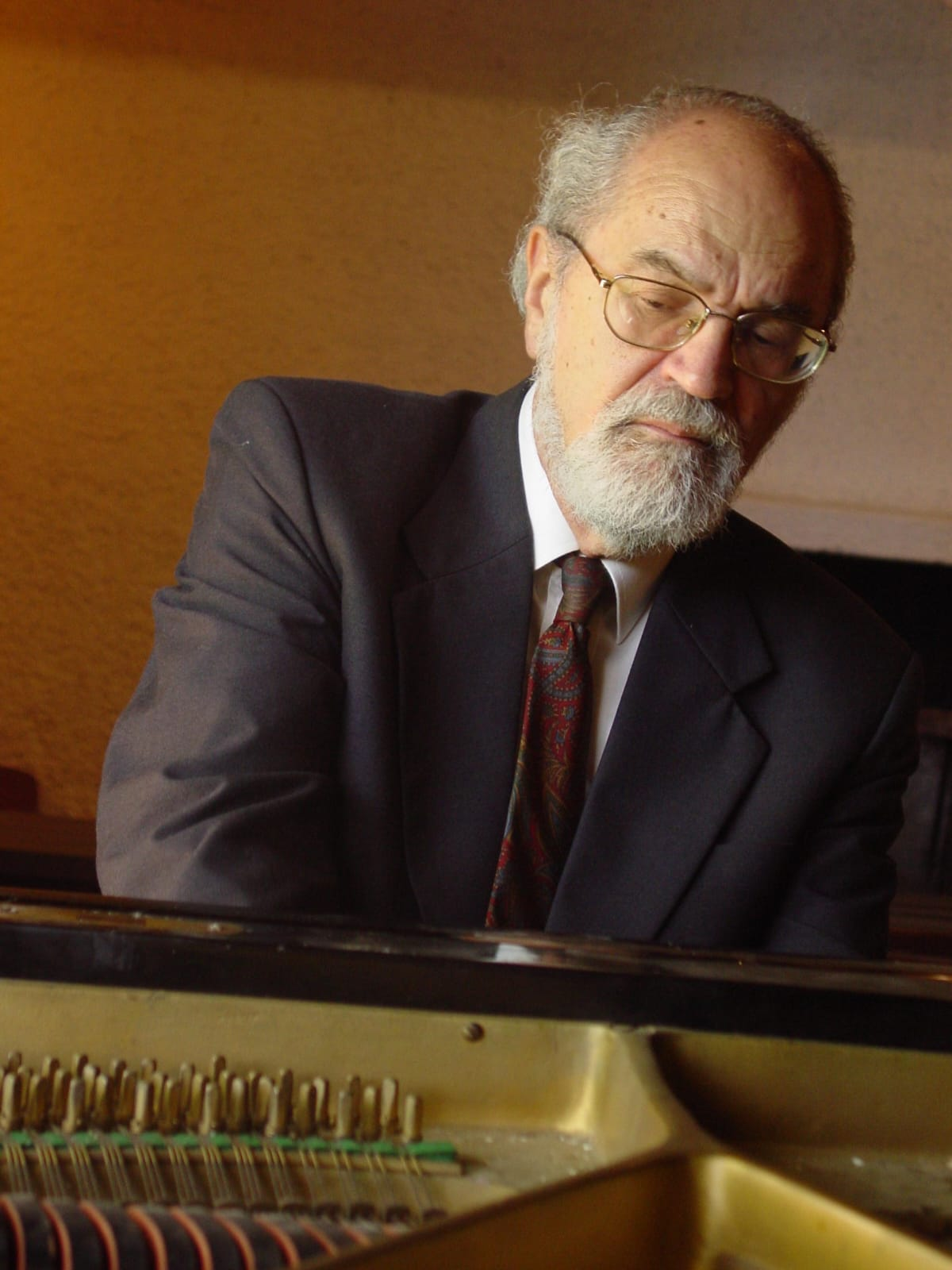

Background information
- Born: Paris
- Occupation: Musicologist
- Instrument: Piano

Roger Kamien (born 1934) is a professor emeritus of musicology at the Hebrew University of Jerusalem. He is the author of Music: An Appreciation, widely used as a textbook on the basics of music.

== Biography ==
Roger Kamien was born in Paris. His family moved to the United States when he was six months old. Kamien studied piano with Claudio Arrau and Nadia Reisenberg, and Schenkerian analysis with Felix Salzer and Ernst Oster. He earned a BA from Columbia University and obtained his doctoral degree from Princeton University in 1964. He spent two years in France as a Fulbright scholar.

Kamien immigrated to Israel in 1980. He and his wife, Anita, a conductor and pianist, have three children. His daughter, Adina Kamien, is an art curator who has organized many exhibitions at the Israel Museum in Jerusalem.

== Music career ==
Kamien taught at Hunter College and then at Queens College, New York, for twenty years. In 1980, after moving to Israel, he began teaching at Bar-Ilan University. In 1983, he was appointed to the Zubin Mehta Chair of Musicology at the Hebrew University of Jerusalem. On his tours as a concert pianist, he often played duets with his wife, Anita.

Kamien developed the concept of the listening outline, which he incorporated into the first edition of Music: An Appreciation and has refined and enhanced in subsequent editions. This is a text intended for students of all levels and backgrounds. The book, which comes bundled with a multimedia CD-ROM has been published in 16 editions to date.

Kamien is the editor of Norton Scores and the author of numerous academic articles on musicology. In "Beethoven’s Piano Sonatas in the Context of his Other Works", for example, he maintains that Beethoven composed many more piano sonatas than symphonies or string quartets.

Kamien's textbook on music appreciation, published by McGraw-Hill, is widely used in high schools and colleges as a basis for understanding classical and modern music.

== Awards and recognition ==
Bach to Brahms: Essays on Musical Design and Structure, a volume of fifteen essays published in 2015, was dedicated to Kamien for his contribution to music theory and teaching.

=== Reviews ===
- Music: An Appreciation
  - Music Educators Journal November 2001 v 88 p. 69
  - Teaching Music August 1998 v 6 p.44
- Norton Scores (book review)
  - Library Journal September 1, 1972 p. 2712
  - Opera News October 12, 1968 p. 30
  - Library Journal October 1, 1968 p. 3564
  - The New York Times Book Review September 8, 1968 p. 22

== See also ==
- Music of Israel
