= Music appreciation =

Aspect of musicology

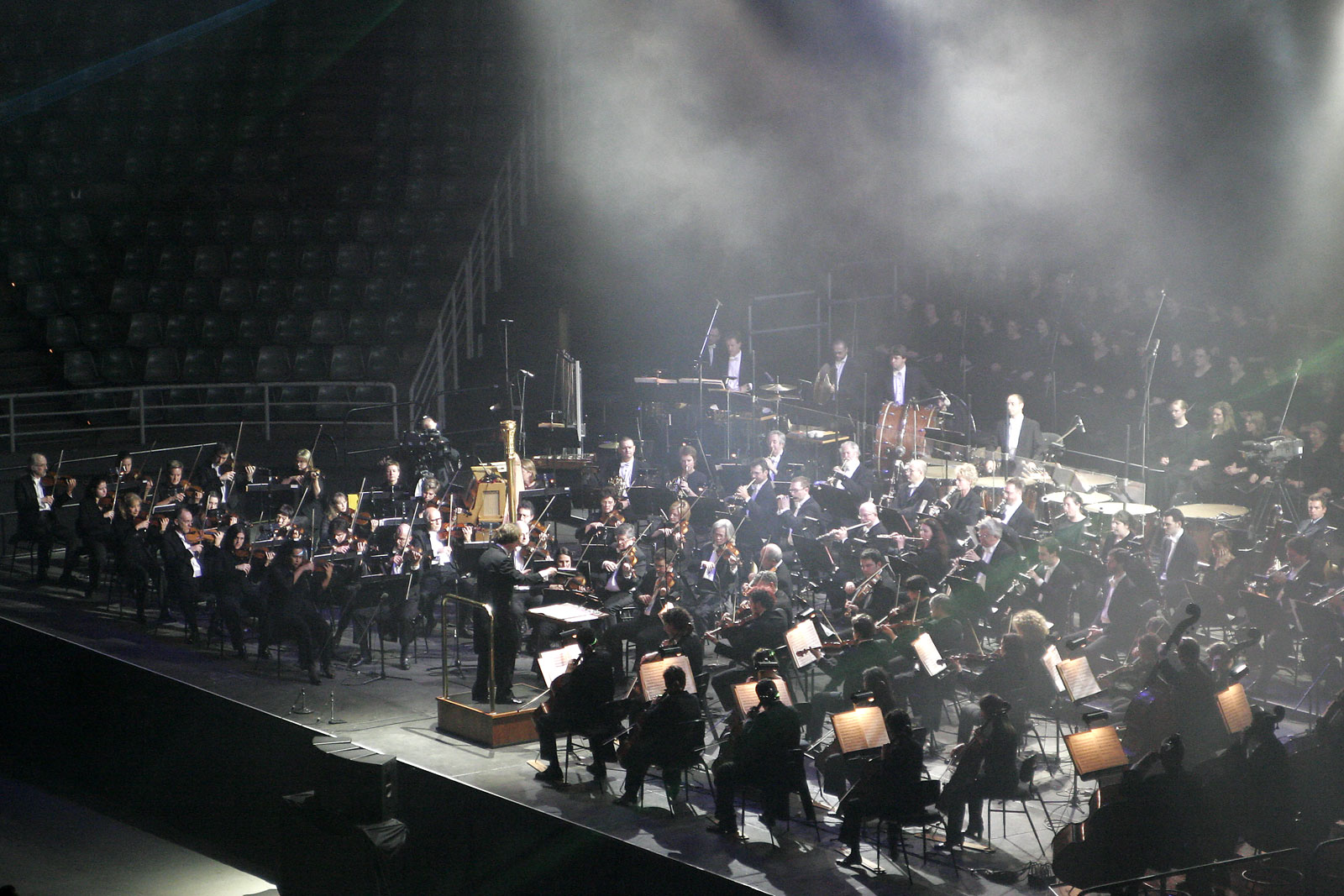
The culminating point in some music appreciation classes is going out to hear a live performance.

Music appreciation is a division of musicology that is designed to teach students how to understand and describe the contexts and creative processes involved in music composition.

The concept of music appreciation is often taught as a subset of music theory in higher education and focuses predominantly on Western art music, commonly called loosely "Classical music". This study of music is classified in a number of ways, including (but not limited to) examining music literacy and core musical elements such as pitch, duration, structure, texture and expressive techniques. It explores the aesthetic theories associated with the listening experience in addition to an explorative history of music.

Music appreciation classes also typically include information about the composers, the instruments and ensembles, and the different styles of music from an era. Courses revolving around this material are often designed for non-music tertiary students. Students learn how to listen and respond to recordings or live performances of musical pieces or excerpts from pieces such as symphonies, opera arias and concertos.

"Appreciation," in this context, means the understanding of the value and merit of different styles of music. The term “appreciation” has roots in philosophy, where it is described in a musical sense as a “kind of formal analogue of emotional experience”. It can be associated with musical criticism, and is used to describe the positive and negative responses of a given musical work from a scholarly perspective.

== Music literacy ==
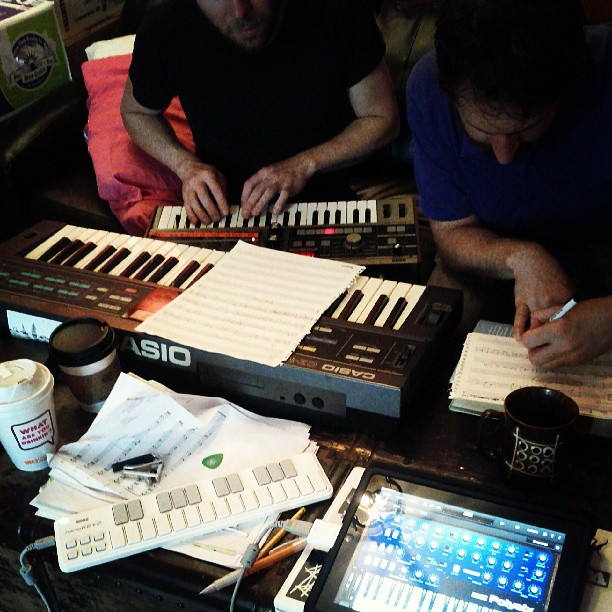
Kayo Dot using synths and recording Hubardo album, 2013

Music Literacy analyses the defining concepts of a given musical work. Students learn to critically analyse and articulate a series of music systems and their rudimentary elements, as well as to better understand musical notation and the tuning systems followed by composers in order to create music.

=== Fundamentals of music ===
The Fundamentals of Music are used as a scope term to describe a number of phenomena applied to the study of music theory, including divisions of melody and harmony, form and tonal structure, rhythm and orchestration, and performative techniques. Students should be able to assess a given work of music and make a critical report on the fundamentals of music involved.

==== Pitch ====
Indicated melodies, modes, harmonies, chords, register and range.

Pitch governs melody and harmony, and is established by observing the order of notes in a work relative to a given musical scale. Students learn how to distinguish and notate relevant keys, scales, chord, register, and relevant modes.

==== Duration ====
Rhythm, pulse, tempo, metre and note values and rests.

Duration, also referred to as rhythm, assesses the meter (or time signature), and the values of notes and rests and their accents or stresses.

==== Dynamics & expressive techniques ====
Loud/soft, mood of music, directorial details to enhance or add variety.

Dynamics refers to the louds and softs of a sound, often described in Italian abbreviations. This category also analyses means of articulation or prescribed musical expression to guide a performer in replicating the composer's musical intent. Some instruments, predominantly strings, have unique or non-traditional methods of producing these differing sounds, (also referred to as expressive or extended techniques).

==== Structure ====
Designated form or order of a musical work. Part organization.

Structure, also called musical form, distinguishes the shape of a piece of music in regard to its length, sections, and any similarities or identified repetition. There are a number of labelling procedures and identifies for musical genres with fixed ordinances and rules.

==== Texture ====
How “thin” or “thick” the individual layers of tempo, melody, and harmony are in an overall piece of music, e.g. homophony versus polyphony.

Texture refers to the overall layering (or separation) of multiple sounds and the resulting quality of sound. It is most commonly referred to as being “thick” or “thin” based on the density and range of pitches and diversity of instruments present in a work. Common textural types include monophonic and homophonic.

==== Timbre ====
Identifying instrumentation, using adjectives to describe the nature of an instrument or its sound production.

Timbre, also referred to as tone colour, defines the use of adjectives to describe distinctive sounds or voicing of various musical instruments or voices based on the way they are played or the sound of their material. It is important to observe changes in sounding technique and analyse emotions and moods incited by a given musical work.

Whilst not all students undertaking a course in Music Appreciation will be fluent in reading music, there is a basic understanding of musical notation required in order to correctly analyse a given musical work.

== Music appreciation in media ==
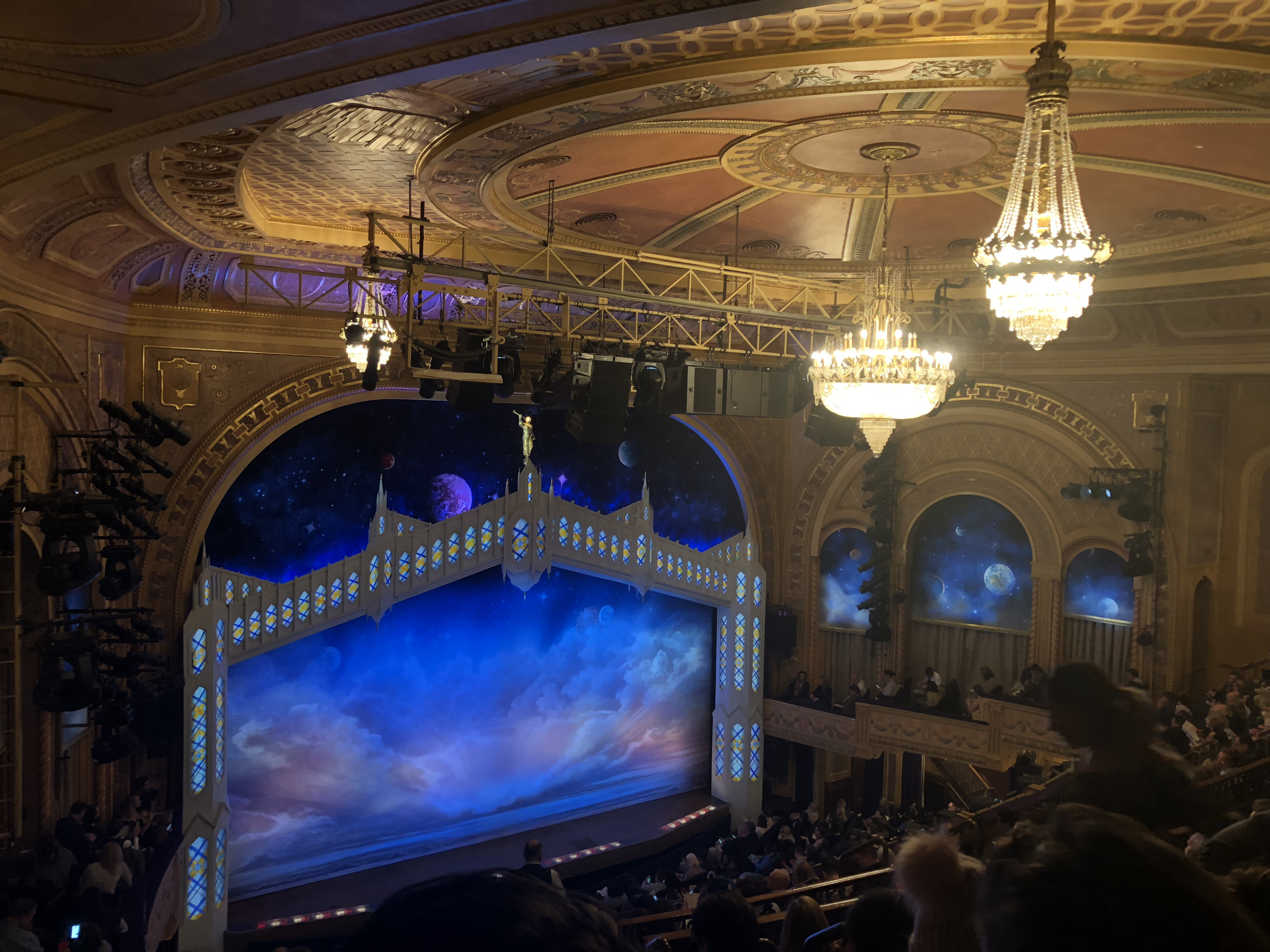
Music appreciation can be applied to all kinds of musical performance, including live musical theatre.

Music can be appreciated in diverse mediums such as cinematography, theatre, and dance. For the post-millennial generation, music is now a commonplace integration with our lifestyles, and students studying music appreciation should seek to establish the underlying messages of artistic intent within their indirect consumption of musicology.

Music is holistically variable and evolves to accommodate its medium. By introducing the medium of film, students learn to understand how the concept of music accompanying visual media can be applied to skills of composition and develop a more holistic understanding of the influences of musical techniques by analysing film music. In associating different genres of film media to musical media, we can ascertain similarities in musical conventions and various influences of more classical music at a narrative level.

For those undertaking further education in the music theory field, exposure to live performances and musical media is beneficial in providing a real-world understanding of the applications of music appreciation. Students should consider what makes music memorable, and establish links between compositional techniques in a film score and the intended accompanying narrative. They delve into the compositional process by observing musical relevance within the context of a larger work and learn to examine how musicians develop unique style or meaning. Students learn to consider the significance and interpretation of lyrics or musical similarities as a greater whole and discuss meaning for the intended audience.

== See also ==
- Roger Kamien
