= Dalia Judovitz =

- Born: 1951 (age 74–75); Transylvania, Romania

Academic background
- Education: Johns Hopkins University

Academic work
- Discipline: Philosopher
- Institutions: Emory University

Dalia Judovitz (born 1951, Transylvania, Romania) is National Endowment for the Humanities Professor in the Department of French and Italian at Emory University. She is known for her work in the fields of 17th-century French literature and philosophy and modern/postmodern aesthetics.

== Education ==
She earned her Ph.D. from the Department of Romance Studies at Johns Hopkins University in 1979. French philosophers on the faculty Louis Marin, Jacques Derrida, Jean-François Lyotard, Rodolphe Gasché and René Girard shaped the theoretical outlook of her cross-disciplinary approach.

== Career ==
She held several terms as chair of the Department of French and Italian at Emory University, helping to build its international research reputation. Previously, she taught at University of California at Berkeley and University of Pennsylvania and held visiting appointments at Columbia University and Duke University.

== Work ==
Her first major work identifies Cartesian subjectivity as a foundational moment of modernity whose problematic legacy is difficult to overcome. Along with Martin Heidegger and Jacques Derrida, she analyzes the philosophical import of Cartesian discourse through inquiries into its linguistic, literary and rhetorical presentation. She demonstrates how Cartesian subjectivity, reflecting a new understanding of truth as certitude, implies a new, disembodied way of being in and picturing the world.

The question of what the body is and how it is culturally constructed, conceived and cultivated is the focus of her 2001 book. The Culture of the Body outlines the body's redefinition from a live, experiential entity to a mechanical and virtual object heralding the advent of modernity. Maurice Merleau-Ponty and Michel Foucault inform this study of embodiment and materialization.

Her books on Marcel Duchamp and Dada and Surrealist aesthetics explore how the interplay of word and image (à la Walter Benjamin) shapes modernist avant-garde strategies by enlarging the horizons of subjective and sensorial experience. She "unpacks" Duchamp's works through an analysis of his use of mechanical and linguistic reproduction to redefine the work, the artist and artistic production. This approach leads to a new understanding of "an art made out of the paradoxes inherent in the making of art." A 2010 book considers how appropriation, influence and play redefine notions of artistic creativity as a collaborative act. This book discusses Francis Picabia, Man Ray, Salvador Dali and Enrico Baj, as well as post-modern legacies in works by Gordon Matta-Clark and Richard Wilson.

Her most recent book questions the nature of vision and visibility through an examination of the depiction of sight and spiritual insight in the paintings of Georges de La Tour, a 17th-century French baroque artist.

== Books ==
- Georges de la Tour and the Enigma of the Visible, Fordham University Press, 2017. ISBN 9780823277445
- Drawing on Art: Duchamp and Company, University of Minnesota Press, 2010. ISBN 978-0-8166-6530-3
- The Culture of the Body: Genealogies of Modernity, University of Michigan Press, 2001. ISBN 978-0-472-06742-8
- Déplier Duchamp: Passages de l'art, Presses Universitaires du Septentrion, 2000. ISBN 978-2-85939-610-7
- Unpacking Duchamp: Art in Transit, University of California Press, 1995. ISBN 9780520213760
- Dialectic and Narrative (co-edited with Thomas R. Flynn), State University of New York Press, 1993. ISBN 0-7914-1456-6
- Subjectivity and Representation in Descartes: The Origins of Modernity, Cambridge University Press, 1988. ISBN 0521326486

=== Book series ===
- The Body, in Theory: Histories of Cultural Materialism (co-edited with James I. Porter), University of Michigan Press, 1995-2005.
