= Hasmonean walls =

2nd-century wall around Jerusalem

Coordinates: 31°46′32″N 35°13′42″E

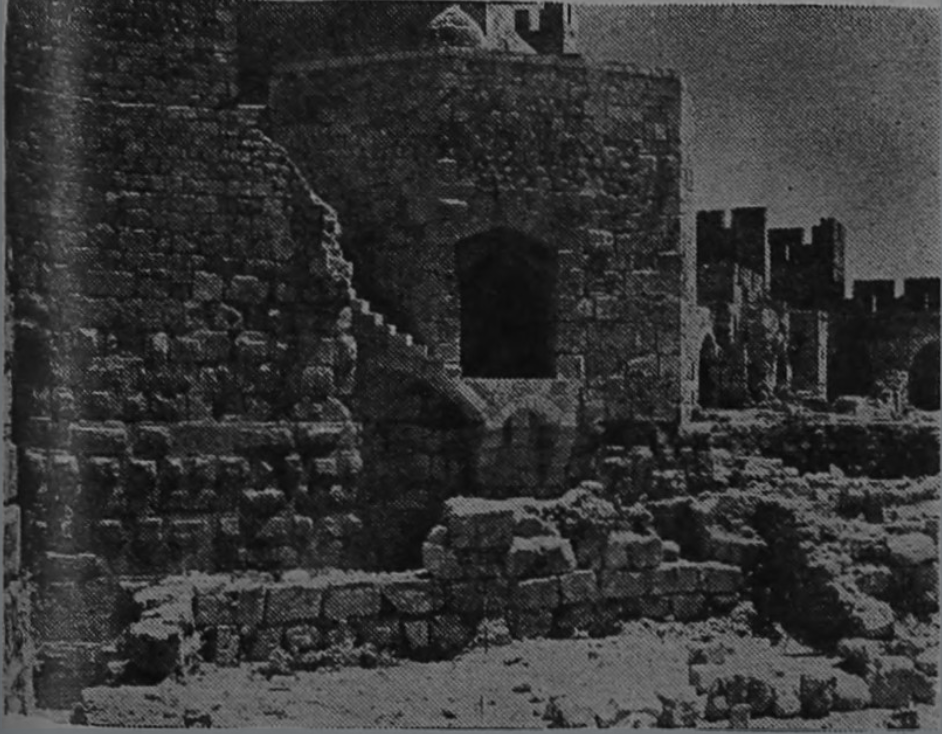
The Hasmonean wall, photographed in 1946 for the newspaper ha-Galgal.

The Hasmonean walls or First Wall (Hebrew: החומה הראשונה) surrounded Jerusalem and was built in the late 2nd century BCE by the Hasmonean Kingdom. The walls encircled the city during the Second Temple period. The walls were mostly destroyed later in the century, and parts of the ruins were buried under the palace of King Herod. In many places, only the wall's foundations remain intact. The first excavations occurred in the 19th century.

== Description ==
The Hasmonean walls surrounded the area of Old City of Jerusalem and Mount Zion during the Second Temple period.

Archaeologist Amit Re'em stated in 2025 that sections of the Hasmonean city wall were found at Mount Zion, in the City of David, in the courtyard of the Jerusalem Citadel, and alongside the outer façade of the Old City's current western wall. The longest continuous and best-preserved section was unearthed in the Kishle area, where as of December 2025 it measured over 50 metres in length at 5 metres wide. The walls may have been higher than the current surviving Jerusalem walls, being estimated at around 10 metres tall. According to the writings of ancient historian Josephus, the walls had 60 watchtowers. The walls protected mainly the southerly section of the city.

The wall is believed to have been built in the late 2nd century BCE by the Hasmonean dynasty, shortly after the story of Hanukkah. Construction began no earlier than 140 BCE.

The walls are made of white limestone, found in similar Hasmonean-era buildings elsewhere in Israel, and were built without concrete or mortar. The walls are in a chiseled style typical of the time.

== Destruction ==
Some of the walls, specifically the area examined in 2025, appear from excavations to have been uniformly dismantled outside of war. Specifically, the areas excavated in 2025 around Herod's palace have been destroyed down to the foundations. Other sections of the wall that have been discovered are more complete.

Around 134 BCE, Jerusalem was besieged by the army of Antiochus VII. In exchange for a ceasefire and relief from the siege, the Hasmonean leader John Hyrcanus agreed to dismantle the Jerusalem walls, pay tribute to the Seleucid king, and send prisoners. Another possible explanation for the destruction of the walls was that Herod the Great had ordered the walls destroyed following the Roman conquest of Judea and the siege of Jerusalem in order to show a concrete political change from the old government.

== Excavations ==
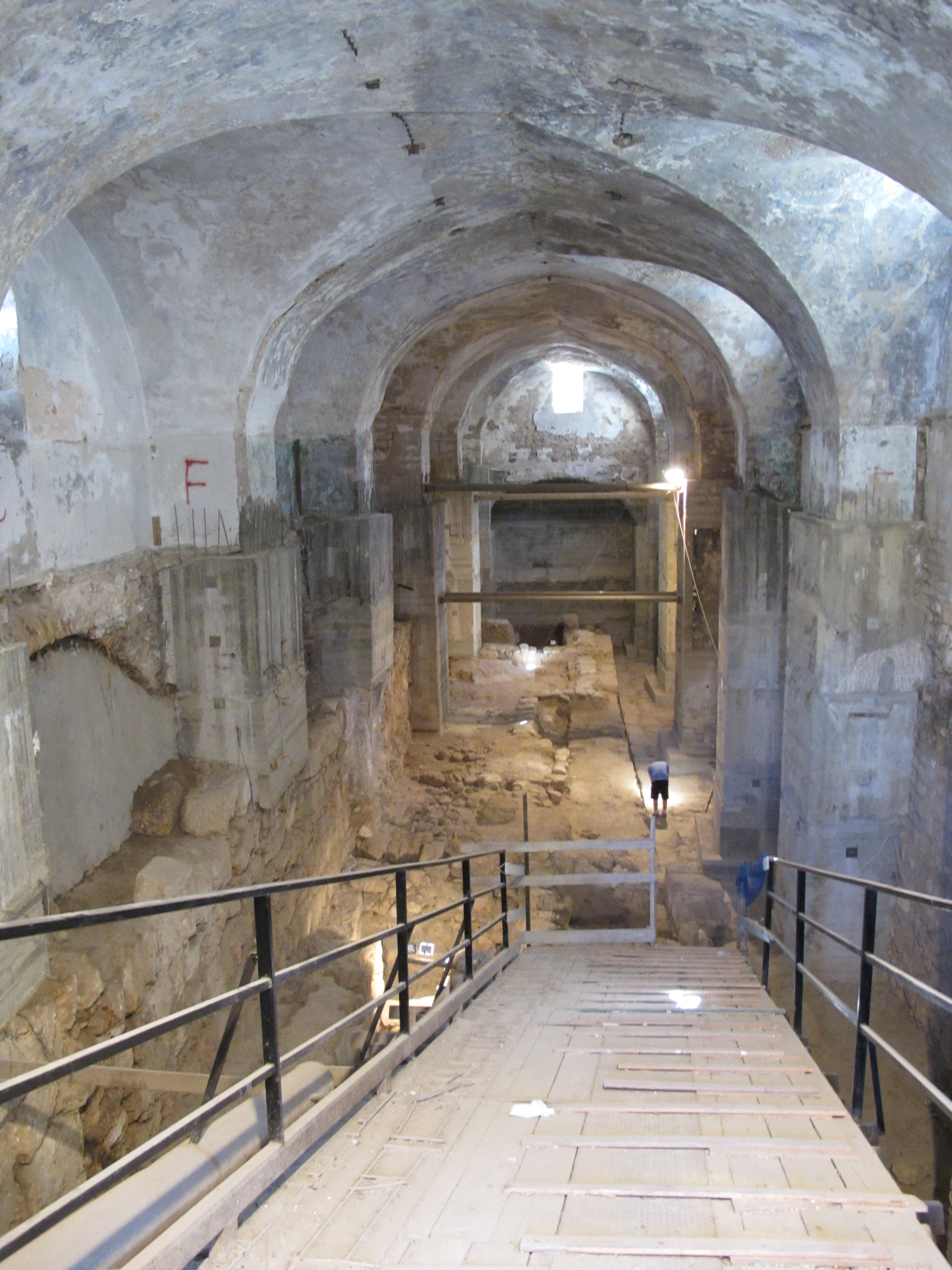
Excavations under the Kishle prison in 2013.

The area was first excavated in the 19th century by the British Palestine Exploration Fund. Archaeologists in the 1980s discovered artefacts such as arrowheads and sling-stones near the wall. In 1999, excavations began in earnest around possible wall sites. In 2008, large parts of the ruins were rediscovered after archaeologists located the site of the 19th century dig using updated maps and item left by the excavators. In 2025, one of the largest intact ruins of the foundations yet far were excavated, revealing more information about the status of the wall and its destruction. The area excavated in this section is located underneath the Kishle prison. At least three surviving towers have been found from the First Wall.

There are plans for the ruins to be displayed in the Shulich Archaeology, Art and Innovation Wing in the Tower of David Museum, where a transparent glass floor will be built.

=== Historical dating ===
The stone used to build the walls is also found in other Hasmonean buildings in the region. Coins and ceramics were also found that date to the Hasmonean period. The stratigraphic location of the walls also supports dating to the Hasmonean era; the remains of the walls are located above First Temple-era ruins and below Herod's palace. However, radiocarbon dating was unable to be performed.

== See also ==
- Broad Wall, the previous wall surrounding Jerusalem
- Walls of Jerusalem, the Ottoman-built surviving walls
