= Judit Geskó =

Judit Geskó (born 3 June 1954) is a Hungarian art historian and curator, scientific adviser at the Museum of Fine Arts, Budapest, vice-president of the Société Paul Cézanne in France, and a recipient of the French Legion of Honour.

== Career ==
Geskó was born in Miskolc, Hungary and graduated from the Spanish-language programme at the local Herman Ottó Secondary School. At Eötvös Loránd University, she studied history and Spanish from 1972 to 1977 and art history from 1975 to 1980. She earned her PhD in 2001 with a dissertation entitled “A conservative in favour of the moderns. Pál Majovszky’s (1871–1935) collection of nineteenth-century European drawings”. Her main areas of scientific research are the history nineteenth-century French art and collecting, and twentieth-century and contemporary Hungarian and international art history.

Geskó has worked at the Museum of Fine Arts, Budapest, since 1977. In 1986 she joined the Collection of Paintings and the Collection of Prints and Drawings, and from 2005 to 2018 she was head of the Collection of International Art after 1800; she subsequently became scientific adviser at the museum.

Following in the footsteps of Teréz Gerszi and János György Szilágyi, Geskó's work is rooted in the Museum of Fine Arts, Budapest, Hungary's foremost collection of international art, where she is a leading researcher and curator. She has curated monographic exhibitions devoted to artists including György Jovánovics, Dóra Maurer, Márta Pan, Tamás Konok, Vera Molnár, Victor Vasarely and Simon Hantaï. She pioneered efforts to involve outstanding contemporary artists in the museum's professional activities: from 1980 to 1983 she ran a photography workshop at the museum with Dóra Maurer, and from 1981 to 1984 she organised drawing sessions with Miklós Erdély.

Among her most significant achievements is a series of monographic exhibitions presenting the masters of French Impressionism to Hungarian audiences. Based on international collections and original research, the series began with Monet and his Friends in 2003 and has since focused on Vincent van Gogh, Paul Cézanne and Paul Gauguin, among others.

She has received numerous honours for promoting French culture. In 2010, following nominations by the directors of the Musée d’Orsay and the Musée du Louvre in Paris, she was appointed an Officer of the French Order of Arts and Letters; in 2023, she was made a Knight of the Legion of Honour, France's highest order of merit.

She has been a member of Eötvös József Collegium since 1972. She became a member of the General Assembly of the Hungarian Academy of Sciences in 2012 and an honorary member of the Széchenyi Academy of Literature and Arts in 2022.

She joined the French Société Paul Cézanne in 2013, later served on its board, and became its vice-president in 2023.

Since 2013, she has served as chief artistic adviser to the Vaszary Gallery in Balatonfüred, with responsibility for its exhibition programme. She performs a similar role at the Modern Art Center, also in Balatonfüred, which opened in 2023.

Her father was a teacher, her mother a nursery-school teacher. Her first husband, from 1974 to 1983, was Zoltán Paulinyi (born 1953), a professor at the Universidad de Chile. Their son, Gergely Paulinyi (born 1975), is an architect and a recipient of the Ybl Prize. She has three grandchildren. Her second husband, from 1983 until 2019, was the distinguished heritage conservation specialist and art historian Ferenc Dávid (1940–2019).

== Selected exhibitions as curator or co-curator ==
- 2026. Bonjour Monsieur Gauguin. Museum of Fine Arts, Budapest
- 2025. Resonance. István Nádler Exhibition. Vaszary Gallery, Balatonfüred (with Dávid Fehér)
- 2024. Lipchitz. A Cubist Sculptor. Museum of Fine Arts, Budapest (with Anett Somodi)
- 2022. Hantaï, Klee and Other Abstractions. Museum of Fine Arts, Budapest
- 2021. Cezanne to Malevich. Arcadia to Abstraction. Museum of Fine Arts, Budapest
- 2012. Cézanne and the Past. Tradition and Creativity. Museum of Fine Arts, Budapest
- 2011. The Path of a Tree. Museum of Fine Arts, Budapest, 2011 (with Péter Nádas)
- 2010. Vera Molnar, Cézanne. Museum of Fine Arts, Budapest (with Mónika Kumin)
- 2009. Hommage à Jovánovics. Museum of Fine Arts, Budapest
- 2009. Márta Pán. Museum of Fine Arts, Budapest (with Mónika Kumin)
- 2007. Picasso, Klee, Kandinsky. Masterpieces from the Swiss Rupf Collection. Museum of Fine Arts, Budapest
- 2006. Van Gogh in Budapest. Museum of Fine Arts, Budapest
- 2006. Picasso in Love. Museum of Fine Arts, Budapest (with Márton Orosz)
- 2003. Monet and his Friends. Museum of Fine Arts, Budapest
- 2003. The Turn of the Century 1800: European Prints and Drawings. Museum of Fine Arts, Budapest (with Andrea Czére and Zsuzsa Gonda)
- 1999. Pictures from a Private Collection. Works by Miró, Tàpies, Chillida, Alechinsky and their Contemporaries in the Marghescu Collection. Museum of Fine Arts, Budapest
- 1993. Museum of Fine Arts, Collection of Prints and Drawings: New Acquisitions 1989-1993. Museum of Fine Arts, Budapest
- 1988. Museum of Fine Arts, Collection of Prints and Drawings: New Acquisitions 1978-1988. Museum of Fine Arts, Budapest (with Teréz Gerszi)
- 1987. Stamp Images. Museum of Fine Arts, Budapest
- 1987. Hans Hinterreiter. Works from the Zurich Collection of István Schlégl. Museum of Fine Arts, Budapest
- 1985. Victor Vasarely Exhibition. Szombathely Gallery, Szombathely and Damjanich Museum, Szolnok
- 1981. Exhibition of the Painter Tamás Konok. Museum of Fine Arts, Budapest

== Selected publications as author, editor or co-editor ==
- Judit Geskó and Anett Somodi (eds.), Lipchitz. A Cubist Sculptor. Museum of Fine Arts, Budapest, 2024
- Judit Geskó (ed.), Hantaï, Klee and Other Abstractions. Museum of Fine Arts, Budapest, 2022
- Judit Geskó (et al.), Cezanne to Malevich. Arcadia to Abstraction. Museum of Fine Arts, Budapest, 2021
- Judit Geskó (ed.), Cézanne and the Past. Tradition and Creativity. Museum of Fine Arts, Budapest, 2012
- Judit Geskó, The Path of a Tree. Museum of Fine Arts, Budapest, 2011
- Judit Geskó and Mónika Kumin (eds.), Vera Molnar, Cézanne. Museum of Fine Arts, Budapest, 2010
- Judit Geskó, Hommage à Jovánovics. Museum of Fine Arts, Budapest, 2009
- Judit Geskó and Mónika Kumin (eds.), Márta Pán. Museum of Fine Arts, Budapest, 2009
- Judit Geskó, Picasso, Klee, Kandinsky. Masterpieces from the Swiss Rupf Collection. Museum of Fine Arts – Vincze Kiadó, Budapest, 2007
- Judit Geskó (ed.), Van Gogh in Budapest. Museum of Fine Arts – Vincze Kiadó, Budapest, 2006
- Judit Geskó (ed.), Monet and his Friends. Museum of Fine Arts – Vincze Kiadó, Budapest, 2003
- Andrea Czére, Judit Geskó and Zsuzsa Gonda, The Turn of the Century 1800: European Prints and Drawings. Museum of Fine Arts, Budapest, 2003
- Judit Geskó, “The collecting of French Impressionist and Post-Impressionist art in Hungary before 1918.” In: Szilvia Bodnár (ed.), Permanence and Change. Art History Conference, Ráckeve, 2000. MTA Művészettörténeti Kutatóintézet, Képző- és Iparművészeti Lektorátus, Budapest, 2000, pp. 441–465
- Judit Geskó, Pictures from a Private Collection. Works by Miró, Tàpies, Chillida, Alechinsky and their Contemporaries in the Marghescu Collection. Museum of Fine Arts, Budapest, 1999
- Judit Geskó (ed.), Stamp Images. Museum of Fine Arts, Budapest, 1987
- Judit Geskó (ed.), Hans Hinterreiter. Works from the Zurich Collection of István Schlégl. Museum of Fine Arts, Budapest, 1987
- Judit Geskó (ed.), Tradition and the Present. Russian and Soviet Painting. Exhibition of Works from the Museum of Fine Arts, Kuybyshev, the Tretyakov Gallery, and the Ministry of Culture of the Soviet Union. Museum of Fine Arts, Budapest, 1985
- Judit Geskó, Modern Prints and Drawings. Múzsák Közművelődési Kiadó, Budapest, 1985
- Judit Geskó (ed.), Soviet Art in the 1920s and 1930s. NPI, Budapest, 1983

== Selected awards and honours ==
- 2026. Lajos Németh Prize
- 2023. Knight of the French Legion of Honour
- 2018. Budapest, Hungarian Academy of Sciences, Art History Committee, Opus Mirabile Award
- 2017. Elek Petrovics Prize
- 2013. Budapest, Hungarian Academy of Sciences, Art History Committee, Opus Mirabile Award
- 2013. Middle Cross (Commander's Cross) of the Hungarian Order of Merit
- 2010. Officer of the French Order of Arts and Letters
- 2006. Knight of the French Order of Arts and Letters
- 2005. Elek Petrovics Prize
- 2004. Officer's Cross of the Order of Merit of the Republic of Hungary
- 2004. Budapest, Hungarian Academy of Sciences, Art History Committee, Opus Mirabile Award
- 1988. Award for Socialist Culture
- 1983. Award for Socialist Culture
