= Kishle =

Historic building in Jerusalem

- קישלה
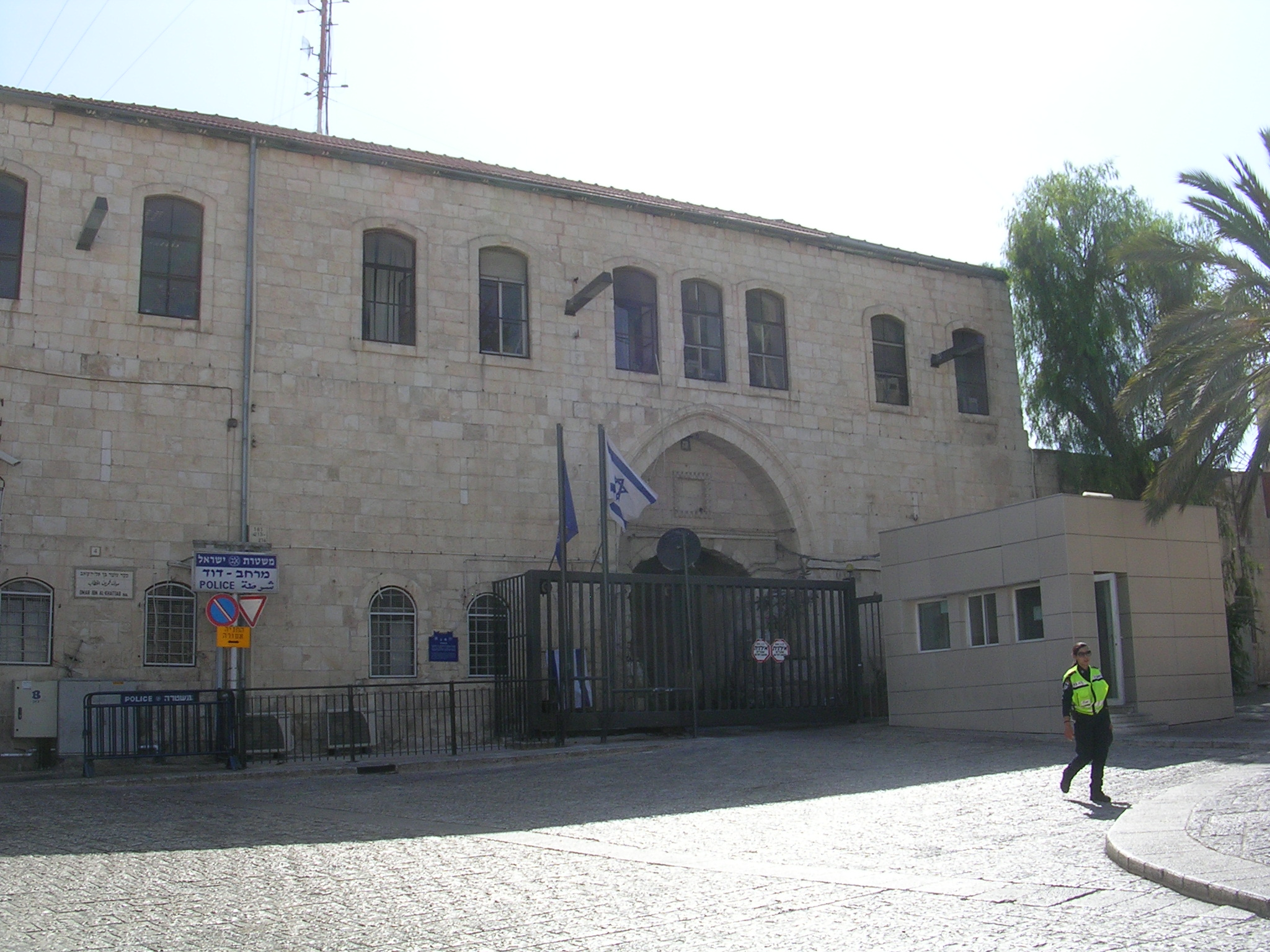
- Interactive map of the Kishle area
- Alternative names: Kishleh, Kishla, Qishla
- Etymology: Turkish Kışla

General information
- Location: Jerusalem
- Coordinates: 31°46′32″N 35°13′42″E
- Year built: 1834

The Kishle (Note: Alternate names or transliterations include Kishleh, Kishla, and Qishla.) (Hebrew: קישלה, Arabic: قشلة القدس, Turkish: Kışla) is a former prison and military base in Jerusalem. The building was constructed in 1834 by the Egyptian Eyalet as military barracks and later became a prison. The Kishle is today part of the Tower of David Museum.

== History ==
=== Ottomans ===
The Kishle was constructed in 1834 by Ibrahim Pasha. Its original purpose was for winter military barracks. In 1841, control over the area was transferred to the Ottoman Empire.

=== British Mandate ===
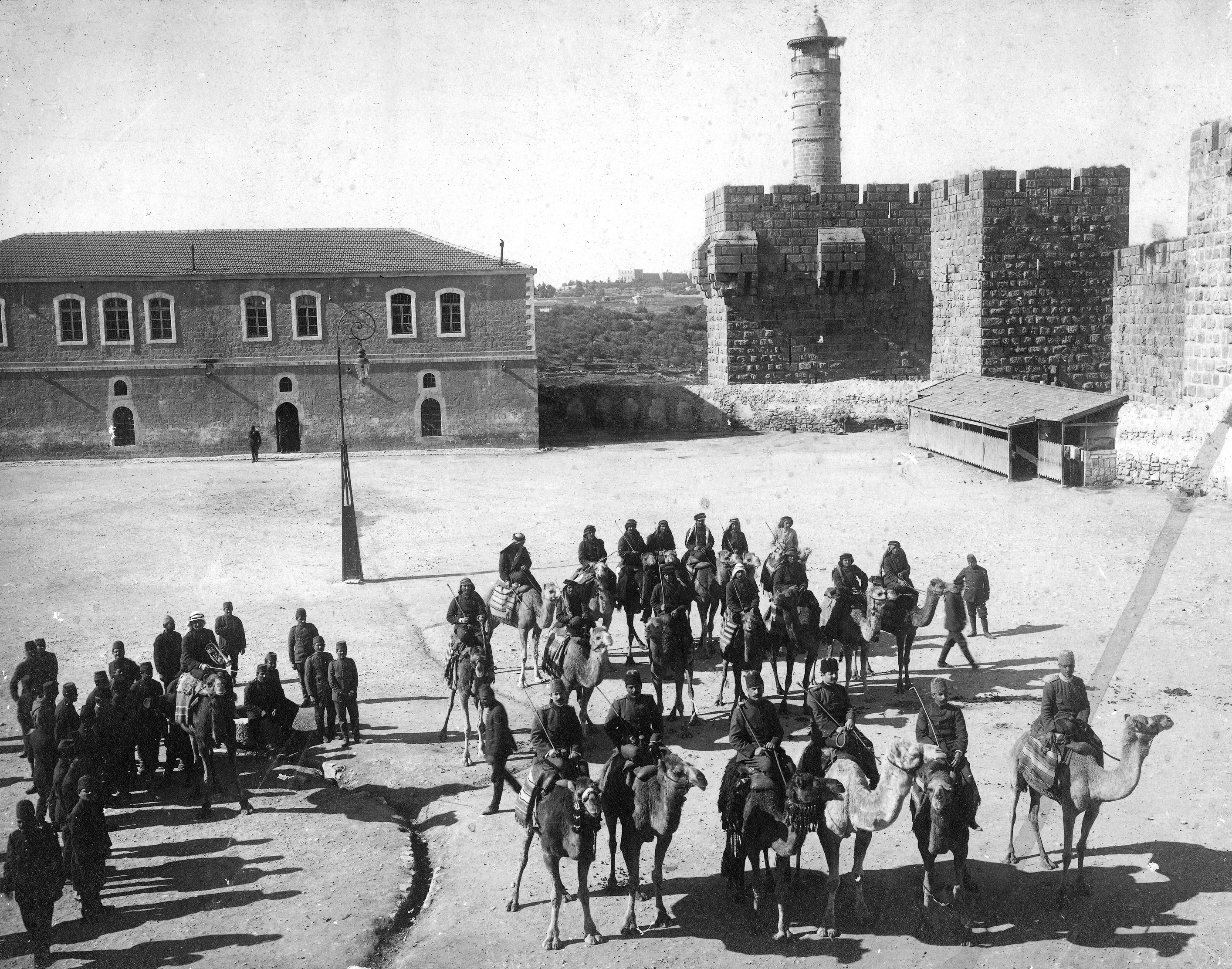
Turkish soldiers in the courtyard of the Kishle, taken in 1910.

During the British Mandate period, the Kishle was used as a prison. Many members of underground Israeli resistance movements were jailed there. Conditions in the prison were reportedly bad, with the prisoners "afraid to go out ... for a walk". (Note: Untranslated text: "האסיריםו היהודים בקישלה חוששים לצאת לרחבת הכלא לטיול.") Several of the imprisoned drew images into the walls of their cells, such as maps of "Greater Israel".

=== Jordan ===
In 1948 the area of the Old City in East Jerusalem was handed over to Jordan. During this period, it continued to function as a prison.

=== Israel ===
The area was occupied by Israel in 1967 and the building came under control of the Kirya Police, which made it their headquarters. During this time, it still functioned as a prison. The prison was criticised in the 1990s for human rights abuses. As of January 2011, the building still houses a Jerusalem police headquarters. The Kishle also contains a stable, which collapsed in 1984 but was rebuilt, as well as a synagogue and social hall. The building is now part of the Tower of David Museum and is open for public visits.

== Architecture ==
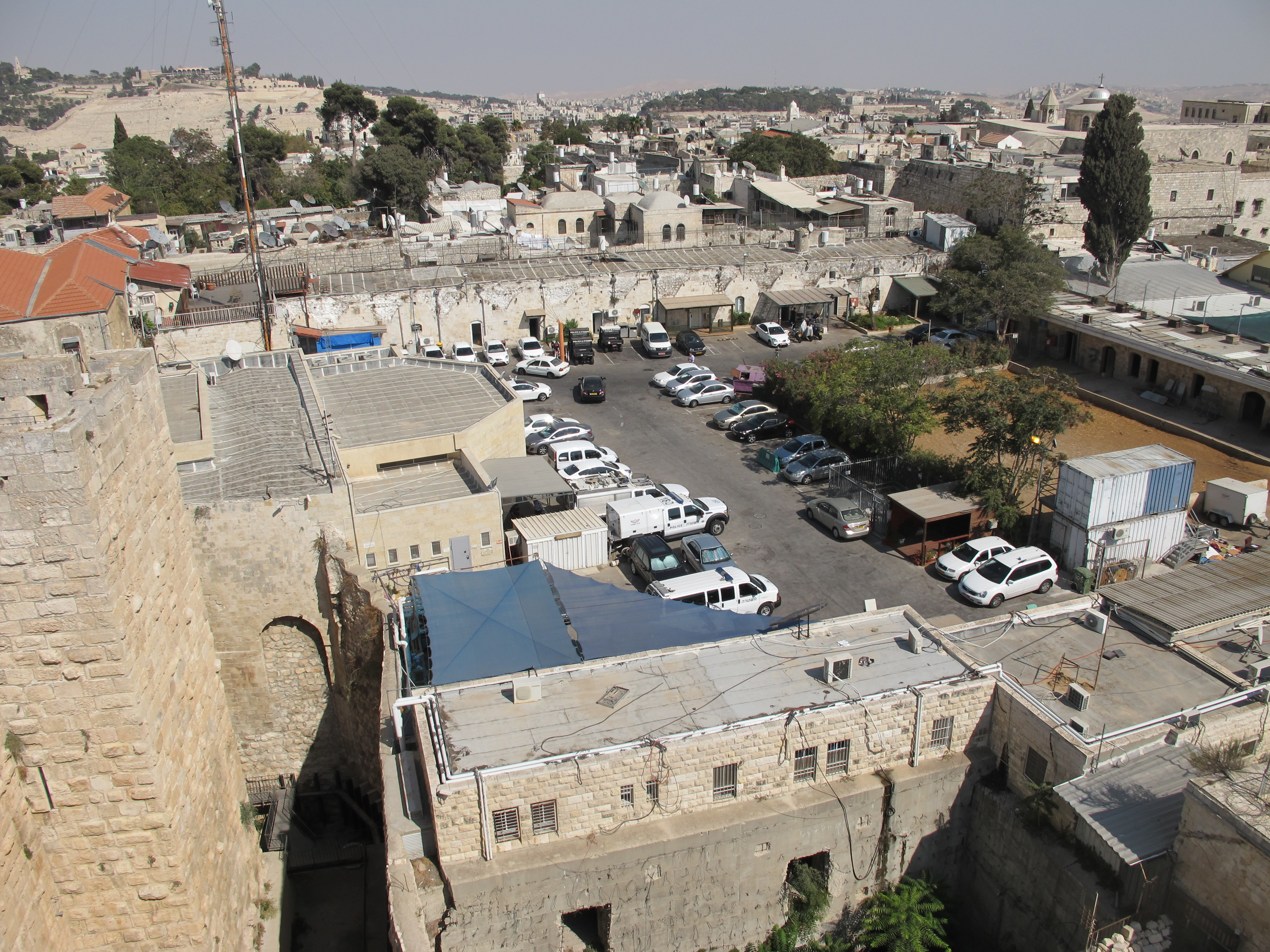
The Kishle in 2013, taken from the spire of the Tower of David.

The architecture of the building is typical of Ottoman military architecture from the mid-19th century. The Kishle has thick limestone walls, vaulted ceilings, and a layout to accommodate both barracks and a prison. The building is also notable for its heavy use of masonry. A tunnel was built from the Kishle to outside of the city walls. The building's area is over 450 square metres and is 45 metres (150 feet) long.

== Archaeology ==
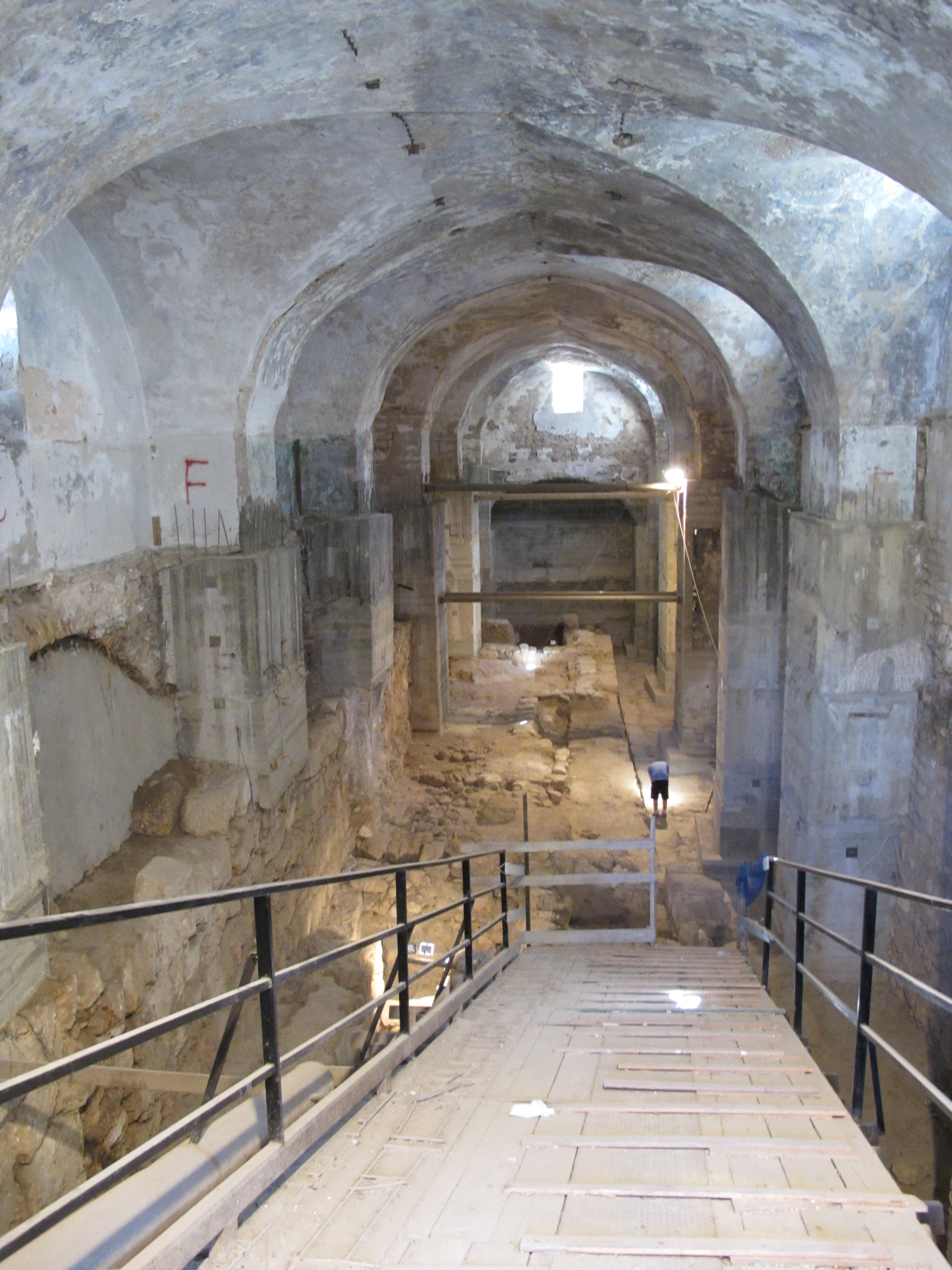
Excavations under the Kishle in 2013.

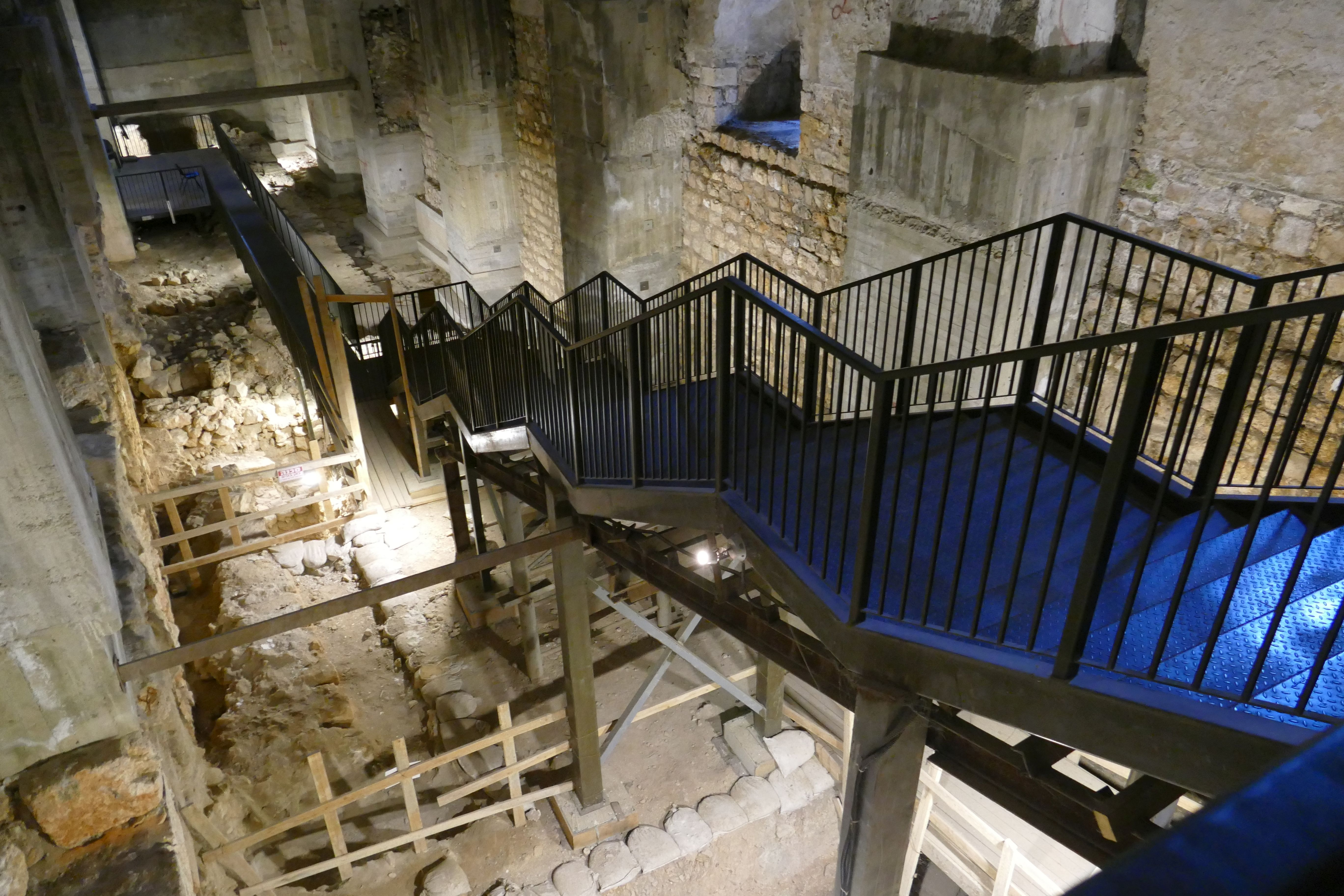
The area under the Kishle's western wall, pictured in 2021.

The earliest ruins found under the Kishle are from the First Temple period. King Hezekiah built a wall near the building to protect against the invading Assyrians. Above these are walls from the Second Temple period, built by the Hasmoneans. Extensive buildings from King Herod's projects have also been found. King Herod may have even built his palace on the site.

During the Crusades, defences were built in the area that have now been incorporated into the modern city walls. Dying vats that are thought to have been used by Jews in the Middle Ages were also found at the Kishle.
