= Adam's Rock =

Israeli island

Coordinates: 32.0232°N 34.7365°E

Native name: Sela Adam
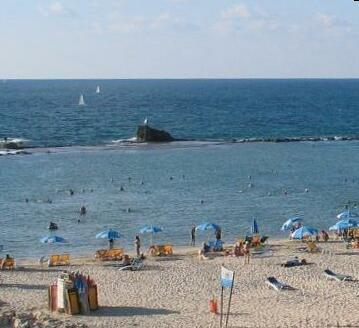
- Adam Rock, Bat Yam's Rock Beach and the breakwaters

- Location within Central Israel Location within Tel Aviv Location within Israel

Geography
- Location: Bat Yam, Israel

Administration
- Israel
- District: Tel Aviv
- City: Bat Yam

Demographics
- Population: none

Adam's Rock (Hebrew: סלע אדם – Sela Adam; Arabic: حجر آدم) or Adam's Island (Hebrew: סלע אדם – Ie Adam; Arabic: جزيرة آدم) is a tiny Israeli island about half a kilometer west of Bat Yam. A smaller rock (island) is located 10 m west of Adam Rock.

== Geology and geomorphology ==
Adam's Rock is a protrusion in an abrasion platform, a remnant of an ancient kurkar ridge. This ridge was unevenly destroyed in abrasion, a process of grinding and erosion.

== History ==
The beach near the island is known as Rock Beach, after the tiny island opposite the beach. Until the breakwaters at the Rock Beach in Bat Yam were built in the late 1960s, the rock could only be reached swimming or sailing. Swimming there was and still is a common activity among bathers.

The nature researcher and tour guide Yehuda Ziv wrote about the island:

The southernmost of Jaffa's reefs, opposite the beach of Bat Yam, is known in Arabic as 'Hajar Adam' – Adam's Rock. The legend tells us that the fish in the Mediterranean come here in bands, kiss the rock, and continue on their way... The island was swallowed up among the large stone boulders that were piled up in front of Bat Yam's seashore to protect its beach, barely visible from the promenade".

The legend and name were previously mentioned by Zev Vilnay, who dates these back to the Middle Ages.
