= Binyamin Kahane =

Israeli Air Force officer

- בנימין כהנא
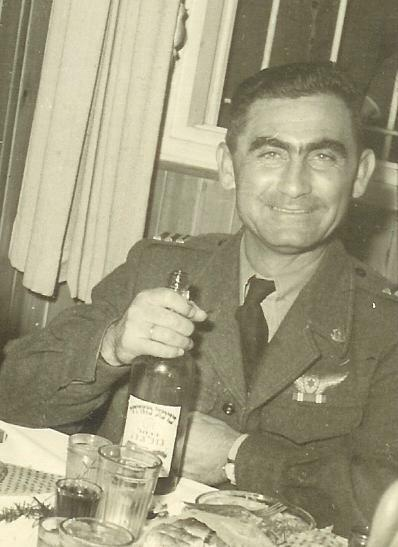
- Born: March 5, 1911; Jaffa, Mutasarrifate of Jerusalem
- Died: October 30, 1956 (aged 45)
- Occupation: Pilot
- Military career
- Allegiance: Israel Defense Forces, Irgun
- Service years: 1948–1956
- Rank: Seren (Capt.)
- Conflicts: 1948 Arab–Israeli War; Sinai War
- Awards: Medal of Courage

Binyamin Kahane (Hebrew: בנימין כהנא; 5 March 1911 – 30 October 1956), was an Israeli Air Force officer and pilot who was killed during a reconnaissance sortie. He was awarded the Medal of Courage by the Israel Defense Forces posthumously. The aerial tactics he used are taught at military air academies worldwide.

== Biography ==
Binyamin Kahane was born in Jaffa in what was then the Mutasarrifate of Jerusalem, an administrative district of the Ottoman Empire, to a family with roots in the First Aliyah (immigration) from Belarus. Kahane was the youngest of three brothers and a sister. He attended a trade school in Tel Aviv, an agricultural high school (Mikve Israel), the Polytechnic School, and the Montefiore Technical School in Tel Aviv.

Both of Kahane's parents were involved with Zionist movements: His mother, Miriam Kahane, was part of the Bilu movement, a small pioneer group brought to Israel and led by her cousin, Israel Belkind. Another cousin was Fannie Belkind, Avshalom Feinberg's mother. Kahane's father, Ephraim, assisted the Nili underground in its activities to support the British forces during World War I. Because of his familiarity with the Sinai Peninsula and the routes in Palestine (and also as a carriage driver and owner), he was selected by Avshalom Feinberg to accompany him on his first trip to the British lines in Egypt through the northern Sinai in December 1915. Kahane engaged in boxing, fencing and Jujitsu, but his main activity was motorcycle riding. He took part in many riding competitions, and according to press reports from 1934, he was "one of the best motorcycle riders in the country." He won first place in the first motorcycle race held in the dunes of Rishon LeZion. In 1934 Kahane co-organized and co-led a motorcycle tour to Jewish communities in Europe to encourage immigration to Palestine.

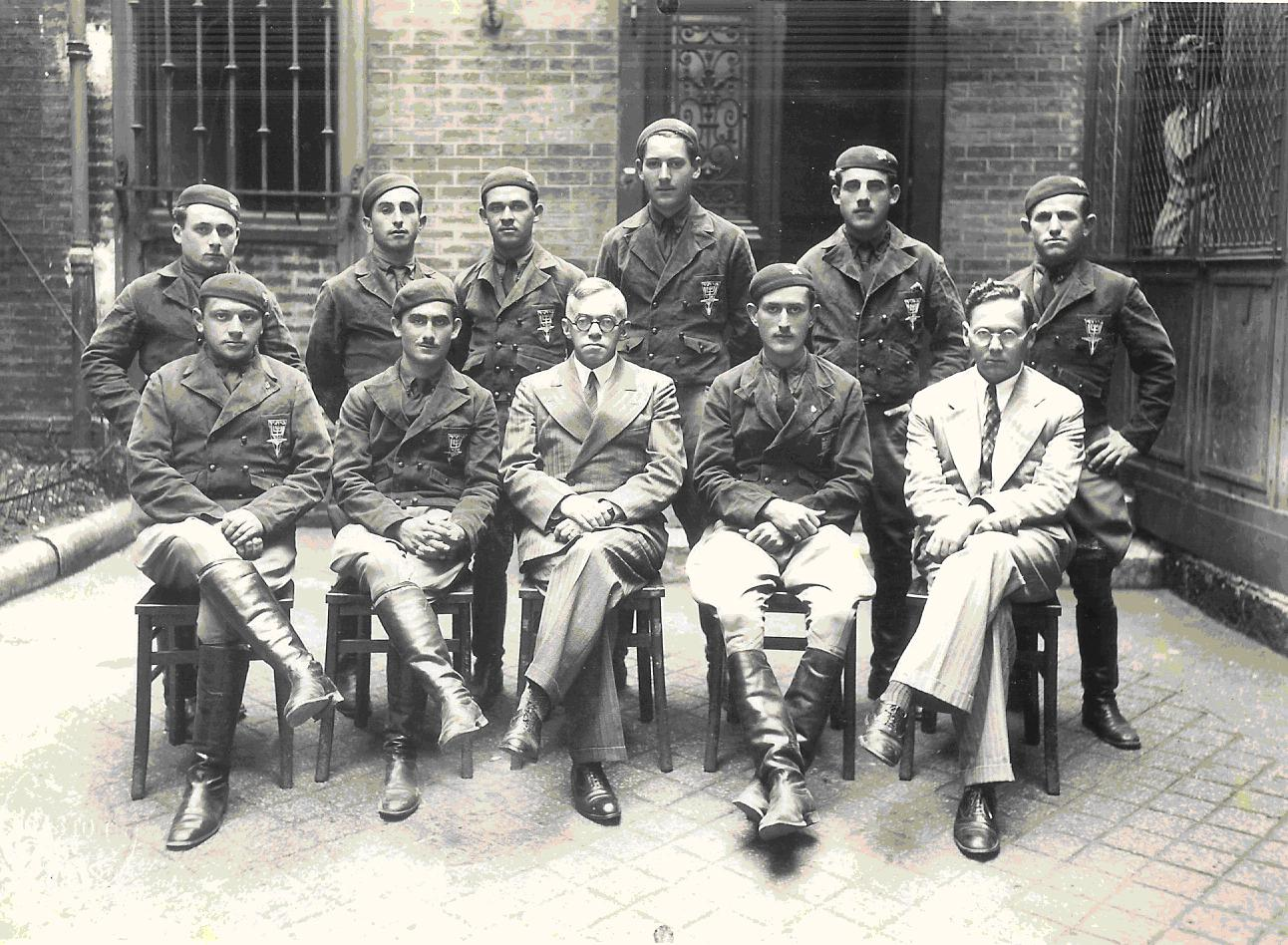
Betar motorcyclists meeting with Ze'ev Jabotinsky in Paris, 1934

== Political activism ==
He joined the Betar movement in 1927, and like many members of Betar, proceeded to join the Irgun upon its establishment. He received training and participated in operations intended to help secure Jewish settlements. He applied his skills as a motorcyclist as part of reprisals conducted by the Irgun during the Great Arab Revolt. After the establishment of the Notrim, Kahane joined it and attended its command training course in 1937.

== Aviation ==
Kahane was an avid aviator since his early twenties. His first aerial activity was gliding as a member of The Aero Club of Israel. Devoting himself to aviation, Kahane developed extraordinary skills and achieved notoriety, also turning to training others along the Mediterranean coast. On his website "Air Space" that specializes in aviation history, Avinoam Misnikov cites that in April 1938, at the gliding camp of Children Village, Kahane reached an altitude of 1,250 feet above the point of origin while flying a Chaika glider. In 1936 Kahane participated in the first gliding training course sponsored by the Palestine Aviation Club and held at Givat Brenner.

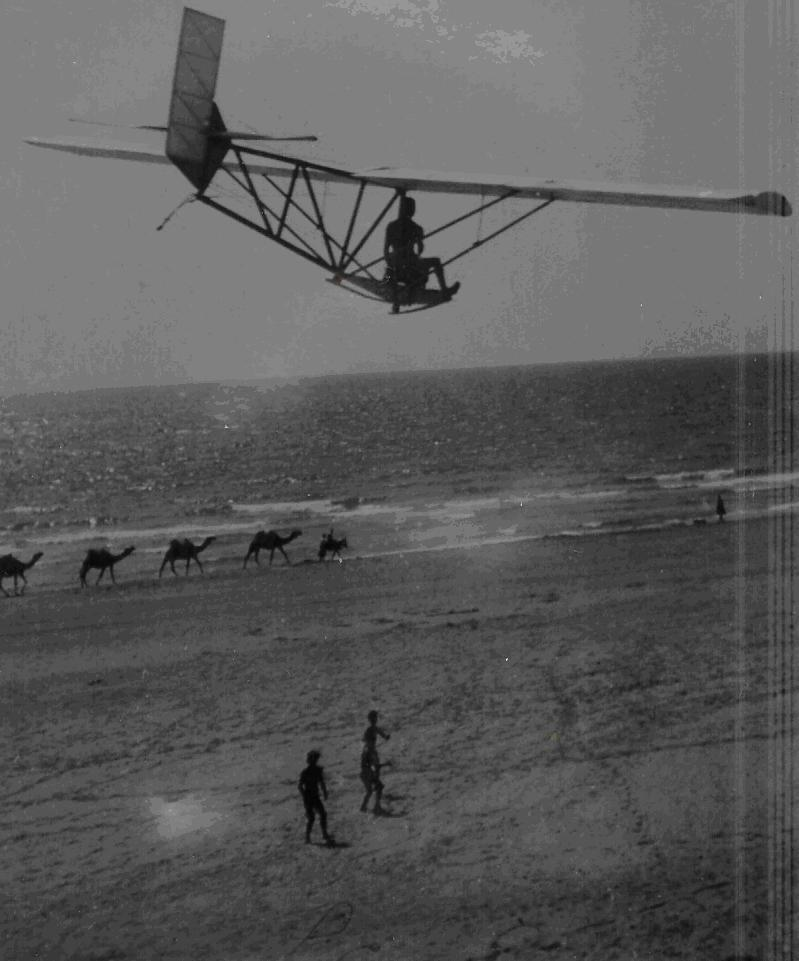
Kahane gliding over Bat Yam beach

The Irgun opened a flying school at Lod airport headed by Moshe Haim Katz. Kahane's pilot's license had the serial number 6. Kahane was the only graduate who kept his license current, leading to his becoming a pilot in the Israeli Air Force later on.

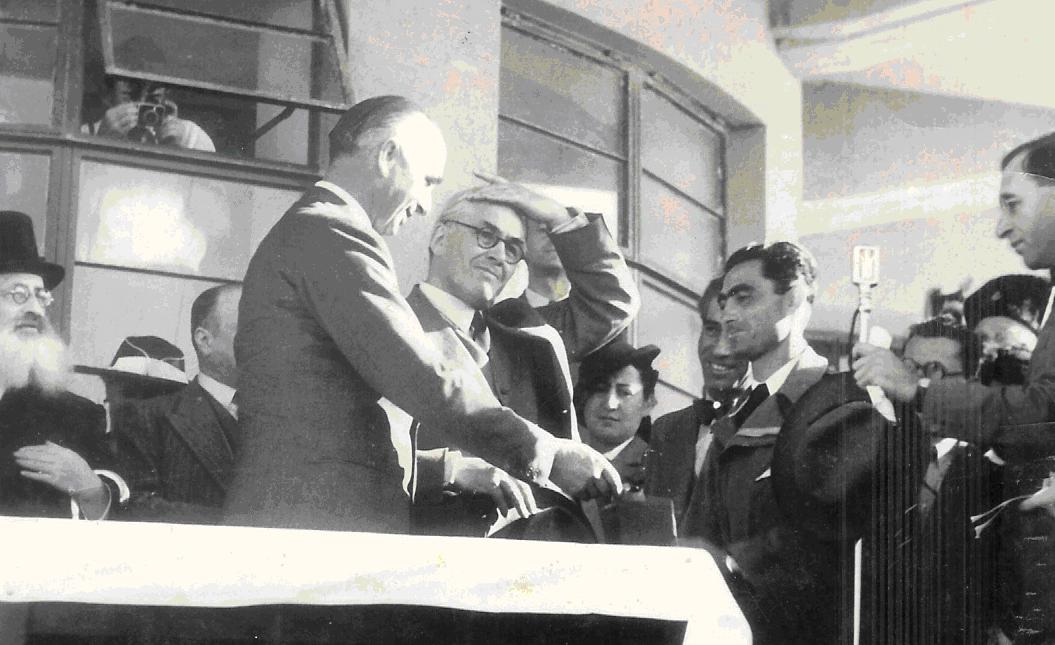
Kahane getting his pilot's license on April 21, 1939

Betar estimated that there were two thousand Jewish pilots around the world who could form the basis of a network of clubs and pilots who could be recruited for action when needed. To that effect, the Pilots Club Tel Aviv was established, and an RWD-15 single engine plane was purchased in Poland, using contributions from the Jewish community. On August 20, 1939, three pilots (Abraham Schechterman, Yitzhak Barash and Kahane) were sent to Poland to bring the plane to Israel. World War II, which broke out only eleven days later, prevented their arrival in Poland, and the plane was never delivered.

In an attempt to contribute to the war effort against the Nazis, Kahane applied to become a volunteer pilot to the Royal Air Force, but was turned down. Continued efforts by the Irgun to secure a plane finally succeeded. In 1941 a two-seater Czechoslovak Zlin XII was purchased in Egypt with funds from a prominent local Jew. Kahane was sent to Egypt to fly the plane from Cairo to Lod.

Chronic lack of resources made it impossible to keep the plane operational, so it was placed in makeshift storage in a Tel-Aviv basement. Abraham Schechterman was recruited to manage the potassium factories in Sodom in 1943. His condition for accepting the position was that an air link to the factory had to be established: an airstrip was to be built, the plane was to be taken out of storage and based at the factory with a pilot. Management finally relented, and Kahane was appointed the company pilot.

Schechterman writes in his memoirs:

The airport was beneficial in light of the many floods that take place in the area regularly. Most importantly, the air link saved the plant from surrendering during the 1948 Arab–Israeli War directly causing the factory to remain inside the Israeli border. Thanks to the airport Sodom could receive supplies and equipment that kept it going. The only connection to the outside world was via air, that allowed not only to hold Sodom, but also to expand beyond it to Ein Gedi to its north and Eilat to its south.

=== Israeli Air Force ===
As a former member of the Irgun, it was not easy for Kahane to be accepted in the newly formed Israeli Air Force as a pilot. However, after repeated efforts, he was allowed to enlist on April 5, 1948, and was attached to Squadron A. His requests for assignment to fighter planes were turned down (perhaps due to his age, 37), but in 1949 he was allowed to train flying dual-engine airplanes. From the second half of 1948 Kahane was attached to Squadron 35, based at Ekron, where he flew the UC-64A Norseman, with sorties also to the besieged Sodom, thus completing a personal circle. In January 1949 Kahane was assigned to a light aircraft squadron flying Pipers; in June 1950 he completed instructor training, and was appointed a Piper flight instructor.

He was at odds with the rest of the squadron both because of his background with the Irgun and his age. Kahane was excluded from some activities, for example, Operation Shnunit in June 1954 (rescue of the crew and commandos off a stranded Israeli Navy near the Saudi coast). Perhaps as a result, he was never promoted beyond the rank of Seren (captain). This was reflected in letters he wrote to his friend Zvi ("Gammy") Rin, also a former Irgun member, who in 1950 left Israel to study in the United States.

In March 1956 the Kahane family moved to Eilat, and Kahane became the liaison pilot of the regional headquarters.

During the second day of the Suez Campaign, on October 30, 1956, several attacks on the IDF's ground forces by pairs of Egyptian MiG-15 were reported. The first two targeted forces at Temed and the Mitla Pass, and at 10:00 a third pair attempted to attack an Israeli column advancing toward Kuntila. What happened next is described in the citation of the Medal of Courage Kahane received posthumously for his heroism:

Part of Operation Kadesh, during hostilities in the Sinai, Capt. Binyamin Kahane served as a liaison pilot with the task of maintaining communications link with a reconnaissance patrol operating 12km ahead of its main force that was advancing to the Kuntila police camp. While discharging his duties, Kahane identified two enemy MiG-15 jet fighters. He intentionally drew their attention, and engaged in an aerial cat and mouse dogfight with them that lasted 15 minutes. One enemy plane had to leave the scene becoming short of fuel, while the other finally hit Captain Kahane’s Piper and shot it down just before departing. With this brave action Kahane distracted the pair of enemy planes and prevented them from fulfilling their task.
