= Bat Yam Seafront =

Coastal strip in Israel

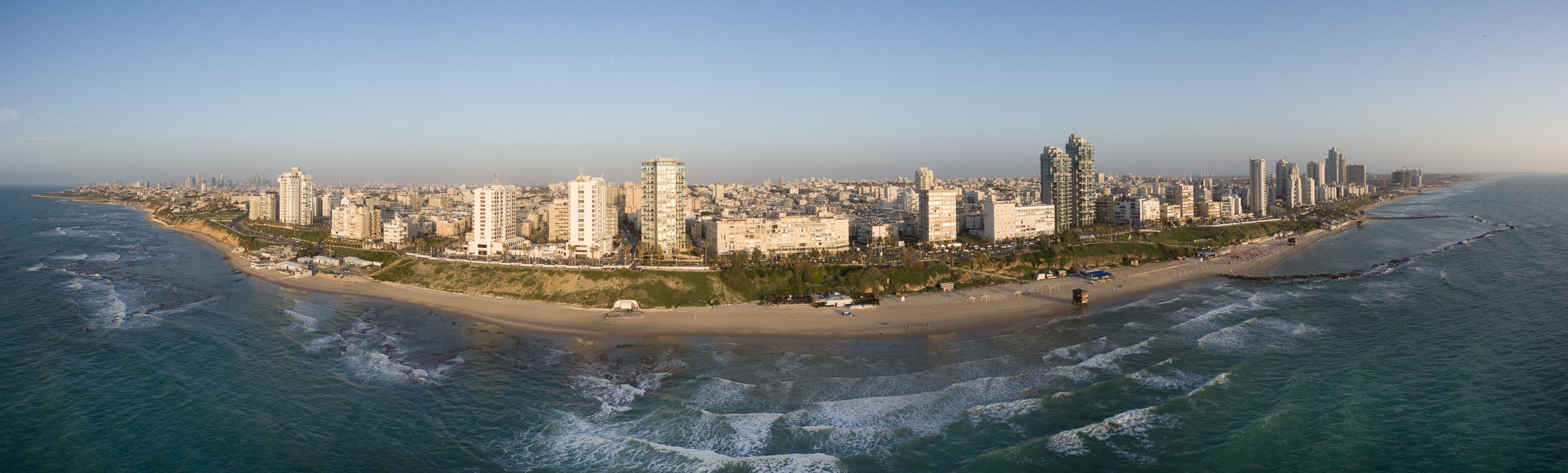
Panoramic view of Bat Yam Seafront

Bat Yam Seafront (Hebrew: רצועת חוף בת ים), or the Bat Yam-coastline is a prominent urban beachfront along the Mediterranean Sea, located in the city of Bat Yam, south of Tel Aviv and north of Rishon LeZion. Stretching approximately 3 kilometers, the coastline features nine official beaches, each offering a difference character and amenities. The coastline plays a central role in shaping the city's identity as a coastal city. The coastal area was connected to that of Rishon LeZion by a decked promenade in 2018.

== History ==
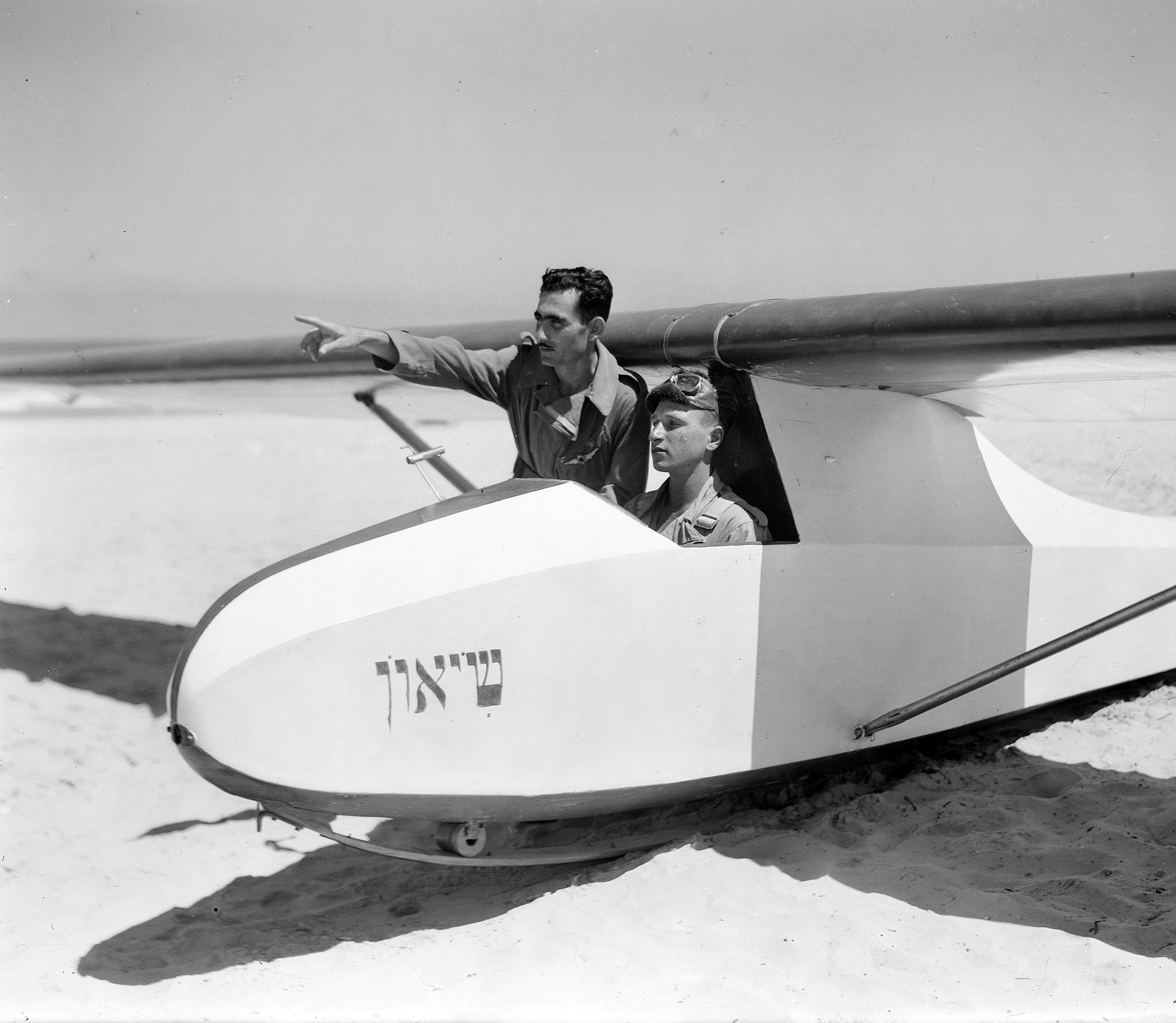
Members of the "Flying Camel" gliding club training on Bat Yam's beach, June 1939

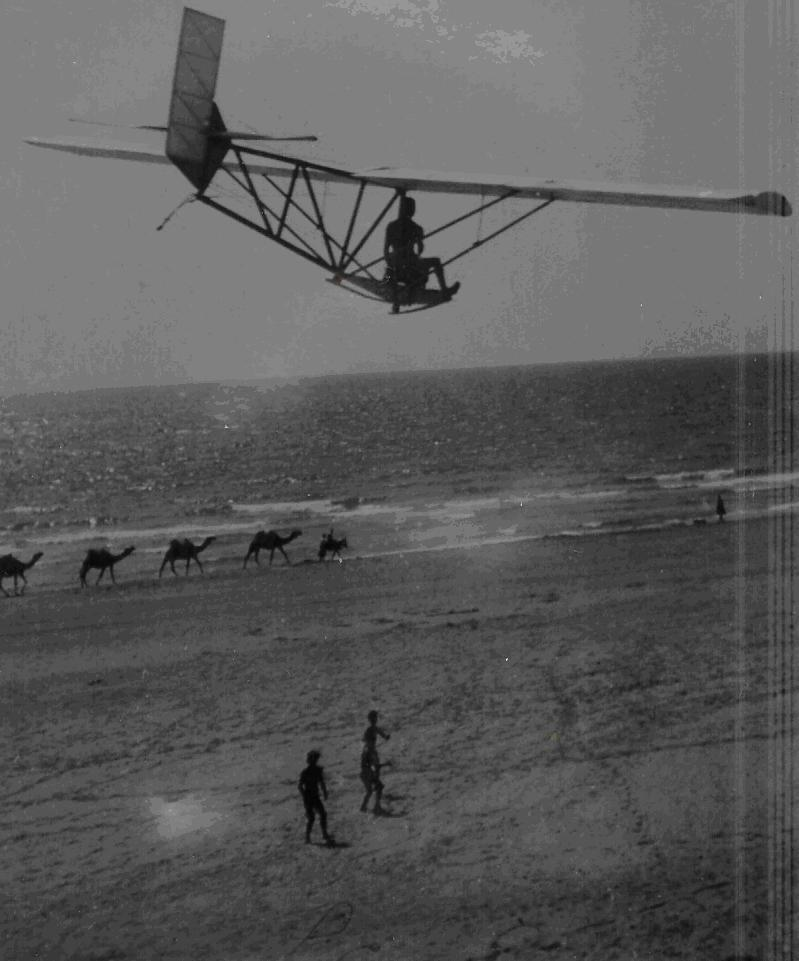
Binyamin Kahane (1911–1956), Israeli Air Force officer and pilot, gliding on Bat Yam Seafront

In its early days, Bat Yam was founded by immigrants from Germany and was called "Beit Vagan" ("House and Garden"). The founders did not attach particular significance to the nearby sea, and the city began to develop according to the European garden city model, turning its back to the sea. Occasionally, gliding exercises of the Hebrew club "The Flying Camel" were held on the beach.

In May 1937, the occupation council of the Bat Yam beach settlement decided to change the name to Bat Yam (Daughter of the Sea), following a proposal by writer Aharon Ze'ev Ben-Yishai. The name reflected the beauty of nature and the geographical character of the settlement, located near the Mediterranean Sea. After the state's establishment, emphasis was placed on this natural resource, and Bat Yam was intended to become the "Riviera" of Israel.

In May 1951, the "Bat Yam Beach Company" was incorporated, later called the "Bat Yam Beach Company for Entrepreneurship and Development Ltd." The company was responsible for developing the coastal strip of the city of Bat Yam, including the construction of hotels, bathhouses, promenades and sailing clubs. In its early days, the company fenced off the beach, and bathers who crossed it on weekends to swim in the sea were arrested by police. The fence was built without a license or approval from the authorized institutions, according to Yitzhak Bar, the secretary of the District Planning and Building Committee. Eventually, the court, in a ruling by Judge Yosef-Michael Lamm, denied the fence's legality and ordered free access to visitors of the nearby café.

During 1956, about two million people swam at the city's beaches. In 2020, Mayor Tzvika Brot restricted access to the beaches following the COVID-19 outbreak. The ban was met with disappointment among residents. Later, Brot announced that entry would be permitted only to city residents. This was mainly due to overcrowding by visitors from Haredi cities severely affected by the pandemic, which were classified as red according to the Traffic Light Model. Minister of the Interior and Shas chairman Aryeh Deri opposed the move, and the Interior Ministry demanded that the Bat Yam municipality present a legal basis to prevent illegal discrimination. In response, Brot decided to close the beaches entirely.

In 2023, Bat Yam's beaches were closed again, following Home Front Command orders during the Gaza war. This was because warning sirens could not be clearly heard on the beaches, making it unsafe for visitors.

== Beaches ==
=== Adam's Rock Beach ===
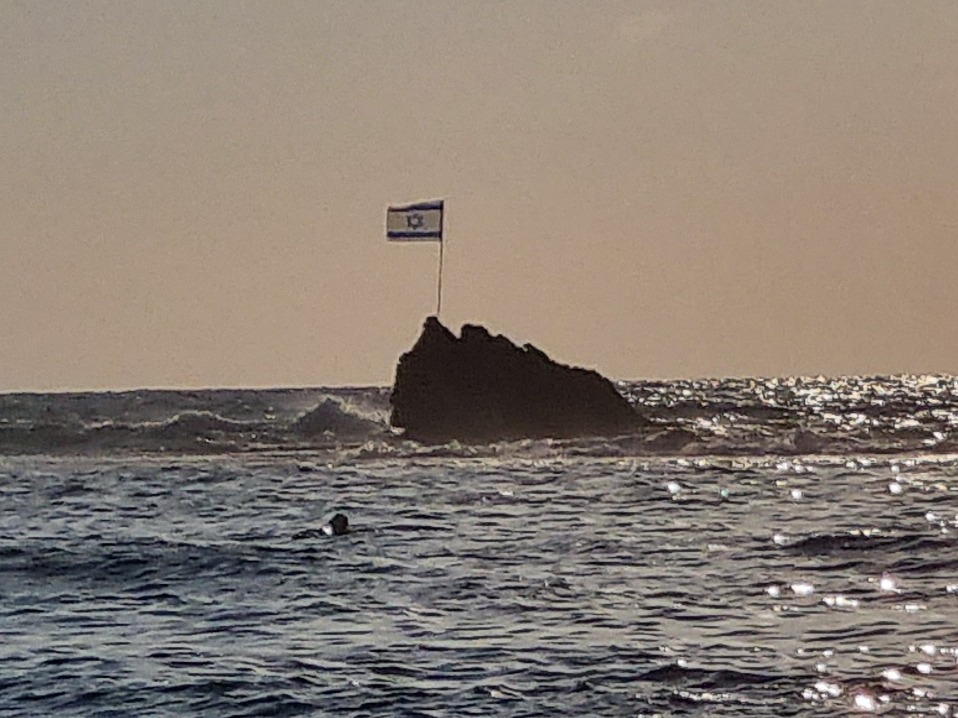
Adam's Rock with the Israeli flag waving

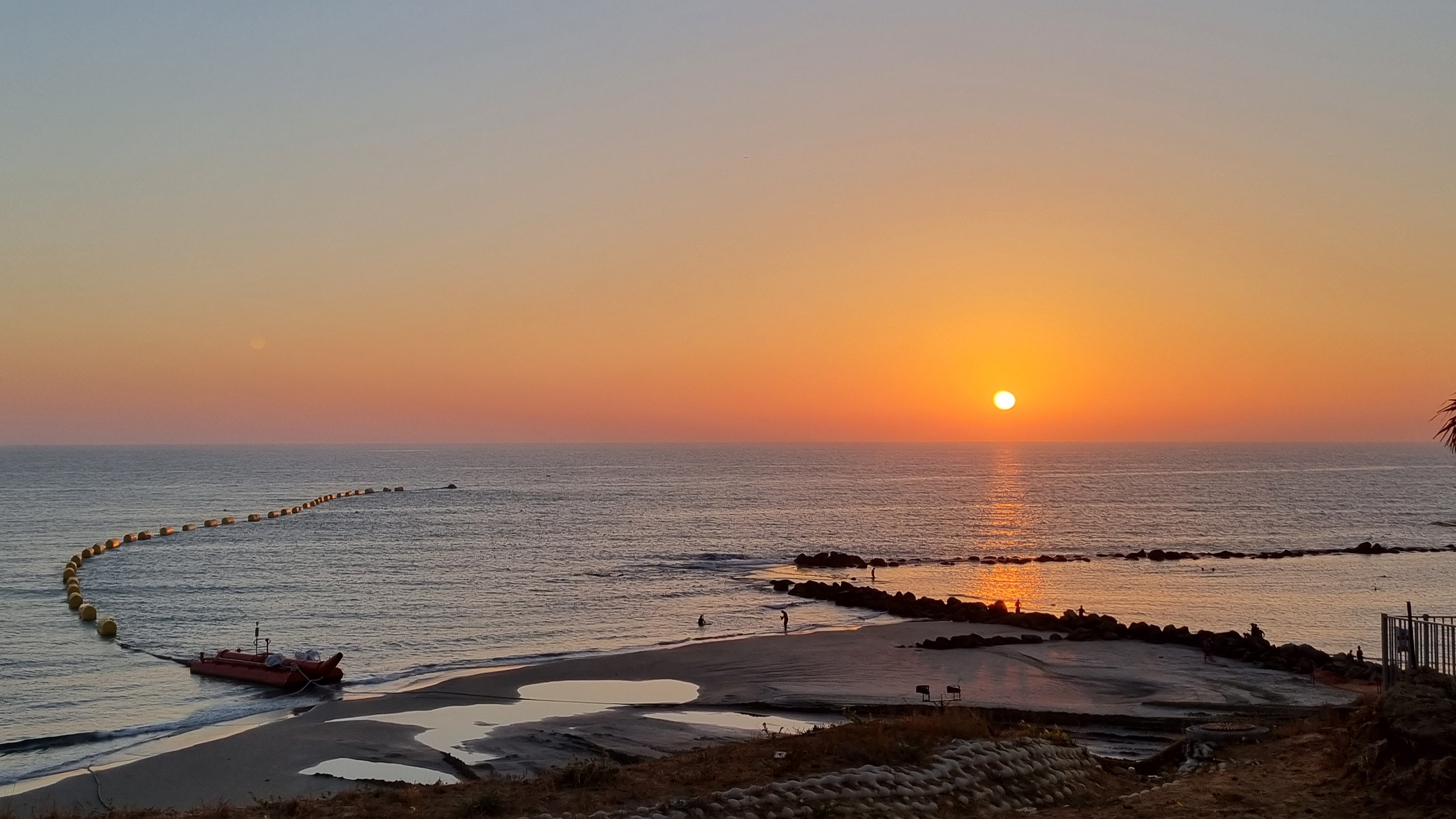
Sand input south of the Rock Beach in 2023

Adam's Rock Beach (Hebrew: חוף הסלע) is named after "Adam's Rock" which juts out from the sea about 150 meters from shore. In the past, the rock could only be reached by swimming or boating, but in the late 1960s a breakwater was built incorporating the rock, making the waters shallower so the rock can now be reached by wading. About ten meters west of the rock is another rock that can be reached by swimming.

It is largest beach in the city, it's considered family-friendly due to the breakwater which creates an artificial lagoon with calm, shallow waters safe for children. The lagoon's creation, along with coastal construction, caused a "sand drift" problem. In 2023, the beach underwent rehabilitation with help from the Government Company for Mediterranean Coastal Cliff Protection, with the ship "Deborah" depositing about 60,000 cubic meters of sand.

=== Sea Palace Beach ===
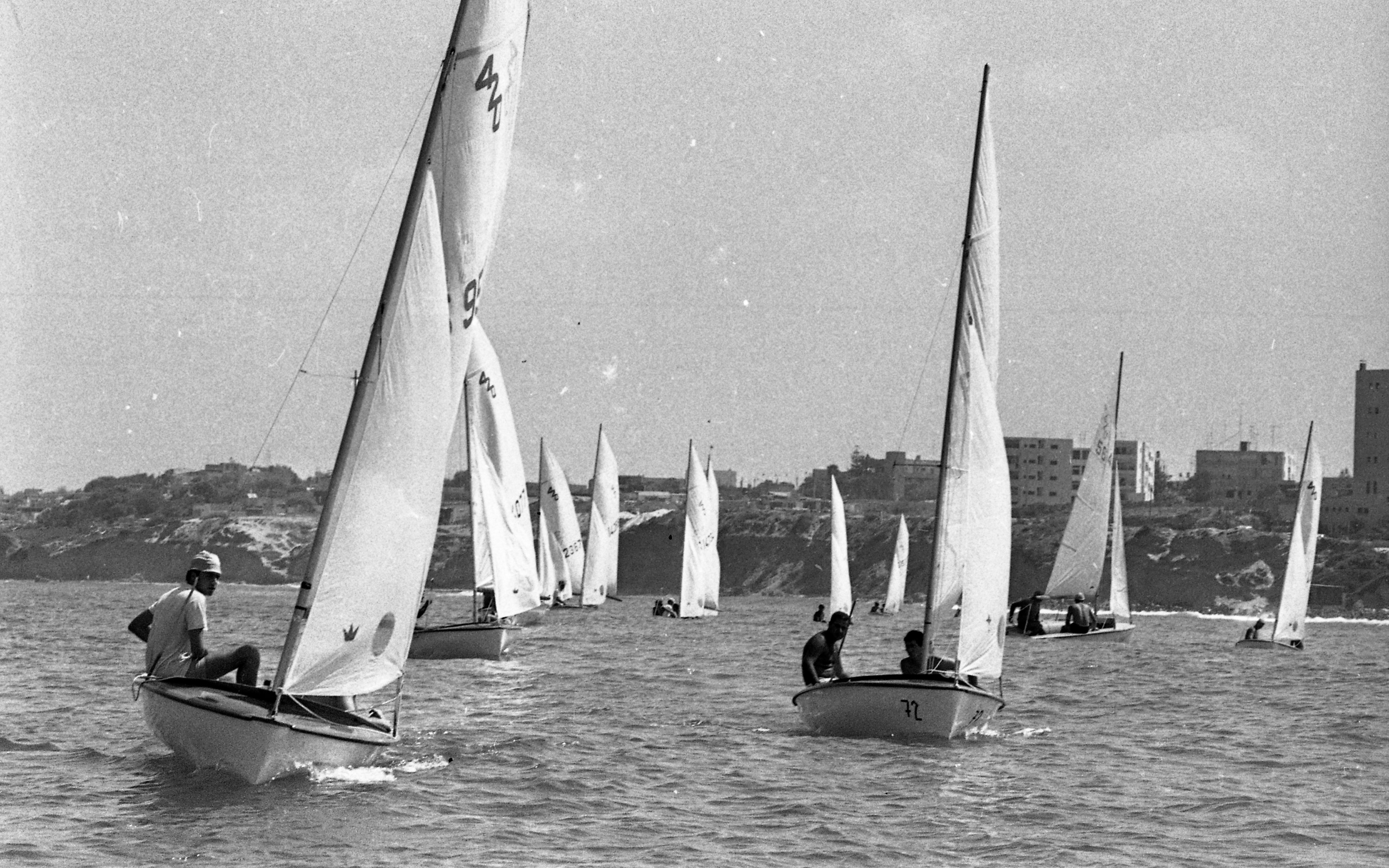
Sailing competition at Sea Palace Beach, 25 August 1969

Sea Palace Beach (Hebrew: חוף סי פאלאס) got its name from British patrons who established a pub and club called "The Palace". The beach serves as a natural lagoon. This made it ideal for sailing clubs since 1952, including "Hapoel Bat Yam", "Maccabi Bat Yam" and "Zvulun Bat Yam". These clubs produced Israel's first world champions when Zefania Carmel and Lydia Lazarov won the 1966 World Sailing Championship in 420 class boats in Sweden. Later champions included Eitan Friedlander, Vered Buskila, Moti Amram, Nir Sela, Amnon Samgura, and twins Adir and Eldar Ezra. Navy Commander Michael Barkai also began his sailing career here, as did notable naval officers like Yaakov Ra'anan, commander of the submarine INS Dakar. The 1963 Israeli Sailing Championship was held at this beach.

At the sailing club entrance stands a sculpture by Yigal Tumarkin, a memorial for a club member who fell in the War of Independence. Tumarkin remarked when receiving the Israel Prize: "I'll place it among the trophies I got from Hapoel Bat Yam for sailing. These are the only things I ever received from state institutions." Another Tumarkin memorial on Bat Yam's promenade honors Moshe "Bushi" Ezra, a sailing club founder.

=== Riviera/ Marina Beach ===
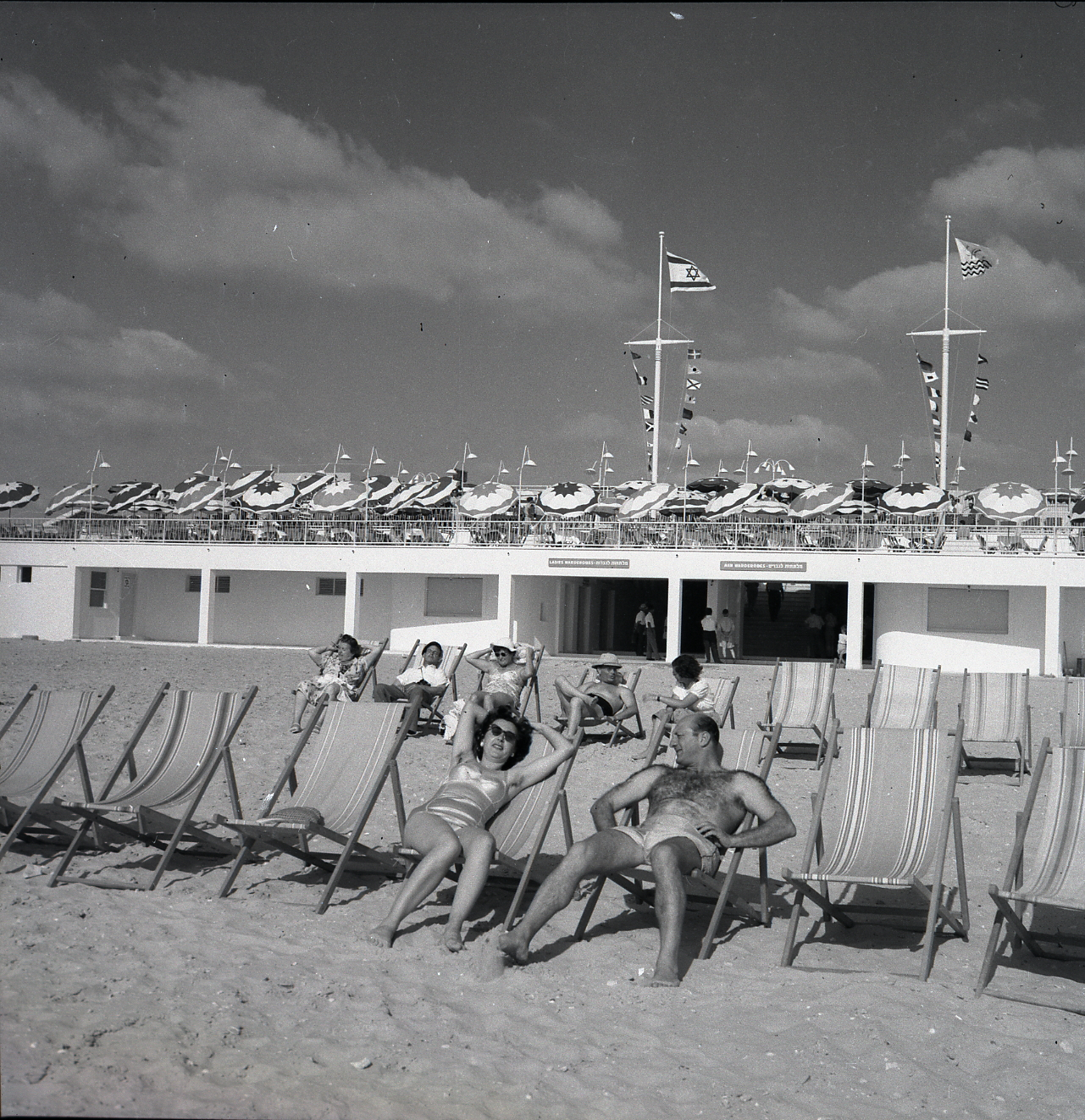
Riviera Beach inauguration

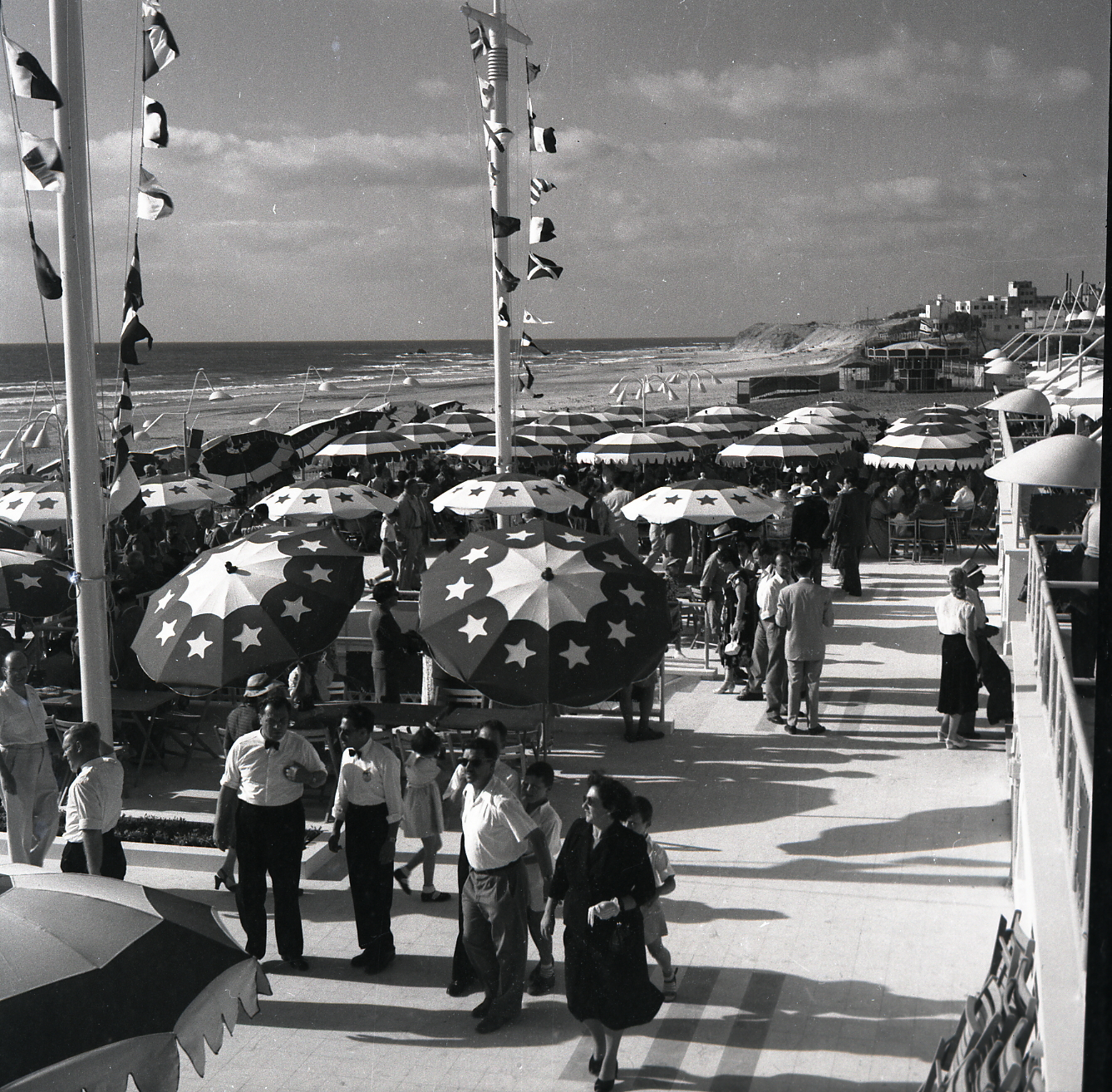
Riviera Beach in early days

Riviera Beach (Hebrew: חוף הריביירה), also known as Marina Beach (Hebrew: חוף המרינה) established around Israel's founding with Interior Minister Yisrael Rokach and local council head David Ben-Ari present. The beach is named after the "Riviera" club from the 1950s that hosted international artists like Aris San and Joseito. Later converted to an art gallery and the 1953 Miss Israel pageant was held here.

My wave (Hebrew: גל שלי) was established on the beach. It is an Israeli non-profit organization that works with unique populations, using surfing as an educational and therapeutic tool. Its first center promotes maritime education for at-risk youth. During the Iron Swords War, the organization opened emergency educational centers on the beach for Israeli evacuees from the Gaza Envelope and the South, and runs programs that support youth and young adults coping with trauma through surfing.

=== Surfers Beach ===
Surfers Beach (Hebrew: חוף הגולשים), named for the many surfers who frequented it in the 1970s-80s. Remains popular with local surfers but also open for swimming. Temporarily hosted the "Pink Beach" spot. However, it closed due to unauthorized migrant activity. The beach had a rare sighting of Mediterranean monk seal "Julia", the only recorded seal in Bat Yam.

=== Jerusalem Beach ===
Jerusalem Beach (Hebrew: חוף ירושלים) also called "Calderon Beach" (Hebrew: חוף קלדרון), is located north of Rock Beach. It is informally named after the long-standing Calderon restaurant that operates at the site. The beach is known for its relatively calm and moderate atmosphere, making it especially popular among local residents.

=== Model Beach ===
Model Beach (Hebrew: חוף לדוגמה) is considered one of the most central and popular beaches in Bat Yam. It features a designated swimming area with lifeguard services, which attracts many visitors.

=== Sunset Beach ===
Sunset Beach (Hebrew: חוף סאנסט), is a designated beach located between Riviera Beach and the separate beach. The beach's future opening was first announced in December 2021, with an initial plan for it to open during the summer of 2022. Following significant delays, extensive renovation, and development work in the surrounding area, the beach was officially inaugurated on 8 August 2024. The beach's development aimed to enhance the city's coastal amenities, offering improved facilities and accessibility for visitors.

=== Separate Beach ===
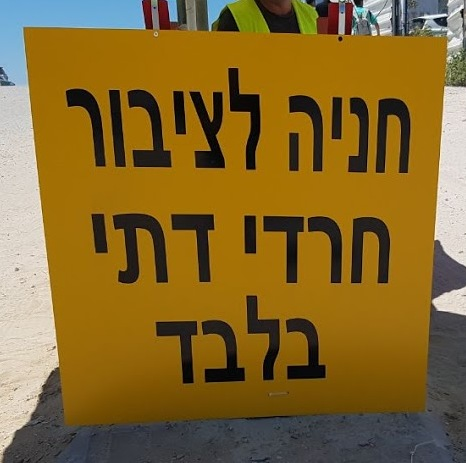
Discriminatory sign at the gender-segregated beach, removed after municipal intervention

The Separate Beach (Hebrew: החוף הנפרד) or Song of the Sea Beach (Hebrew: שירת הים), established in 1959, it is a gender-segregated beach for religious populations, offering separate swimming days for men and women. On Shabbat the beach closes with no lifeguards, allowing mixed swimming. In 2017, the Edah HaChareidis court warned against using such beaches, claiming they "don't maintain modesty standards and encourage licentiousness". In 2018, a sign banning non-religious visitors was removed after public outcry.

=== Taiyo Beach ===
Taiyo Beach (Hebrew: חוף תאיו) is Bat Yam's southernmost official beach, near Rishon LeZion. Features a water sports club and chef restaurant.

=== Palm Beach ===
Palm Beach (Hebrew: חוף הדקלים) it is South of the segregated beach and north of Taiyo Beach, named for its palm trees. Features a kiosk and beach bar hosting parties and events.

== Promenade ==
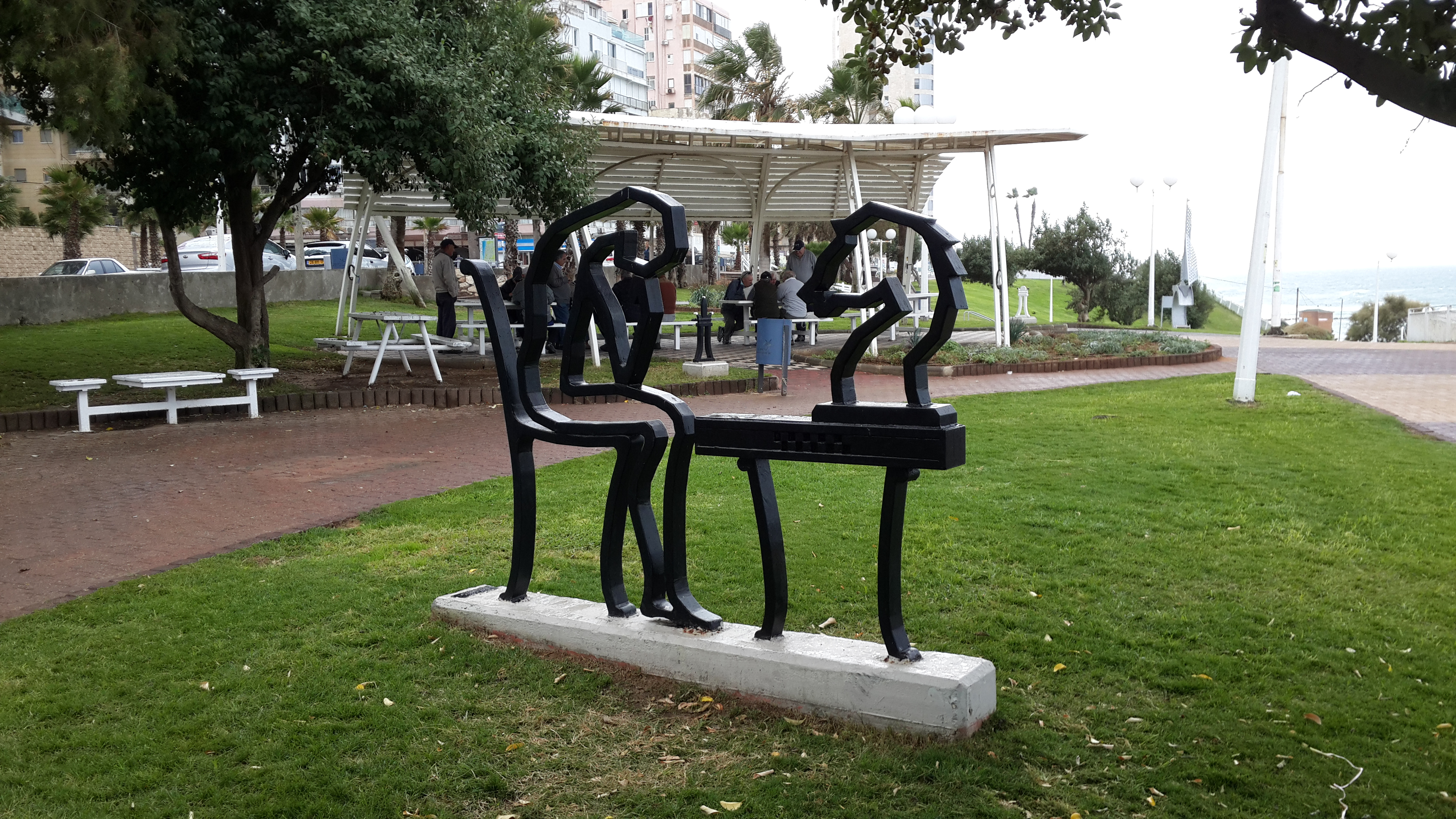
Chess garden on the Bat Yam promenade

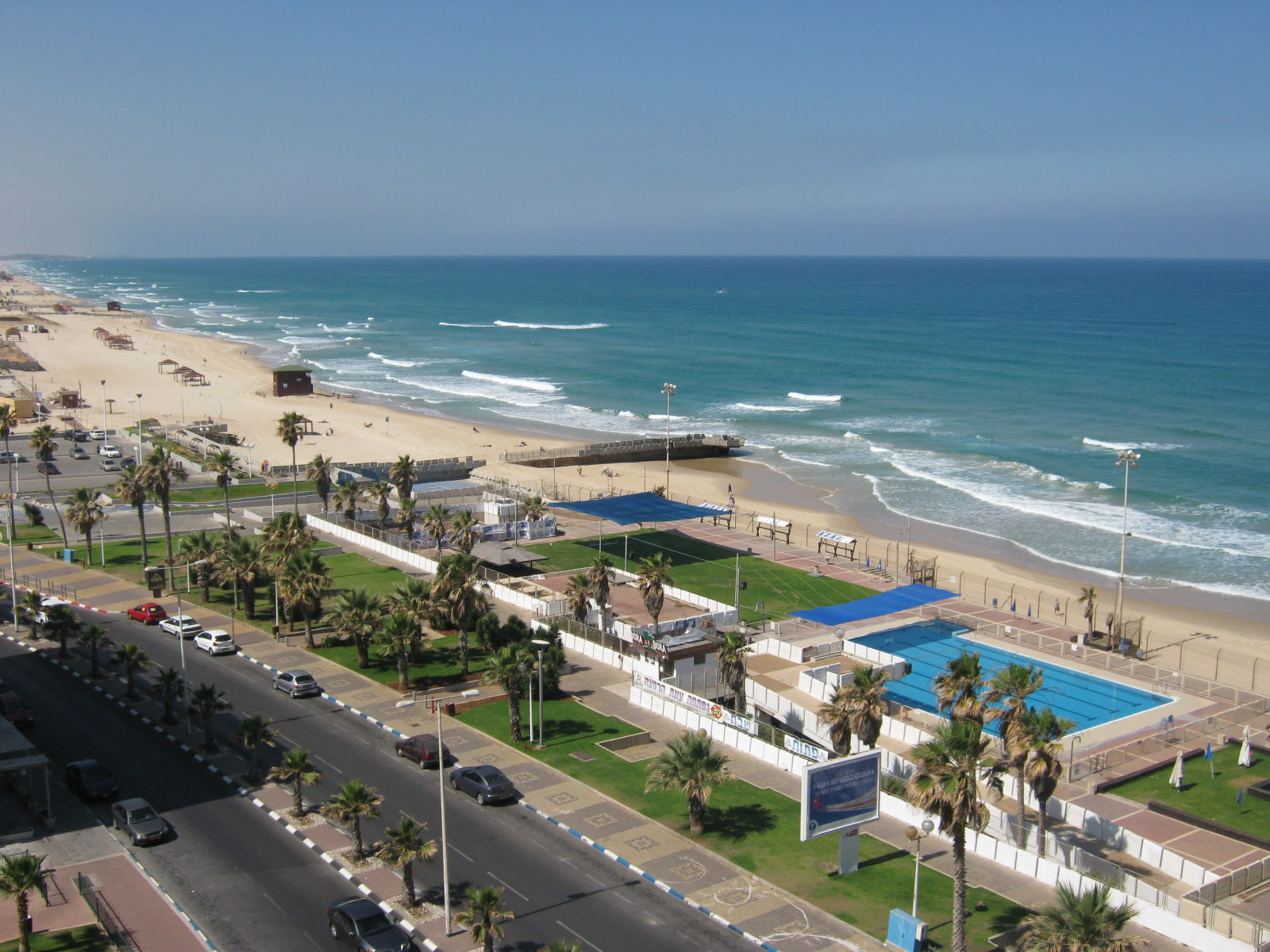
The "Bora Bora" pool on the seafront

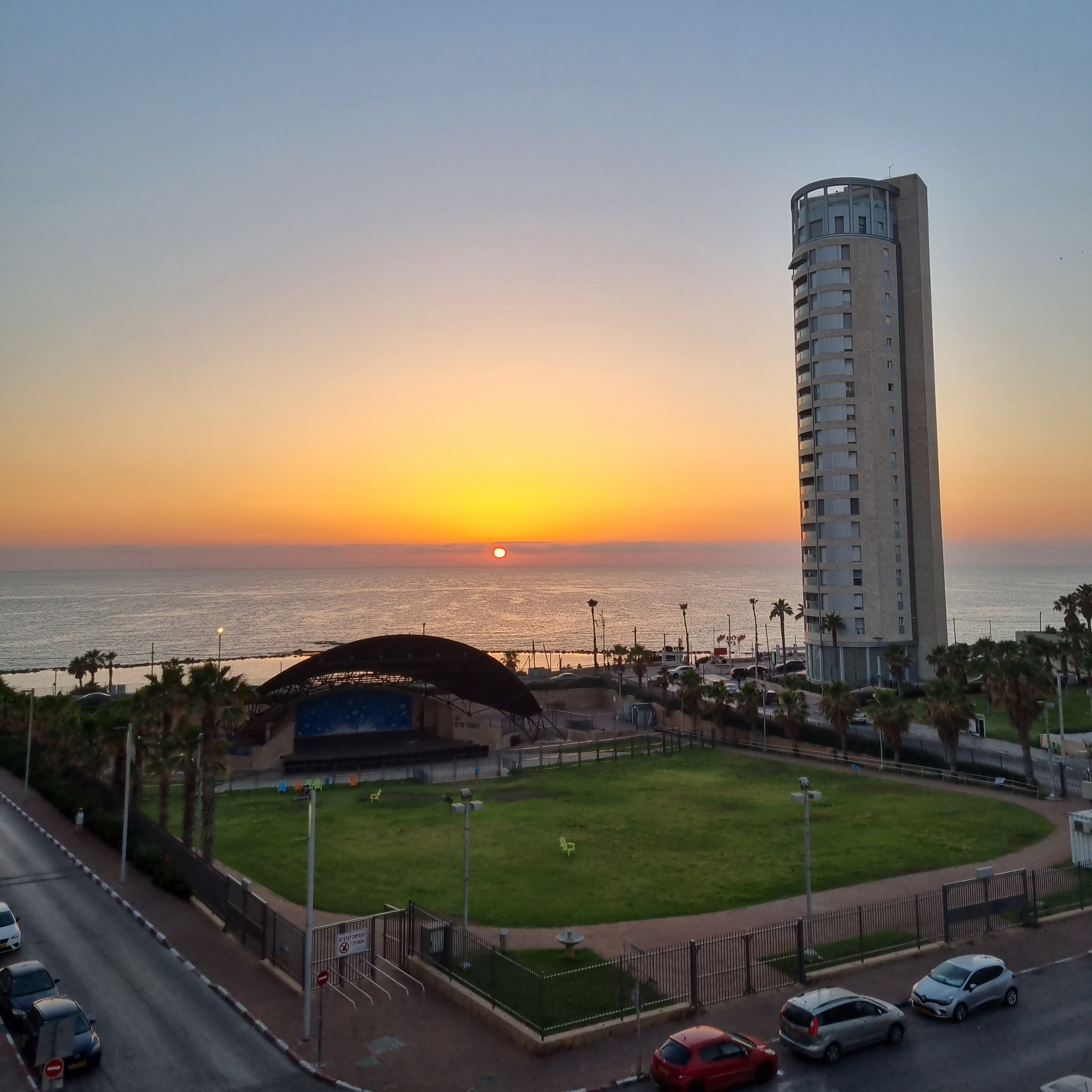
The amphitheater of Bat Yam

In the past, Bat Yam's promenade suffered from neglect and had a problematic reputation. Since then, it has undergone major urban renewal and extensive landscaping. The vibrant promenade now features cafés, gardens, lawns, flower beds, and sports facilities. It stretches from Sea Palace Beach in the north (bordering Jaffa) to the Colony Beach Hotel in central Bat Yam, and was later extended southward to connect with Rishon LeZion's promenade.

The promenade is lined with the sloping lawns of Jerusalem Beach. It is near the intersection with Atzma'ut Boulevard stands the city's main cultural venue — the Amphitheater — which hosts concerts, performances, festivals, and other cultural events. It is also provides access to the "Bora Bora" beachfront pool complex (formerly called "Brihof"), which features a semi-Olympic pool, a toddler pool, and a lawn.

== Notable events ==
- In March 1937, during the Arab revolt in Palestine, two people were killed on Bat Yam beach in an Irgun operation.
- In December 2013, a bomb exploded on a bus. The attack was believed to be by Palestinian Islamic Jihad. An evacuation prevented any casualties.

== Gallery ==
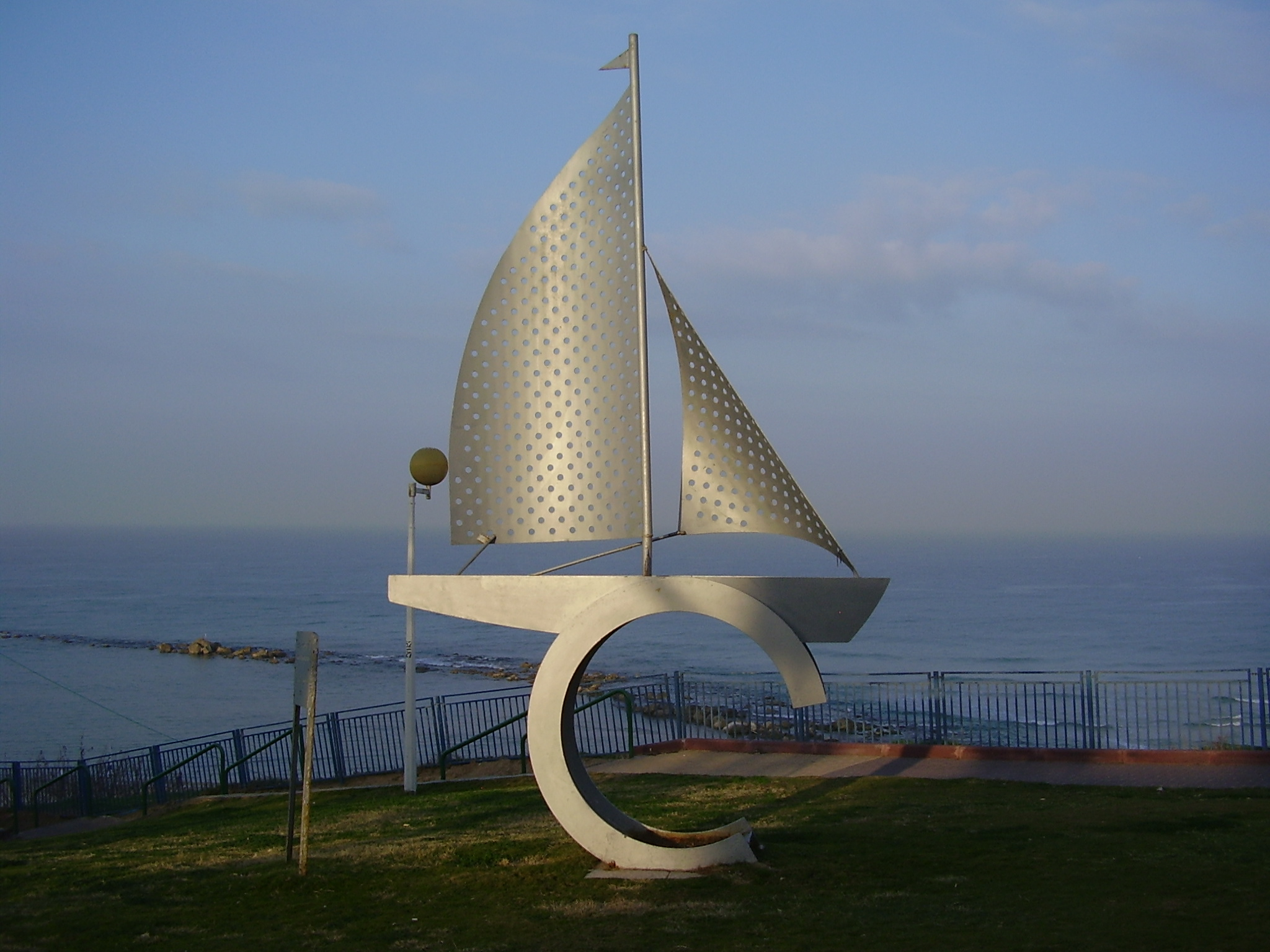
Sculpture of a sailboat by Rachel Timor on the Bat Yam promenade, 1998

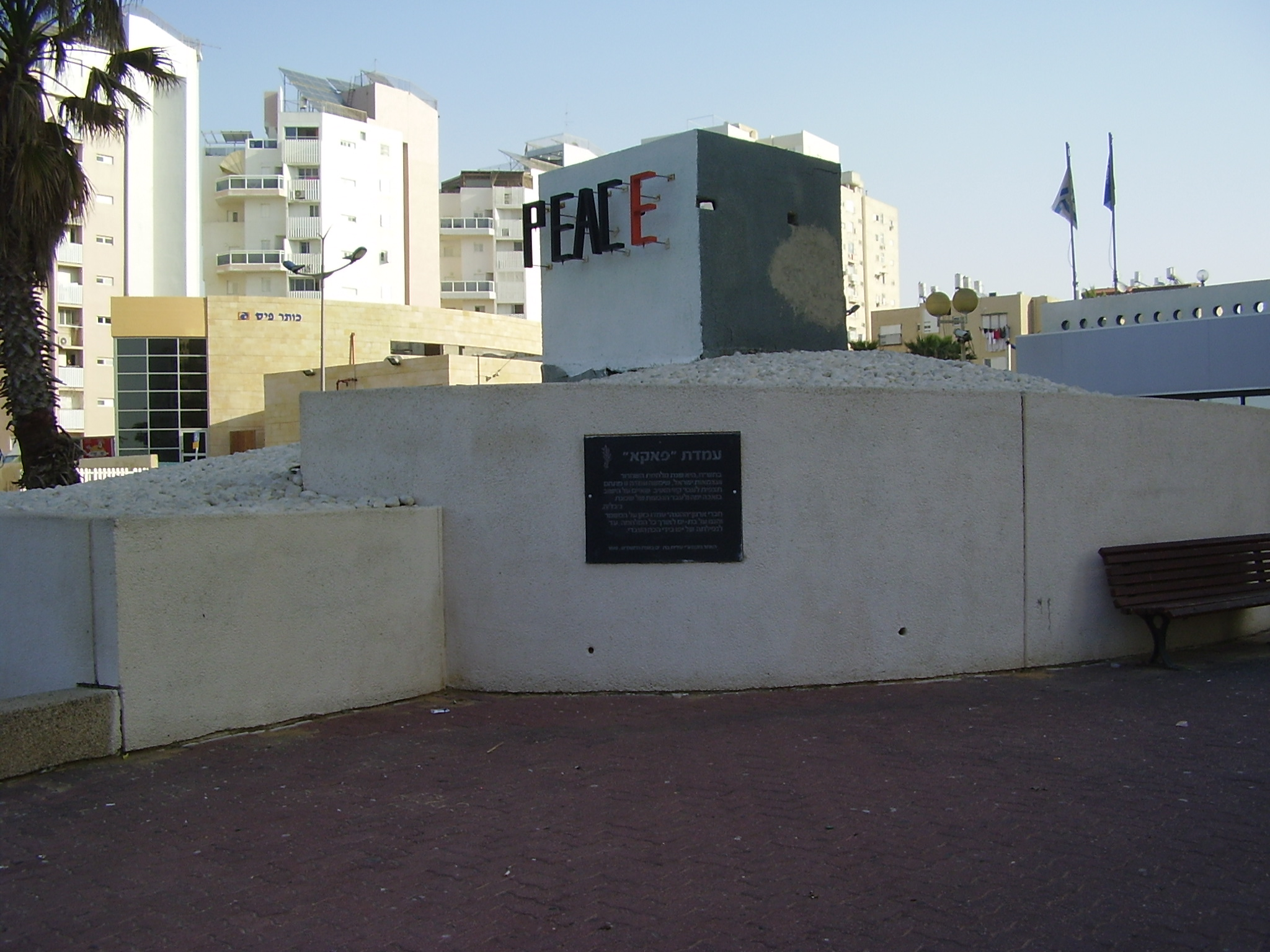
The "Paka" position was a defense position from the War of Independence, named after the nearby "Paka" factory, which produced alcohol, carbonic acid, and baking yeast.

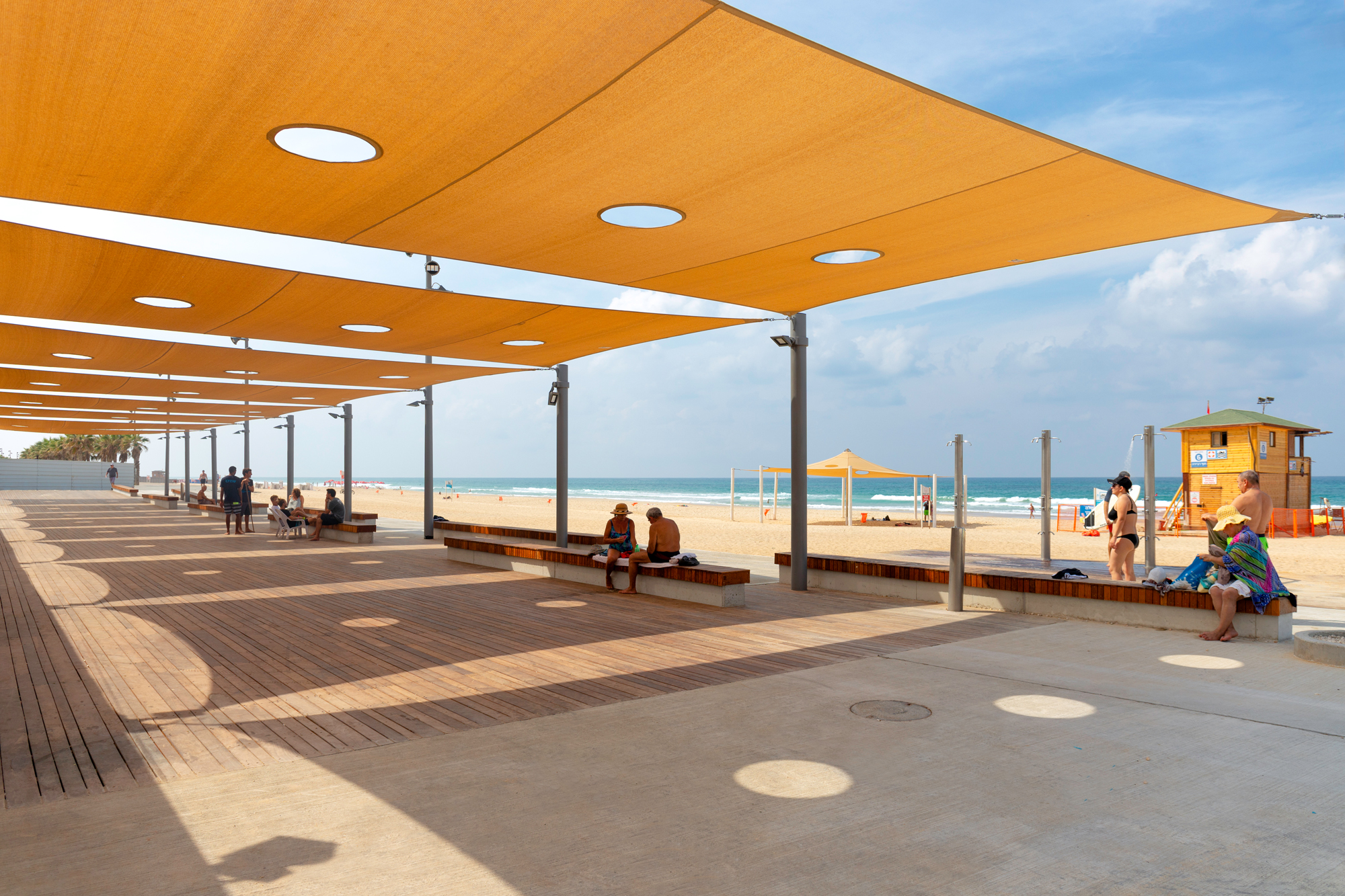
Cabanas on the Riviera Beach

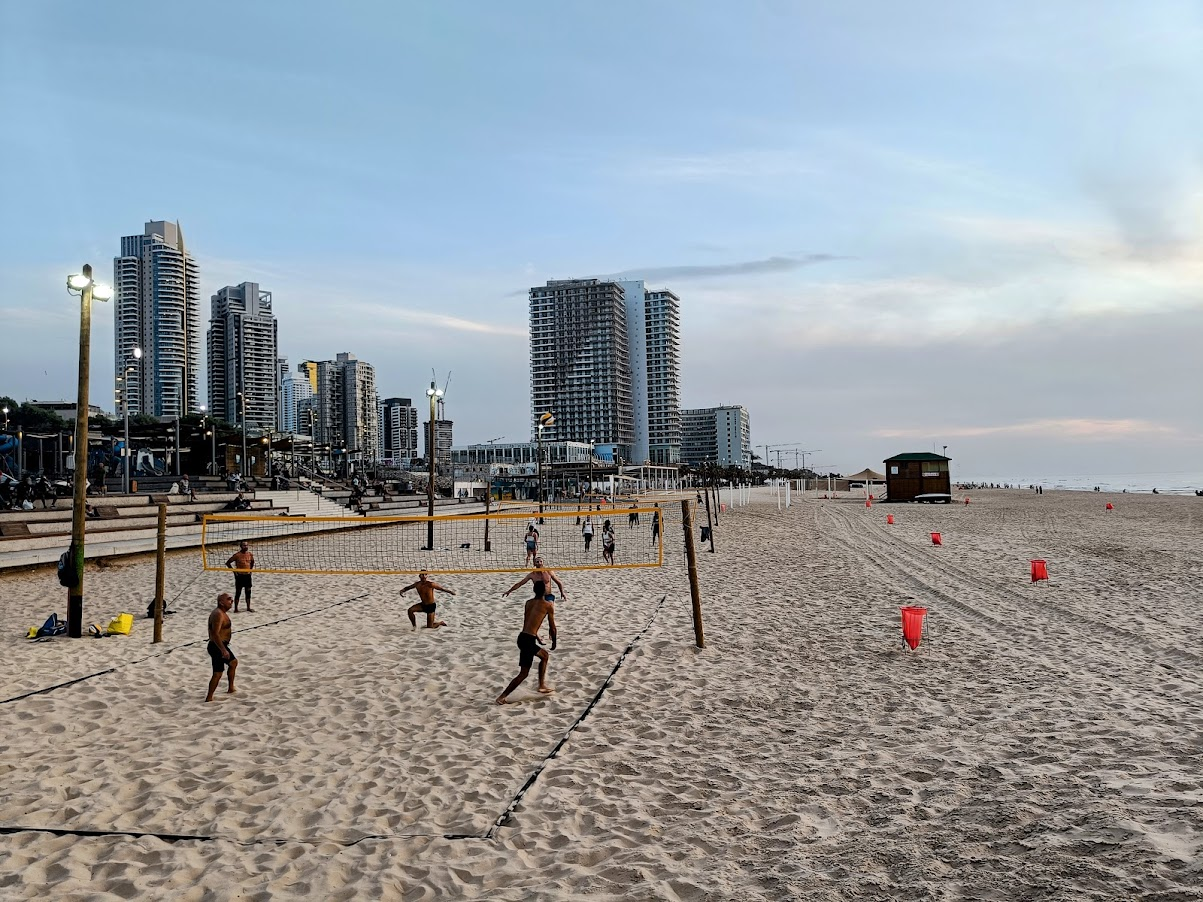
Beach volleyball game on the Riviera Beach, November 2021

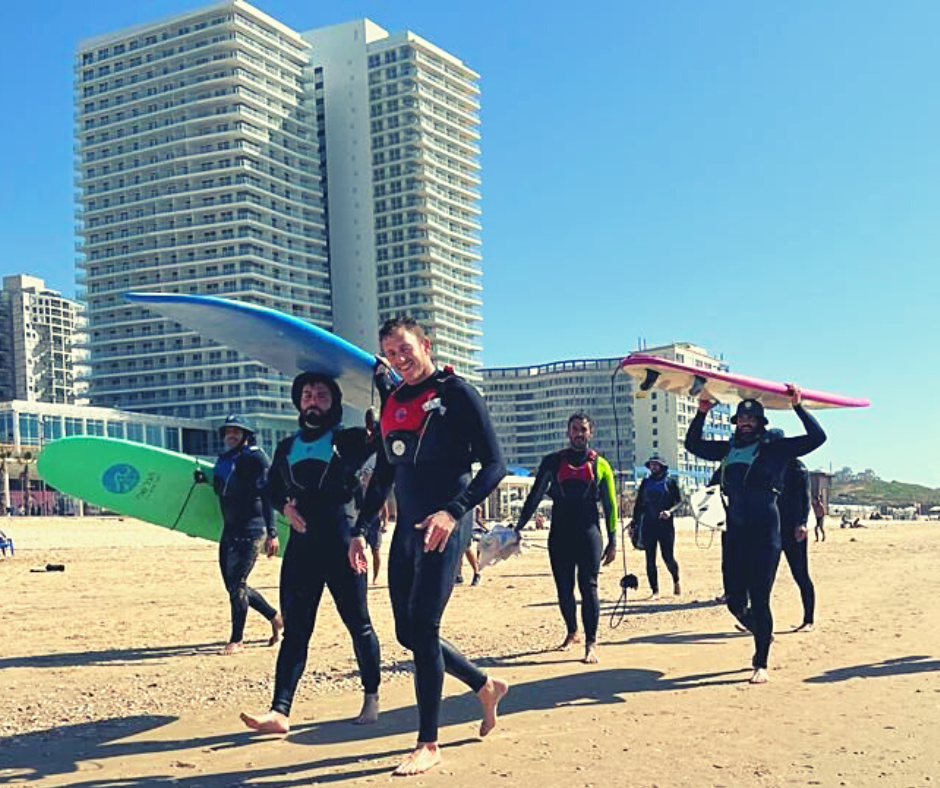
My Wave" campers on the Riviera Beach
