= Uri Zohar =

Israeli film director (1935–2022)

- אורי זוהר
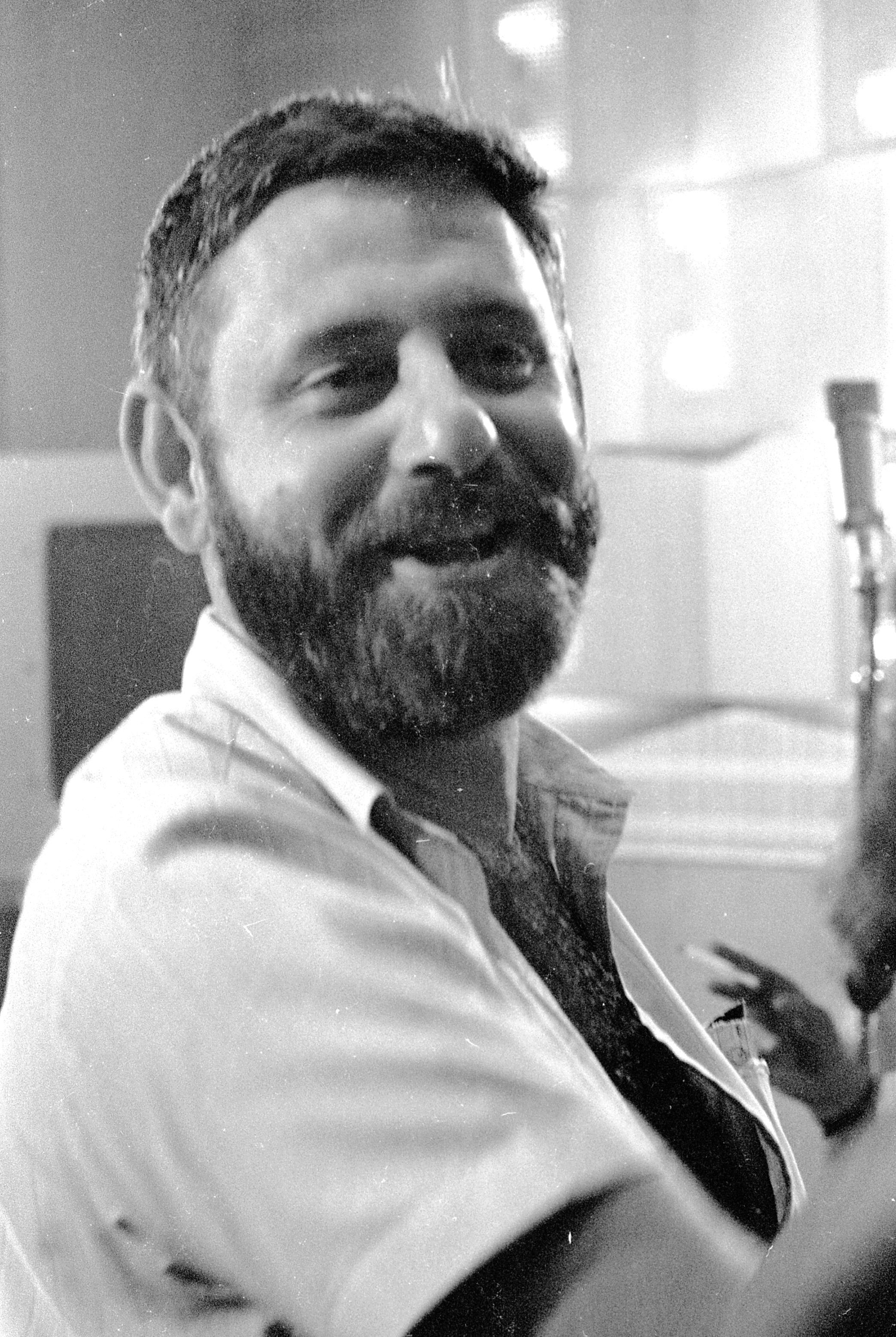
- Zohar in 1969
- Born: 4 November 1935; Tel Aviv, Mandatory Palestine
- Died: 2 June 2022 (aged 86); Jerusalem, Israel
- Education: Hebrew University of Jerusalem
- Occupations: Actor; film director; comedian; rabbi
- Years active: 1956–1988
- Notable work: Hole in the Moon; Three Days and a Child; The Hero
- Spouse(s): Ilana Rovina (divorced) Elia Shuster (until 2022)

Uri Zohar (Hebrew: אורי זוהר [ˈuʁi ˈzoaʁ]; 4 November 1935 – 2 June 2022) was an Israeli film director, actor, comedian and rabbi. A major figure of the Israeli New Sensibility movement in Israeli cinema, he became one of the country's most prolific and prominent filmmakers in the 1960s and 1970s. He was named a recipient of the Israel Prize for Cinema in 1976, but he declined to accept the award.

Zohar was born and raised in Tel Aviv. He moved to Jerusalem and studied philosophy at university. As a filmmaker, he rose to prominence with his first full-length feature Hole in the Moon (1964). Three Days and a Child (1967) was nominated for the Grand Prix du Festival International du Film at the 1967 Cannes Film Festival.

His drama, Every Bastard a King (1968) was a major box office success. He later directed his Tel Aviv Trilogy, with the critically acclaimed Metzitzim (Peeping Toms) (1972), Big Eyes (1974) and his final mainstream film, Save the Lifeguard (הצילו את המציל, Hatzilu Et HaMatzil, 1977).

In the mid-70s he started to become religious, eventually emerging as one of Israel's most prominent Baal teshuva figures. He eschewed his entertainment career by 1978 and became a Haredi rabbi.

== Early life and education ==
Uri Zohar was born in Tel Aviv. His parents were Polish Jewish immigrants. In 1952, he graduated high school and did his military service in an army entertainment troupe. His first marriage, to singer Ilana Rovina, ended in divorce.

In 1960, he studied philosophy at the Hebrew University of Jerusalem. He was sentenced to three months of community service on charges of marijuana possession. In the late 1970s, under the influence of Yitzhak Shlomo Zilberman, Zohar turned to religion, becoming a Haredi Orthodox Jew and a rabbi.

Zohar was one of the founding members of Ma'ale Amos. Later, he resided in Jerusalem.

== Career ==
=== 1957-1962: Early roles, theatre and directorial debut ===
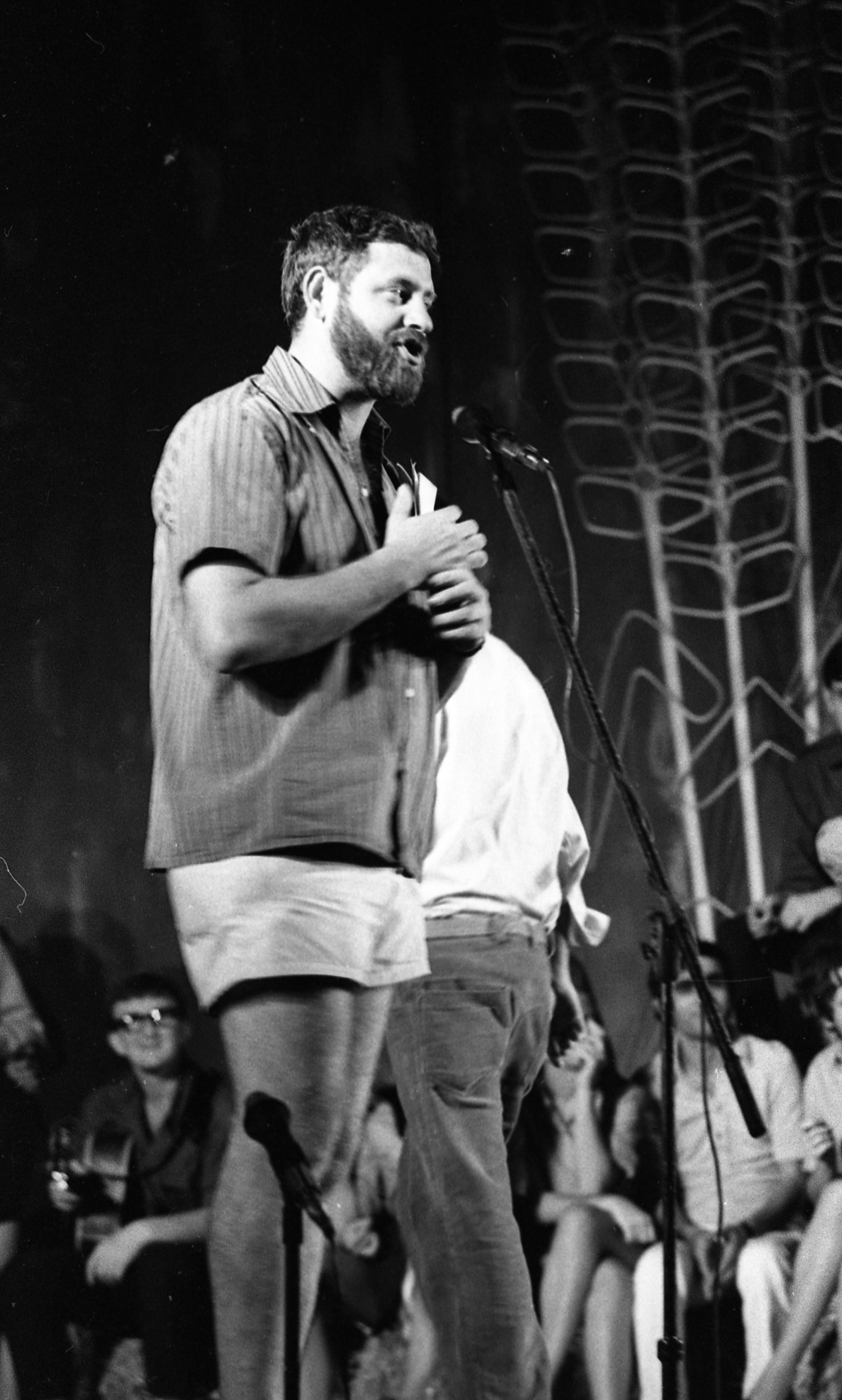
Zohar at the 20th anniversary of the Nahal Brigade (1969)

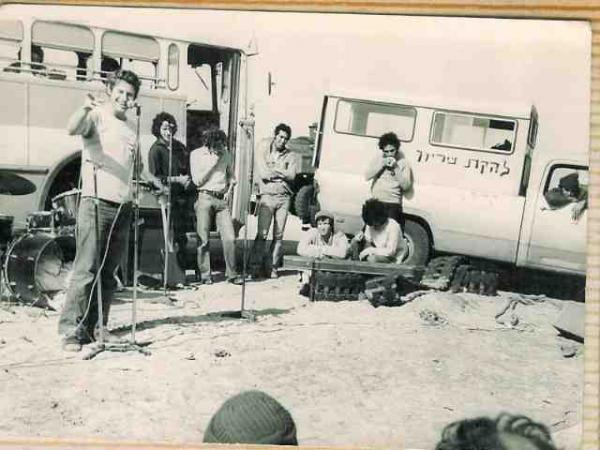
Uri Zohar at the microphone, performing with the Lool group for soldiers during the Yom Kippur War (1973)

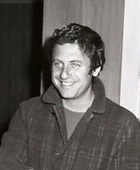
Uri Zohar in They Call Me Shmil (1973)

After his discharge from the army, Zohar became one of the founding members of the theatre and entertainment troupe Batzal Yarok, which was popular in the late 1950s and early 1960s.

Asa an actor, he had early film roles in the Larry Frisch picture Pillar of Fire (1959), Raphael Nussbaum's Burning Sands (1960). He also had a minor role in Otto Preminger's Hollywood epic Exodus, about the founding of the State of Israel. He also had a role in Ulai Terdu Sham (Dreamboat) (1964), which is regarded as a pivotal film in Tel Aviv cinema.

In 1962, he co-directed the documentary film The True Story of Palestine (Etz O Palestina) with Nathan Axelrod and Joel Silberg. The film charts the lives of the Yishuv, the Jewish community residing in Palestine prior to the establishment of the State of Israel in 1948.

=== 1963-1977: Breakthrough, acclaim and box office success ===
In 1964, he directed and starred in his first full-length feature film, Hole in the Moon. It is considered the first film of the New Sensibility movement in Israeli cinema and is regarded as a classic. It tells the story of new Jewish migrants to the State of Israel, who create an imaginary cinematic city in the Negev desert. It was screened at the 1965 Cannes Film Festival as part of International Critics' Week.

In 1967, he directed Three Days and a Child, a modernist adaptation of a short story of the same name by A. B. Yehoshua. It was nominated for the Grand Prix du Festival International du Film at the 1967 Cannes Film Festival. The film's star, Oded Kotler won the award for Best Actor at the Cannes Film Festival.

This was followed by Every Bastard a King (1968), a critical and commercial hit. It became one of the most successful box office hits in Israeli cinema history. It was seen by an estimated 743,000 people.

In 1971, he co-directed the British-Israeli drama film, Bloomfield (AKA The Hero) with actor Richard Harris. It tells the story of an ageing football player in Tel Aviv who navigates his final match and his love for Nira (Romy Schneider). He also directed episodes of the popular television series "Lool" (Chicken Coop).

In the 1970s, he also embarked on his Tel Aviv Trilogy, with ''Metzitzim (Peeping Toms) (1972) and Big Eyes. In 2022, these films were described by Haaretz film critic Uri Misgav as being "two of the best films ever made in Israel." The final film of the trilogy, Save the Lifeguard (Hatzilu Et HaMatzil) (1977), was his last mainstream film.

When Israel Television went on air, he became a program host and appeared in commercials. In 1977, he began wearing a kippa on the television game show he was hosting.

=== 1978-2022: Religious figure ===
He eventually withdrew entirely from Israel's popular culture scene to become a Haredi Jew and began to study in yeshiva. He became a rabbi in Jerusalem and immersed himself in Biblical scholarship. He became active in the movement to attract secular Jews to religious orthodoxy, and used his entertainment skills to promote this objective.

In 1985, he appeared in Renen Schorr's short film Wedding in Jerusalem, which documents the wedding of Zohar's son Ephraim to Alona, daughter of Arik Einstein.

In the 1992 Israeli elections, Zohar directed the television broadcasts for the Shas party. He later directed a film about a successful dancer who embraces orthodox Judaism, mirroring his own story. The film was a success with Ultra-Orthodox audiences. Zohar had enlisted the help filmmakers Dani Rosenberg and Yaniv Segalovich to make it, and Rosenberg and Segalovich in turn made a documentary about him, Zohar: The Return (2018).

When asked in an interview about how he regarded his former career in entertainment, Zohar said that "I respect it, the way a mature adult remembers his childhood. But there's no escaping the fact that I was a child."

== Awards and recognition ==
In 1976 he was awarded the Israel Prize for cinema, which he declined. In 2012, Cinémathèque Française in Paris held a retrospective of Zohar's work. The event included lectures and screenings of all his major films. Zohar was described as one of Israel's most interesting film directors due to his exploration of manhood and machismo, male-female relationships and the impact of the military.

== Personal life ==
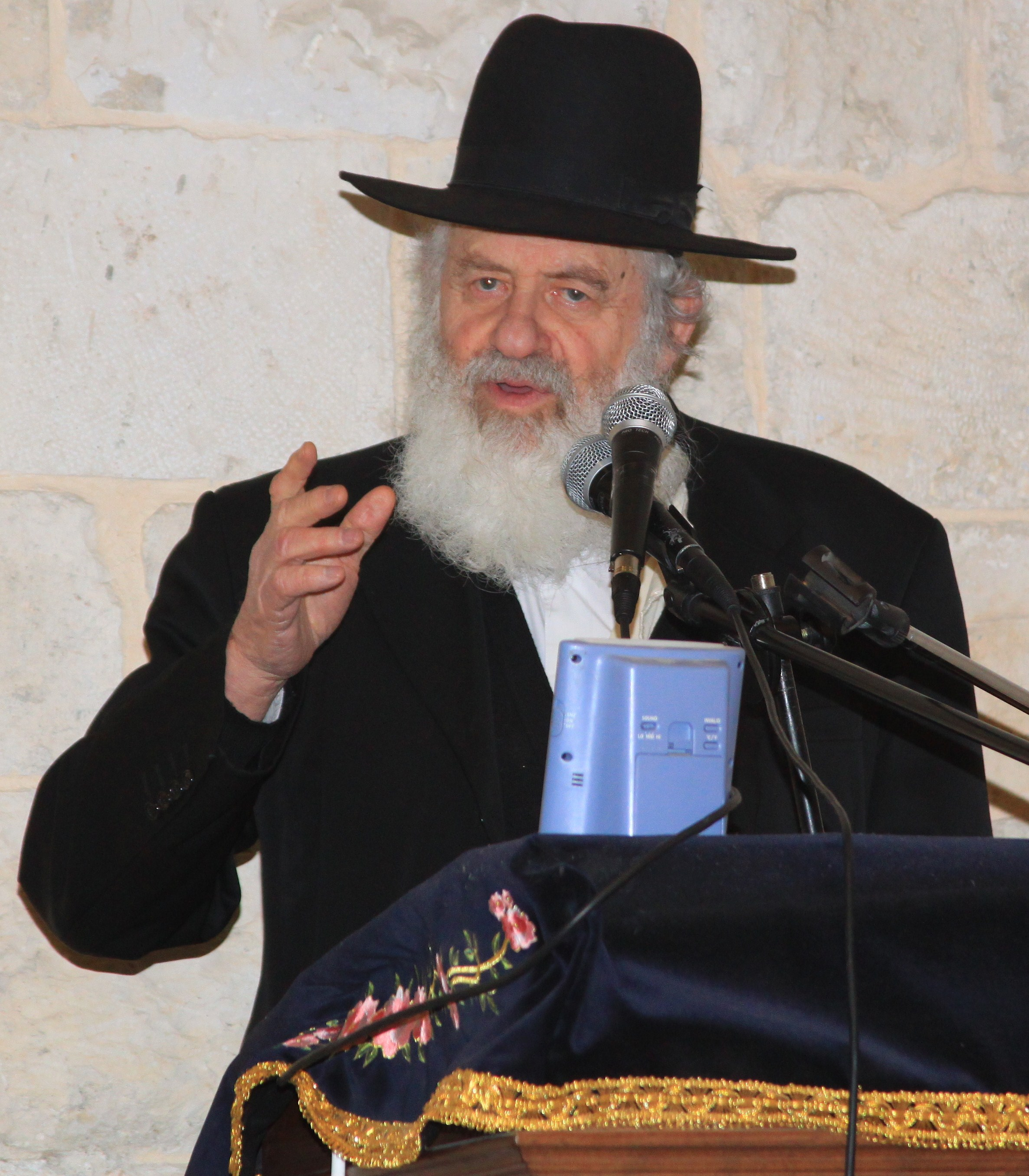
Zohar in 2011

In the early 1960s, Zohar was married to the singer Ilana Rovina for about two years. Later he married Elia Shuster, an actress who starred in the film Big Eyes (1974) that he directed.

Zohar and Alia, who lived in Jaffa after getting married and later became religiously observant and moved to Jerusalem, had seven children.

He was a close friend of Arik Einstein, with whom he made some of his most noted films. Einstein's two daughters, Shiri and Yasmin, married Zohar's sons, Ephraim Fishel and Shalom. The wedding of Ephraim Fishel and Shiri was documented in Renan Shor's 1985 short film "A Wedding in Jerusalem." Another son, Itamar, who became secular, initiated the 2004 three-part series "Looking Inside" - a series in which Itamar examines the two worlds his father lived in, and they debate matters of faith, values and reconciliation between secular and ultra-Orthodox Jews. After several years Itamar returned to religious observance. The series was filmed in their Jerusalem home, as well as locations where Zohar lived and worked in Tel Aviv. Another son, Betzalel, managed the Migdal Or institutions of Rabbi Yitzhak David Grossman. The youngest son, David, is a Jerusalem city council member representing the United Torah Judaism party. Zohar's only daughter, Ahinoam, is the subject of the song "Ahinoam Doesn't Know," which appeared on Erik Einstein's album "Pozy."

=== Death ===
Rabbi Uri Zohar died on June 2, 2022, at the age of 86, after suffering a heart attack at his home in Jerusalem's Romema neighborhood. The funeral procession left from the home he lived in, accompanied by many mourners. He was buried in Har HaMenuchot cemetery on Mount Herzl in Jerusalem. He was survived by his second wife Eliya Shuster, a former actress, and their seven children and numerous grandchildren.

== Filmography ==
=== Film ===
Year	Title				
Year	Title	Director	Writer	Producer	Notes
1962	The True Story of Palestine	Yes	No	No	Co-directed with Nathan Axelrod and Joel Silberg; Written by Haim Hefer
1964	Hole in the Moon	Yes	No	No	Written by Amos Kenan
1966	Moishe Air-Condition	Yes	No	No	Written by Alex Maimon
1967	Three Days and a Child	Yes	Yes	No	Co-written with Dahn Ben Amotz and Amatsia Hiuni
1968	Every Bastard a King	Yes	No	No	Co-written with Eli Tavor
1968	Fish, Football and Girls	Yes	No	No	Co-written by Talila Ben-Zakai, Avraham Deshe and Shaike Ophir; Produced by Chaim Topol
1970	Take Off (Hitromamut)	Yes	No	No	Written by Talila Ben-Zakai
1971	Bloomfield (AKA The Hero)	Yes	No	No	Co-directed with Richard Harris; Written by Joseph Gross, Richard Harris and Wolf Mankowitz
1971	The Rooster (Ha-Tarnegol)	Yes	No	No	Written by Dirk Clement and Haim Hefer
1972	Metzitzim	Yes	Yes	No	Co-written with Arik Einstein
1974	Big Eyes	Yes	Yes	No	Co-written with Yaakov Shabtai
1977	Save the Lifeguard (Hatzilu Et HaMatzil)	Yes	Yes	No	

=== Television ===
Year	Title				
Year	Title	Director	Writer	Producer	Notes
1970-1973	Lool (Chicken Coop)	Yes	Yes	No	Co-directed with Boaz Davidson; Co-written with Arik Einstein and Tzvi Shissel

=== Acting roles ===
Year	Title	Role	Notes	Ref
1959	Pillar of Fire	Yossi	Film directed by Larry Frisch	
1960	Exodus		Film directed by Otto Preminger	
1960	Burning Sands	David	Film directed by Raphael Nussbaum	
1964	Dreamboat (Ulai Terdu Sham)	Uri	Film directed by Amatsia Hiuni and Puchu	
1964	Hole in the Moon		Film, also directed	
1966	Sabina		Film directed by Peter Freistadt	
1966	Motive to Murder (Miftan le-Ratzah)		Film directed by Peter Freistadt	
1967	Aliza Mizrahi	Mattathias Bar Daroma	Film directed by Menahem Golan	
1968	The Other Side		Short film, also directed	
1969	Blaumilch Canal	Orchestra conductor	Film directed by Ephraim Kishon	
1970-1973	Lool (Chicken Coop)	Various (sketch)	TV series, also directed	
1971	The Rooster (Ha-Tarnegol)		Film, also directed	
1972	Metzitzim	Gutte	Film, also directed	
1973	They Call Me Shmil (Koreyim Li Shmil)	Joe	Film directed by George Ovadiah	
1973	Schwartz: The Brave Detective (Ha-Balash Ha'Amitz Shvartz)		Film directed by Ami Artzi and Lloyd Kaufman	
1974	Big Eyes (Einayim G'dolot)	Benny Furman	Film, also directed	
1977	Save the Lifeguard (Hatzilu Et HaMatzil)		Film, also directed	

== Published works ==
- My Friends, We Were Robbed
- Waking Up Jewish

== See also ==
- Cinema of Israel
