= Brennender Sand =

1960 film

- Directed by: Raphael Nussbaum
- Written by: Raphael Nussbaum
- Starring: Daliah Lavi; Gert Günther Hoffmann; Abraham Eisenberg
- Cinematography: Wolf Göthe; Yitzhak Herbst
- Edited by: Erika Shtegman
- Music by: Sigfried Wagner; Siegfried Wegener
- Production companies: Aero Film; Ran Film
- Release date: 21 July 1960
- Running time: 97 minutes
- Countries: Israel; West Germany
- Language: German
- Budget: 1 million Deutschmarks

Brennender Sand (Hebrew: Kholot lohatot, lit. 'Burning Sand') is a 1960 German-Israeli adventure film.

== History ==
The movie was directed by Raphael Nussbaum, starring Daliah Lavi, Gert Günther Hoffmann and Abraham Eisenberg. It was the first German-Israeli feature film.

== Cast ==
- Daliah Lavi
- Gert Günther Hoffmann
- Abraham Eisenberg
- Uri Zohar
- Oded Kotler
- Gila Almagor
- Natan Cogan
- Abraham Barzilai
- Hillel Ne'eman
- Abraham Ronai
- Abi Ofarim (musician)
- Esther Ofarim (musician)

== See also ==
- Garden of Evil
- Cinema of Israel
