= Aliza Mizrahi =

- Original film poster
- 999... עליזה מזרחי
- Directed by: Menahem Golan
- Written by: Menahem Golan
- Produced by: Menahem Golan
- Starring: Edna Fleidel; Avner Hizkiyahu; Yossi Banai; Uri Zohar; Arieh Elias; Arik Lavie
- Cinematography: Nissim Leon
- Edited by: Dannu Schick
- Music by: Rafi Ben Moshe
- Release date: 1967
- Running time: 104 minutes
- Country: Israel
- Language: Hebrew

Aliza Mizrahi (Hebrew: 999... עליזה מזרחי) is a 1967 Israeli detective comedy film written, produced and directed by Menahem Golan. The film belongs to the Bourekas film genre, a genre of Israeli comic melodrama films popular in the 1960s and 1970.

It is an adaptation of Golan's 1952 play, which was first produced by his Shdera Company. It tells the story of a cleaning woman, Aliza Mizrahi in a Tel Aviv office. Mizrahi becomes an amateur detective amid a series of mysterious murders.

== Plot ==
The firm of Green, Greenberg and Greenbaum is in trouble: large quantities of jam are missing from the storage. Worse, two of the senior partners are murdered. The incompetent inspector Klein (Avner Hizkiyahu) is trying to solve the case, without much success, while the cleaning woman Aliza Mizrahi (Edna Fliedel) conducts an investigation of her own and finds the culprit. Most of the film is set in Shalom Meir Tower in Tel Aviv, which was once the tallest building in the Middle East.

== Cast ==
- Edna Fleidel as Aliza Mizrahi
- Avner Hizkiyahu as Police Officer Superintendent Yosef Klein
- Arieh Elias as Aharon Mizrahi
- Yossi Banai as Theodore Rothschild, photographer
- Arik Lavie as Yarkoni
- Uri Zohar as the Symbol of Matityahu
- Ziva Rodan-Shafir as Mrs Green
- Elisheva Michaeli as Malka Davidov

== Release ==
Aliza Mizrahi premiered on March 23, 1967 at the Israeli Film festival in Ashkelon starring Edna Fliedel. The premiere was attended by Israel's tourism minister and the mayor of Ashkelon. Aliza Mizrahi was the opening film of the festival.

== Reception ==
The film was a box office hit in Israel.

== Stage productions ==
Golan originally wrote the story as a theatrical play, and it was produced by his Shdera Company in 1952. In 2008, Golan revived the play and Shdera, returning to his theatrical roots. The revived version of the play starred the actors, Michal Zuaretz, Nir Levy, Albert Iluz and Tzachi Noy.

== See also ==
- Cinema of Israel
