= Cinema of Israel =

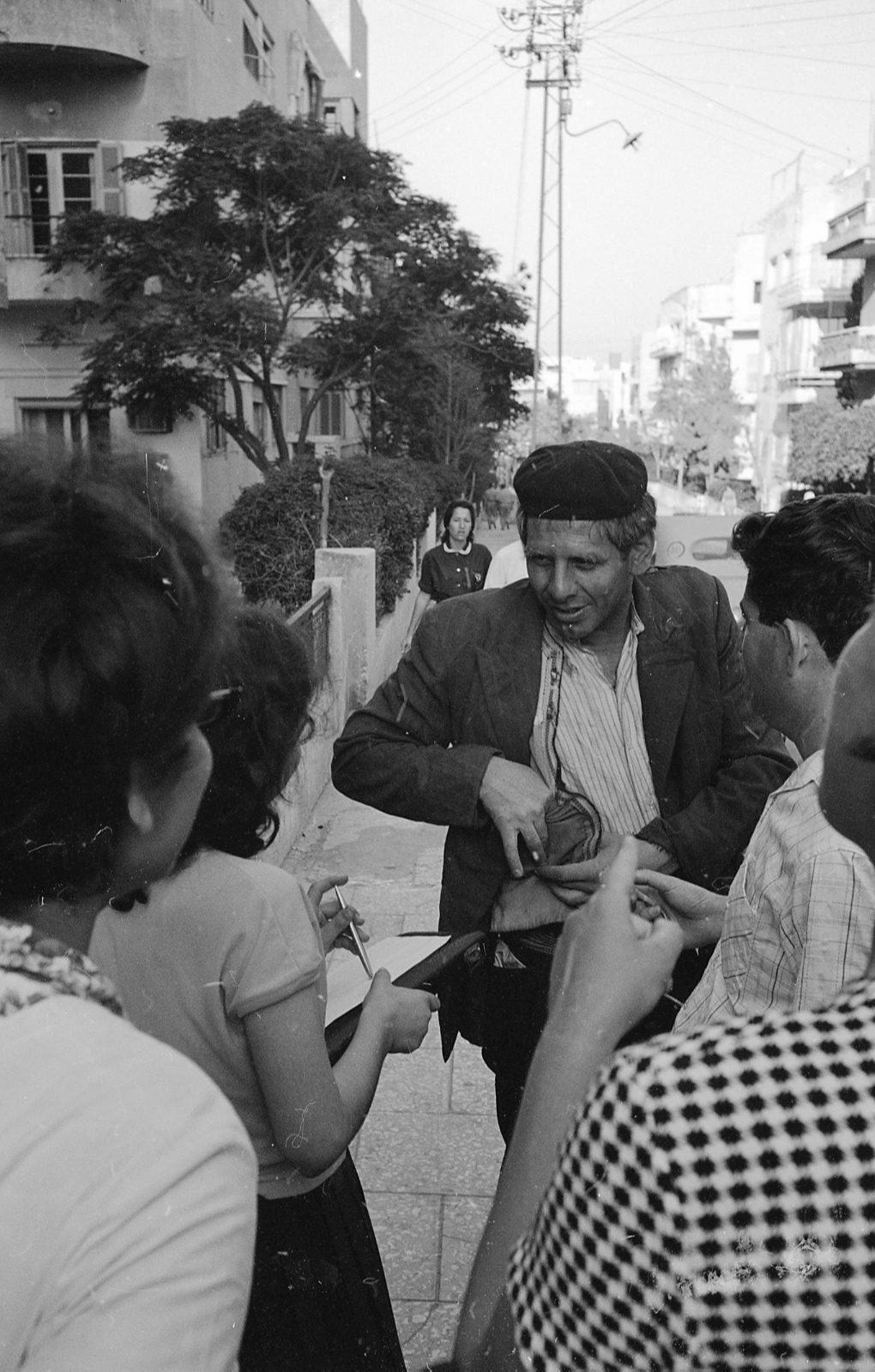
- Chaim Topol rehearsing for Sallah Shabati, 1964.
- No. of screens: 286 (2011)
  - Per capita: 4.4 per 100,000 (2011)
- Main distributors: United King; Globus Group; Forum Cinemas

Number of admissions (2011)
- Total: 12,462,537
  - Per capita: 1.5 (2012)

Gross box office (2012)
- Total: €94.6 million (₪454.8 million)

Cinema of Israel (Hebrew: קולנוע ישראלי, romanized: Kolnoa Yisraeli) comprises the film industry and its film productions, whether made within the State of Israel or by Israeli film production companies abroad. Most Israeli films are produced in Hebrew, but there are productions in other languages such as Arabic and English. Israel has been nominated for more Academy Awards for Best Foreign Language Film than any other country in the Middle East.

Israel's first full-length feature film, Hill 24 Doesn't Answer (1955) was directed by Britain's Thorold Dickinson and retells the Establishment of the State of Israel in 1948 and the War of Independence. In the 1950s and early 1960s, a number of British and American films were set and filmed in Israel. These included the epic historical drama, Exodus (1960), also about the founding of the State of Israel. The film, directed by Otto Preminger, was based on the 1958 novel of the same name by Leon Uris and starred Paul Newman.

Since the establishment of the Jewish state in 1948, filmmakers focused on nation-building, Zionism, collectivism and Socialist ideals. There was a narrative focus on Aliyah and the integration of these Jewish migrants into Israeli society, as well as Making the desert bloom and heroic depictions of the Israeli soldier.

The 1960s and 1970s marked a departure, with the emergence of the New Sensibility movement.The movement was characterised by its focus on individual autonomy and its embrace of reflexivity and auteur-driven storytelling. The movement was strongly influenced by the French New Wave and Italian Neorealism. The genre was pioneered by Uri Zohar with films such as Three Days and a Child (1967) and Big Eyes (1967). Moshé Mizrahi was also a significant filmmaker of the genre, with I Love You Rosa (1972) and The House on Chelouche Street (1973). Films from this movement often drew critical acclaim.

In the same period, the larger and more commercially successful Bourekas genre emerged. This was characterised by the ethnic tensions between the Ashkenazim and the Mizrahim or Sephardim and the conflict between rich and poor. The genre was led by directors such as Ephraim Kishon and Menahem Golan producing popular films such as Sallah Shabati (1964) and Kazablan (1973). Stars such as Chaim Topol and Gila Almagor rose to prominence during this period.

Holocaust representation began to appear toward the end of the Mandate Palestine era, with My Father's House (1947), and more projects emerging from the late-1970s onwards.

Israeli cinema has since concerned itself with social themes, Moshe Dayan's Life According to Agfa (1993) looks at revellers and employees of a Tel Aviv pub as a microcosm of Israeli society. Dan Wolman's Hide and Seek (1980) was the first Israeli picture to address homosexual themes. Amazing Grace (1992) by Amos Guttman deals with AIDS in Tel Aviv's gay community. Yossi & Jagger (2002) by Eytan Fox explores romance between two Israel Defense Forces soldiers, and returns to central gay themes in Yossi (2012) and Sublet (2020). Ofir Raul Graizer's film The Cakemaker (2017) was also notable for its depiction of homosexuality and grief.

Marriage and divorce have also been prominent themes for Israeli filmmakers, with Lior Ashkenazi and Ronit Elkabetz in Dover Kosashvili's drama, Late Marriage (2001) as a couple who are subject to the intervention of tradition-minded Georgian Jewish immigrant relatives. Elkabetz also starred in a critically acclaimed trilogy about the unhappy marriage of Viviane Amsalem, in To Take a Wife (2004), Shiva (2008) and Gett: The Trial of Viviane Amsalem (2014). Rama Burshtein also explores Haredi marriage and engagement in Fill the Void (2012).

Filmmakers have also tackled war with Israel's neighbours, with Kippur (2000) by Amos Gitai which deals with the Yom Kippur War and Waltz with Bashir (2008) by Ari Folman, which tackles conflict with Lebanon. Talya Lavie explores female IDF soldiers in the black comedy, Zero Motivation (2014). Samuel Maoz also deals with military themes in Foxtrot (2017). Arab-Jewish relations are also explored in other contexts, through a friendship between small-town Israeli Jews and a visiting Egyptian Ceremonial Police Orchestra in Eran Kolirin's The Band's Visit (2007).

Israel hosts the Jerusalem Film Festival, held annually since 1984. The Ophir Awards are the most prestigious awards at national level and awarded by the Israeli Academy of Film and Television. The event is the Israeli equivalent of the American Academy Awards.

== Background ==
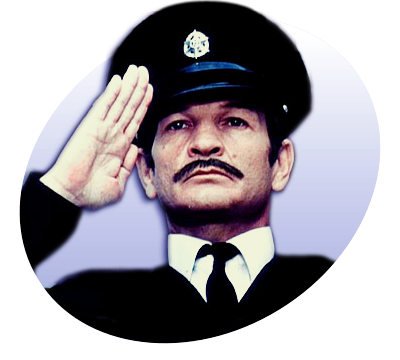
Shaike Ophir in The Policeman

Movies were made in Mandatory Palestine from the beginning of the silent film era although the development of the local film industry accelerated after the establishment of the state. Early films were mainly documentary or news roundups, shown in cinemas before the movie started. The earliest film shot entirely in Mandatory Palestine was Murray Rosenberg's 1911 documentary, The First Film of Palestine.

In 1933, a children's book by Zvi Lieberman Oded ha-noded was made into a silent film called Oded the Wanderer, Palestine"s first full-length feature film for children, produced on a shoestring budget with private financing. In 1938, another book by Lieberman, Me’al ha-khoravot was made into a film called Over the Ruins, which tells the story of children in a Second Temple Jewish village in the Galilee where all the adults were killed by the Romans. It is 70-minutes with a soundtrack and dialogue. Lieberman wrote the screenplay. Produced by Nathan Axelrod and directed by Alfred Wolf. Production costs came to 1,000 Palestine pounds. It failed at the box office but is considered a precursor of Israeli cinema.

One of the precursors of cinema in Israel was Baruch Agadati. Agadati purchased cinematographer Yaakov Ben Dov's film archives in 1934 when Ben Dov retired from filmmaking and together with his brother Yitzhak established the AGA Newsreel. In 1935, he directed a film entitled This is the Land (Zot Hi Haaretz).

== History ==
In 1948, Yosef Navon, a soundman, and Abigail Diamond, American producer of the first Hebrew-language film at age 15, Baruch Agadati, found an investor, businessman Mordechai Navon, who invested his own money in film and lab equipment. Agadati used his connections among Haganah comrades to acquire land for a studio. In 1949 the Geva Films studio was established on the site of an abandoned woodshed in Givatayim.

In 1954, the Knesset passed the Law for the Encouragement of Israeli Films (החוק לעידוד הסרט הישראלי), the following year Hill 24 Doesn't Answer was released as the first Israeli feature film. Leading filmmakers in the 1960s were Menahem Golan, Ephraim Kishon, and Uri Zohar.

The first Bourekas film was Sallah Shabati, produced by Ephraim Kishon in 1964. In 1965, Uri Zohar produced the film Hole in the Moon, influenced by French New Wave films.

In the first decade of the 21st century, several Israeli films won awards in film festivals around the world. Prominent films of this period include Late Marriage (Dover Koshashvili), Broken Wings, Walk on Water and Yossi & Jagger (Eytan Fox), Nina's Tragedies, Campfire and Beaufort (Joseph Cedar), Or (My Treasure) (Keren Yedaya), Turn Left at the End of the World (Avi Nesher), The Band's Visit (Eran Kolirin) Waltz with Bashir (Ari Folman), and Ajami. In 2011, Strangers No More won the Oscar for Best Short Documentary. In 2013 two documentaries were nominated the Oscar for the Best Feature Documentary: The Gatekeepers (Dror Moreh) and Five Broken Cameras, a Palestinian-Israeli-French co-production (Emad Burnat and Guy Davidi). In 2019, Synonyms (Nadav Lapid) won the Golden Bear award at the 69th Berlin International Film Festival. In 2021, Ahed's Knee, directed too by Lapid, was selected to compete for the Palme d'Or at the 2021 Cannes Film Festival and shared the Jury Prize.

Author Julie Gray notes, "Israeli film is certainly not new in Israel, but it is fast gaining attention in the U.S., which is a double-edged sword. American distributors feel that the small American audience interested in Israeli film, are squarely focused on the turbulent and troubled conflict that besets us daily."

In 2014 Israeli-made films sold 1.6 million tickets in Israel, the best in Israel's film history.

== Genres ==
=== Documentary films ===
Israeli and Zionist documentary films were shot both before and after 1948, often with the purpose of not just informing Jews living elsewhere, but also for attracting donations from them and for persuading them to immigrate. Among the pioneers who were active both as photographers and cinematographers are Ya'acov Ben-Dov (1882–1968) and Lazar Dünner (most often spelled Dunner; 1912–1994). Dünner first worked as a cinematographer, gradually moving into other film-making tasks. In 1937 he shot the 15-minute film "A Day in Degania", in full colour, giving us a document about the first kibbutz some 27 years after it being established, and with the Nazi threat still "just" as a background threat, not fully mentioned by name. In 1949, after years of war, Dünner would start churning out short documentaries of this type, narrated in English for the benefit of the mainly US public.

=== Bourekas films ===
Bourekas films (סרטי בורקס) were a film genre popular in the 1960s and 1970s. Central themes include ethnic tensions between the Ashkenazim and the Mizrahim or Sephardim and the conflict between rich and poor. The term was supposedly coined by the Israeli film director Boaz Davidson, the creator of several such films, as a play-on-words, after "spaghetti Western:" just as the Western subgenre was named after a notable dish of its country of filming, so the Israeli genre was named after the notable Israeli dish, Bourekas, although somesay the term originated from a scene in The Policeman where the title character is shown giving one of his coworkers a bourekas. Bourekas films are further characterized by accent imitations (particularly of Moroccan Jews, Polish Jews, Romanian Jews and Persian Jews); a combination of melodrama, comedy and slapstick; and alternate identities. Bourekas films were successes at the box office but were often panned by the critics. They included comedy films such as Charlie Ve'hetzi and Hagiga B'Snuker and sentimental melodramas such as Nurit. Prominent filmmakers in this genre during this period include Boaz Davidson, Ze'ev Revach, Yehuda Barkan and George Ovadiah.

=== New Sensibility ===
The New Sensibility (סרטי הרגישות החדשה) is a movement which started during the 1960s and lasted until the end of the 1970s. The movement sought to create a cinema in modernist cinema with artistic and esthetic values, inspired by the French New Wave and Italian Neorealism. The movement produced social artistic films such as But Where Is Daniel Wax? by Avraham Heffner. The Policeman Azoulay (Ephraim Kishon), I Love You Rosa and The House on Chelouche Street by Moshé Mizrahi were candidates for an Oscar Award in the foreign film category. One of the most important creators in this genre is Uri Zohar, who directed Hor B'Levana (Hole In The Moon) and Three Days and a Child.

== Movie theaters ==
In the early 1900s, silent movies were screened in sheds, cafes and other temporary structures. In 1905, Cafe Lorenz opened on Jaffa Road in the new Jewish neighborhood of Neve Tzedek. From 1909, the Lorenz family began screening movies at the cafe. In 1925, the Kessem Cinema was housed there for a short time. Silent films were screened there, accompanied by commentary and piano playing by a member of the Templer community.

In 1953, Cinema Keren, the Negev's first movie theater, opened in Beersheba. It was built by the Histadrut and had seating for 1,200 people.

In 1966, 2.6 million Israelis went to the cinema over 50 million times. In 1968, when television broadcasting began, theaters began to close down, first in the periphery, then in major cities. Three hundred thirty standalone theaters were torn down or redesigned as multiplex theaters.

=== Eden Cinema, Tel Aviv ===
The Eden Cinema (Kolnoa Eden) was built in 1914. The building, which still stands at the beginning of Lilienblum Street in Neve Tzedek, had two 800-seat halls: a roofed one for winter and an outdoor hall for screenings in the pre-air-conditioning summer heat. Owners Mordechai Abarbanel and Moshe Visser were granted a 13-year exclusive municipal license. When Eden's monopoly expired in 1927, other cinemas sprang up around Tel Aviv.

During World War I, the theater was shut down by order of the Ottoman government on the pretext that its generator could be used to send messages to enemy submarines offshore. It reopened to the public during the British Mandate and became a hub of cultural and social activity. It closed down in 1974.

=== Mograbi Cinema, Tel Aviv ===
The Mograbi Cinema (Kolnoa Mograbi) opened in 1930. The cinema was established by Yaakov Mograbi, an affluent Jewish merchant who immigrated from Damascus, at the request of Meir Dizengoff, then mayor of Tel Aviv. The building housed two large halls: on the upper floor a cinema with a sliding roof that could be opened on the hot summer days, and a performance hall that was the venue of the first Hebrew theaters, among them Hamatateh, HaOhel, Habima, and the Cameri. It was designed by architect Joseph Berlin in an art deco style that was popular in cinemas worldwide. People gathered in front of the theater to dance in the streets when the UN General Assembly voted in favor of the Partition Plan in November 1947. After a fire in the summer of 1986 due to an electric short circuit, the building was demolished. In 2011, plans were submitted to rebuild a replica of the original cinema with a luxury high-rise above it.

=== Allenby Cinema, Tel Aviv ===
The Allenby Cinema was designed by Shlomo Gepstein, an Odessa-born architect who immigrated to Palestine in the 1920s. It was a large, imposing building in the International Style. In the 1900s, it housed Allenby 58, a famous nightclub.

=== Armon Cinema, Haifa ===
In 1931, Moshe Greidinger opened a cinema in Haifa. In 1935 he built a second movie theater, Armon, a large art-deco building with 1,800 seats that became the heart of Haifa's entertainment district. It was also used as a performance venue by the Israel Philharmonic Orchestra and the Israeli Opera.

=== Alhambra Cinema, Jaffa ===
The art deco Alhambra cinema, with seating for 1,100, opened in Jaffa in 1937. It was designed by a Lebanese architect, Elias al-Mor, and became a popular venue for concerts of Arab music. Farid al-Atrash and Umm Kulthum appeared there. In 2012, the historic building reopened as a Scientology center after two years of renovation.

=== Smadar Theater, Jerusalem ===
The Smadar theater was built in Jerusalem's German Colony in 1928. It was German-owned and mainly served the British Army. In 1935, it opened for commercial screenings as the "Orient Cinema." It was turned over to Jewish management to keep it from being boycotted as a German business, infuriating the head of the Nazi Party branch in Jerusalem. After 1948, it was bought by four demobilized soldiers, one of them Arye Chechik, who bought out his partners in 1950. According to a journalist who lived next door, Chechik sold the tickets, ran to collect them at the door and worked as the projectionist. His wife ran the concession stand.

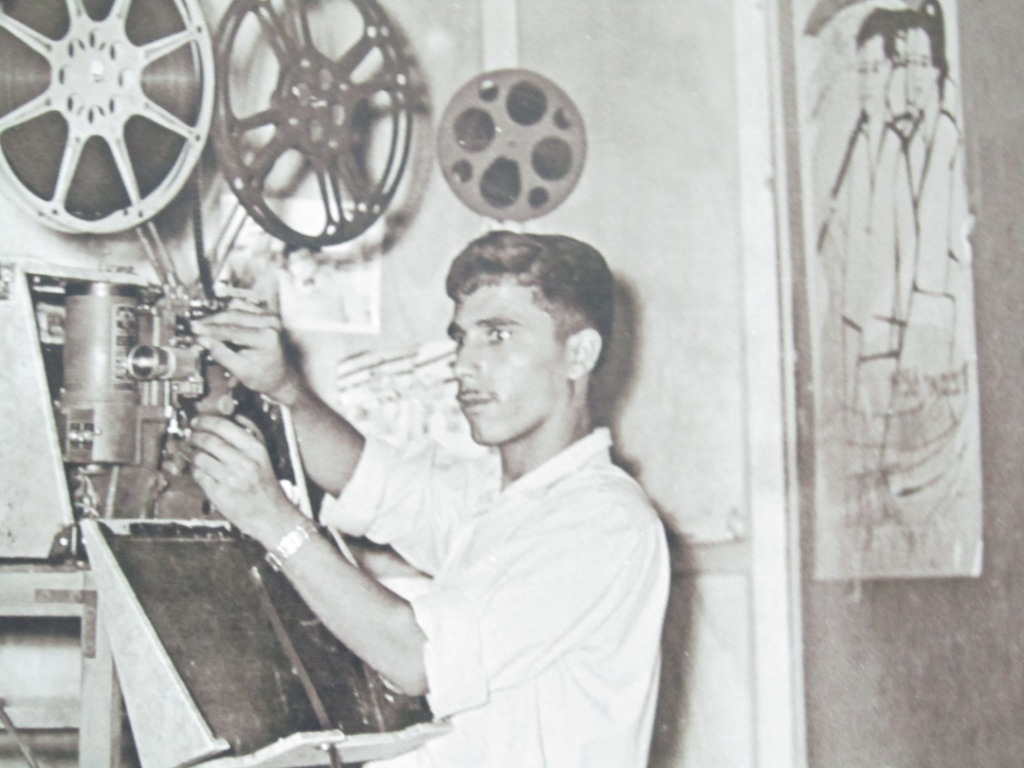
Beit Shemesh movie theater, early 1950s

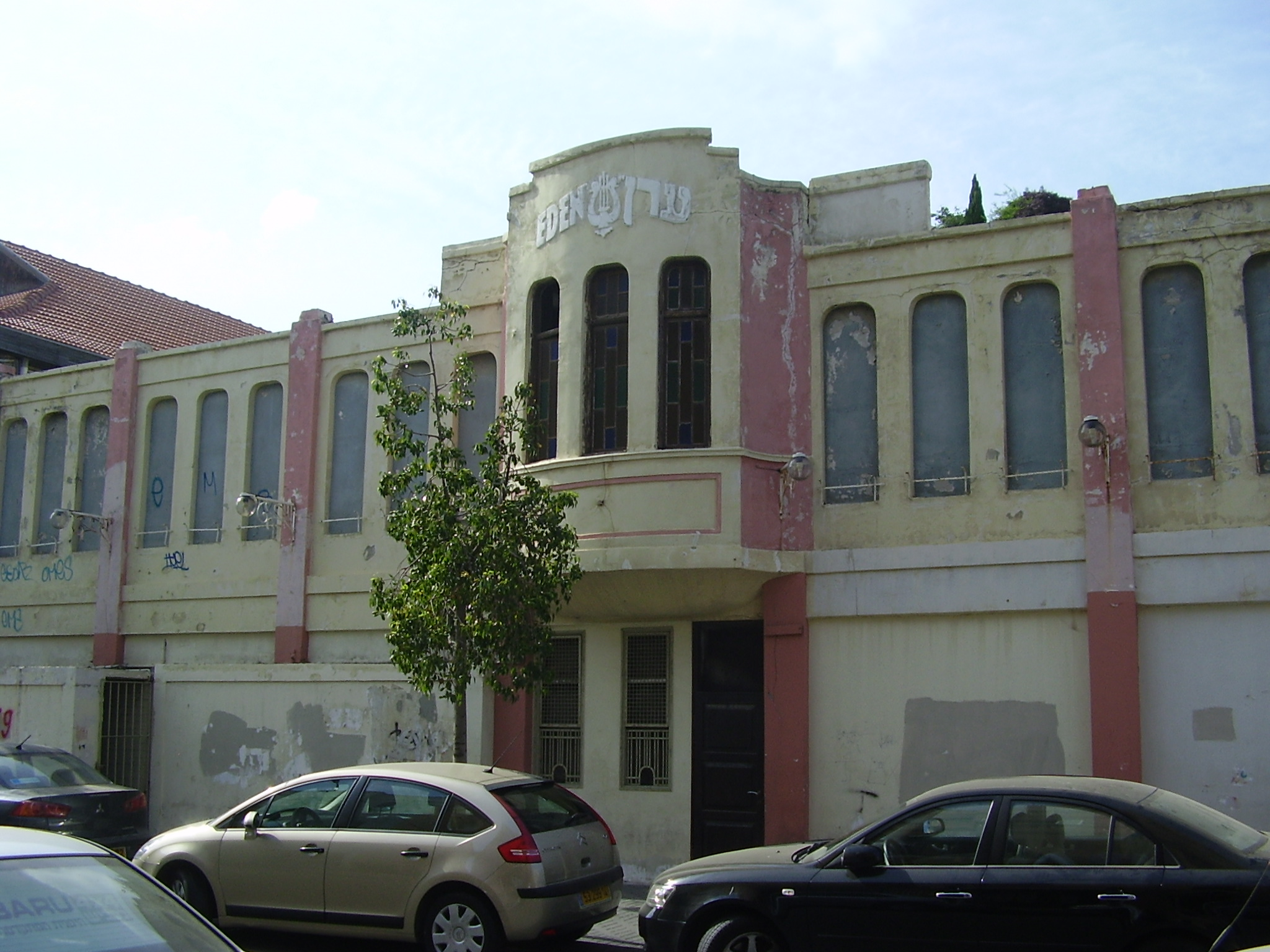
Eden Cinema, Tel Aviv

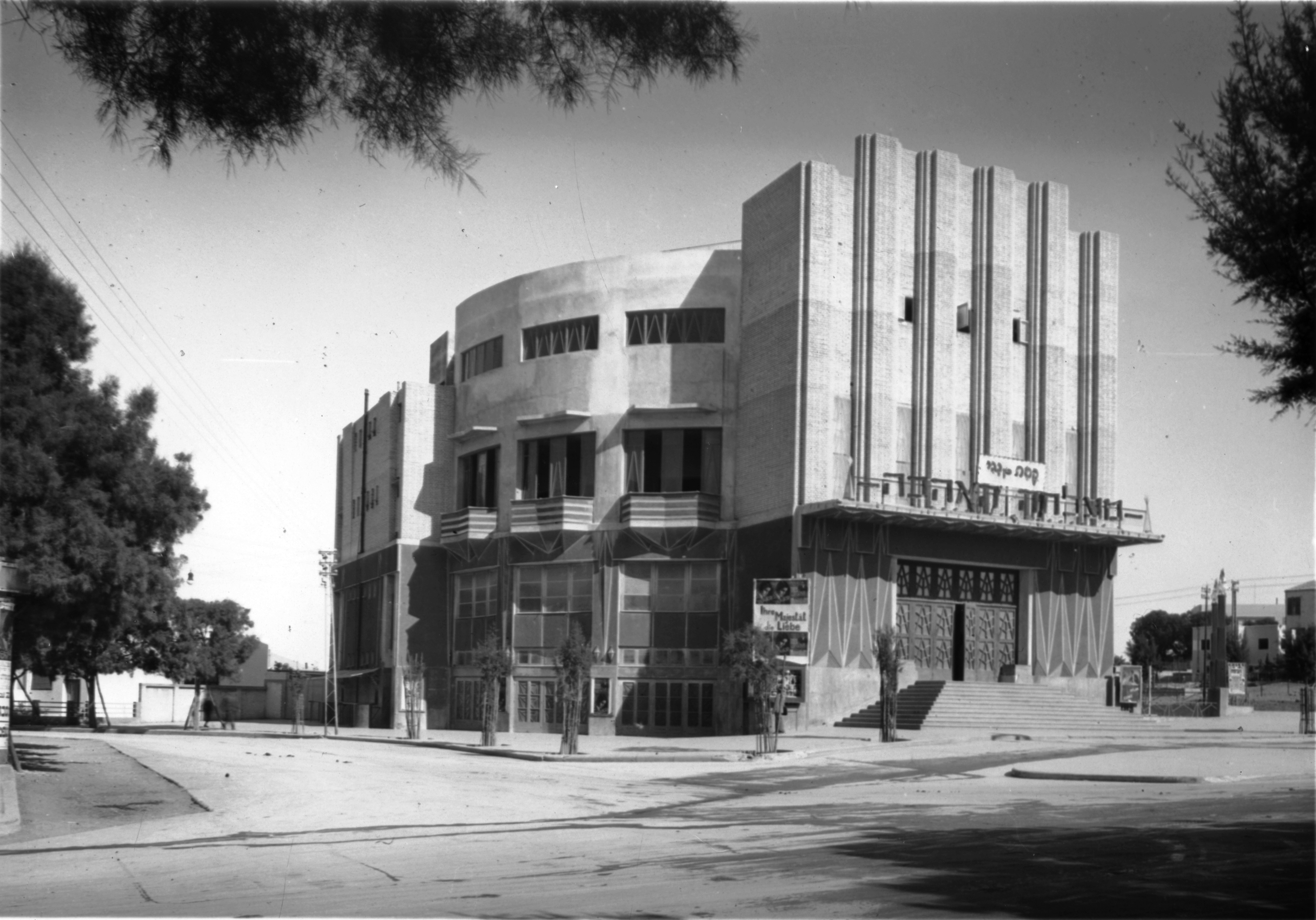
Mograbi Theater, Tel Aviv

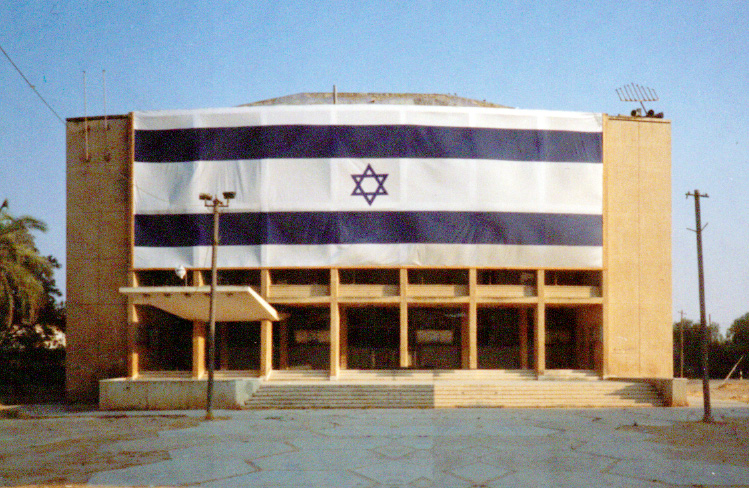
Keren Cinema, first movie theater in the Negev

Rimon movie theater, Tel Aviv, 1939

== Cinema festivals ==
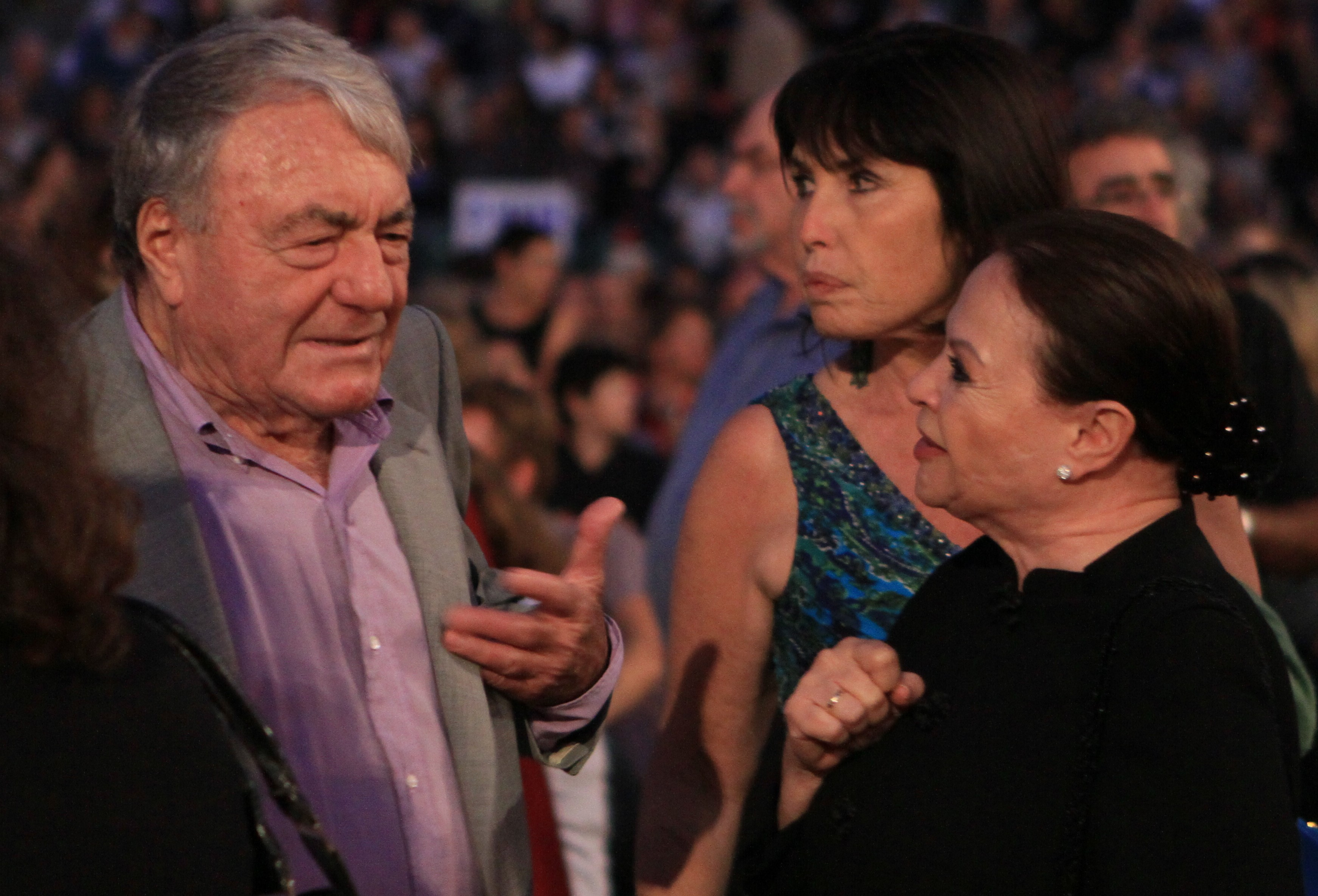
Gila Almagor and Claude Lanzmann, Jerusalem Film Festival

The main international film festivals in Israel are the Jerusalem Film Festival and the Haifa Film Festival.

== Cinema awards ==
- Ophir Award
- Wolgin Award

== Film schools ==
- Sam Spiegel Film and Television School
- Ma'aleh School of Television, Film and the Arts

== See also ==
- Culture of Israel
- Israeli films of the 1950s
- Jewish culture § Cinema
- List of Israeli films
- List of Israeli submissions for the Academy Award for Best Foreign Language Film
- Media of Israel
- Edison Theater (Jerusalem)
