= New Sensibility =

Israeli cinema movement

- Oded Kotler in Three Days and a Child (1967) by Uri Zohar
- Years active: 1960s to 1970s
- Location: Israel
- Major figures: Uri Zohar, Moshé Mizrahi, Avraham Heffner, Dan Wolman, Jacques Katmor, Yaky Yosha, David Perlov, Assi Dayan
- Influences: Italian neorealism, French New Wave

The New Sensibility (Hebrew: הרגישות החדשה, romanized: HaRagishut HaHadasha) was an Israeli film movement active during the 1960s and 1970s. It was the Israeli filmmaker's response to world art film. During this period, around fifty films produced were associated with the movement.

The movement was characterised by its focus on individual autonomy and its embrace of reflexivity and auteur-driven storytelling. It was also a departure from Israeli cinema up to that point, which had largely focused on nation-building, Zionism, collectivism and Socialist ideals. It was influenced by modern European cinema, particularly the French New Wave and Italian Neorealism.

== Origins of the movement ==
The social and cultural framework for the movement began to emerge in mid-1950s Israeli society. According to Israeli filmmaker and film scholar, Prof. Yehuda (Judd) Ne'eman, in this period "a new urban identity began to crystallize and a new generation of poets, novelists, painters, sculptors and musicians, later known as the "state generation", emerged and immediately became a mouthpiece for modernism and contemporary art in the country." Local film schools were also established amid the flourishing arts scene.

The cinematic origins of the movement can be traced back to two films, beginning with David Perlov's lyrical documentary, In Jerusalem (1963). This was followed by Hole in the Moon (1964), directed by Uri Zohar, which has been described as the precursor of the movement and Israel's first Modernist film. The movement is commonly understood to begin in 1967, after the Israeli victory in the Six-Day War. Israel experienced an economic boom following the war and this led to increased government funding for the film industry, fostering the ambitions of a cohort of younger filmmakers.

Until this point, Israeli cinema had largely concerned itself with focusing on Zionism, socialist ideals and issues such as the integration of Jewish migrants into Israeli society, Making the desert bloom and the collective spirit of the kibbutzim.These themes became exhausted on-screen and two distinct movements and genres emerged, New Sensibility and the Bourekas film. However, New Sensibility also emerged in the same period as the Bourekas film. Haaretz film critic Uri Klein describes this commercially successful genre as a "peculiarly Israeli genre of comic melodramas or tearjerkers... based on ethnic stereotypes". New Sensibility was the smaller of the two genres and less commercially successful. However, films from this genre often received critical acclaim.

Furthermore, the global influences, particularly European modern film, reflected the changing economic conditions in those countries. Post-Second World War had been marked by three decades of prosperity in Western Europe. These robust national economies could then support non-commercial art films. In this context, influential filmmaker emerged such as Jean-Luc Godard, Federico Fellini and Ingmar Bergman. In this context too, Israel's burgeoning middle class was becoming increasingly attracted to the consumerism and individualism of Western Europe in contrast to the collective, national commitment depicted in earlier cinema.

== Development of the movement ==
Uri Zohar is credited as the initiator of the movement and the most influential and prolific filmmaker of the genre. Other significant directors that worked in this movement included Moshé Mizrahi, Avraham Heffner, Dan Wolman, Jacques Katmor, Yaky Yosha and David Perlov. New Sensibility films were mostly made by Israeli Jewish men of an Ashkenazi background.

Most of the films were set and filmed in Tel Aviv, a modern, secular and cosmopolitan city aligned with the cultural identity of the New Sensitivity movement. According to filmmaker and scholar, Judd Ne'eman, "New Sensibility films were characterized by low-budget production, black-and-white film, shots done on location using live urban scenery, debutant actors and non-actors playing principal roles, improvised scripts, fragmentary plots with open endings, the use of vernacular language and slang, experimental cinema rhetoric, existential malaise and so on."

Scholarly interpretations have drawn on the movement's European influence:

They simultaneously portrayed and encouraged the cultural development of a private self, creatively adopting and participating in international modernist styles like Italian neorealism and French New Wave. These films dealt with individual concerns using the themes of sexuality and death. Sexuality was represented with an explicit or implicit reference to its articulation in psychoanalysis, while finitude and death were conceptualized mainly through existentialism.This combination of international modernism in style and a heightened sense of subjectivity, and freedom from collectivism, appealed to sophisticated urban elites who wanted to see themselves and Israeli society portrayed in similar ways to European art films. At their best these films expressed a new kind of Israeliness that proved a highly creative adaptation of high art films to Israeli setting.

— Ari Ofengenden, scholar

Zohar's contemporaries depicted the Israeli character in a European light, whereas Zohar reinforced provincial lifestyle and the glare of the Israeli sun. He saw these elements, even vulgarity as authentic. Some of Zohar's most notable films from the movement include the critically acclaimed, Metzitzim (1972) and Big Eyes (1974). According to scholar, Ari Ofendengden:"Zohar was inspired by the style of East European art films while dealing with private concerns of sexual desire in defiance of collective state ideology."

== Notable New Sensibility films ==
- Hole in the Moon, Dir. Uri Zohar (1964; considered to be a precursor of the movement)
- Three Days and a Child, Dir. Uri Zohar (1967)
- A Woman's Case, Dir. Jacques Katmor (1969)
- The Dress, Dir. Judd Ne'eman (1969)
- The Dreamer, Dir. Dan Wolman
- Shablul (Snail) (1970), Dir. Boaz Davidson
- I Love You Rosa, Dir. Moshé Mizrahi (1972)
- But Where Is Daniel Wax?, Dir. Avraham Heffner (1972)
- Haglula (The Pill), Dir. David Perlov (1972)
- Or Min Hahefker (Light Out of Nowhere), Dir. Nissim Dayan
- The House on Chelouche Street, Dir. Moshé Mizrahi (1973)
- My Michael, Dir. Dan Wolman (1974)
- Feast for the Eyes, Dir. Assi Dayan (1975)
- Hagiga La'einayim (Saint Cohen), Dir. Assi Dayan (1975)
- Habanana Hashchora (The Black Banana), Dir. Benjamin Hayeem (1976)
- Uri Zohar's Tel Aviv Trilogy
  - Metzitzim (1972)
  - Big Eyes (1974)
  - Save the Lifeguard (הצילו את המציל, Hatzilu Et HaMatzil, 1977)
