= 1967 Cannes Film Festival =

- Official poster of the 20th Cannes Film Festival, an original illustration by René Ferracci.
- Opening film: I Killed Rasputin
- Closing film: Batouk
- Location: Cannes, France
- Founded: 1946
- Awards: Grand Prix du Festival; International du Film: Blowup
- No. of films: 24 (In Competition)
- Festival date: 27 April 1967 – 12 May 1967
- Website: festival-cannes.com/en

Cannes Film Festival
- 1968 1966

The 20th Cannes Film Festival took place from 27 April to 12 May 1967. Italian filmmaker Alessandro Blasetti served as jury president for the main competition.

The Grand Prix du Festival International du Film, then the festival's main prize, was awarded to Blowup by Michelangelo Antonioni.

The festival opened with I Killed Rasputin by Robert Hossein, and closed with Batouk by Jean Jacques Manigot.

== Juries ==
=== Main Competition ===
- Alessandro Blasetti, Italian filmmaker - Jury President
- Georges Lourau, French producer - Jury Vice-President
- Sergei Bondarchuk, Soviet actor and filmmaker
- René Bonnell, French
- Jean-Louis Bory, French journalist and writer
- Miklós Jancsó, Hungarian filmmaker
- Claude Lelouch, French filmmaker
- Shirley MacLaine, American actress
- Vincente Minnelli, American filmmaker
- Georges Neveux, French writer
- Gian Luigi Rondi, Italian writer
- Ousmane Sembène, Senegalese filmmaker

=== Short Films Competition ===
- Mark Turfkhuyer, Belgian journalist - Jury President
- Tahar Cheriaa, Tunisian
- André Coutant, French technician
- Zdravka Koleva, Bulgarian
- Jean Schmidt, French

== Official selection ==
=== In Competition ===
The following feature films competed for the Grand Prix du Festival International du Film:

English title	Original title	Director(s)	Production country
Accident		Joseph Losey	United Kingdom
Blowup		Michelangelo Antonioni	United Kingdom, Italy
The Climax	L'immorale	Pietro Germi	Italy
Degree of Murder	Mord und Totschlag	Volker Schlöndorff	West Germany
Elvira Madigan		Bo Widerberg	Sweden
Entranced Earth	Terra em Transe	Glauber Rocha	Brazil
Hagbard and Signe	Den røde kappe / Den röda kappan / Rauða skikkjan	Gabriel Axel	Denmark, Sweden, Iceland
Hotel for Strangers	Hotel pro cizince	Antonín Máša	Czechoslovakia
I Even Met Happy Gypsies	Скупљачи перја	Aleksandar Petrović	Yugoslavia
Katerina Izmailova	Катерина Измайлова	Mikhail Shapiro	Soviet Union
The Killing Game	Jeu de massacre	Alain Jessua	France
The Last Meeting	Último encuentro	Antonio Eceiza	Spain
My Love, My Love	Mon amour, mon amour	Nadine Trintignant	France
Misunderstood	Incompreso	Luigi Comencini	Italy
Monday's Child	La chica del lunes	Leopoldo Torre Nilsson	Argentina
Mouchette		Robert Bresson	France
Pedro Páramo		Carlos Velo	Mexico
Ten Thousand Days	Tízezer nap	Ferenc Kósa	Hungary
Three Days and a Child	שלושה ימים וילד	Uri Zohar	Israel
Ulysses		Joseph Strick	Ireland, United Kingdom, United States
The Unknown Man of Shandigor	L'Inconnu de Shandigor	Jean-Louis Roy	Switzerland
We Still Kill the Old Way	A ciascuno il suo	Elio Petri	Italy
The Winds of the Aures	ريح الاوراس	Mohammed Lakhdar-Hamina	Algeria
You're a Big Boy Now		Francis Ford Coppola	United States

=== Out of Competition ===
The following films were selected to be screened out of competition:

English title	Original title	Director(s)	Production country
Batouk (closing film)		Jean Jacques Manigot	France
Closely Watched Trains	Ostre sledované vlaky	Jiří Menzel	Czechoslovakia
Le Conquérent de l'inutile (A la mémoire de Lionel Terray)		Marcel Ichac	France
I Killed Rasputin (opening film)	J'ai tué Raspoutine	Robert Hossein	France, Italy
Privilege		Peter Watkins	United Kingdom
Restauration du Grand Trianon		Pierre Zimmer	France
War and Peace	Война и мир	Sergei Bondarchuk	Soviet Union

=== Short Films Competition ===
The following short films competed for the Grand Prix International du Festival:

- Crunch-crunch by Carlos Marchiori
- Dada by Greta Deses
- L'Emploi du temps by Bernard Lemoine
- Gloire à Félix Tournachon by André Martin
- Herb Alpert and the Tijuana Brass Double Feature by John Hubley
- Insitne umenie by Vlado Kubenko
- Jedan plus jedan jeste tri by Branko Ranitovic
- Larghetto by Waclaw Kondek
- Napló by György Kovásznai
- Opus by Don Levy
- Remedios Varo by Jomí García Ascot
- Sky Over Holland by John Fernhout
- La Tana by Luigi Di Gianni
- Toys by Grant Munro
- Versailles by Albert Lamorisse
- Die Widerrechtliche Ausübung der Astronomie by Peter Schamoni

== Parallel section ==
=== International Critics' Week ===
The following feature films were screened for the 6th International Critics' Week (6e Semaine de la Critique):

- The Bell (Kane) by Yukio Aoshima (Japan)
- L'Horizon by Jacques Rouffio (France)
- Jozsef Katis by Wim Verstappen (Netherlands)
- Love Affair, or the Case of the Missing Switchboard Operator (Ljubavni slučaj ili tragedija službenice P.T.T.) by Dusan Makavejev (Yugoslavia)
- The Times That Are (Le Règne du jour) by Pierre Perrault (Canada)
- Rondo by Zvonimir Berkovic (Yugoslavia)
- Trio by Gianfranco Mingozzi (Italy)
- Ukamau by Jorge Sanjinés Aramayo (Bolivia)
- Warrendale by Allan King (Canada)

== Official Awards ==
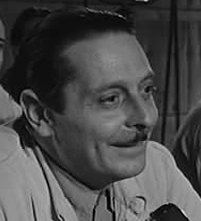
Alessandro Blasetti, Jury President

=== Main Competition ===
- Grand Prix International du Festival: Blowup by Michelangelo Antonioni
- Grand Prix Spécial du Jury:
  - Accident by Joseph Losey
  - I Even Met Happy Gypsies by Aleksandar Petrović
- Best Director: Ferenc Kósa for Ten Thousand Days
- Best Screenplay:
  - Elio Petri for We Still Kill the Old Way
  - Alain Jessua for The Killing Game
- Best Actress: Pia Degermark for Elvira Madigan
- Best Actor: Oded Kotler for Three Days and a Child
- Best First Work: The Winds of the Aures by Mohammed Lakhdar-Hamina

=== Short Films Competition ===
- Grand Prix International du Festival: Sky Over Holland by John Fernhout
- Prix spécial du Jury:
  - Gloire à Félix Tournachon by André Martin
  - Jedan plus jedan jeste tri by Branko Ranitovic
- Short film Technical Prize: Sky Over Holland by John Fernhout
  - Special Mention: Versailles by Albert Lamorisse

== Independent Awards ==
=== FIPRESCI Prize ===
- I Even Met Happy Gypsies by Aleksandar Petrović
- Entranced Earth by Glauber Rocha

=== Commission Supérieure Technique ===
- Technical Grand Prize - Special Mention: Hagbard and Signe by Gabriel Axel

=== OCIC Award ===
- Mouchette by Robert Bresson

== Media ==
- INA: Opening of the 1967 festival (commentary in French)
