= Hole in the Moon =

1964 Israeli film by Uri Zohar

- Film poster
- חור בלבנה
- Directed by: Uri Zohar
- Written by: Amos Kenan
- Produced by: Mordecai Navon
- Starring: Arik Lavie; Shaike Ophir; Avraham Heffner; Christiane Dancourt; Uri Zohar
- Cinematography: David Gurfinkel
- Edited by: Anna Gurit
- Music by: Michel Colombier
- Production company: Geva Films
- Release date: 1964
- Running time: 90 minutes
- Country: Israel
- Language: Hebrew
- Budget: $100,000

Hole in the Moon (Hebrew: חור בלבנה; Hor B'Levana) is a 1964 Israeli avant-garde-satiric movie directed by Uri Zohar. It was the first film to emerge from the New Sensibility movement in Israeli cinema.

The film comprises two parts and employs the movie within a movie structure. The title of the film derives from a famous Hebrew song (that itself is based on a Czech folk melody) and also pays tribute to Georges Méliès's film A Trip to the Moon (1902). It was Zohar's final political film and since its release has garnered the status of Israeli cinema classic.

== Plot summary ==
=== Part one ===
Two new Jewish migrants to Israel embark on an adventure following their Aliyah. The pair are from distinct parts of the Jewish Diaspora, one is Ashkenazi and from Europe, the other is Mizrahi from the Middle East. They are dispatched to start new lives in the Negev desert. They decide to create an imaginary cinematic city in the desert, fusing characters and genre from classical movies from the United States.

=== Part two ===
Following the demolition of the cardboard-constructed cinematic city, a local functionary encourages them to reconstruct the city in concrete and rooted in Zionist ideals.

== Cast ==
- Arik Lavie
- Shaike Ophir
- Avraham Heffner
- Christiane Dancourt
- Uri Zohar
- Dahn Ben Amotz
- Ze'ev Berlinsky
- Daphne Eilat
- Israel Gurion
- Shmulik Kraus
- Shoshana Shani

== Production ==
The film was heavily influenced by the French New Wave, particularly the films of Jean-Luc Godard. It was a response to the Zionist dramas of the 1950s, and satirizes the form by showing the production of one of these films. Hole in the Moon is an avant-garde film, incorporating elements of metacinema and direct commentary on narrative cinema itself.

The sculptor Igael Tumarkin was hired to design the set, with French composer Michel Colombier contributing the score.

The film includes scenes filmed at Café Kassit in Tel Aviv, where young women audition for a film role. The film also includes documentary footage.

== Release ==
The film received its world premiere in Tel Aviv in 1965. It was later screened at the 1965 Cannes Film Festival as part of International Critics' Week.

== Reception ==
Since the film's release it has attained the status of Israeli cinema classic.

In 2013, Ariel Schweitzer wrote in Haaretz that the film "sent shock waves through the local cinema scene."
