= The House on Chelouche Street =

- Film poster
- Directed by: Moshé Mizrahi
- Written by: Rachel Fabien; Yerech Guber; Moshé Mizrahi
- Produced by: Yoram Globus (executive producer); Menahem Golan (producer)
- Starring: Gila Almagor; Shaike Ophir; Yosef Shiloach
- Cinematography: Adam Greenberg
- Edited by: Dov Hoenig
- Music by: Dov Seltzer
- Release date: 1973
- Running time: 110 minutes
- Country: Israel
- Languages: Hebrew; Egyptian Arabic; Ladino

The House on Chelouche Street (Hebrew: הבית ברחוב שלוש, romanized: HaBayit b'Rechov Shalosh) is a 1973 semi-autobiographical Israeli New Sensibility film by Israeli director Moshé Mizrahi, who also co-wrote the screenplay. It was filmed in Hebrew, Egyptian Arabic and Judeo-Spanish (a.k.a. Ladino, a Jewish language mostly derived from Old Castilian). The film was nominated for the Academy Award for Best Foreign Language Film.

This is the first Israeli film whose plot is set during the British Mandate in the land of Israel.

The film is largely based on the personal biography of its creator, Moshe Mizrahi. In 1946, at the age of 15, Mizrahi immigrated to Israel from Alexandria with his widowed mother and younger brother Shabtai. They settled in Jaffa. On July 13, 1948, his nine-year-old brother was killed in an Egyptian bombing of Tel Aviv.

== Plot ==
The film tells the story of a Sephardi family of Egyptian Jewish immigrants from Alexandria that settle in 1947 Tel Aviv. The family consists of a 33-year-old widowed wife, Clara, (played by Gila Almagor, one of the most prominent actresses in Israel for the last three decades) and her four children. They live in a working-class neighborhood surrounded by their extended family, including Clara's mother Mazal, Clara's uncle Rafael, and Sultana, his wife.

The plot centers on the firstborn, Sami, his transition from a shy 15-year-old to a working man and an activist in the "Irgun" (a resistance movement that acted mainly against the military forces of the British), and the romantic attachment he develops with a 25-year-old Russian immigrant librarian (Michal Bat-Adam, now a director). In addition to this, Clara struggles between social pressure to take a husband and her own complex feelings surrounding this, complicated by another Sephardi Egyptian, played by Yosef Shiloach, who has strong feelings for her.

The film is a credible description of the lives of Sephardi immigrant families on the eve of the declaration of the state of Israel. Also covered is the escalating violence between British forces and the local populace, as well as Palestinian Arab violence towards Jews.

The music in the film is accompanied by songs performed by Shoshana Damari, the most famous of which is the closing song, "By the Light of Memories" (lyrics by Mohar, composed by Wilensky).

== Cast ==
- Gila Almagor as Clara
- Ofer Shalhin as Sami
- Michal Bat-Adam as Sonia
- Shaike Ophir as Chaim Zinger
- Yosef Shiloach as Nissim
- Avner Hizkiyahu as Rafael
- Chaim Banai as Sasson
- Yossi Polak as Max
- Misha Natan as Mr. Goldfein
- Rolf Brin as Grossman
- Eti Grotas as Sultana
- Bronka Salzman as Mazal

== See also ==
- List of submissions to the 46th Academy Awards for Best Foreign Language Film
- List of Israeli submissions for the Academy Award for Best Foreign Language Film
