= Big Eyes (1974 film) =

- Original film poster
- עיניים גדולות
- Directed by: Uri Zohar
- Written by: Yaakov Shabtai; Uri Zohar
- Produced by: Itzik Kol; Yoram Ben-Ami
- Starring: Uri Zohar; Arik Einstein; Sima Eliahu; Talia Shapira; Tzvi Shissel
- Cinematography: David Gurfinkel
- Edited by: Anna Gurit
- Music by: Miki Gavrielov
- Release date: 1974
- Running time: 81 minutes
- Country: Israel
- Language: Hebrew

Big Eyes (Hebrew: עיניים גדולות, translit. Einayim G’dolot) is a 1974 Israeli New Sensibility comedy-drama directed by Uri Zohar. It was written by Yaakov Shabtai and Zohar. It is the second of Zohar's Tel Aviv Trilogy of films, preceded by Metzitzim (Peeping Toms) (1972) and followed by Save the Lifeguard (הצילו את המציל, Hatzilu Et HaMatzil, 1977).

The film stars Zohar and long-time collaborator, Arik Einstein. It was shot in black and white.

It is the penultimate film that Zohar starred and directed in, before leaving behind an entertainment career to become a chozer b'teshuvah (returnee to religious observance) and rabbi.

== Plot summary ==
Basketball league coach, Benny Furman (Zohar) is married to Elia, a sensible woman, with whom he shares two children. However, he evades his adult responsibilities to pursue affairs with two other women, Sima and Talia. He runs around the city making deals. He attempts to instil some ambition in his closest friend, Yossi (Einstein), a player on his team. Yossi lives with his mother and spends much of his time playing chess, reading newspapers and smoking cigarettes. Meanwhile, Benny is pushing everyone in his life too far with his expectations of them and his erratic lifestyle. His wife discovers his affairs and is mostly upset by his lying. Sima, meanwhile, has become interested in Yossi.

== Cast ==
- Uri Zohar as Benny Furman, a married basketball league coach
- Arik Einstein as Yossi, Benny's best friend
- Sima Eliyahu as Sima, one of Benny's mistresses
- Elia Zohar as Elia, Benny's wife
- Talia Shapira as Talia, another mistress of Benny
- Tzvi Shissel as Katz, spoiled son of the basketball league owner, and who is dating an English immigrant, Mania
- Menashe Warshavsky as Nadel, Group Manager
- Alona Einstein as Geula, Yossi's girlfriend
- Bronka Salzman as Yossi's mother
- Ephraim Zohar as Benny and Elia's son
- Didi Lukov as Spindle, basketball player
- Michael Sadeh as Yefet
- Avigdor Tsabari as Avidgor
- Micha Sharfstein as basketball player
- Roni Busani as basketball player

== Production ==
The production again brought together Zohar and his long-term collaborator and friend, Arik Einstein. Zohar spoke about the film in the 2018 documentary, Zohar: The Return: “In the end, we played ourselves, our lives.” The character of Benny's wife is played by Zohar's real-life wife, Elia Zohar, whereas Alona Einstein, Einstein's recently-divorced wife, plays Yossi's girlfriend. Sima Eliyahu, Einstein's second wife, whom he met filming Metzitzim (1972), plays a lover of both Zohar and Einstein's characters.

== Release ==
The film was released in Israeli cinemas in 1974.

In 2020, the film was digitally restored by the Israel Film Archive. The restored version premiered at the Jerusalem Film Festival at the Jerusalem Cinematheque in 2021.

In 2024, it was screened at the Quad Cinema in New York City. It formed part of the series, "Origin Stories: Jake Paltrow’s Notes on June Zero". It was one of seven films curated by Jake Paltrow, citing them as influences on his 2024 film, June Zero.

== Reception ==
=== Critical ===
Although originally perceived as an "escapist beach comedy" in Israel, the film has since undergone a deeper critical analysis. In 2013, Dr. Ariel Schweitzer, curator of a Zohar retrospective, said that the Tel Aviv Trilogy reflects "the existential vacuum in Uri Zohar’s personal life and amid the group he was surrounded by. Over the years, some of them left their bohemian way of life in secular Tel Aviv and chose religion." Schweitzer continued: “But these films − two of which were created a little before the Yom Kippur War and the third immediately after it − are also a seismograph of Israeli society as a whole. They are a marker of the social crisis, the ideological vacuum that rose up and breached the surface immediately after that war.” “Today we see just how these films reflected the existential vacuum in Uri Zohar’s personal life and amid the group he was surrounded by. Over the years, some of them left their bohemian way of life in secular Tel Aviv and chose religion,” says Schweitzer. “But these films − two of which were created a little before the Yom Kippur War and the third immediately after it − are also a seismograph of Israeli society as a whole. They are a marker of the social crisis, the ideological vacuum that rose up and breached the surface immediately after that war.”

In 2022, Uri Misgav, writing in Haaretz, praised the film and Metzitzim as being "two of the best films ever made in Israel." Misgav continued: "Both films were written and shot from within the heart of a social scene and experience in Israel that was characterized by chauvinism, sexism and bohemianism – and they succeeded not only in documenting but also in critiquing that scene sharply, in real time and in all its abjectness." Misgav continued: "The result is that viewers are swept up into a truly stupendous cinematic journey in which they identify alternately and unceasingly with each of the characters, masculine and feminine, older and younger. There are no absolutely bad or absolutely good figures, only human beings with their vast array of virtues and foibles. But there is a clear truth hovering above all, which ultimately leaves the viewer with the bittersweet taste of the melancholy and emptiness that plague questions of human existence."

=== Recognition ===
In 2012, the Department of Film and Television at Tel Aviv University commissioned a series of short films that refer to the most important films in the history of Israeli cinema, including Big Eyes. In the short film, Sahkan Safsal (Bench Player), directed by Gil Weinstein, Assi Dayan plays three characters, including Zohar's Benny Furman. Arik Einstein's song "The Ballad of Benny Furman" is played at the end of the film.

== Themes ==
Fiammetta Martegani, an Italian-Israeli anthropologist has identified the film as a "metaphor of the post-mekhdal period". Mekhdal refers to the unreadiness of the Golda Meir government to prepare for the Yom Kippur War in October 1973. Martegani notes that film "presents the "Big Eyes" of the country, still euphoric after the Six Day War "hangover" and not able to understand the vulnerability of the state and Israeli society."

Martegani asserts that the protagonist, Benny Furman, begins to emerge as an anti-hero. She continues that through "the metaphor of the basketball match, Zohar portrays two very different male friends and characters: the married man (Benny) in conflict over remaining faithful to his wife, and the bachelor (Yossi) who desires to be a family man." Further to this "the fight to win the basketball match becomes a mirror reflecting the fight for love, jealousy, and the ambivalence in human relationships."
