= Every Bastard a King =

1968 film

- Directed by: Uri Zohar
- Written by: Eli Tavor; Uri Zohar
- Produced by: Avraham Deshe; Topol
- Starring: Yehoram Gaon
- Cinematography: David Gurfinkel
- Music by: Michel Colombier
- Release date: 17 July 1968
- Running time: 100 minutes
- Country: Israel
- Language: Hebrew

Every Bastard a King (Hebrew: כל ממזר מלך, translit. Kol Mamzer Melech) is a 1968 Israeli drama film directed and co-written by Uri Zohar. The film was selected as the Israeli entry for the Best Foreign Language Film at the 41st Academy Awards, but was not accepted as a nominee.

== Plot ==
The story focuses on an American reporter who visits Israel with his girlfriend. While there, he becomes friendly with the Arabs and Israelis. Before long things change and he soon learns that war will break out. The film is set just before the Six-Day War of 1967.

== Cast ==
- Yehoram Gaon as Yoram
- Oded Kotler as Raphi Cohen
- Pier Angeli as Eileen
- William Berger as Roy Hemmings
- Ori Levy as Foreign Office Official (as Uri Levy)
- Reuven Morgan as The Photographer
- Ariela Shavid as Anat

== Reception ==
The film was a commercial and critical success. It became one of the most successful box office hits in Israeli cinema history. It was seen by an estimated 743,000 people.

In Haolam Hazeh, the critic wrote: "Finally: a movie, not another Israeli movie, but simply a movie." Natan Gross, writing in Al Hamishmar: "The audience leaves the theater filled with amazement, thrilled and excited. The critics leave singing the praises of the direction, the cinematography, the editing and the dialogue, all thanks to the fact that the film is truly brilliant."

== See also ==
- List of submissions to the 41st Academy Awards for Best Foreign Language Film
- List of Israeli submissions for the Academy Award for Best Foreign Language Film
