= Talia Shapira =

Israeli actress (1946–1992)

- טליה שפירא
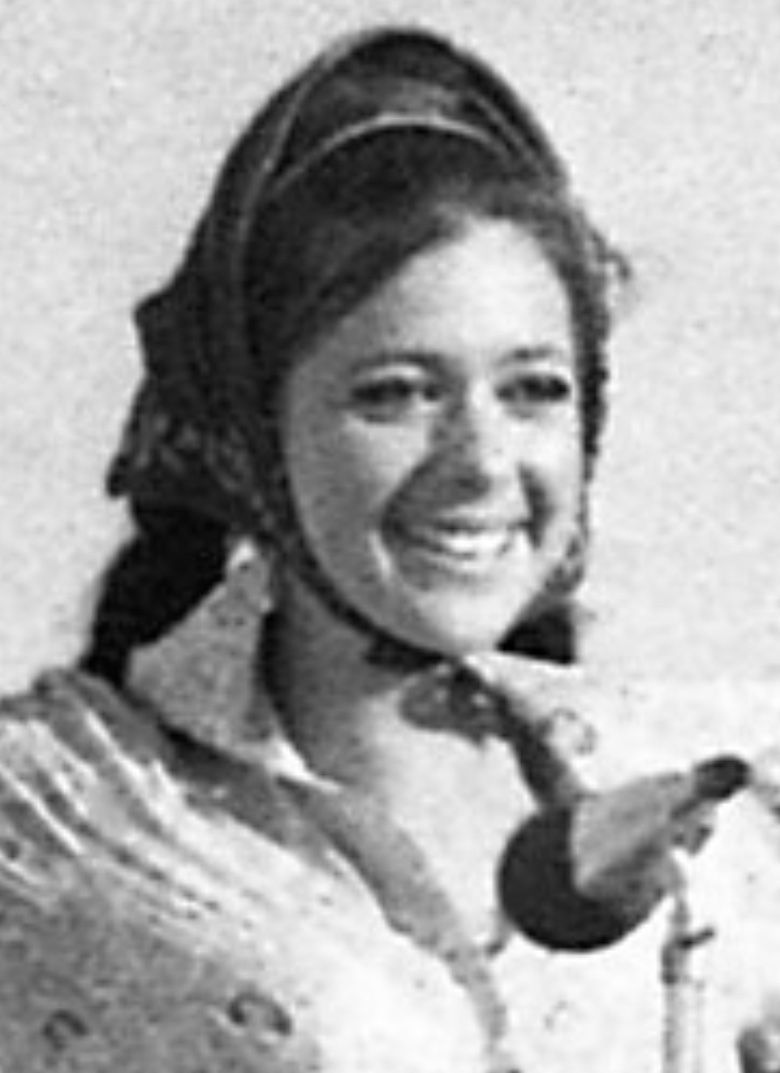
- Shapira in 1968
- Born: 6 August 1946; Ramat Gan, Mandatory Palestine
- Died: 24 January 1992 (aged 45); Tel Aviv, Israel
- Occupations: Actress; singer; comedian; writer
- Years active: 1967–1992
- Children: 2

Talia Shapira (Hebrew: טליה שפירא; 6 August 1946 – 24 January 1992) was an Israeli actress, singer, comedian and writer.

== Biography ==
Shapira was born in Ramat Gan. Her father was an electrician and her mother was a painter who died of cancer when Shapira was 16 years old. She studied at Renanim School of the Arts. After graduating, she joined up with the military band in the IDF and she performed at the Orna Porat Children's Theatre, the Haifa Theatre and the Cameri Theatre.

On screen, Shapira was known for her roles in films, including Einayim Gdolot (1974), Hagiga LaEinayim (1975), Hagiga B'Snuker (1975), Belfer (1978) and more. She was also a comedian and performer during the late 1980s and early 1990s, with a popular one-woman show and many appearances at the Saturday night show on the Israeli Channel One.

In 1975, Shapira won Actress of the Year award at the Zefat Film Festival for Hagiga LaEinayim.

=== Personal life ===
Shapira was married twice and she had two children. Her eldest son Yoni, was a founding member of the grunge band Zikney Tzfat.

== Death ==
Shapira died following a five-year battle with cancer in Tel Aviv on January 24, 1992, at the age of 45. She was buried at Kiryat Shaul Cemetery.

== Filmography ==
| Year | Title | Role | Notes |
|---|---|---|---|
| 1967 | Ervinka | Steiner's secretary | |
| 1973 | Ha-Balash Ha'Amitz Shvartz | | |
| 1974 | Big Eyes (Einayim G'dolot) | Talia | |
| 1975 | Hagiga Le'enayim | | |
| 1975 | Hagiga B'Snuker | Riki | |
| 1976 | Lupo B'New York | Teacher | |
| 1976 | Eizeh Yofi Shel Tzarot! | Dina Zilberman | |
| 1977 | Seret V'Aruhat Boker | | |
| 1978 | Belfer | | |
| 1979 | Jesus | Mary Magdalene | |
| 1980 | Transit | | |
| 1980 | Monolog shel isha tseira | | |
| 1981 | Lo L'Shidur | | |
| 1988 | Lool | | |
| 1992 | Tel Aviv Stories | Boutique owner | (final film role) |
