= Menahem Golan =

Israeli film director and producer (1929–2014)

- מנחם גולן
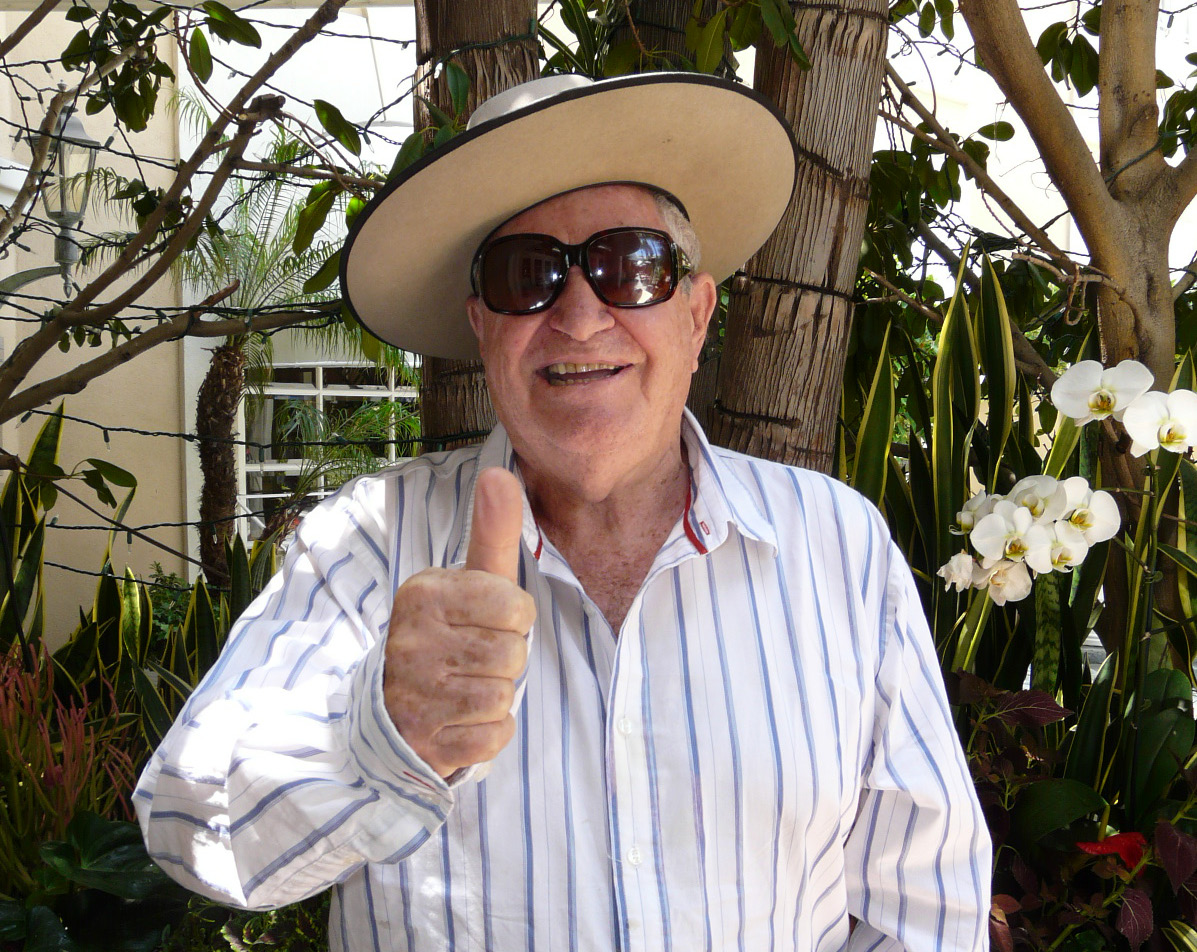
- Born: Menachem Globus; 31 May 1929; Tiberias, Mandatory Palestine, now Israel
- Died: 8 August 2014 (aged 85); Jaffa, Israel
- Other name: Joseph Goldman
- Occupations: Film director; film producer; screenwriter
- Known for: Founder of Golan-Globus/The Cannon Group
- Spouse: Rachel Golan
- Children: 3

Menahem Golan (Hebrew: מנחם גולן; 31 May 1929 – 8 August 2014, originally Menachem Globus) was an Israeli film producer, screenwriter, and director. He co-owned The Cannon Group with his cousin Yoram Globus. Cannon specialized in producing low-to-mid-budget American films, primarily genre films, during the 1980s after Golan and Globus had achieved significant filmmaking success in Israel during the 1970s.

Golan produced films featuring actors such as Sean Connery, Sylvester Stallone, Chuck Norris, Jean-Claude Van Damme, and Charles Bronson, and for a period, was known as a producer of comic book-style films like Masters of the Universe, Superman IV: The Quest for Peace, Captain America, and his aborted attempt to bring Spider-Man to the silver screen. Golan also wrote and polished numerous film scripts under the pen name Joseph Goldman. At the time of his death, Golan had produced over 200 films, directed 44, and won 8 "Kinor David" awards as well as "Israel Prize" in Cinema. He was nominated for a BAFTA Award for Best Foreign-Language Film for Franco Zeffirelli's Otello.

== Early life ==
Born Menachem Globus in Tiberias in then British Mandate of Palestine, his parents were Jewish emigrants from the Russian Empire. He spent his early years in Tiberias, then studied directing at the Old Vic School and the London Academy of Music and Dramatic Art, and filmmaking at New York University. During the 1948 Palestine war, Golan served as a pilot in the Israeli Air Force.

== Film career ==
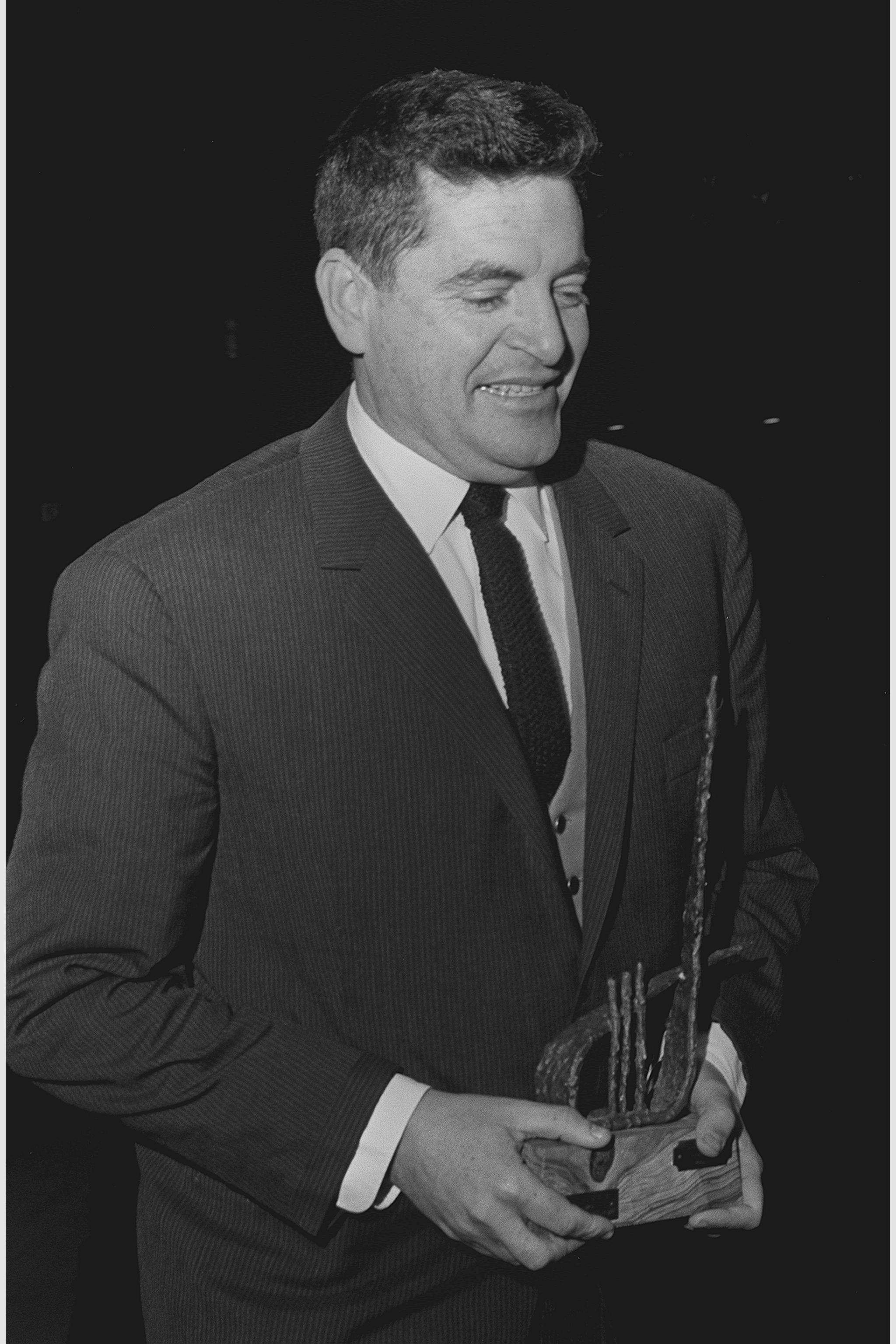
Menahem Golan awarded Kinor David 1964

Golan started as an apprentice at Habima Theater in Tel Aviv. After completing his studies in theater direction, he staged plays in Israel. He gained experience as a filmmaker by working as an assistant to Roger Corman.

Golan is probably best known as a director for his film Operation Thunderbolt (Mivtsa Yonatan, 1977), about the Israeli raid on Entebbe airport in Uganda. He also produced Eskimo Limon (Lemon Popsicle, 1978), a film that spawned many sequels and an American remake, The Last American Virgin (1982).

An adaptation of the Isaac Bashevis Singer novel The Magician of Lublin (1979) was followed by the musical The Apple (1980). An unusual moral fable with a rock-disco soundtrack, The Apple routinely appears on lists of all-time-worst movies, earning it cult film status.

Golan's production company The Cannon Group produced a long line of films during the 1980s and early 1990s, including Delta Force, Runaway Train, and some of the Death Wish sequels. In 1986, Cannon was taken over by Pathe Communications. Golan produced several comic book-style movies in the last half of the 1980s, most notably Masters of the Universe, based on the Mattel toy line of the same name and inspired by the comics of Jack Kirby. In 1987, Cannon gained infamy after its UK-based production of Superman IV: The Quest for Peace performed poorly at the box office, received mixed to negative reviews from critics and provoked a negative backlash from fans. Golan resigned from Cannon in 1989, and by 1993 the company had folded. After Cannon's collapse, Golan became head of 21st Century Film Corporation and produced several low to medium-budget films.

Golan planned to shoot Spider-Man: The Movie in 1986 at both Elstree Studios in Hertfordshire in the United Kingdom and on location in Tel Aviv, Israel. Dolph Lundgren, who played He-Man in Masters of the Universe was envisioned for the role of the Green Goblin, and Spider-Man co-creator Stan Lee was approached to make a cameo appearance in the film as J. Jonah Jameson. Golan struggled for years to produce the film and finally failed when 21st Century Film Corporation filed for bankruptcy and closed its doors in 1996 (along with Carolco Pictures, another company that had agreed to help finance the film). Sony Pictures eventually purchased the rights to the Marvel Comics character and released a Spider-Man film in 2002, directed by Sam Raimi. That year, Golan released his adaptation of Crime and Punishment.

== Personal life ==
Golan was married to Rachel (1930–2015), a makeup artist. Together, they had three daughters, clinical psychologist and psychoanalyst Ruth Golan (born 1953), Naomi (1958–2015) and Yael (born 1964). His cousin was Israeli-American producer Yoram Globus.

== Death ==
Whilst visiting Jaffa, Tel Aviv, with family members on the morning of 8 August 2014, Golan collapsed. He lost consciousness, and attempts to resuscitate him failed. He was 85 years old.

== Filmography ==
| Year | Title | Director | Writer | Producer | Notes |
|---|---|---|---|---|---|
| 1963 | El Dorado | Yes | Yes | No | |
| 1964 | Sallah Shabati | No | Yes | Yes | Golden Globe Award for Best Foreign Language Film; Nominated-Academy Award for Best International Feature Film |
| 1964 | Eight in the Footstep of One | Yes | No | Yes | (original title: Shemona B'Ekevot Ahat) |
| 1964 | Dalia and the Sailors | Yes | No | No | (original title: Dalia Vehamalahim) |
| 1965 | Trunk to Cairo | Yes | No | Yes | (original title: Einer spielt falsch |
| 1966 | Fortuna | Yes | Yes | Yes | (English title: Seduced in Sodom) |
| 1967 | Aliza Mizrahi | Yes | Yes | Yes | (English title: 999 Aliza: The Policeman) |
| 1968 | Tevye and His Seven Daughters | Yes | Yes | Yes | |
| 1968 | Topele | Yes | No | Yes | (original title: Nes B'Ayara) |
| 1968 | Commandos | No | Story | No | |
| 1969 | What's Good for the Goose | Yes | Yes | No | |
| 1969 | My Margo | Yes | Yes | Yes | (original title: Margo Sheli) |
| 1970 | Lupo! | Yes | Yes | Yes | |
| 1970 | Attack at Dawn | Yes | Yes | Yes | (original title: Ha-Pritza Hagdola) |
| 1971 | The Highway Queen | Yes | Yes | Yes | |
| 1971 | The Contract | Yes | Yes | No | (original title: Katz V'Carasso) |
| 1972 | Escape to the Sun | Yes | Yes | Yes | |
| 1972 | The Great Telephone Robbery | Yes | Yes | No | (original title: Shod Hatelephonim Hagadol) |
| 1973 | Kazablan | Yes | Yes | Yes | |
| 1975 | Diamonds | Yes | Yes | Yes | |
| 1975 | Lepke | Yes | No | Yes | |
| 1977 | Operation Thunderbolt | Yes | Yes | Yes | Nominated Academy Award for Best International Feature Film |
| 1977 | Kid Vengeance | No | No | Yes | |
| 1978 | The Uranium Conspiracy | Yes | No | Yes | |
| 1979 | The Magician of Lublin | Yes | Yes | Yes | |
| 1980 | The Apple | Yes | Yes | Yes | |
| 1981 | Enter the Ninja | Yes | Yes | Yes | |
| 1983 | Revenge of the Ninja | No | Story | Yes | |
| 1984 | Over the Brooklyn Bridge | Yes | No | Yes | |
| 1984 | Sahara | No | Story | Yes | |
| 1985 | Hot Chili | No | Yes | Yes | Screenplay credited as "Joseph Goldman" |
| 1986 | The Delta Force | Yes | Yes | Yes | |
| 1987 | Million Dollar Madness | No | Yes | Yes | |
| 1987 | Over the Top | Yes | No | Yes | |
| 1988 | Going Bananas | No | Yes | Yes | |
| 1988 | Hanna's War | Yes | Yes | Yes | |
| 1989 | Kinjite: Forbidden Subjects | No | Yes | Executive | |
| 1989 | Mack the Knife | Yes | Yes | Executive | |
| 1992 | Hit the Dutchman | Yes | Yes | Yes | |
| 1993 | Silent Victim | Yes | No | Yes | |
| 1993 | Deadly Heroes | Yes | Yes | No | |
| 1995 | Russian Roulette: Moscow 95 | Yes | No | No | |
| 1995 | Luise and the Jackpot | Yes | No | No | |
| 1996 | Superbrain | Yes | No | No | |
| 1998 | Armstrong | Yes | Yes | Yes | |
| 1998 | The Versace Murder | Yes | Yes | No | |
| 1999 | Lima: Breaking the Silence | Yes | Yes | Yes | |
| 2001 | Death Game | Yes | No | Yes | |
| 2002 | Crime and Punishment | Yes | Yes | Yes | |
| 2002 | Return from India | Yes | No | Yes | |
| 2003 | Final Combat | Yes | Yes | Yes | |
| 2005 | Days of Love | Yes | Yes | Yes | |
| 2007 | Children of Wax | No | Yes | Yes | |
| 2007 | A Dangerous Dance | Yes | Yes | Yes | |
| 2008 | Marriage Arrangement | Yes | Yes | Yes | |
| 2009 | Oy Vey! My Son Is Gay!! | No | Yes | No | |

=== Producer only ===
| Year | Title | Director | Notes |
|---|---|---|---|
| 1972 | I Love You Rosa | Moshé Mizrahi | Nominated Academy Award for Best International Feature Film |
| 1973 | The House on Chelouche Street | Moshé Mizrahi | Nominated Academy Award for Best International Feature Film |
| 1973 | Daughters, Daughters | Moshé Mizrahi | (original title: Abu el Banat) |
| 1975 | The Four Deuces | William H. Bushnell | |
| 1976 | Tzanani Family | Boaz Davidson | (original title: Mishpahat Tzan'ani) |
| 1976 | Lupo Goes to New York | Boaz Davidson | |
| 1976 | God's Gun | Gianfranco Parolini | (original title: Diamante Lobo) |
| 1978 | Lemon Popsicle | Boaz Davidson | |
| 1978 | The Alaska Wilderness Adventure | Fred Meader | |
| 1978 | It's a Funny, Funny World | Tzvi Shissel | (original title: Yisraelim Matzhikim) |
| 1979 | The Swap | Jordan Leondopoulos | Re-edited from Sam's Song |
| 1979 | Lemon Popsicle 2: Going Steady | Boaz Davidson | |
| 1979 | My Mother the General | Joel Silberg | |
| 1979 | Marriage Tel Aviv Style | Joel Silberg | (original title: Nisuin Nusah Tel Aviv) |
| 1980 | The Happy Hooker Goes Hollywood | Alan Roberts | |
| 1980 | Schizoid | David Paulsen | |
| 1980 | Seed of Innocence | Boaz Davidson | |
| 1980 | Dr. Heckyl and Mr. Hype | Charles B. Griffith | |
| 1980 | New Year's Evil | Emmett Alston | |
| 1981 | Hot Bubblegum: Lemon Popsicle 3 | Boaz Davidson | |
| 1981 | Deathhouse | Theodore Gershuny | |
| 1981 | Body and Soul | George Bowers | |
| 1981 | Hospital Massacre | Boaz Davidson | |
| 1982 | Private Popsicle: Lemon Popsicle 4 | Boaz Davidson | |
| 1982 | Death Wish II | Michael Winner | |
| 1982 | The Last American Virgin | Boaz Davidson | |
| 1982 | Mute Love | Joel Silberg | |
| 1983 | Private Manoeuvres | Tzvi Shissel | |
| 1983 | Nana, the True Key of Pleasure | Dan Wolman | |
| 1983 | House of the Long Shadows | Pete Walker | |
| 1983 | Hercules | Luigi Cozzi | |
| 1983 | Young Warriors | Lawrence D. Foldes | |
| 1983 | The Wicked Lady | Michael Winner | |
| 1984 | Baby Love: Lemon Popsicle 5 | Dan Wolman | |
| 1984 | The Big Tease: Here Comes Another One | Yehuda Barkan; Yigal Shilon | |
| 1984 | Breakin' | Joel Silberg | |
| 1984 | Night Soldier | Dan Wolman | |
| 1984 | The Naked Face | Bryan Forbes | |
| 1984 | I'm Almost Not Crazy: John Cassavetes, the Man and His Work | Michael Ventura | |
| 1984 | Sword of the Valiant | Stephen Weeks | |
| 1984 | Love Streams | John Cassavetes | |
| 1984 | Ninja III: The Domination | Sam Firstenberg | |
| 1984 | Forced Testimony | Raphael Rebibo | |
| 1984 | Missing in Action | Joseph Zito | |
| 1984 | Breakin' 2: Electric Boogaloo | Sam Firstenberg | |
| 1985 | Up Your Anchor: Lemon Popsicle 6 | Dan Wolman | |
| 1985 | Hot Resort | John Robins | |
| 1985 | The Ambassador | J. Lee Thompson | |
| 1985 | Missing in Action 2: The Beginning | Lance Hool | |
| 1985 | Déjà Vu | Anthony B. Richmond | |
| 1985 | The Assisi Underground | Alexander Ramati | |
| 1985 | Rappin' | Joel Silberg | |
| 1985 | Grace Quigley | Anthony Harvey | |
| 1985 | Lifeforce | Tobe Hooper | |
| 1985 | Salomè | Claude d'Anna | |
| 1985 | American Ninja | Sam Firstenberg | |
| 1985 | Hard Rock Zombies | Krishna Shah | |
| 1985 | War and Love | Moshé Mizrahi | |
| 1985 | Invasion U.S.A. | Joseph Zito | |
| 1985 | The Adventures of Hercules | Luigi Cozzi | |
| 1985 | The Berlin Affair | Liliana Cavani | |
| 1985 | Death Wish 3 | Michael Winner | |
| 1985 | King Solomon's Mines | J. Lee Thompson | |
| 1985 | Aladdin | Bruno Corbucci | |
| 1985 | Fool for Love | Robert Altman | |
| 1985 | Runaway Train | Andrei Konchalovsky | |
| 1986 | The Lover | Michal Bat-Adam | |
| 1986 | Camorra (A Story of Streets, Women and Crime) | Lina Wertmüller | |
| 1986 | Field of Honor | Kim Dae-hie; Hans Scheepmaker | |
| 1986 | America 3000 | David Engelbach | |
| 1986 | P.O.W. the Escape | Gideon Amir | |
| 1986 | Pirates | Roman Polanski | |
| 1986 | Cobra | George P. Cosmatos | |
| 1986 | Invaders from Mars | Tobe Hooper | |
| 1986 | Lightning, the White Stallion | William A. Levey | |
| 1986 | Detective School Dropouts | Filippo Ottoni | |
| 1986 | The Texas Chainsaw Massacre 2 | Tobe Hooper | |
| 1986 | Otello | Franco Zeffirelli | |
| 1986 | Avenging Force | Sam Firstenberg | |
| 1986 | 52 Pick-Up | John Frankenheimer | |
| 1986 | Castaway | Nicolas Roeg | |
| 1986 | Firewalker | J. Lee Thompson | |
| 1986 | Duet for One | Andrei Konchalovsky | |
| 1987 | Young Love: Lemon Popsicle 7 | Walter Bannert | |
| 1987 | Dutch Treat | Boaz Davidson | |
| 1987 | Allan Quatermain and the Lost City of Gold | Gary Nelson | |
| 1987 | Number One with a Bullet | Jack Smight | |
| 1987 | The Barbarians | Ruggero Deodato | |
| 1987 | Down Twisted | Albert Pyun | |
| 1987 | Street Smart | Jerry Schatzberg | |
| 1987 | The Hanoi Hilton | Lionel Chetwynd | |
| 1987 | Beauty and the Beast | Eugene Marner | |
| 1987 | Rumpelstiltskin | David Irving | |
| 1987 | American Ninja 2: The Confrontation | Sam Firstenberg | |
| 1987 | The Emperor's New Clothes | David Irving | |
| 1987 | Too Much | Éric Rochat | |
| 1987 | Three Kinds of Heat | Leslie Stevens | |
| 1987 | Sleeping Beauty | David Irving | |
| 1987 | Superman IV: The Quest for Peace | Sidney J. Furie | |
| 1987 | Masters of the Universe | Gary Goddard | |
| 1987 | Penitentiary III | Jamaa Fanaka | |
| 1987 | King Lear | Jean-Luc Godard | |
| 1987 | Tough Guys Don't Dance | Norman Mailer | |
| 1987 | Dancers | Herbert Ross | |
| 1987 | Business as Usual | Lezli-An Barrett | |
| 1987 | Under Cover | John Stockwell | |
| 1988 | Summertime Blues: Lemon Popsicle VIII | Reinhard Schwabenitzky | |
| 1988 | Braddock: Missing in Action III | Aaron Norris | |
| 1988 | Alien from L.A. | Albert Pyun | |
| 1988 | Bloodsport | Newt Arnold | |
| 1988 | Shy People | Andrei Konchalovsky | |
| 1988 | Salsa | Boaz Davidson | |
| 1988 | The Frog Prince | Jackson Hunsicker | |
| 1988 | Puss in Boots | Eugene Marner | |
| 1988 | Journey to the Center of the Earth | Rusty Lemorande; Albert Pyun | |
| 1988 | Messenger of Death | J. Lee Thompson | |
| 1988 | Doin' Time on Planet Earth | Charles Matthau | |
| 1988 | Platoon Leader | Aaron Norris | |
| 1988 | Evil Angels | Fred Schepisi | |
| 1988 | Hansel and Gretel | Len Talan | |
| 1989 | Snow White | Michael Berz | |
| 1989 | Manifesto | Dušan Makavejev | |
| 1989 | Red Riding Hood | Adam Brooks | |
| 1989 | Cyborg | Albert Pyun | |
| 1990 | Captain America | Albert Pyun | |
| 1992 | The Finest Hour | Shimon Dotan | |
| 1992 | Mad Dog Coll | Greydon Clark | |
| 1992 | Dance Macabre | Greydon Clark | |

=== Executive producer only ===
| Year | Title | Director | Notes |
|---|---|---|---|
| 1976 | The Passover Plot | Michael Campus | |
| 1980 | The Godsend | Gabrielle Beaumont | |
| 1982 | Lady Chatterley's Lover | Just Jaeckin | |
| 1982 | That Championship Season | Jason Miller | |
| 1983 | The Seven Magnificent Gladiators | Bruno Mattei | |
| 1983 | Treasure of the Four Crowns | Ferdinando Baldi | |
| 1983 | One More Chance | Sam Firstenberg | |
| 1983 | 10 to Midnight | J. Lee Thompson | |
| 1984 | Making the Grade | Dorian Walker | |
| 1984 | Ordeal by Innocence | Desmond Davis | |
| 1984 | Bolero | John Derek | |
| 1985 | Exterminator 2 | Mark Buntzman | |
| 1985 | Maria's Lovers | Andrei Konchalovsky | |
| 1985 | Thunder Alley | J. S. Cardone | |
| 1985 | Mata Hari | Curtis Harrington | |
| 1986 | The Naked Cage | Paul Nicholas | |
| 1986 | Murphy's Law | J. Lee Thompson | |
| 1986 | Dangerously Close | Albert Pyun | |
| 1987 | Assassination | Peter R. Hunt | |
| 1987 | The Assault | Fons Rademakers | |
| 1987 | Diary of a Mad Old Man | Lili Rademakers | |
| 1987 | Mascara | Patrick Conrad | |
| 1987 | Surrender | Jerry Belson | |
| 1987 | Barfly | Barbet Schroeder | |
| 1987 | Death Wish 4: The Crackdown | J. Lee Thompson | |
| 1988 | Appointment with Death | Michael Winner | |
| 1988 | Powaqqatsi: Life in Transformation | Godfrey Reggio | |
| 1988 | Hero and the Terror | William Tannen | |
| 1988 | Haunted Summer | Ivan Passer | |
| 1989 | Caged Fury | Bill Milling | |
| 1989 | Masque of the Red Death | Alan Birkinshaw | |
| 1989 | The Black Cat | Luigi Cozzi | |
| 1990 | Night of the Living Dead | Tom Savini | |
| 1990 | The Forbidden Dance | Greydon Clark | Also story writer |
| 1990 | Bad Jim | Clyde Ware | |
| 1990 | The Appointed | Daniel Wachsmann | |
| 1990 | The 5th Monkey | Éric Rochat | |
| 1990 | Bullseye! | Michael Winner | |
| 1991 | Naked Robot 4 1/2 | Philip J. Cook | |
| 1991 | Virgin High | Richard Gabai | |
| 1991 | Killing Streets | Stephen Cornwell | Also story writer |
| 1992 | Hot Under the Collar | Richard Gabai | |
| 1992 | Desert Kickboxer | Isaac Florentine | |
| 1993 | Three Days to a Kill | Fred Williamson | |
| 1993 | Midnight Witness | Peter Foldy | |
| 1993 | Rage | Anthony Maharaj | |
| 1993 | Emmanuelle 7 | Francis Leroi | |
| 1993 | Teenage Bonnie and Klepto Clyde | John Shepphird | |
| 1993 | Dead Center | Steve Carver | Also story writer |
| 1994 | Death Wish V: The Face of Death | Allan A. Goldstein | |
| 1994 | Stickfighter | BJ Davis | |
| 1999 | Speedway Junky | Nickolas Perry | |

== Awards and recognition ==
- 1978: Nomination for the Academy Award for Best Foreign Language Film Operation Thunderbolt
- 1984: Won the Golden Raspberry Award for Worst Picture Bolero
- 1986: Nomination for Golden Raspberry Award for Worst Picture Cobra
- 1987: Nomination for Golden Raspberry Award for Worst Picture Tough Guys don't dance
- In 1999, Golan was awarded the Israel Prize for his contribution to cinema.
- In 1994 Golan was awarded the Ophir Prize of the Israeli Film Academy for his Lifetime Achievement.
- The movie theater in the Azrieli building in Tel Aviv bore the name of the Golan-Globus company. It was closed in 2008.

== See also ==
- List of Israel Prize recipients
- Cinema of Israel
