= Three Days and a Child =

1967 film

- Film poster
- Directed by: Uri Zohar
- Written by: Dahn Ben Amotz; Uri Zohar; Amatsia Hiuni
- Produced by: Amatsia Hiuni
- Starring: Oded Kotler
- Cinematography: David Gurfinkel
- Edited by: Jacques Ehrlich
- Music by: Dov Seltzer
- Distributed by: Ergo Media (US)
- Release date: 1967
- Running time: 90 minutes
- Country: Israel
- Language: Hebrew

Three Days and a Child (Hebrew: שלושה ימים וילד, translit. Shlosha Yamim Veyeled) is a 1967 Israeli New Sensibility drama film directed and co-written by Uri Zohar.

It is a modernist adaptation of a short story of the same name by A. B. Yehoshua and draws on the techniques and sensibilities of French New Wave cinema.

== Plot ==
Eli (Oded Kotler) is a young graduate student in math who lives with his girlfriend in Jerusalem. He agrees to babysit Shai (Shai Oshorov), the young son of his beloved former girlfriend, Noa (Judith Solé), and her husband. Eli and Shai spend three days touring Jerusalem, as Eli relives painful memories of his life with Noa on the kibbutz and her subsequent rejection of him. Uncertain if he is the child's father, Eli's feelings towards Shay are ambivalent and for unexplained reasons (perhaps resentment, anger, jealousy, alienation, boredom, or guilt) he plays dangerous games with the boy.

== Cast ==
- Oded Kotler - Eli
- Shai Oshorov - Shai
- Judith Solé - Noa
- Misha Asherov - Shai's father
- Illi Gorlitzky - Zvi
- Germaine Unikovsky - Yael (as Jermain Unikovsky)
- Stella Ivni - Neighbor
- Baruch David - Neighbor's husband
- Shoshana Doar - Yael's mother
- Nissan Yatir - Yael's father

== Themes ==
According to one student of Israeli film, Three Days and a Child "ostensibly . . .sets up a dichotomy between [Eli's] alienated life in Jerusalem and the kibbutz idyll. His life in the city is characterized by loneliness, despair, estrangement from his lover and a mise-en-scène that stresses desolation, graves and thorns. In the hero’s consciousness, his kibbutz past is a memory of first love, flowering fields and flowing water. Yet . . . this perception of the protagonist is not so clear cut: life in the kibbutz wasn’t so harmonious, whereas his life in Jerusalem was not so terrible."

== Critical reception ==
Three Days and a Child was a great success, critically and commercially, selling some 308,000 tickets. It was entered into the 1967 Cannes Film Festival where it was nominated for Best Film and Oded Kotler won the award for Best Actor.
