= David Gurfinkel =

Israeli cinematographer (born 1938)

- דוד גרפינקל
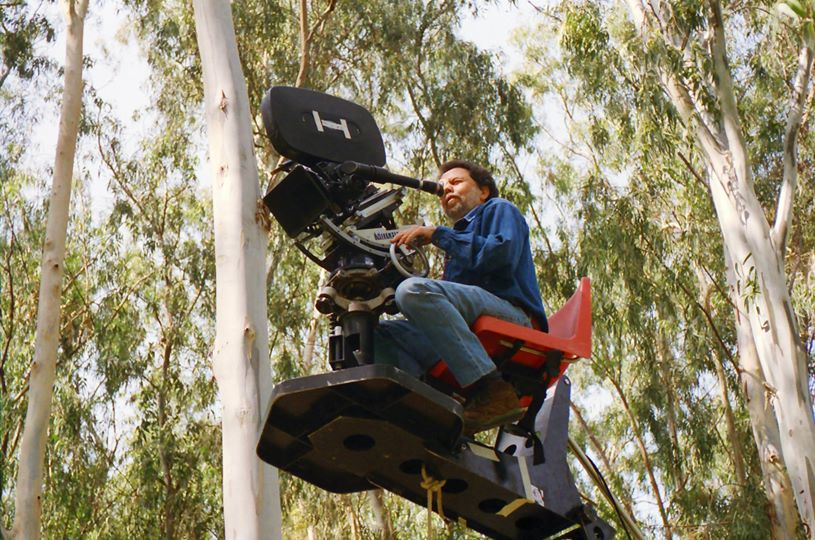
- David Gurfinkel
- Born: 12 December 1938 (age 87); Tel Aviv, Mandatory Palestine
- Occupation: Cinematographer
- Known for: Award-winning cinematography
- Children: Jonathan Gurfinkel
- Awards: Israel Prize (2015)

David Gurfinkel (Hebrew: דוד גרפינקל; born December 12, 1938, in Tel Aviv) is an Israeli cinematographer. In 2015 he was awarded the Israel Prize for cinema.

He is the father of filmmaker Jonathan Gurfinkel.

== Selected filmography ==
- The Policeman (1971)
- Fifty-Fifty (1971)
- Big Eyes (1974)
- Hagiga B'Snuker (1975)
- The Magician of Lublin (1979)
- The Apple (1980)
- Enter the Ninja (1981)
- Revenge of the Ninja (1983)
- The Naked Face (1984)
- The Delta Force (1986)
- Over the Top (1987)
- Appointment With Death (1988)
- A Man Called Sarge (1990)
- Cover-Up (1990)
- Teenage Mutant Ninja Turtles III (1993)
- The Last Patrol (2000)
- Nina's Tragedies (2003)
