= Tzvi Shissel =

Israeli actor (1946–2021)

- צבי שיסל
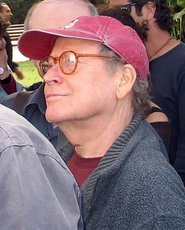
- Shissel attending the funeral service of Eli Mohar in 2006
- Born: 15 July 1946; Tel Aviv, Mandatory Palestine
- Died: 28 July 2021 (aged 75); Tel Aviv, Israel
- Other name: Zvi Shissel
- Occupations: Actor; director; producer; screenwriter
- Years active: 1968–2021
- Children: 2

Tzvi Shissel (Hebrew: צבי שיסל; 15 July 1946 – 28 July 2021) was an Israeli actor, film and television producer, screenwriter, and film director.

Schissel was born in Tel Aviv and served in the Armored Corps Band of the IDF. After the military discharge he started acting in films including Fifty-Fifty and later filmmaking. He was part of the comedy group Havurat Lul ("Chicken coop group"), which, among others, included Uri Zohar and Arik Einstein.

During 1980-1987 Shissel worked in the United States.

He died at the Ichilov Hospital due to systemic collapse developed from food poisoning, leaving behind his wife and two sons. His family sued the hospital claiming negligence.

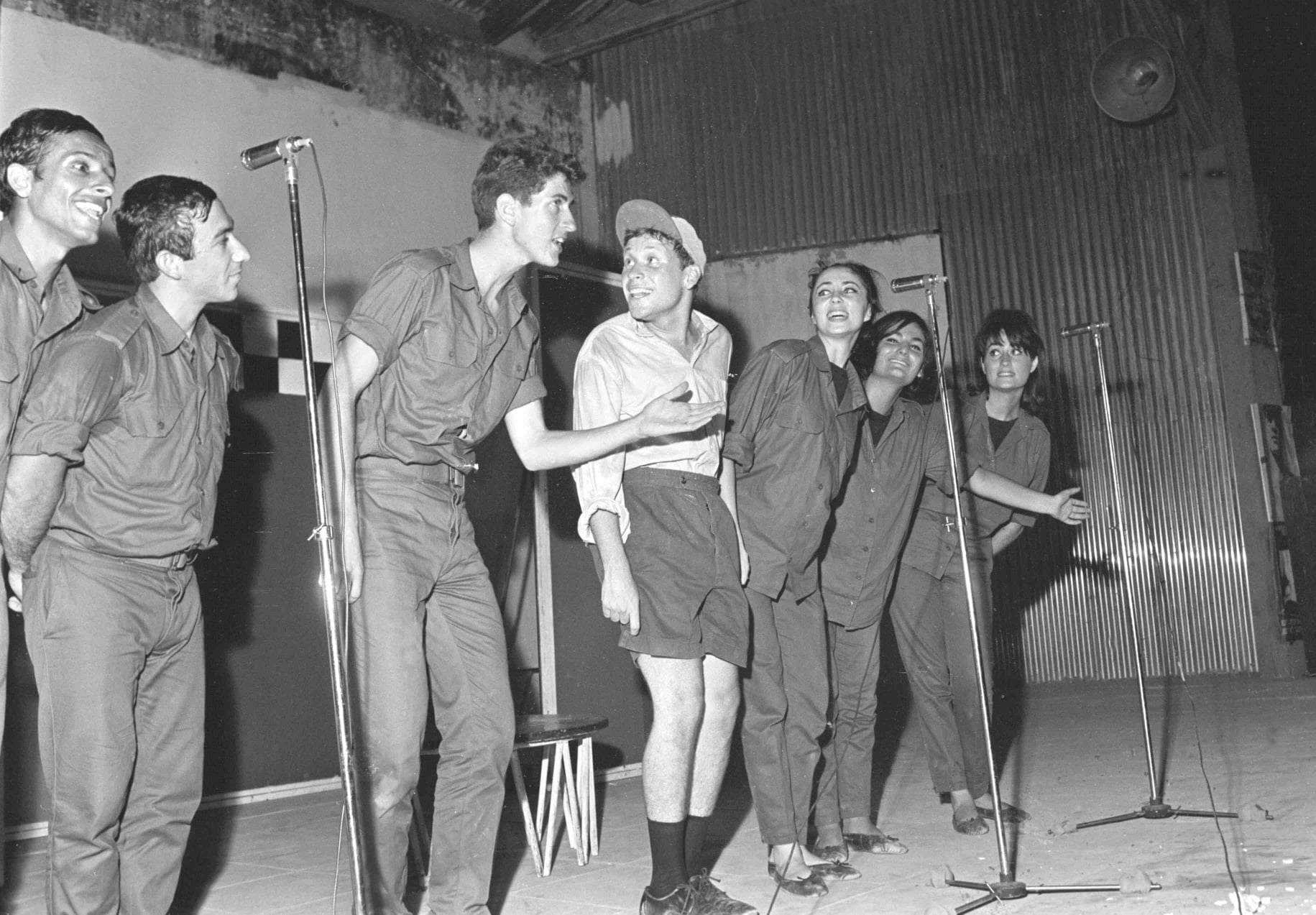
Shissel performs as part of the Armored Corps Band, 1966
