= Avner Hizkiyahu =

Israeli actor (1926–1994)

- אבנר חזקיהו
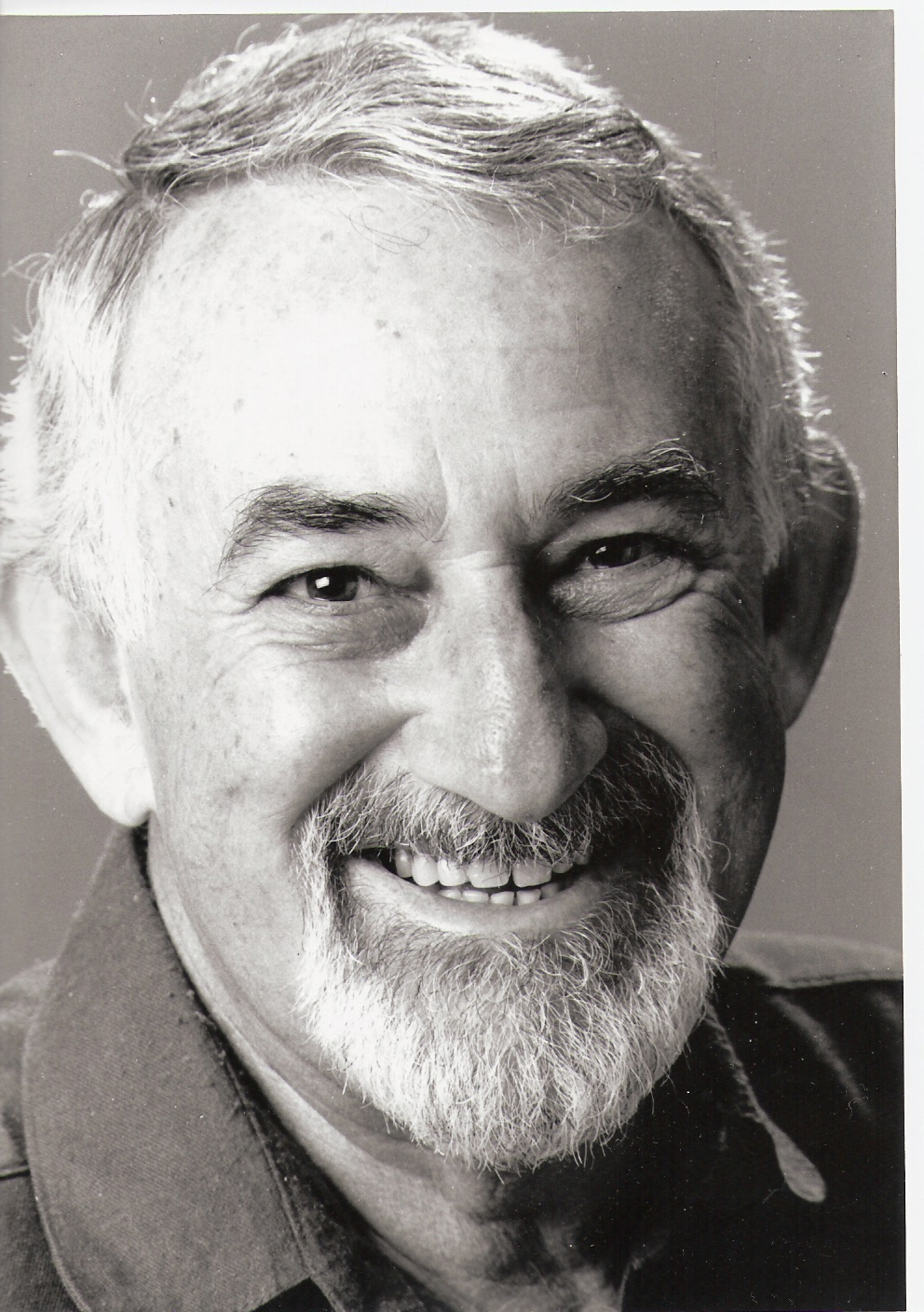
- Born: 22 November 1926; Kazanlak, Bulgaria
- Died: 28 April 1994 (aged 67); Tel Aviv, Israel
- Other name: Avner Chizkiyahu
- Occupations: Actor; singer
- Years active: 1949–1994
- Children: 1

Avner Hizkiyahu (Hebrew: אבנר חזקיהו; 22 November 1926 – 28 April 1994) was an Israeli actor and singer.
