= Oded Kotler =

Israeli actor and theatre director

- עודד קוטלר
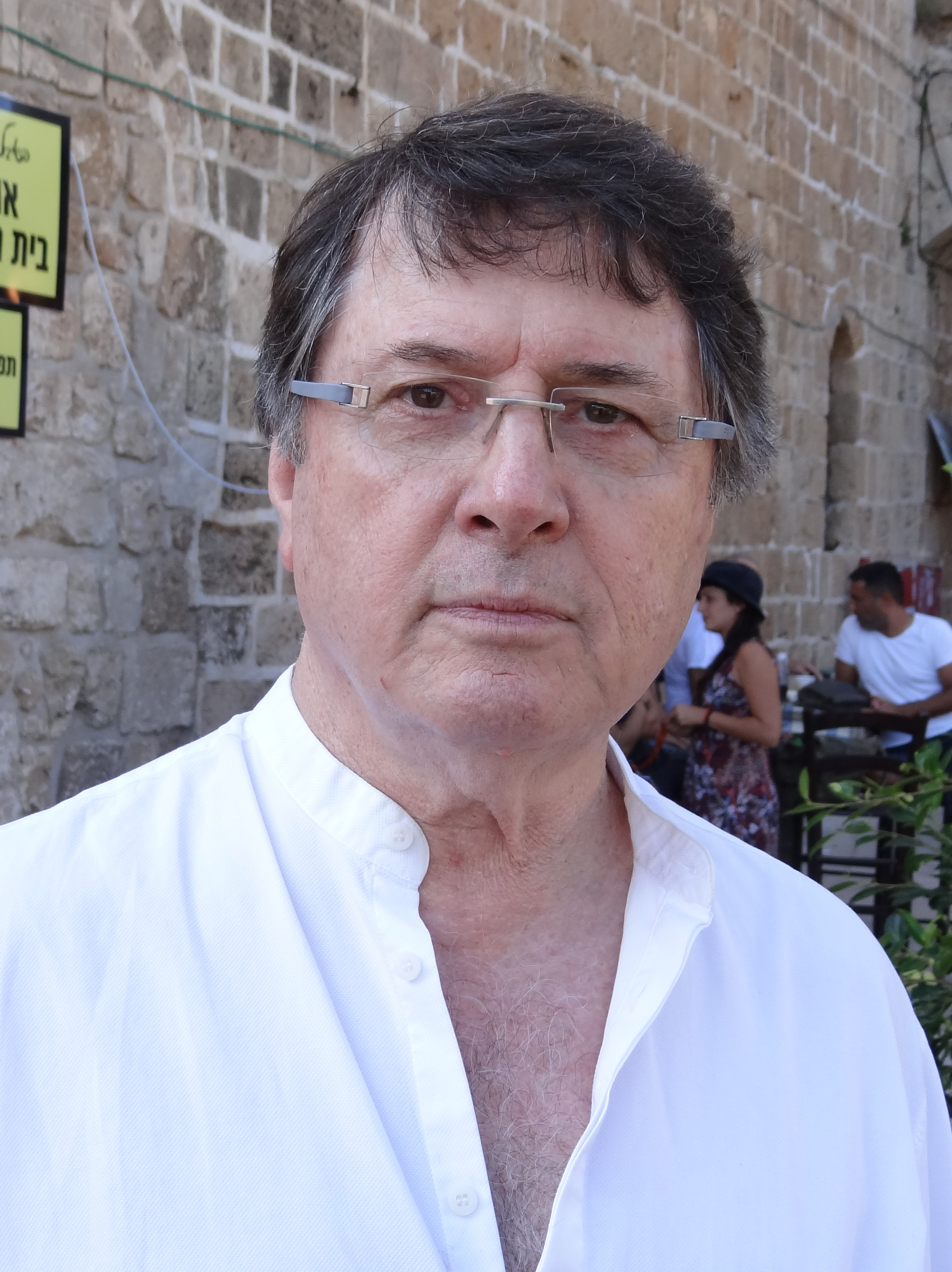
- Kotler at the 2011 Acco Festival of Alternative Israeli Theatre
- Born: 5 May 1937 (age 89); Tel Aviv, Israel
- Occupations: Actor theatre director
- Years active: 1960–present

Oded Kotler (Hebrew: עודד קוטלר; born 5 May 1937) is an Israeli actor, director, artistic director, and author. Kotler is a recipient of the Israel Prize in the field of Performing Arts (2022).

He is best known for his role in the film Three Days and a Child (1967), for which he received the Cannes Film Festival Award for Best Actor and a nomination for the Golden Globe Award for Most Promising Newcomer – Male.

== Biography ==
Born in Tel Aviv, Kotler began his theatrical engagement early, acting and directing in high school. At 17, he secured his first commercial role in the play Tea and Sympathy in the Ha'Ohel Theatre.

His mandatory military service as an actor and director in the Central Command Entertainment Troupe. Following his discharge, he performed in the renowned "Batzal Yarok" troupe and acted in major venues like the Ha'Ohel and Habima Theatres.

=== Foundational roles and artistic directorship ===
Kotler's defining impact on Israeli theater stems from his roles as a founder and artistic director. In the mid-1960s, he co-founded the ensemble "Bamat Ha'Sakhanim" (The Actors' Stage), which focused on contemporary original works.

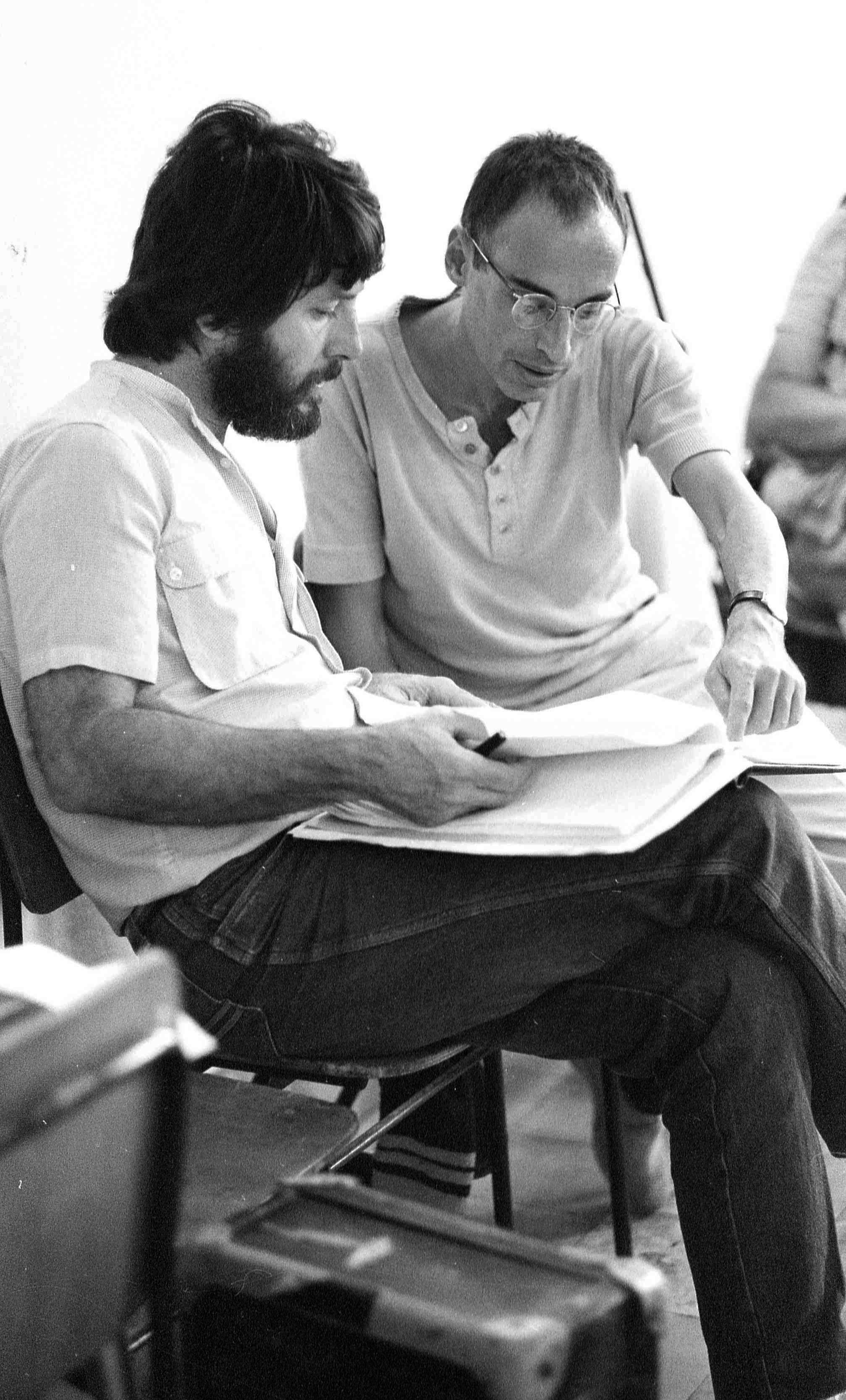
Oded Kotler and Hanoch Levin during work on the play "The Patriot," 1982. From the Dan Hadani Collection, The National Library of Israel.

His first major institutional role was as the Artistic Director of the Haifa Theatre from 1970 to 1978. Under his leadership, the Haifa Theatre became known as a center for developing new Israeli plays that directly addressed the country's social and political realities. As artistic director, he championed works by artists who would become central figures in Israeli culture, such as Hanoch Levin, and later Edna Mazia, and Nissim Aloni.

In the 1980s', he continued his work in founding and directing new venues, including the Neve Tzedek Theatre Center (1980) and co-founding the innovative Acco Festival of Alternative Israeli Theatre. From 1985 to 1990, he directed the Israel Festival. He later returned to the Haifa Theater as Artistic Director from 1990 to 1998, continuing to champion original work while managing institutional challenges.

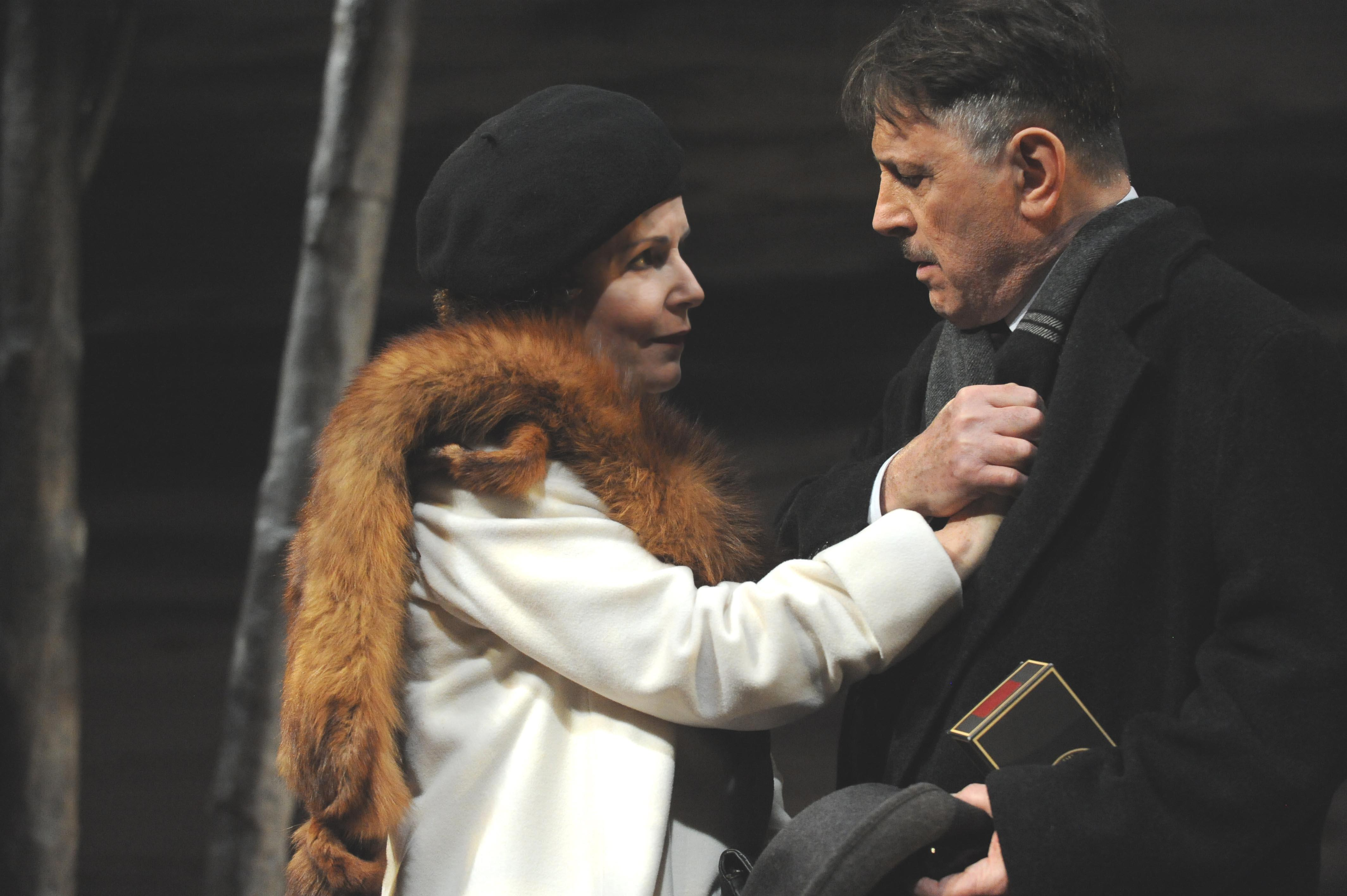
Oded Kotler and Liora Rivlin in the play The Banality of Love (Hebrew title: Ha'banaliyut Shel Ha'ahava), by Savyon Liebrecht, directed by Avishai Milshtein, at the Beit Lessin Theater, 2009.

Kotler has consistently used the theatre as a platform for social commentary, notably staging the play Muvtal Nolad (An Unemployed is Born) in 2005, criticizing the growing materialism and indifference in Israeli society. His commitment to politically charged art was also evident in his work at the short-lived Herzliya Ensemble Theatre (2011–2013).

=== Work in theater, film, and television ===
As a director, Kotler has initiated and staged a vast repertoire of plays across Israeli theaters. Notable directorial credits include seminal Israeli works such as CHefetz, The Labor of Life by Hanoch Levin, Games in the Backyard by Edna Mazia. He also directed the controversial play Hebron, which examined the Israeli-Palestinian conflict from a dual perspective.

As an actor, his career highlights include a leading role in the musical My Fair Lady (2002) and a 2017 monodrama, Yeled Lo Ratzui (Unwanted Child) directed by Nola Chilton.

In cinema, Kotler starred in several acclaimed films. His most notable film roles were in Uri Zohar's Three Days and a Child (1967) and Dan Wolman's My Michael (1975), based on the novel by Amos Oz. He also directed the feature film Roman Be'hemshachim (Serial Romance, 1985) and numerous television documentaries, including a series on the history of Israeli theatre.

== Personal life ==
In his youth, Kotler was the partner of actress Gila Almagor. He was also married to the poet Tirza Atar, and later married actress Liora Rivlin, with whom he has twins: the actress Nina Kotler and the cinematographer Amnon Kotler.

For over forty years, he has been married to Ordit, a cousin of Tirza Atar and the daughter of Akiva Atzmon, who was the commander of the Gadna Command. The couple has one son, Daniel Kotler.

== Selected filmography ==
- Three Days and a Child (1967)
- Every Bastard a King (1968)
- My Michael (1976)

== Awards ==
- Five Kinor David Awards (David's Harp)
- Council for Culture and Art Award
- Best Actor Award at the Cannes Film Festival for his role in the film Three Days and a Child (1967)
- Knesset Speaker's Quality of Life Prize (1983)
- Margalit Prize (1984)
- Chevalier of the Ordre des Arts et des Lettres (Order of Arts and Letters) from the Government of France (1990)
- "Outstanding Director" Award from the Cameri Theatre (2005)
- Rosenblum Prize for the Performing Arts (2006)
- Israel Theatre Prize for Lifetime Achievement (2007)
- Lifetime Achievement Award in Cinema from the Sam Spiegel Film and Television School (2008)
- EMET Prize in the category of Culture and Arts: Directing and Acting in Theatre (2017)
- Lifetime Achievement Award from the Israeli Actors Guild (AMI) (2017)
- Israel Prize in the field of Theatre (2022)
- "Golden Porcupine" Award for Lifetime Achievement (2023)
