= List of Israeli films of the 1970s =

This is a list of films produced in Israel in the 1970s.

== Overview ==
During the 1970s, a lot of films from the Bourekas genre were produced in Israel, the most famous of which is Giv'at Halfon Eina Ona. These films were big successes at the box office but had a harsh critical reception. They were usually demotic comedy films (such as Charlie Ve'hetzi and Hagiga B'Snuker) or sentimental melodramas (such as Nurit). The main subject in most of the Bourekas films was the conflict between various classes and denominations, particularly due to romantic intentions. Prominent filmmakers in this genre during this period include Boaz Davidson, Ze'ev Revach, Yehuda Barkan and George Obadiah.

Besides the Bourekas films, during the 1970s many unique quality films were also created, among them the "New Sensitivity" movement which produced social artistic films. One of the prominent films of this genre is But Where Is Daniel Wax? by Avraham Heffner. Three high-quality films which were created in the 1970s - The Policeman Azoulay (Ephraim Kishon), I Love You Rosa and The House on Chelouche Street by Moshé Mizrahi were candidates for an Oscar Award in the foreign film category.
