= Ze'ev Revach =

Israeli comedian and actor (1940–2025)

- זאב רווח
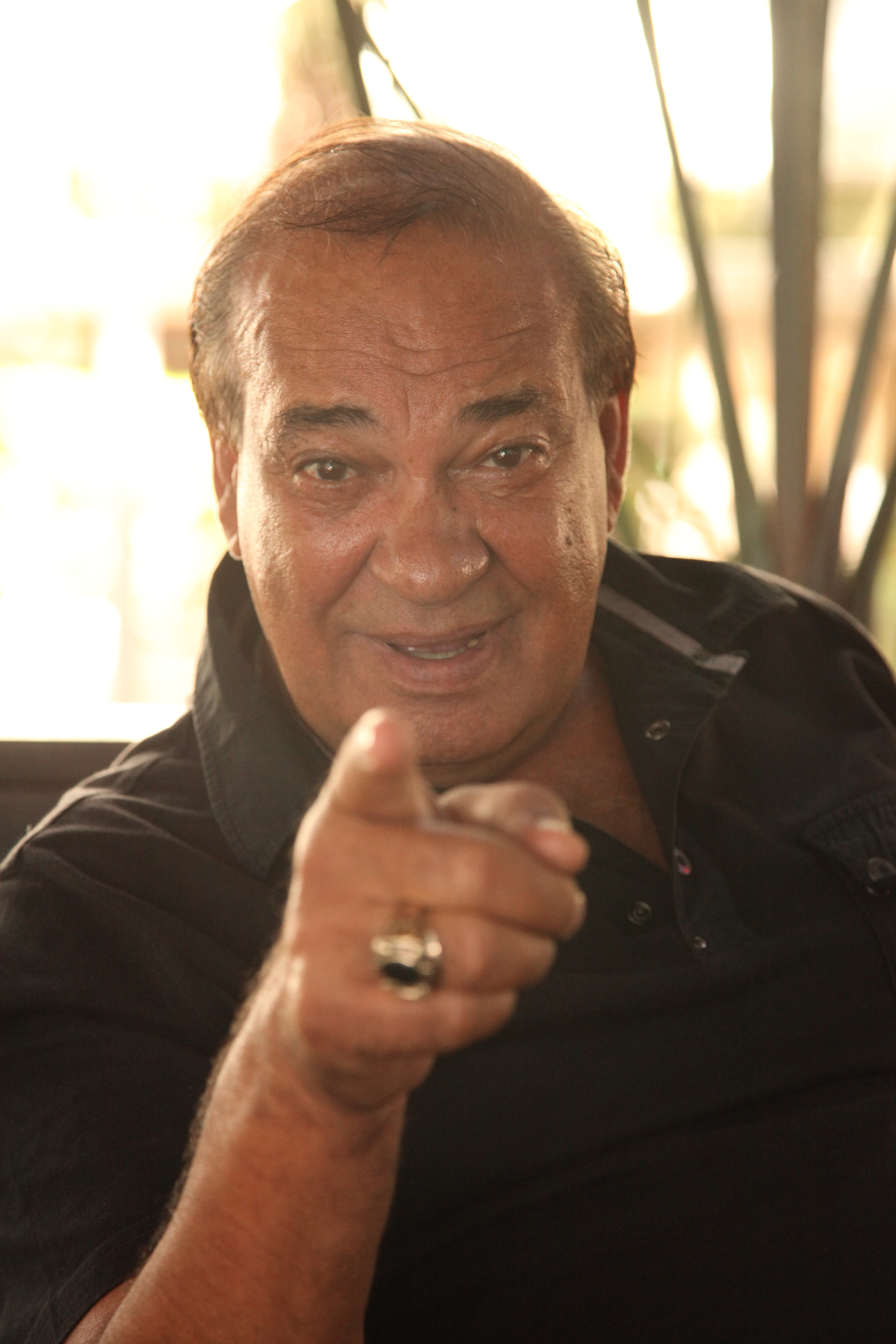
- Revach in 2010
- Born: Ze'ev Nachum Revach; 15 August 1940; Rabat, French protectorate in Morocco
- Died: 18 January 2025 (aged 84); Ramat Gan, Israel
- Education: Beit Zvi
- Occupations: Actor; comedian; film director
- Years active: 1963–2020
- Children: 5
- Awards: Three Ophir Awards

Ze'ev (Ze'evik) Nachum Revach (Hebrew: זאב רווח; 15 August 1940 – 18 January 2025) was an Israeli comedian, actor and filmmaker. His prolific acting career included many roles in film, TV, and theater.

Revach was a particularly prominent actor in the Bourekas films genre, and some of those films, such as Hagiga B'Snuker, and Charlie Ve'hetzi, developed a cult following in Israel over the years. In addition to his acting career, Revach also wrote and directed over a dozen films, mostly comedies, in which he also starred.

Revach has won a total of three Ophir Awards – two in the Best Actor category and one in the Lifetime Achievement category. He is considered one of the most influential and important figures in Israeli cinema.

== Biography ==
=== Early life ===
Revach was born in 1940 in Rabat while it was part of the French protectorate in Morocco to Hana and Rabbi Yitzhak Rioch. He was the eldest of eight siblings. His parents named him after Ze'ev Jabotinsky and Nahum Sokolow. In 1948, at the age of eight, he immigrated with his family to Israel. The family initially settled in an Israeli refugee absorption camp in Haifa. Between the ages of nine and thirteen he lived with his family in the Musrara neighborhood of Jerusalem, where his father later established a synagogue. The family eventually moved to the Kiryat HaYovel neighborhood of Jerusalem. His Moroccan heritage and the working-class environment he grew up in would later inspire many of the characters and scenarios depicted in his films.

At thirteen Revach began studying at the agricultural high school yeshiva in Kfar Hasidim. He later served as a combat soldier in the Israeli Defense Forces as part of the Nahal Brigade.

After his military service Revach studied at the Beit Zvi School for the Performing Arts.

=== Career ===
==== Theater ====
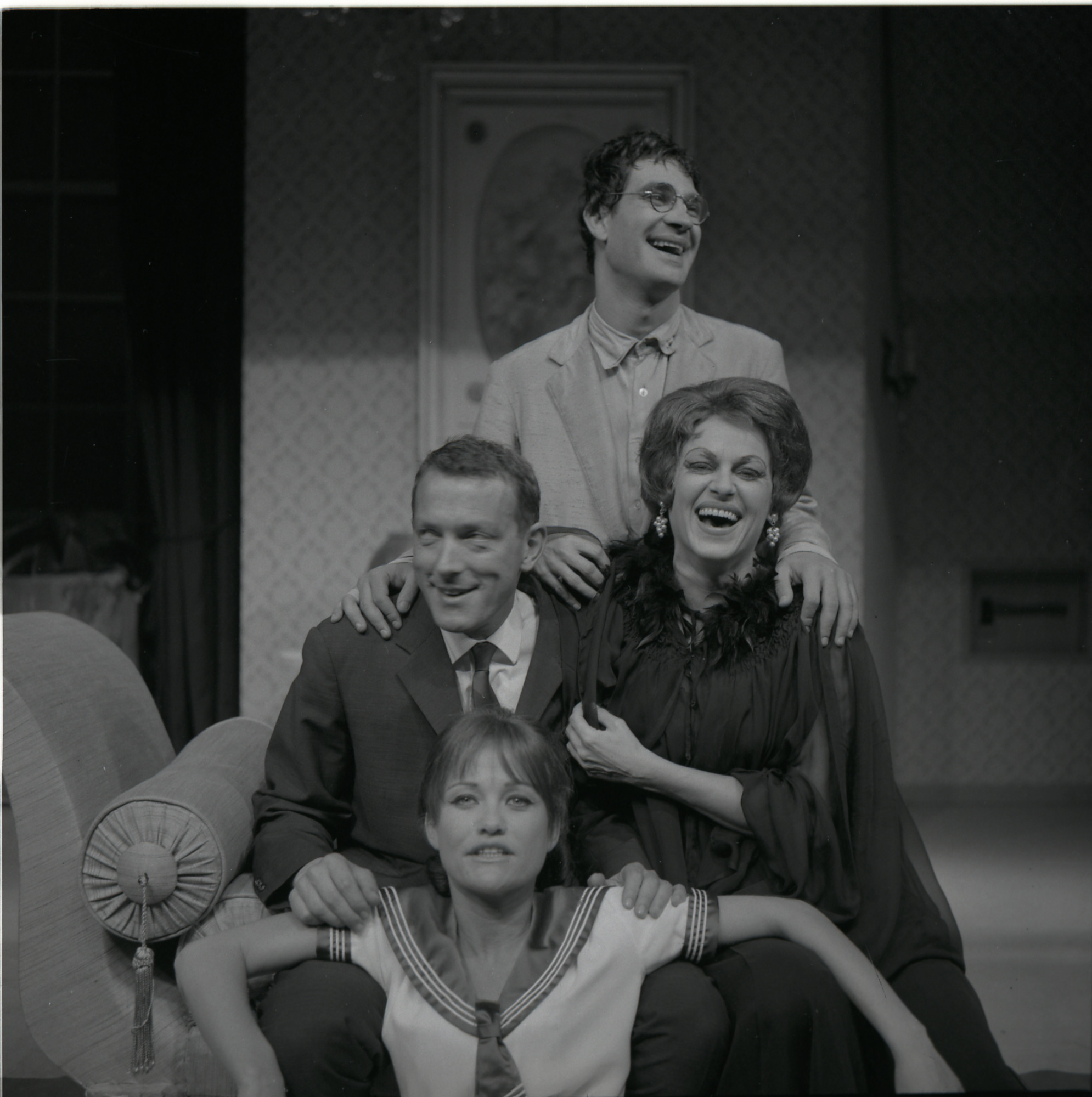
With the cast of the play "Poor Father" (אבאלה עלוב) at the Cameri Theatre, 1966

From 1963 to 1966 Revach was part of the Ohel Theater. During this time Revach performed in various plays including "The Idiot", "The Three Angels", and "Without the Evil Eye".

From 1966 to 1973 Revach was part of the Cameri Theatre. During this time Revach performed in various notable roles, including as Leonardo in "Blood Wedding", as Ubu in "Ubu the King", as Prince Hal in "Henry IV", as Lancelot in "The Dragon", as Figaro in "The Marriage of Figaro", and as Inspector Azoulay in "The Inspector".

In 1988 Revach played in the popular musical "Salleh Shabati" at the Habima Theatre which was directed by Ephraim Kishon and had music composed by Nurit Hirsh. The production, which featured also Geula Nuni and Hanny Nahmias, included the hit song "Ah Ya Rab" and it was performed 172 times across Israel.

Throughout the 1990s and 2000s, Revach continued to act in various notable productions with different theaters, include the plays "The Baker's Wife", "Peter Pan" in which he played Captain Hook, in "Ali Baba and the Forty Thieves", in "Valentino" and in the play "Rubber Merchants".

During the 2000s Revach began also directing theater plays including the 2004 play "I Raised and Elevated Children" in which he directed and performed, and the 2014 play "Momo Renovations" which he both directed and starred in.

In 2013 Revach reprised his role as 'Haham' Hannukah in the theatrical adaptation of the popular 1975 Israeli film "Snooker".

In 2019 Revach acted in a leading role in the play "Restless Old Men".

==== Film ====
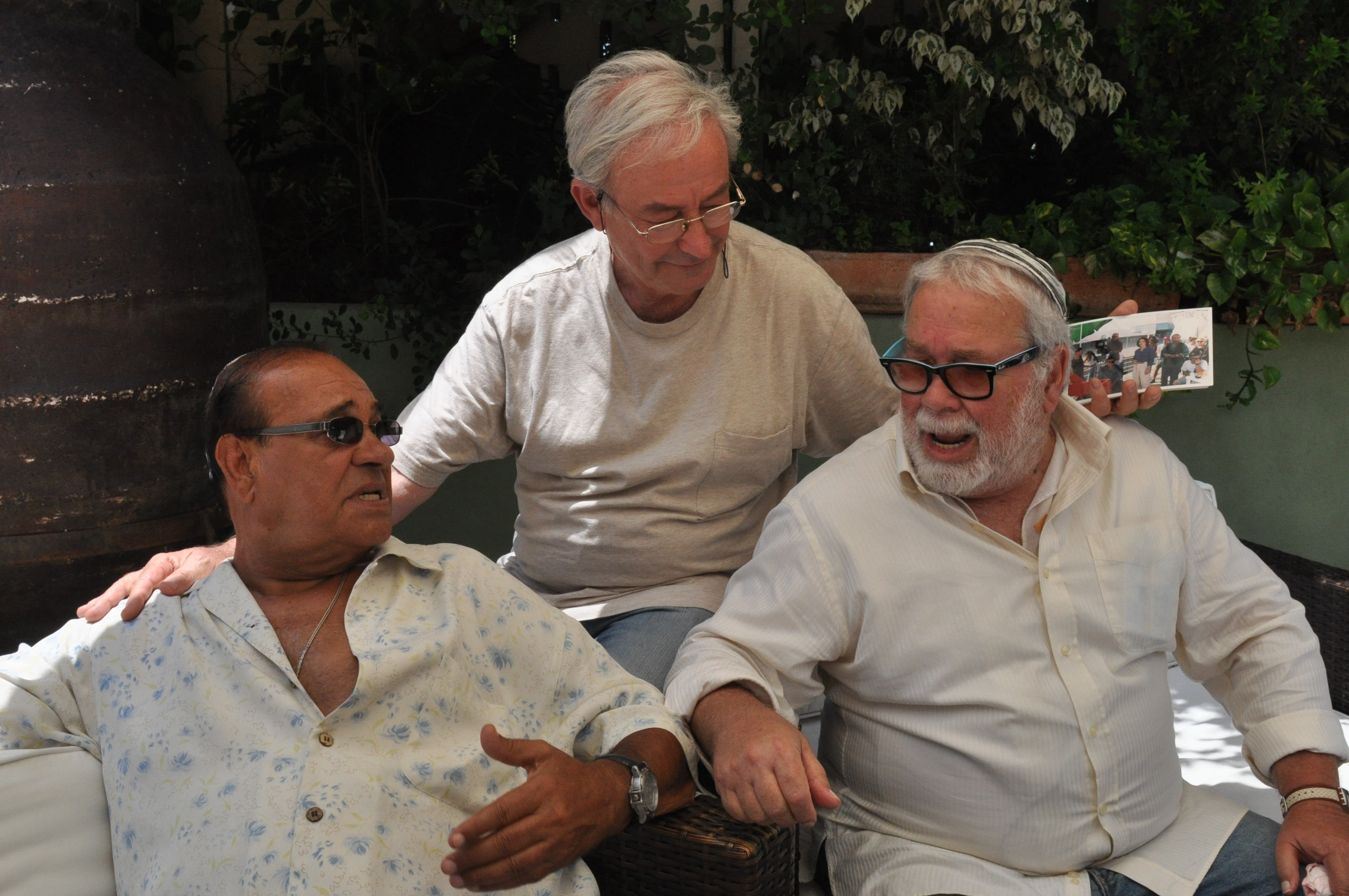
Together with Yehuda Barkan in a filming of the documentary in 2011

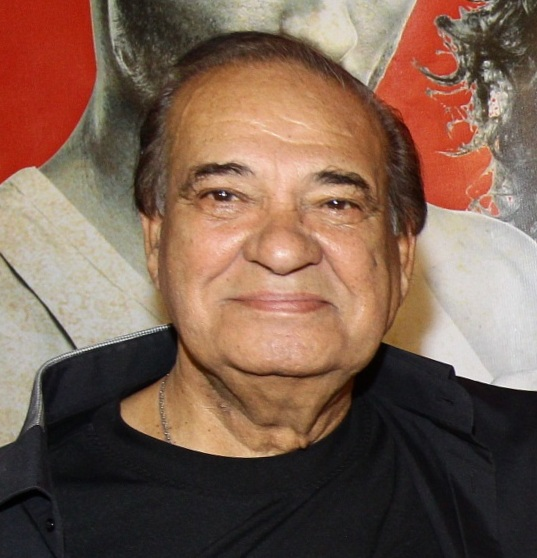
Ze'ev Revach, 2013

Throughout his prolific career, spanning more than five decades, Ze'ev Revach appeared in over 40 films, directed 15, wrote or co-wrote the scripts for 16, and solidified himself as one of the most prominent figures in Israeli cinema. Renowned for his versatility as an actor, director, and writer, Revach contributed to various cinematic genres, though he is particularly revered for his significant contributions to the Bourekas genre—a distinctly Israeli style of comedy-drama films that employs exaggerated ethnic stereotypes to explore social issues. Revach became synonymous with the genre, portraying many colorful and larger-than-life characters, many of whom depicted Mizrahi Jews navigating life on the fringes of society. His roles often embodied underdogs, misfits, or con men, as well as individuals with intellectual disabilities, who found themselves entangled in humorous yet chaotic situations. Revach’s characters frequently used disguises and switched identities during the films, including transformations between Ashkenazi and Mizrahi identities, male and female personas, or playing characters from vastly different socioeconomic backgrounds. Ravach's films often reflected and satirized the social dynamics of the Israeli society, and using humor to tackle serious themes such as cultural assimilation, poverty, and the struggles of marginalized communities. His ability to balance slapstick comedy with poignant social commentary made him a beloved figure in Israeli popular culture.

Revach began his film career in the mid-1960s, making his debut in the film "Sabina" (1966), followed by the film "Scouting Patrol" (1967). His early work also included a role in the Italian-produced film "La Battaglia Del Sinai" (1968), which was released in both Italy and Israel. That same year, he appeared in the short film "The Other Side", directed by Uri Zohar.

During the 1970s Revach collaborated with the director Boaz Davidson in three films which ended up producing some of Revach's most iconic performances. Those three films were "The Snail" (1970), "Charlie and a Half" (1974), and "Snooker" (1975). The latter two, in particular, solidified Revach's status as one of Israel’s leading comedic actors. In addition to these iconic roles, In the first half of the decade Revach also portrayed Elimelech Zorkin in "Hasamba and the Deserted Youths" (1971) and appeared in the American production "The Jerusalem File" (1972), directed by John Flynn.

In the mid-1970s Revach began directing films in which he also starred. His directorial debut, "Only Today" (1976), in which he also played the lead role, became a critical and commercial success. This marked the beginning of a prolific period as a filmmaker which led to the production of the films "Stealing From a Thief is Excused" (1977), "Little Man" (1978), "Wrong Number" (1979), and "Sweet and Sour" (1979). In the second half of the 1970s, besides his directorial projects, Revach also starred in the film "Beautiful Troubles!" (1976) which was directed by Assi Dayan, and in the film "Five Hundred Thousand Under the Table" (1977) which was directed by Shaike Ophir.

In the 1980s Revach co-wrote and starred in the satirical film "The Man Who Flew in to Grab" (1981). In addition he continued his work as a director-actor in films like "Mr. Leon" (1982), "The Ladies' Hairdresser" (1984), "Batito the Unemployed" (1987), "On the Fringe" (1988), and "Lend Me Your Wife" (1989). In 1987 he also played a lead role in the French film "If You Go to Rio...You Die", which was filmed in Brazil and co-written by Revach.

The 1990s marked Revach’s entry into Hollywood, with appearances in productions such as "The Quest" (1996), starring Jean-Claude Van Damme and "Escape: Human Cargo" (1998). In addition, during this period Revach also directed the films "A Bit of Luck" (1992) and "Buskila Twins" (1998) in which he also played a lead role.

In 2000, he appeared in the Hollywood action film "The Last Warrior" (2000), starring Dolph Lundgren. This decade saw him transition to more dramatic roles, with notable performances in the films "Beitar Provence" (2002), "It Will Be Alright" (2008), and Haim Bozaglo's crime drama "Honor" (2009), which demonstrated his range and depth as an actor.

In the 2010s were marked by critically acclaimed performances in films such as Shemi Zarhin's "The World is Funny" (2012), David Ohana's "White Panther" (2013), and in Ronit and Shlomi Elkabetz's "Gett: The Trial of Viviane Amsalem" (2014). He also appeared in the films "The Farewell Party" (2014) and "Last Honor" (2017), further cementing his reputation as a dramatic actor of note.

During the 2020s Revach voiced the character Ben-Gamla in the animated historical drama film "Legend of Destruction" (2021) directed by Gidi Dar, and starred in the film "The Flower Gate" (2022). In 2021 Revach also participated in a music video for Eyal Golan's cover version of the song “Yamim Tovim” (ימים טובים), originally composed by Yair Rosenblum with lyrics by Yoram Taharlev. The song originally served as the opening theme song for Revach’s film "Only Today" and was originally performed by his younger brother, Uri Revach. The music video, which paid homage to Revach's cinematic legacy, featured Golan and Revach viewing clips from the original film.

In 2025, a documentary titled "Good Days: The Story of Ze'ev Revach", directed by Alon Gur Aryeh, is set to premiere. The film, which focuses on Revach's life and career, includes also interviews with Revach and archival footage. The film is set to compete at the Haifa International Film Festival, the Docaviv Film Festival, and Cinema Darom Festival. It will also air on the Israeli TV channels Hot 8 and Yes Doku.

==== Television ====
In 1978 Revach played a lead role in the TV film "Hafif", alongside Jacques Cohen. In 1994 he played a lead role in the comedy TV series "Papa".

Between 1999 and 2000 Revach hosted the Israeli talk show "In the Tavern" which was broadcast on Channel 1.

Between 2002 and 2004 he portrayed Avraham Algrabli in the Israeli drama series "The Truck", which aired on Channel 2.

In 2002, Revach directed and starred in the television film "Rubber Merchants", based on an Israeli play of the same name. The screenplay for the film was co-written by Assi Dayan and Ze'ev Revach. Revach played a leading role alongside Yosef Shiloach and Adi Lev.

In 2003, coinciding with the launch of the Israeli Cinema Channel on the Israeli direct broadcast satellite TV provider Yes, Revach hosted several TV shows dedicated to the history and development of Israeli cinema during different periods.

In 2010 Revach reprised his role as Elimelech Zorkin in the Comedy-Drama TV series "Hasamba 3G" which was broadcast on the Israeli channels HOT3 and Arutz HaYeladim. It was the same character he originally portrayed in the 1971 film "Hasamba and the Deserted Youths". That same year, he also played a lead role in the crime drama "Marciano's Honor", created by Haim Bozaglo.

In 2011, Revach made a guest appearance alongside Yehuda Barkan in the third season of the comedy series "Naor's Friends", which aired on Channel 10.

In 2013, he starred in the comedy series "Malabi Express", which aired on Channel 10. In 2016 played in the Israeli children's comedy series "Sofshely", which aired on the Israeli Children's Channel.

In 2017 Revach portrayed Mordechai Balili, the owner of an event hall, in the Israeli sitcom "Smachot", which aired on Channel 2.

In 2018 he played Manny Graziano in the drama series The Shadows which aired on the HOT cable network.

=== Political activity ===
Revach, a vocal supporter of the Likud party, appeared in its 1992 election ads and later ran for a seat on the Ramat Gan City Council in 2003.

=== Personal life ===
Revach was initially married to the actress Shula Revach, with whom he had two daughters. After their divorce he married Mali Angelou, with whom he had three children. He used to live with his family in Ramat Gan.

In June 2019, Revah, who was a heavy smoker, suffered a stroke, from which he never fully recovered. In his later years, he battled dementia. On January 18, 2025, at the age of 84, Revah died peacefully in his sleep at his home in Ramat Gan. He was laid to rest at the Kiryat Shaul cemetery.

== Accolades ==
- In 2002, Revach won the Israeli Film Academy's Best Actor Award for his performance as Shabtai Kassodas in the film "Beitar Provence".
- In 2010, Revach was awarded the Israeli Film Academy's Lifetime Achievement Award, in recognition of his significant contribution to Israeli cinema.
- In 2014, Revach won the Israeli Film Academy's Best Actor Award for his performance as Yehezkel in the film "The Farewell Party".
- In April 2018, Revach was chosen to light a torch at the official torch-lighting ceremony for the 70th anniversary celebrations of the State of Israel, alongside renowned Israeli stage actress Lea Koenig.

== Filmography ==
=== Acting roles ===
In Film

Year	International title	Hebrew title	Role	Notes
1966	Sabina	Sabina VehaGvarim, סבינה והגברים		
1967	Scouting Patrol	Sayarim, סיירים	Eli	
1968	La Battaglia Del Sinai	Hamisha Yamim BeSinai, חמישה ימים בסיני		Italian produced film released in Italy and Israel
1968	The Other Side	HaTzad HaSheni, הצד השני		Short film directed by Uri Zohar
1969	Blaze on the Water	Lahat Bamayim, להט במים	Yarden	
1970	The Snail	Shablul, שבלול	Shtarkman	Directed by Boaz Davidson
1971	Hasamba and the Deserted Youths	Chassamba ve'Na'arei Ha'hefker, חסמבה ונערי ההפקר	Elimelech Zorkin	Directed by Yoel Zilberg
1972	The Jerusalem File	Tik Yerushalayim, תיק ירושלים	Rashid	Directed by John Flynn
1974	Charlie and a Half	Charlie Ve'hetzi, צ'ארלי וחצי	Sasson	Directed by Boaz Davidson
1975	Snooker	Hagiga B'Snuker, חגיגה בסנוקר	Sasson / "Chakam" Hannukah	Directed by Boaz Davidson
1976	Beautiful Troubles!	Yofi Shel Tzarot, יופי של צרות	Armond	Directed by Assi Dayan
1976	Only Today	Rak Hayom, רק היום	Sason	His first film as a director
1977	Five Hundred Thousand Under the Table	Chamesh Me'ot Elef Shachor, חמש מאות אלף שחור	Insurance Agent Mazor Mizrahi	Directed by Shayka Ofir
1977	Stealing From a Thief is Excused	HaGonev Miganav Patoor, הגונב מגנב פטור	Sason	His second film as a director
1978	Little Man	Shraga Katan, שרגא קטן	Shraga	His third film as a director
1979	Sweet and Sour	Lo La'alot Yoter, לא לעלות יותר	Sason	His fourth film as a director
1979	Wrong Number	Ta'ut Bamispar, טעות במספר	Ze'evik Sason	His fifth film as a director
1981	The Man Who Flew in to Grab	Ha'ish Sheba Lakachat, האיש שבא לקחת	Raboa	Directed by Prosper Friende. Revach co-wrote the script.
1982	Mr. Leon	Adon Leon, אדון ליאון	Leon Moyal	His sixth film as a director
1984	The Ladies' Hairdresser	Sapar Nashim, ספר נשים	Victor / Michel	His seventh film as director
1987	Batito the Unemployed	Ha-Muvtal Batito, המובטל בטיטו	Sason Batito	His eighth film as director
1987	On the Fringe	Bouba, בובה	Bouba (Yehuda)	His ninth film as a director
1987	If You Go to Rio...You Die		The bishop	
1989	Lend Me Your Wife	Talveh Li Et Ishteha, תלווה לי את אשתך	Sason	
1992	A Bit of Luck	Tipat Mazal, טיפת מזל	Jojo Ben Shoshan	
1996	The Quest		Turkish Captain	Hollywood film starring Jean-Claude van Damme
1998	Buskila Twins	Pa'amaim Buskila, פעמיים בוסקילה	Pappy Buskila / Max Buskila	
1998	Escape: Human Cargo		Sheik Abdulla Fazza	Hollywood film
1999	Delta Force One: The Lost Patrol		Youssef	Hollywood film
2000	The Last Warrior		Cooky	Hollywood film starring Dolph Lundgren
2002	Beitar Provence	Beitar Provence, בית"ר פרובנס	Shabtai Kasudas	Directed by Uri Inbar
2008	It'll Be Okay	Yiheye B'Seder, יהיה בסדר		
2009	Honor	Kavod, כבוד	Leon Marciano	Directed by Haim Bozaglo
2011	Meet Agam	Lifgosh Et Agam, לפגוש את אגם	A wise man on a bench	
2012	The World is Funny	HaOlam Matzchik, העולם מצחיק	Rahamim	Directed by Shemi Zarhin
2013	White Panther	Panter Lavan, פנתר לבן	David Ohana	Directed by Danny Reisfeld
2014	Gett: The Trial of Viviane Amsalem	Get, גט	Simo Abukasis	Directed by Ronit and Shlomi Elkabetz
2014	The Farewell Party	Mita Tova, מיתה טובה	Yehezkel	
2017	Last Honor	Kavod Aharon, כבוד אחרון		
2021	Legend of Destruction	Agadat Churban, אגדת חורבן	Ben-Gamla	
2022	The Flower Gate	Sha'ar HaPerachim, שער הפרחים	Chavil	
2024	Good Days: The Story of Ze'ev Revach	Yamim Tovim: Sipuro Shel Ze'ev Revach, ימים טובים: סיפורו של זאב רווח		Documentary

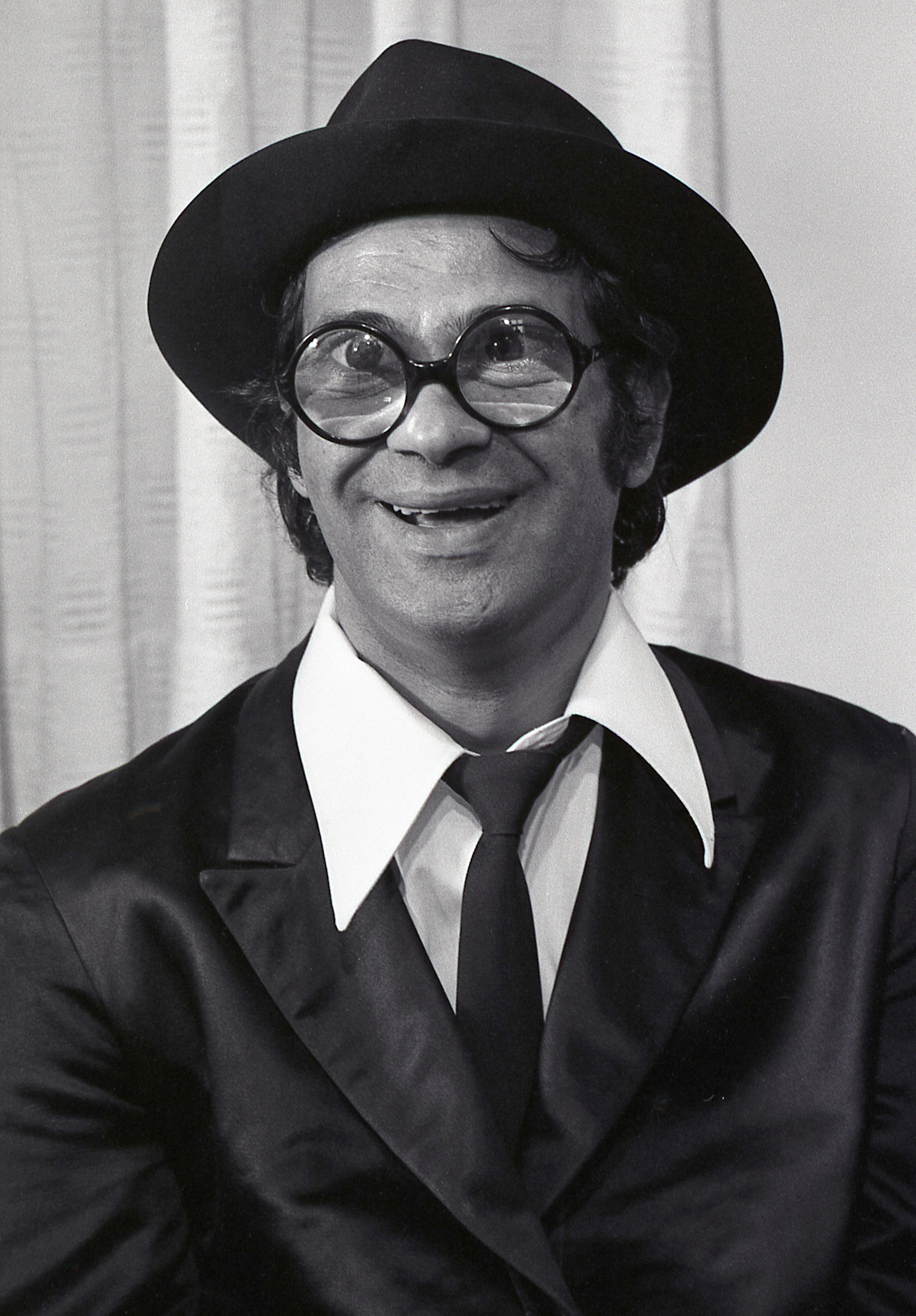
Ze'ev Revach in the role of 'Haham' Hannukah in the film "Snooker", 1975

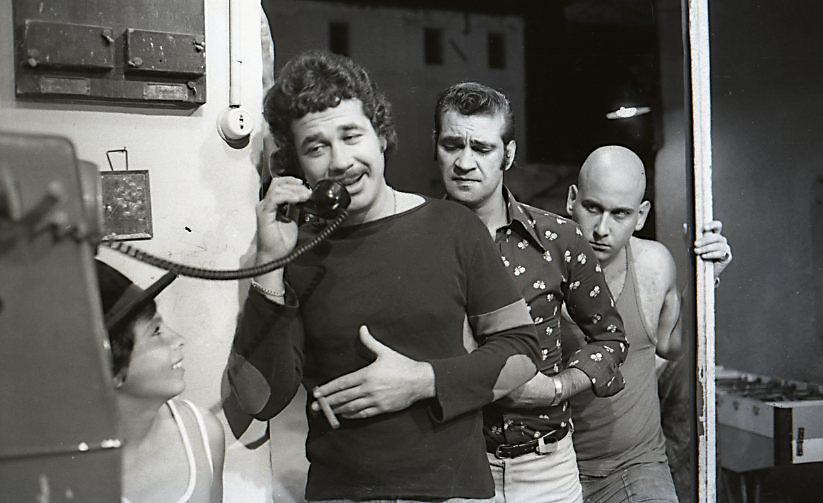
Ze'ev Revach, Yehuda Barkan and Moshe Ish-Kasit on the set of the film "Charlie and a Half", 1975

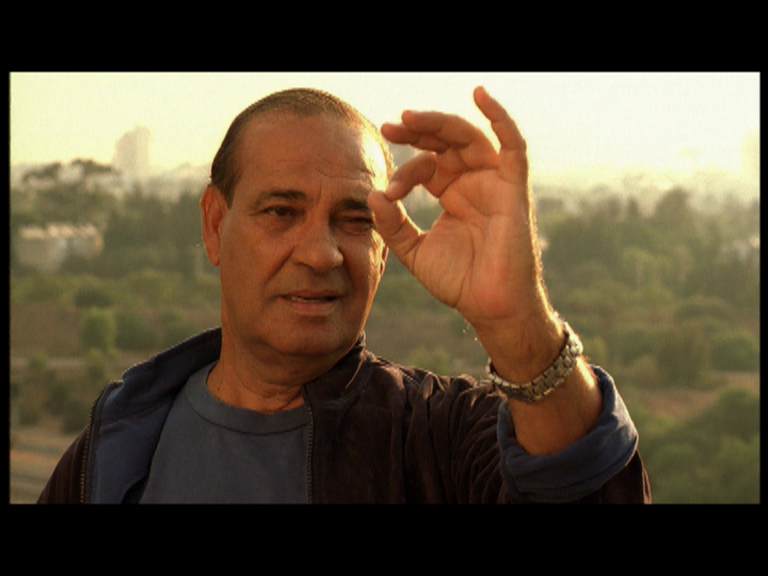
Ze'ev Revach in Uri Inbar's film, "Beitar Provence", 2002

On Television

Year	International title	Hebrew title	Role	Notes
1978	No Worries	Hafif, חפיף	Rafi	TV movie directed by Ian McNaughton
1994	Papa	Papa, פאפא	Leon "Papa" Ben Naim	TV series directed by Ze'ev Revach
2002	Rubber Merchants	Sochrei Gumi, סוחרי גומי		TV movie directed by Ze'ev Revach
2002	The Truck	HaMasa'it, המשאית	Avraham Algrabli	TV series
2003	Guesthouses	Tzimrim, צימרים	Karol Bresnow	TV series. Guest role
2005	Life Isn't Everything	Ha-Chaim Ze Lo Hacol, החיים זה לא הכל	Himself	TV series. Guest role
2006	Mortgage	Mashkenta, משכנתא		TV movie directed by Sharon Maimon and Tal Granit
2009	Always the Same Dream	Tamid Oto Halom, תמיד אותו חלום	Jacques Abramson	Mini-series. Guest role
2011	Naor's Friends	HaKhaverim Shel Naor, החברים של נאור	Himself	TV series. Guest role
2011	Marciano's Honor	HaKavod Shel Marciano, הכבוד של מרציאנו	Leon Marciano	TV series based on the 2009 Israeli film "Honor"
2013	Hasamba 3G	Hasamba Dor 3, חסמבה דור 3	Elimelech Zorkin	TV series
2013	Malabi Express	Malabi Express, מלבי אקספרס	Rabbi Shriki	TV series. Guest role
2016	Sofshely	Sofshely, סופשלי	Sofshely	TV series
2017	Smachot	Smachot, שמחות	Mordechai Balli	TV series
2018	The Reign of Shadows	Shilton HaTzalalim, שלטון הצללים	Manny Graziano	TV series
2018	Our Treasure	Ha'Otzar Shelanu, האוצר שלנו	Ze'evik Bar-Yosef	TV series

=== Directing and/or screenwriting credits ===
Year	International title	Hebrew title	Director	Screenwriter	Notes
1976	Just Today	Rak Hayom, רק היום	Yes	Yes	
1977	Stealing From a Thief is Excused	HaGonev Miganav Patoor, הגונב מגנב פטור	Yes	Yes	
1978	Little Man	Shraga Katan, שרגא קטן	Yes	Yes	Based on a play by Hillel Mittelpunkt
1979	Wrong Number	Ta'ut Bamispar, טעות במספר	Yes	Yes	
1979	Sweet and Sour	Lo La'alot Yoter, לא לעלות יותר	Yes	Yes	
1980	Growing Pains	Pitzei Bagrut 80, פצעי בגרות 80	Yes	Yes	The only film that Revach directed and did not act in
1981	The Man Who Flew in to Grab	Ha'ish Sheba Lakachat, האיש שבא לקחת	No	Yes	Co-writer
1982	Mr. Leon	Adon Leon, אדון ליאון	Yes	Yes	
1984	The Ladies' Hairdresser	Sapar Nashim, ספר נשים	Yes	Yes	
1987	Batito the Unemployed	Ha-Muvtal Batito, המובטל בטיטו	Yes	Yes	Based on a play by Tommy Lapid
1987	On the Fringe	Bouba, בובה	Yes	Yes	Based on a play by Hillel Mittelpunkt
1987	If You Get to Rio...You Die		No	Yes	French film filmed in Brazil.
1989	Lend Me Your Wife	Talveh Li Et Ishteha, תלווה לי את אשתך	Yes	Yes	
1992	A Bit of Luck	Tipat Mazal, טיפת מזל	Yes	Yes	
1998	Buskila Twins	Pa'amaim Buskila, פעמיים בוסקילה	Yes	Yes	
2002	Rubber Merchants	Sochrei Gumi, סוחרי גומי	Yes	Yes	TV movie
2008	Community of Saints	Kehillat Kedoshim, קהילת קדושים	Yes	No	A documentary film released on videotape and DVD which depicts life in Morocco

== See also ==
- Cinema of Israel
- Culture of Israel
- Theater of Israel
