= Geva Films =

Israeli film studio

- Industry: Film
- Founded: 1949
- Founders: Mordechai Navon; Yitzhak Agadati; Yosef Navon
- Defunct: Early 1990s
- Headquarters: 65 Weizman Street, Givatayim, Tel Aviv, Israel
- Number of locations: 1
- Area served: Israel
- Products: Film

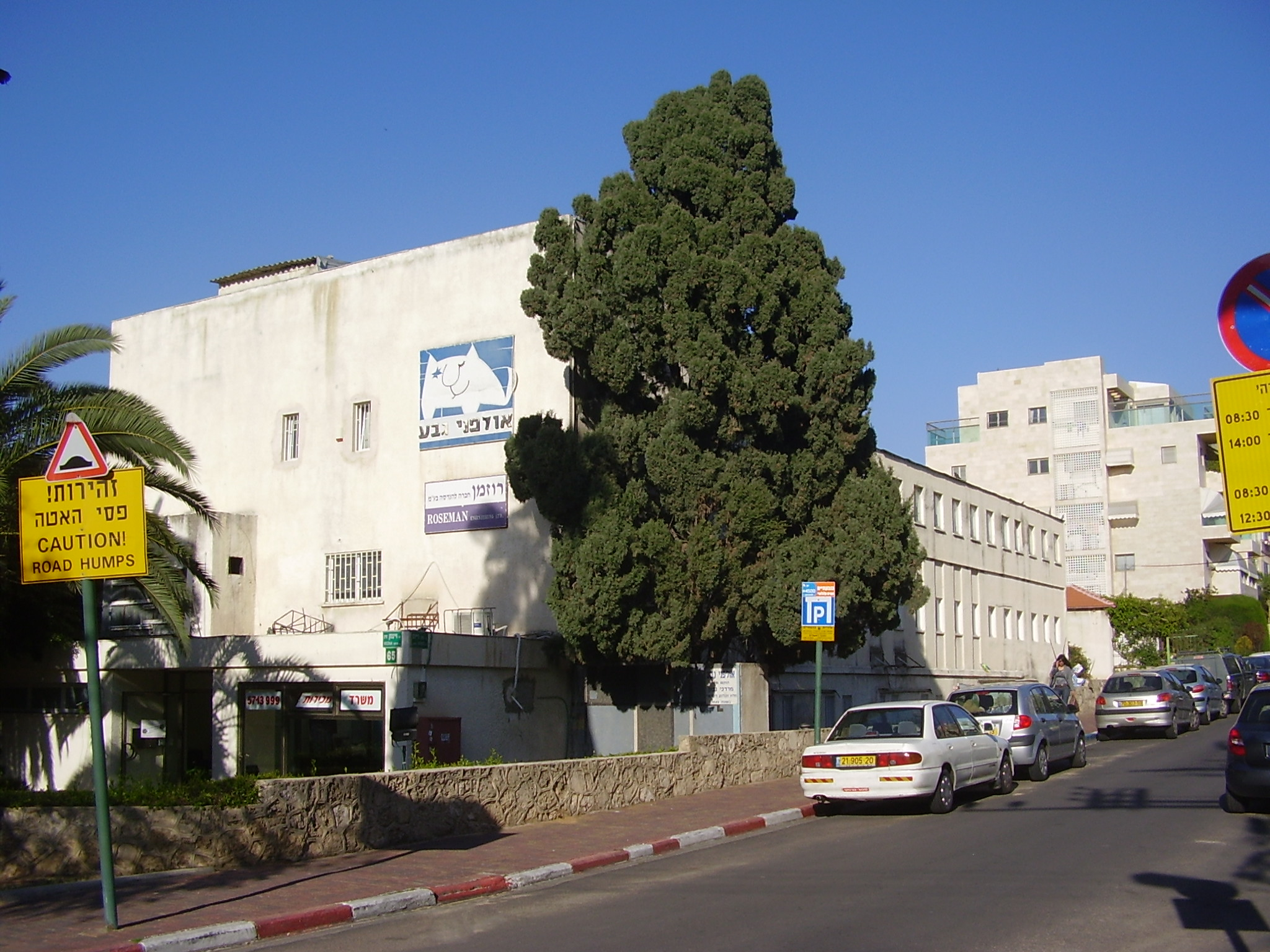
Geva Studios building before demolition

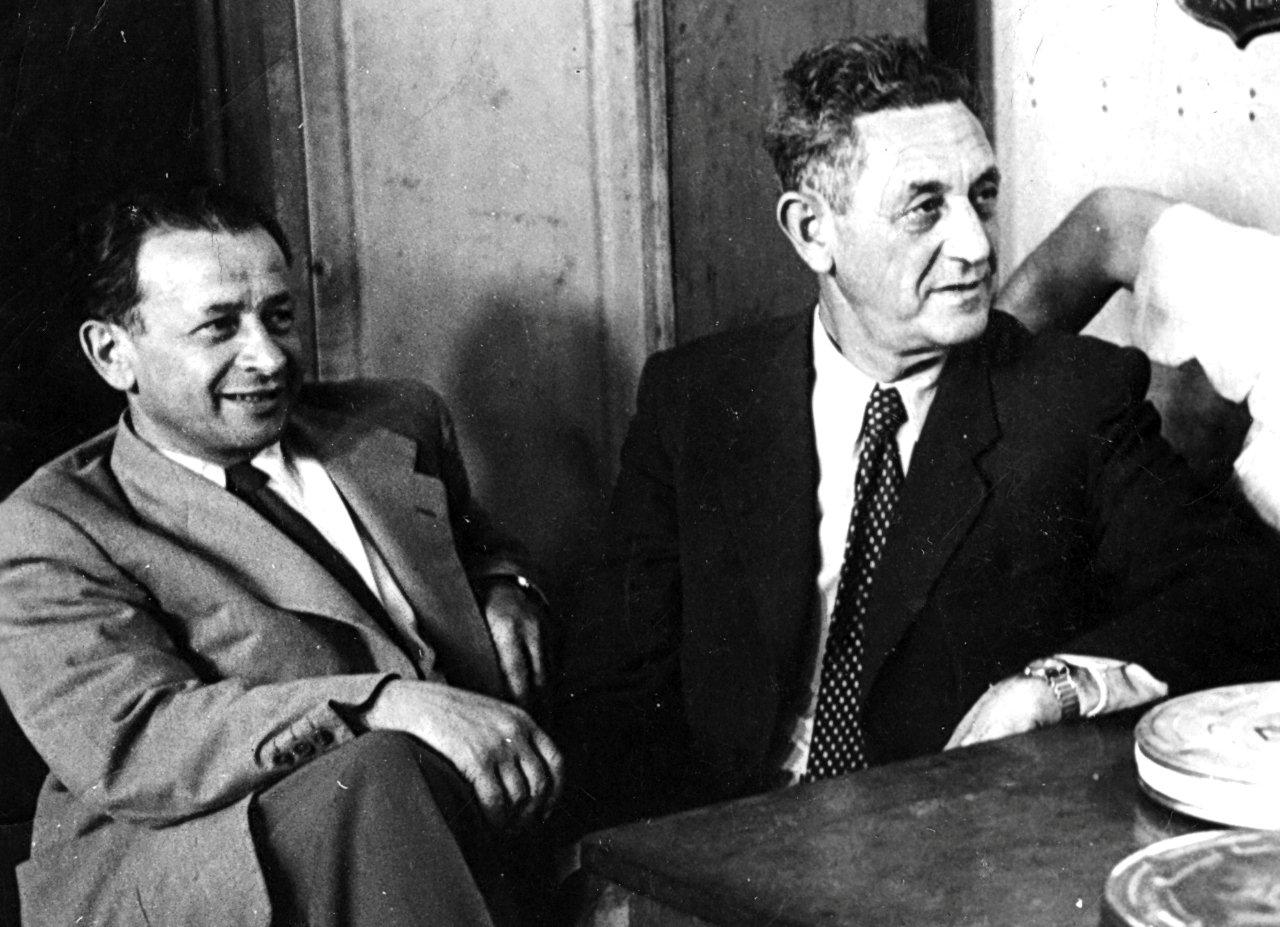
Mordechai Navon and Yitzhak Agadati

Geva Films (Hebrew: סרטי גבע, Sirtei Geva), or the Geva film studio and laboratory was one of the first film studios in Israel. It was established in 1949 in the city of Givatayim near Tel Aviv by Mordechai Navon , Yitzhak Agadati and Yosef Navon. It produced newsreels for cinemas and short films, as well as feature films.

The studio closed in the early 1990s and the building was demolished in September 2011 and two residential towers (Geva Towers (Hebrew: מגדלי גבע)) were built in its place. Shortly prior to the demolition, the building hosted a farewell exhibition, curated by Israeli film scholar Ya'akov Gross.

== History ==
In 1948, sound engineer, Yosef Navon held a meeting with Yitzhak Agadati, a cameraman and lab technician, whom he knew from the Haganah. In 1936, Agadati had produced This is the Land, the first Hebrew-language film and which had been directed by this brother Baruch Agadati. Navon then connected Agadati with his cousin, Modechai Navon, an investor and businessman, who invested in the filming and laboratory equipment. Through his connections with the Haganah, Agadati secured land to build the studio. They were built on the site of a disused woodshed in Givatayim. The studio initially had offices above the Givatayim municipal swimming pool in 1949.

The arrival of Jewish film professionals from Europe, among them, pre-state pioneers and Holocaust survivors shaped the workforce of the studio. Many recruits in the Israel Defense Forces (IDF) Film Unit (Yehidat HaHasrata) would forge civilian careers with Geva, through relationships forged with Natan Gross, the first director of the studio. Alfred Steinhardt was among the recruits to move to Geva after his military service. He further cultivated the relationship between the studio and the unit. He encouraged studio apprentices to conscript into the Unit. The recruits would gain valuable knowledge with the Unit that could be put to use on their return to Geva, where they could take on more senior positions. This allowed the studio to become an important pipeline for the Unit, which was hailed as a serious filmmaking school. Apprentices at the studio included the cinematographer Adam Greenberg.

In 1954, the Government enacted the Hok HaKolnoa (The Cinema Law), legislating greater state support for cinema. Under the new law, the production of newsreels was divided between Geva and Israel Motion Picture Studio. Geva had also entered a partnership with Colon, a recently-formed Hebrew language collective drawing largely from a cohort of Polish Jewish filmmakers. Under this system the two studios alternated the weekly production of newsreels.

The studio produced documentary films and newsreels about the flourishing Kibbutzim, Histadrut and new settlements. There was also a diverse output of narrative-driven films with the acclaimed Hole in the Moon (1964) by Uri Zohar. There were also historical epics and films about the 1948 War of Independence. The studio also tapped into the popularity of ethnic comedies, with Menahem Golan's Kazablan (1973) and other Bourekas film projects.

The demise of the studios was attributed to the growing popularity of television and disagreements between the new owners of the studios. This culminated in the closure of the studios in the early 1990s.

Ya’akov Gross, a film historian and son of Nathan Gross, one of the early filmmakers at the studio, planned to preserve the studio buildings as a national film museum and to be used by a younger cohort of filmmakers and television studios. However, the building's owner and the municipality of Givatayim instead chose to redevelop the site for apartments through developers. Gross was however, permitted to mount a one-month farewell exhibition to the studio before its demolition in 2011.

== Produced films ==
- 1956 – Tale of A Taxi, comedy, black-and-white
- 1959 – Pillar of Fire
- 1960 – I Like Mike
- 1963 – What a Gang
- 1963 – El Dorado
- 1964 – Eight in Pursuit of One
- 1964 – Dalia And The Sailors
- 1965 – Hole in the Moon
- 1965 – Un soir à Tibériade
- 1966 – The Flying Matchmaker (Two Kuni Lemel), film musical
- 1973 - Kazablan

== People ==
- Mordechai Navon, a founder
- Yitzhak Agadati, a founder, brother of Baruch Agadati
- Yosef Navon, a founder of the Geva Film Studios, director, cameraman and sound technician
- Jachin Hirsch, worked on the Geva Films' newssreels in late 1950s
- Amnon Salomon
- Adi Talmor
