= Talmor =

Talmor is a surname. Notable people with the surname include:

- Adi Talmor (1953–2011), Israeli journalist and news presenter
- Ohad Talmor (born 1970), Swiss-born American musician
