= Bourekas film =

Genre of Israeli comic melodrama

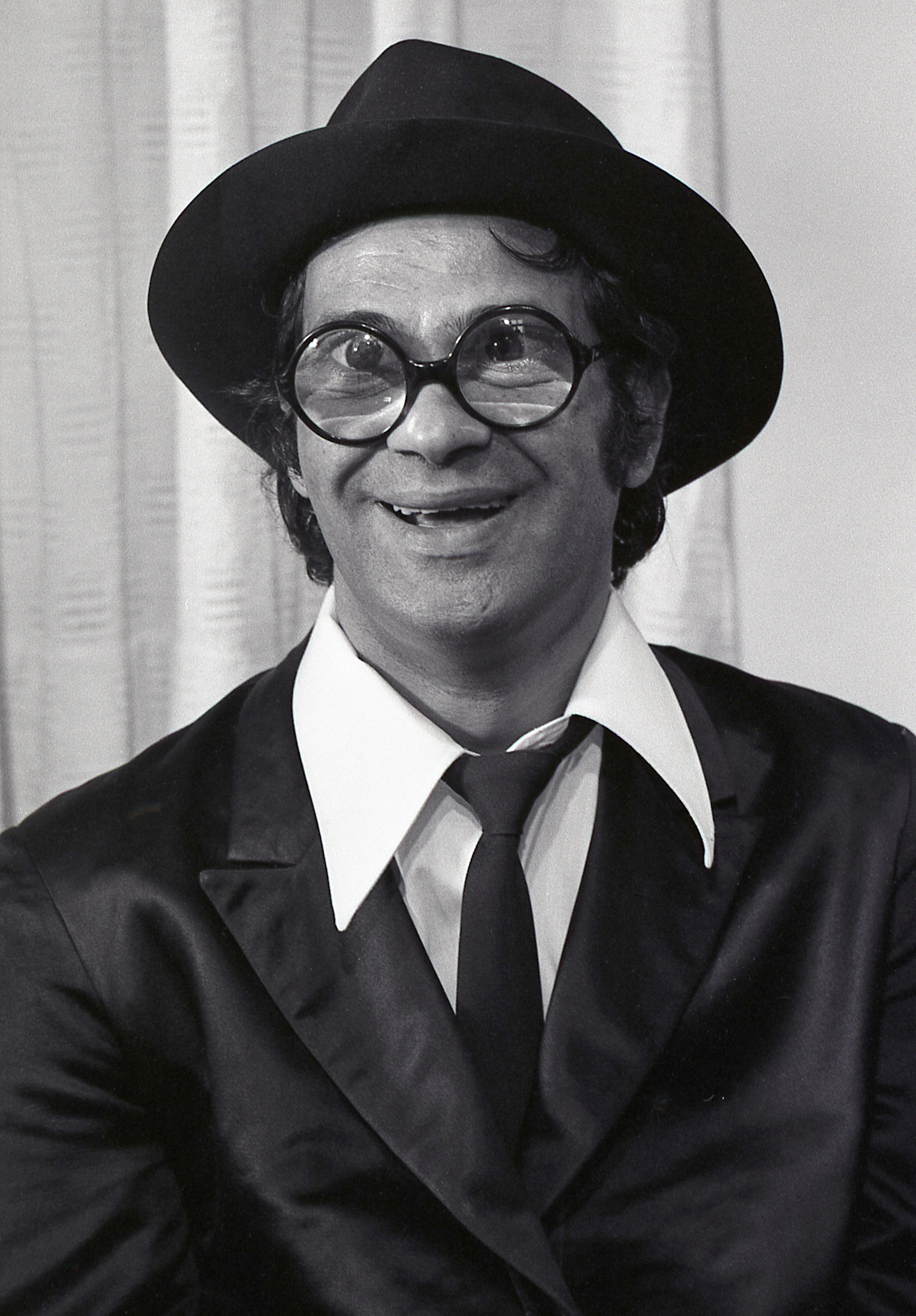
Ze'ev Revach in a classical bourekas film Hagiga B'Snuker (1975)

Bourekas films (Hebrew: סרטי בורקס) (named after the pastry bourekas) represent a genre of Israeli comic melodrama films popular in the 1960s and 1970s. The films excelled at blending humor, drama, and social commentary in a unique storytelling approach that would portray the multicultural fabric of Israeli society.

Bourekas films were traditionally acclaimed for their blend of lighthearted and serious themes, carving out a place in film significance in both Israeli filmmaking and global cinema.

Haaretz film critic Uri Klein describes Bourekas films as a "peculiarly Israeli genre of comic melodramas or tearjerkers... based on ethnic stereotypes". They were "home-grown farces and melodramas that provided escapist entertainment during a tense period in Israeli history".

== History ==
The term was likely coined by Israeli film director Boaz Davidson, the creator of several such films, as a play on words on the "Spaghetti Western" genre, known as such because that particular Western subgenre was produced in Italy. Bourekas are a popular food in Israeli cuisine.

Bourekas films emerged during the same period as the Israeli New Sensibility movement. The latter was characterized by its focus on individual autonomy, and was influenced by the French New Wave and Italian Neorealism.

Although Bourekas films were some of the most successful in the box office, they typically received terrible reviews from critics. They were described as low-brow and vulgar, and an inaccurate representation of Israel that was detrimental to its image. In critique, Sallah Shabbati Biltzki in Al HaMishmar said, "Because parties in Israel are presented not only in the distorted mirror of a distorted humor but also in the ugly mirror of the image of public and organizational life...One has to think twice if such a film should represent us abroad". In the late 1970s, the popularity of Bourekas films declined. In the 1980s, Israeli films became more politically charged and began to address controversial topics. Many Bourekas films have since gained cult status in Israel.

As of 2025, Bourekas films' focus on family, identity and adaptation remains popular in Israeli society. For many, Bourekas films are a reminder of the potential in humor and storytelling to foster unity and empathy.

== Themes ==
The main theme in most Bourekas films is the conflict between ethnic cultures in Israel, in particular between the Mizrahi Jews and the Ashkenazi Jews, and in colonialist terms, between the "third world" (Mizrahi) and the "first world" (Ashkenazic). The protagonist is usually a Mizrahi Jewish man, almost always poor, canny and with street smarts, who comes into conflict with the institutions of the state or figures of Ashkenazi origin—mostly portrayed as rich, conceited, stuck-up, cold-hearted and alienated. In many of these films, actors imitate different Hebrew accents, especially that of Jews originating from Morocco, Persia, and Poland. They employ slapstick humour, alternative identities and a combination of comedy and melodrama.

Zuckermann (2005) argues that although "burekas films like Snooker (Boaz Davidson 1975) and Hakham Gamliel (Joel Silberg 1974) are regarded by many as the epitome of Mizrahi culture, [they] are hybridic and modelled upon Ashkenazic shtetl life as in Kuni Lemel (Two Kuni Lemels a.k.a. The Flying Matchmaker) and shtetl Kabtsiel in Mendele Moykher Sforim's Beemek Habakha." (Note: Beémek Habakhá ("In the Vale of Tears"): Yiddish title: "Dos vintshfingerl" ("The Wishing Ring"))

In a book entitled "Israeli Bourekas Films: their Origins and Legacy"(2023), the scholar Rami Kimchi claims that the portrayal of Israeli Mizrahi communities in these films bears a strong resemblance to the portrayal of the 19th century East European shtetl by classic Yiddish writers Kimchi attributes the commercial success of these films to their "hybridity", i.e. they were Israeli/Mizrahi and Diasporic/Ashkenazi at one and the same time, thereby satisfying the political, sociological, and psychological needs of both Mizrahi and Ashkenazi audiences in Israel. He believes eleven films produced between 1964 and 1977 make up the corpus of the genre. Kimchi also points out that the bourekas pattern has remained relevant to contemporary Israeli cinema and that there are two contemporary Israeli subgenres that are influenced by the historical Bourekas films: Neo Bourekas and Post Bourekas . Neo-Bourekas are films that innocently reproduce the paradigmatic representation of the Mizrahi neighborhood of the historical Bourekas films while adapting it to the current time and place, while Post-Bourekas are films that consciously copy several features of the aforementioned paradigmatic representation and exaggerate their performance to the point of creating a parody.

== Actors and directors ==
Bourekas films were highly successful in Israel during the 1960s and 1970s, but were also criticized for being shallow. Some of the main actors and directors were:

- Ze'ev Revach: an actor and director who participated in many popular Bourekas film comedies such as Hagiga B'Snuker (1975), Charlie Ve'hetzi (1974), Rak Hayom (1976), Gonev Mi'ganav Patoor (1977), Ta'ut Bamispar (1979), Ha-Muvtal Batito (1987), Lo La'alot Yoter (1979), Sapar Nashim (1984), Pa'amaim Buskila (1998), and more. Revach eventually became the person which is most identified with the Bourekas films and continued to create those films until the end of the 1980s.
- George Ovadiah: a director who created many melodramas which were influenced (and at times copied) from the Turkish cinema. The most prominent of his films are : Ariana (1971), Nurit (1972), Sarit (1974), West Side Girl (1979), and more. Obadiah also created comedies like Nahtche V'Hageneral (1972), Fishke Bemilu'im (1971) and Koreyim Li Shmil (1973).
- Yehuda Barkan: an actor and director who participated in many Bourekas films such as Lupo (1970) and Lupo B'New York (1976), Katz V'Carasso (1971), Charlie Ve'hetzi (1974), Hagiga B'Snuker (1975), Bo Nefotzetz Million (1977) and more. Barkan also played in the 1980s Abba Ganuv film series and directed them.
- Boaz Davidson: a director of many Bourekas film comedies such as Charlie Ve'hetzi (1974), Hagiga B'Snuker (1975), Mishpahat Tzan'ani (1976), and Lupo B'New York (1976). His films Charlie Ve'hetzi and Hagiga B'Snuker had a 'revival' in the 1990s and a status of Israeli cult film status.
- Yosef Shiloach: Played in several Bourekas film comedies, in parallel with a set of dramatic and more serious roles he played in a variety of Hollywood films. A character which is identified with him in particular is "the Persian"—a somewhat sensual grotesque who possesses a strong Persian accent.
- Tuvia Tzafir: Played in several Bourekas films, particularly in the role of the grotesque "Ashkenazi" character.
- Menahem Golan: a director and producer of many fiscally successful Bourekas films such as Fortuna (1966), My Margo (1969), Lupo (1970), Queen of the Road (Malkat haKvish) and The Contract (both 1971).
- Haim Topol: Starred in Sallah Shabati (1965) before his breakout Golden Globe-winning role in the 1971 film adaption of Fiddler on the Roof.

== Subgenres ==
Gefilte fish films (from "Gefilte fish"), also known as "bourekas for Ashkenazim", are a marginal group of Bourekas films that feature Ashkenazi protagonists and Jewish ghetto folklore. Some films in this subgenre include:

- Two Kuni Lemels (The Flying Matchmaker), 1966 (Israel Beker)
- Lupo, 1970 (Golan)
- Kuni Lemel in Tel Aviv, 1976
- Kuni Lemel in Cairo, 1983
- Lupo in New York (1976) (Davidson)
- Hershele, 1977 (Joel Silberg)
- Marriage Tel Aviv Style, 1979 (Joel Silberg)
- Aunt Klara (HaDoda Klara), 1977 (Avraham Heffner)

== Notable films ==
Several prominent Bourekas films are listed below in chronological order of production.

- Sallah Shabbati (1964)—directed by Kishon and the first Israeli film to be nominated for an Academy Award
- Fortuna (1966)—directed by Menahem Golan
- Moishe Vintelator (1966)—directed by Uri Zohar
- Aliza Mizrahi (1967)—directed by Menahem Golan
- Two Kuni Lemels (The Flying Matchmaker), 1966 (Israel Beker)
- Our Neighborhood (HaShkhuna Shelanu) (1968)—directed by Uri Zohar
- My Margo (1969)—directed by Menahem Golan
- Queen of the Road (Malkat haKvish) (1971)
- Fifty-Fifty (1971)
- The Contract (1971)—directed by Menahem Golan
- Salomonico (1972)
- Ha-Meshahnei'a Ba'am (1973)
- Haham Gamliel (1973)
- Kazablan (1974)—a story of a young Mizrahi man who falls in love with an Ashkenazi girl, starring Yehoram Gaon
- Charlie Va'Hetzi (1974) Directed by Boaz Davidson
- Hagiga B'Snuker (1975) Directed by Boaz Davidson
- Yi'ihiyeh Tov Salmonico (1975)—with Reuven Bar-Yotam
- Kuni Lemel in Tel Aviv, 1976
- Mishpachat Tesanani (1976) Directed by Boaz Davidson
- Kuni Lemel in Cairo, 1983
