= Joel Silberg =

Film, television and stage director and screenwriter

- יואל זילברג
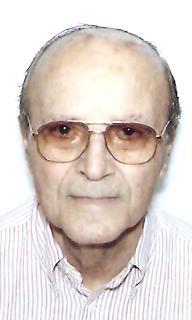
- Born: 30 March 1927; Tel Aviv, Mandatory Palestine
- Died: 18 February 2013 (aged 85); Tel Aviv, Israel
- Other names: Yoel Silberg; Joel Zilberg
- Occupations: Director; screenwriter
- Years active: 1949-2013
- Children: 3
- Parent: Ben Zion Silberg

Joel Silberg (Hebrew: יואל זילברג; 30 March 1927 – 18 February 2013) was a film, television and stage director and screenwriter in Israel and the United States. He made films in Israel including so-called Bourekas films. He then directed films in the U.S. during the 1980s, including Breakin' and Lambada. Both have been described as exploitation films. In 2008 he received the Lifetime Achievement Award from the Israel Film Academy.

== Biography ==
Silberg was born in Palestine in 1927. He was the son of actor Ben Zion Silberg. He began his career directing at London's Old Vic theater. He co-wrote the Israeli musical film Kazablan (1974).

Breakin' was shot in Los Angeles and reflects a different style of break dancing and street dance culture than the Bronx, New York film Beat Street. Roger Ebert gave Breakin' 1 1/2 stars, stating that it was a rather predictable story. The sequel, Breakin' 2: Electric Boogaloo, directed by Sam Firstenberg, was released 7 months later, and was a Cannon Films productions. It received poor critical reception. Later on, the subtitle "Electric Boogaloo" would enter the pop-culture lexicon as a snowclone pejorative nickname to denote an archetypical sequel.

Author Kimberly Monteyne referred to films such as Rappin' as "hip hop-oriented exploitation extravaganzas".

Silberg died on February 18, 2013, in Israel, aged 85.

== Filmography ==
- True Story of Palestine (Etz O Palestina) (1962), directed along with Uri Zohar and Nathan Axelrod
- Mishpahat Simhon (1964)
- Haham Gamliel (1973)
- Kuni Lemel in Tel Aviv (1976)
- Hershele (1977)
- Millioner Betzarot (1978)
- Imi Hageneralit (1979)
- Marriage Tel Aviv Style (1979)
- Kuni Lemel in Cairo (1983)
- Breakin' (1984)
- Rappin' (1985)
- Bad Guys (1986), starring Adam Baldwin
- Catch the Heat (also known as Sin escape, 1987), starring Tiana Alexandra and Rod Steiger
- Lambada (1990)
- Prison Heat (1993)
