= Hasamba Generation 3 =

2010–2013 Israeli TV series

- Genre: Comedy-Drama
- Created by: Dror Nobleman; Ruty Zaid
- Written by: Dror Nobleman; Ruty Zaid; Yigal Mossinson (Characters)
- Directed by: Danny Sirkin
- Starring: Oded Kotler; Nira Rabinovitz; Moti Giladi; Gabi Amrani; Hugo Yarden; Yair (Koya) Rubin; Tzipi Shavit; Shay Lee Hirsh; Tomer Ofner; Itay Turgeman; Yulia Plotkin; Sivan Presler; Dorit Bar-Or; Yehuda Levi; Ze'ev Revach; Aki Avni; Miki Geva
- Theme music composer: Gal Toren; Dudush Klemesh
- Opening theme: "Hasamba" by Lukach
- Country of origin: Israel
- Original language: Hebrew
- No. of seasons: 2
- No. of episodes: 30

Production
- Producer: Eylon Ratzkovsky
- Running time: approx. 30 minutes
- Production company: July August Productions

Original release
- Network: Arutz HaYeladim (HOT), HOT3
- Release: October 2, 2010 – November 6, 2013

Hasamba Generation 3 (Hebrew: חסמבה דור 3, romanized: Hasamba Dor 3) is a television series that broadcast on the Israeli channels HOT3 and Arutz HaYeladim.

"Hasamba" is a fictional children's group from the eponymous children's adventure novel series by Yigal Mossinson.

== Plot ==
The name is a pun: "dor 3" refers to both the third generation, i.e., grandparents, and the 3G technology of cell phones.

The TV series tells the story of Hasamba over 50 years after its creation, when they are around the age of 70. Tamar and Yaron married and they had a son named Uri, who was killed for some reason (so they think). Their granddaughter, Renen, lived with them after the death of her father. The real story on Renen's father, was revealed in the first episode: Sunny Zorkin, CEO of Israel's largest cellular communications company, "Zorcom", grabbed it after guarding state secrets. In a failed attempt to change his memoirs, escaping one of the scientists in order to Tamar Zehavi the information was shelved her all that much years. Sonny sends a group of kidnappers to abduct the Tamar. Yaron, who finds it, tries to unify Hasamba.

Thus the 70-year-old Hasamba gets dragged back into the action one by one. But they're not alone: Several guys and girls of the younger and fresher generation: Yuval, Luda, Iggy, Chofni and Renen find themselves involved and become Hasamba's third-generation counterparts.
