= The Contract (1971 film) =

1971 Israeli film directed by Menahem Golan

The Contract (Hebrew: כַּץ וְקָרַסוֹ Katz VeKarasso, lit. Katz and Karasso) is a 1971 Israeli comedy film directed and written by Menahem Golan and produced by Yoram Globus. The film is in the Bourekas film genre. It sold 885,000 tickets and is the 6th most-watched Israeli film ever.

== Plot ==
Ashkenazi Shmuel Katz (Shmuel Rodensky) and Sephardi Kasosh Carasso (Joseph Shiloach) are feuding insurance brokers, competing for a big oil insurance contract. Katz has two daughters, the older Naomi (Efrat Lavie) and the younger Tiki (Nitza Shaul), while Carraso has two sons, Joseph (Osi) (Yehuda Barkan) and Eliyahu (Yahu) (Gadi Yagil). In order to win the contract, Katz sends his Naomi while Carasso sends Osi to Eilat in order to seduce the womanizing Mr. Israel Israeli (Yehuda Efroni). While Mr. Israeli pursues Daniela, a friend of Osi (Tzipi Levine) the two connect and fall for each other.

In the meantime, in Tel Aviv, Yahu, who still lives with his parents and strives to have his own place, runs away from home and finds himself stranded in a coffeehouse, where he is harassed by a group of young partiers. He is saved by Tiki, who shelters him for the night. Mr. Israeli arrives to Tel Aviv, where he expects to party and is promised a good time by both Naomi and Osi, although the two set a date for themselves and abandon Mr. Israeli on his own. Tiki and Eliyahu set a party for their friends in Osi's apartment, which Mr. Israeli joins.
When both Katz and Carraso find about their offsprings connecting, both react angrily. Katz, along with Mr. Israeli's wife crash the party and Tiki and Eliyahu run away on his bike then, once it breaks down, they hitch-hike their way to Eilat, while Osi and Naomi continue their date with an all-night drive in the same direction.
Tiki and Eliyahu find themselves in a Hippie village where they are arrested by the police in accusation of using drugs. Upon learning of their arrest both families head to Eilat to save their children, while the fathers quarrel on the way. The two youngsters are released from police custody and while preparing for the journey back north, the families meet Mr. Israeli who notifies them that Osi and Naomi are having an engagement party at the hippie Nelson Village in Taba. At the party Mr. Israeli negotiates a truce between Katz and Carraso, and while the two close the deal, he is approached by a beautiful woman, a representative of a third insurance broker, Shimshon.

== Cast ==
Carraso family:

- Yosef Shiloach as Kadosh Carraso
- Esther Greenberg as Sarina Carraso
- Yehuda Barkan as Yosef "Osi" Carraso
- Gadi Yagil as Eliyahu "Yahu" Carraso

Katz family:

- Shmuel Rodensky as Shmuel Katz
- Lea Koenig as Fania Katz
- Efrat Lavie as Naomi Katz
- Nitza Shaul as Tikva "Tiki" Katz

Other roles:

- Yehuda Efroni as Mr. Israel Israeli
- Leah Dolitzkaya as Shoshana Israeli, Mr. Israeli's wife
- Tzipi Levine as Daniela
- Mona Silberstein as secretary
- Rafi Nelson as himself
- Tikva Mor as Shimshon representative

== See also ==
- Cinema of Israel
- Bourekas film
