= West Side Girl =

- Directed by: George Ovadiah
- Screenplay by: Bezalel Aloni; Michael Shvili
- Produced by: Michael Shvili; Benni Shvily
- Starring: Ofra Haza; Uri Selah; Menahem Einy; Avner Dan
- Edited by: Zion Avrahamian
- Music by: Shaike Feikov
- Production company: Na'arat Haparvarim Ltd.
- Release dates: February 19, 1979 (worldwide); April 5, 1979 (United States)
- Running time: 94 minutes
- Countries: Israel; United States
- Language: Hebrew

West Side Girl (Hebrew: נערת הפרברים, Na'arat Haparvarim) is a 1979 Israeli drama film directed by George Ovadiah, and starring Ofra Haza, It sold 114,000 tickets in Israel.

== Plot ==
Vered (Ofra Haza) is a beautiful blind girl who sells chocolates and cigarettes in the streets. Vered is a gifted singer. She meets three young men who become her friends and help raise money for surgery to restore her sight. When one of them steals the money, the other two are arrested, and the third takes her to the hospital. After the surgery, Vered regains her vision. When her friends are released from prison and search for her, they find her performing in a music event in Jerusalem. Although she had never seen them before, she instantly recognizes them and is overjoyed to see them.

== Cast ==
- Ofra Haza as Vered
- Uri Selah as Avi
- Menahem Einy as Chucho
- Avner Dan as Susita
- Ruth Bikel as Ruthie
- Reuven Dayyan as Yechezkel

== See also ==
- Bourekas film
- Cinema of Israel
