= Nurit (film) =

Nurit (Hebrew: נורית) is a 1972 Israeli drama film written, produced and directed by George Ovadiah. It sold 702,000 tickets and is the 13th most watched Israeli film ever.

In 1983 the sequel, Nurit 2 was released.

== Plot ==
Shoshana (Yona Elian), a rich young woman from Tiberias loves Moshe (Sasi Keshet), a poor truck driver from Tel Aviv. They intend to marry, but Nissim, her father (Jacques Cohen), forbids it. They intend to take advantage of Nissim's business trip to Argentina to fulfill their romantic wishes. But an unfortunate mishap happens when Shoshana hears on the radio that Moshe has been involved in an accident and she thinks he was killed. She sets off to the Sea of Galilee, planning to commit suicide like her mother did years ago. At the last minute she changes her mind. She is hit by a car driven by three musicians and loses her eyesight. The three men take care of her and Nurit, her young baby from Moshe. They become street entertainers: the men play music, Shoshana sings and Nurit dances. Meanwhile Moshe changes his name to Mike and becomes a famous singer. Shoshana eventually has eye surgery, regains her eyesight, and marries Mike.

== See also ==
- Cinema of Israel
- Bourekas film
