= Kuni Lemel in Cairo =

- קוני למל בקהיר
- Directed by: Joel Silberg
- Starring: Mike Burstyn, Hana Laszlo, Moshe Ivgy, Avraham Mor, Uri Gavriel
- Music by: Kobi Oshrat
- Release date: 1983
- Country: Israel

Kuni Lemel in Cairo (Hebrew: קוני למל בקהיר) is a 1983 Israeli family comedy film directed by Yoel Zilberg, with lyrics by Avi Koren. The film stars Mike Burstyn in a dual role and is the third and final installment in the Kuni Lemel trilogy, following Two Kuni Lemels and Kuni Lemel in Tel Aviv. The film became a cult classic in Israel.

== Plot ==
Kuni Lemel (Mike Burstyn) is a Hasidic teacher working with newly observant Jews in a religiously conservative community. A widower, he lives with his two children. His secular identical twin brother, Moni, is an entertainer and theater performer who stages shows together with his girlfriend Yona (Hana Laszlo).

When a valuable Torah scroll is set to be delivered to the Jewish community in Cairo in exchange for rare coins worth one million dollars, Moni's boss Sasi (Moshe Ivgy) devises a scheme to intercept the payment. He kidnaps Kuni and sends Moni in his place, disguised as his religious twin, to collect the money. To prepare the ground, the criminals send Yona undercover as a pious Hasidic relative of Kuni's, allowing her to gain his trust and help care for his children. Moni travels to Cairo, receives the payment, and escapes back to hand it over, while Kuni manages to escape captivity on his own. When Kuni brings the coins to his grandfather, it emerges that they are counterfeit; the real payment had already been sent directly to the yeshiva and to his grandfather via diplomatic mail.
