= The Battle of Sinai (film) =

Italian produced film

The Battle of Sinai or Five Days in Sinai is an Italian produced film released in Italy and Israel in 1968 under the title of "La Battaglia Del Sinai" and released in an English-dubbed version in 1969. It was directed by Maurizio Lucidi. It stars Ze'ev Revach, Assi Dayan, Carlo De Mejo, Daniele Dublino and Franco Giornelli. Female leads are Mavie Bardanzellu and Katia Christine.

== Plot ==
The docu-drama style film follows the Six-Day War between Egypt and Israel, primarily as seen from the Israeli perspective. The story line jumps between locations in Jerusalem, Tel Aviv, Haifa and the Sinai desert.

The main military character Rafi (Franco Giornelli), a captain in the Israeli army, wishes to leave Jerusalem and go to the United States to work as an engineer, and he tells his military girlfriend Alek (Daniele Dublino). He praises Moshe Dayan the Israeli leader. Meanwhile, his civilian counterpart Ylan (Carlo de Mejo), the son of a shipbuilder, lives the life of a playboy at the poolside, before joining his battalion.

In a scene later copied in American Graffiti two cars charge head on at each other in a game of chicken watched by a crowd of teenagers. Two of the men are later part of the battle. Meanwhile, a battalion of tanks is lined up facing the border. Koffi and other officers are briefed on the plan of attack. Outside Jossi (Assi Dayan the son of Moshe Dayan), one of the troops meets his military girlfriend Lails (Katia Christine).

The attack begins with an air force strike into enemy territory. The tanks then move forward into the Sinai Peninsula. A tank battle begins with the Egyptian army. rafi acts as a spotter placed in a jeep above the battlefield.

Alek and Laila search for their boyfriends from a helicopter, viewing the devastation of burned out vehicles along the road. They find them. An Egyptian soldier fires on the group and blows up the helicopter before being killed. The group then have to walk out of the battlefield. On the long journey they spot a SAM-2 missile base being created. In the base the Egyption colonel (Gideon Singer) plans his defence.

Saadia (Ze'ev Revach) and one of the others capture an outlying guard position on the edge of the base. One of the men who can speak Arabic removes his Israeli uniform and acts as a decoy to put another guard out of action. All seven men then attack the base and capture the colonel. Laila hears the gunfire and grabs a gun to help out. She kills two men and is overcome with emotion.

They raise an improvised Israeli flag over the camp.

The Egyptian command plans to recapture the base or to destroy the missiles captured by the Israelis. The men who escaped the base say they were greatly outnumbered by the Israelis (which they were not). Two armoured cars full of troops are sent back to the base. The Israelis take out one with an RPG. Ylan and another mount a heavy machine gun on a jeep and play chicken with the remaining armoured car, driving it back. Saadia is killed defending the base but the Egyptians are driven off.

Rafi and the Egyptian colonel philosophise about the right of Israel to exist. A large group of mainly unarmed soldiers appear looking for water and they oblige. The Egyptian colonel's assistant runs forward and tells the group to attack the Israelis as they are very few. He starts pouring the water away. They attack and kill him and leave quietly with the water.

The radio announces the end of the conflict and the film ends with true life footage of Moshe Dayan and the aftermath of the conflict.
