= Alfred Steinhardt =

Israeli filmmaker (1923–2012)

Alfred Steinhardt (Hebrew: אלפרד שטיינהרדט; June 1, 1923 – 2012) was an Israeli film director. His work includes shorts, documentaries, training films, and at least six feature films. He filmed a state-sponsored reenactment of the Six Day War that was released in 1968. His 1972 film Salomonico is a so-called Bourekas film and spawned the 1975 sequel The Father.

== Filmography ==
- Hill 24 Doesn't Answer (1955), one of the assistant directors
- The Long Frontier (1966)
- The Six Day War (1967), director, credited as consultant
- Ha-Ben Ha'Oved (Hebrew: הבן העובד, lit. "The Prodigal Son") (1968) co-directed with Yosef Shalhin
- Salomonico / Salomoniko (1972)
- Haaba (1975)
- The Father (1975), a sequel to Salomoniko
- A Movie and Breakfast (1977)
- Messagest Hatzameret (1981)
- Az Men Git, Nemt Men (1982)
