= The Farewell Party =

2014 film

- Film poster
- מיתה טובה
- Directed by: Tal Granit; Sharon Maymon
- Written by: Tal Granit; Sharon Maymon
- Starring: Ze'ev Revach
- Music by: Avi Belleli
- Release dates: August 2014 (Italy); 10 October 2014 (Israel)
- Running time: 95 minutes
- Country: Israel
- Language: Hebrew

The Farewell Party (Hebrew: מיתה טובה Mita Tova) is a 2014 Israeli drama film about the use of a euthanasia device, directed by Tal Granit and Sharon Maymon. It was nominated for the Ophir Award for Best Film. The film was screened in the Venice Days section of the 71st Venice International Film Festival and has been selected to be screened in the Contemporary World Cinema section at the 2014 Toronto International Film Festival. The film was also screened in the 44th edition of the International Film Festival Rotterdam, reaching the second place in the IFFR audience award.

A group of friends in an assisted living facility in Jerusalem, led by Yehezkel (Zeev Revah), builds a euthanasia device to help their sick friend. As rumours of the device spreads, more requests for help reach the group.

== Cast ==
- Ze'ev Revach as Yehezkel
- Aliza Rosen as Yana
- Raffi Tavor as Rafi
- Levana Finkelstein as Levana
- Ilan Dar as Dr. Daniel

== Awards and nominations ==
- Brian Award at the 71st Venice International Film Festival.
