= Desperado Square =

2001 film directed by Benny Torati

- כיכר המיואשים
- Directed by: Benny Toraty
- Written by: Benny Toraty
- Produced by: Amir Harel, Haim Manor
- Starring: Joseph Shiloach; Yona Elian; Mohammed Bakri; Uri Gavriel; Nir Levy; Ayelet Zurer
- Music by: Shem Tov Levi
- Release date: 10 May 2001
- Running time: 95 minutes
- Country: Israel
- Language: Israeli

Desperado Square (Hebrew: כיכר המיואשים) is an Israeli film written and directed by Benny Toraty. The film was released in 2001. The film received financial support from the Yehoshua Rabinovitz Foundation for the Arts in Tel Aviv.

That year, the film participated in the Ophir Awards and won 5 categories, including Best Director (Benny Toraty) and Best Supporting Actor (Yosef Shiloach). In addition, the film won first place at the Mediterranean Film Festival in Montpellier, France, and the Screenplay Award at the Valencia Festival in Spain. It was featured in many cultural events in Israel and worldwide and opened the Israeli Film Festival in Hong Kong.

The film's music, composed by Shem Tov Levi.

== Plot ==
The film depicts the life of a struggling southern neighborhood in Tel Aviv, where a cinema once served as the cultural hub and a place that gathered the dreams of its residents.

On the anniversary of the death of Morris Mendavon, the former owner of the cinema, his son Nissim (Nir Levi) dreams a dream in which his deceased father commands him to reopen the cinema, which was closed 25 years ago. As a result, the Mendavon brothers, Nissim and George (Sharon Reginiano), decide, despite the opposition of their mother Seniora (Yona Elian), to screen the classic Indian film "Sangam," starring Bollywood icon Raj Kapoor. However, before they can do so, they must search for and find who holds a rare copy of the film. All the neighborhood residents get caught up in the adventure, during which the brothers uncover details about their family and their past that they had not known before.

== Cast ==
- Yosef Shiloach
- Yona Elian
- Mohammed Bakri
- Uri Gavriel
- Nir Levy
- Ayelet Zurer

== Festivals and awards ==
- Montpellier Film Festival, France 2001 - Antigone d'Or
- Israeli Academy Awards 2001 - Best Director, Best Supporting Actor, Best Art Direction, Best Costume, Best Original Music
- Valencia Film Festival, Spain 2002 - Best Script
