= The Man Who Flew in to Grab =

- Directed by: Prosper Priente
- Written by: Screenplay; Prosper Priente; Ze'ev Revach; Meir Wieseltier
- Produced by: Amatsia Hiuni
- Starring: Ze'ev Revach; Yossi Virzhansky; Miri Zamir; Assi Dayan; Moni Moshonov; Aryeh Moskona
- Cinematography: David Gurfinkel
- Edited by: Danny Shick
- Music by: Nachum Heiman
- Release date: 1982
- Running time: 80 minutes
- Country: Israel
- Language: Hebrew

The Man Who Flew in to Grab (Hebrew: האיש שבא לקחת) is a 1982 Israeli comedy film directed by Prosper Priente. The script was co-written by Priente, Ze'ev Revach, and Meir Wieseltier. The film, which stars Ze'ev Revach, Yossi Virzhansky, Miri Zamir, Assi Dayan, Moni Moshonov and Aryeh Moskona , is a political farce that critiques the greed, corruption, and political opportunism prevalent in Israel during the early 1980s.

== Plot ==
The film is set in Israel during the early 1980s during a period characterized by political and economic turbulence in the country. The film revolves around a high-stakes scheme to manipulate the Tel Aviv Stock Exchange. A corrupt businessman named Geffen devises a plan to cash out his shares, purchase a suitcase filled with diamonds, and escape the country, leaving financial ruin behind.

However, his carefully crafted scheme is disrupted by his wife, who conspires to steal the diamonds for herself. She enlists the help of her lover, who also happens to be the businessman’s lawyer.

Meanwhile, a French conman named Raboa (portrayed by Ze'ev Revach) arrives in Israel, presenting himself as a wealthy investor with substantial real estate holdings. Under the guise of contributing to Israel's development, he gambles the money in the stock market, causing it to evaporate and triggering a financial scandal.

In a bizarre twist of fate, the French conman’s misdeeds inadvertently propel him into Israeli politics, where he unexpectedly campaigns for a seat in the Knesset.

== Cast ==
- Ze'ev Revach as Raboa, the French conman
- Yossi Virzhansky as Geffen, the corrupt businessman
- Miri Zamir as Miri, the corrupt businessman’s wife
- Assi Dayan as Zivish, the lawyer and wife’s lover
- Moni Moshonov as Beber
- Aryeh Moscona as Marco
