= Yigal Mossinson =

Israeli writer and inventor

- יגאל מוסינזון
- Yigal Mossinson, 1954
- Born: 25 December 1917; Ein Ganim, Occupied Enemy Territory Administration
- Died: May 1, 1994 (aged 76); Tel Aviv, Israel
- Citizenship: Israeli
- Occupations: Novelist, playwright, and inventor
- Spouse: 3
- Children: 6, including Gili
- Relatives: Moshe Mossinson (brother); Dvora Omer (niece)

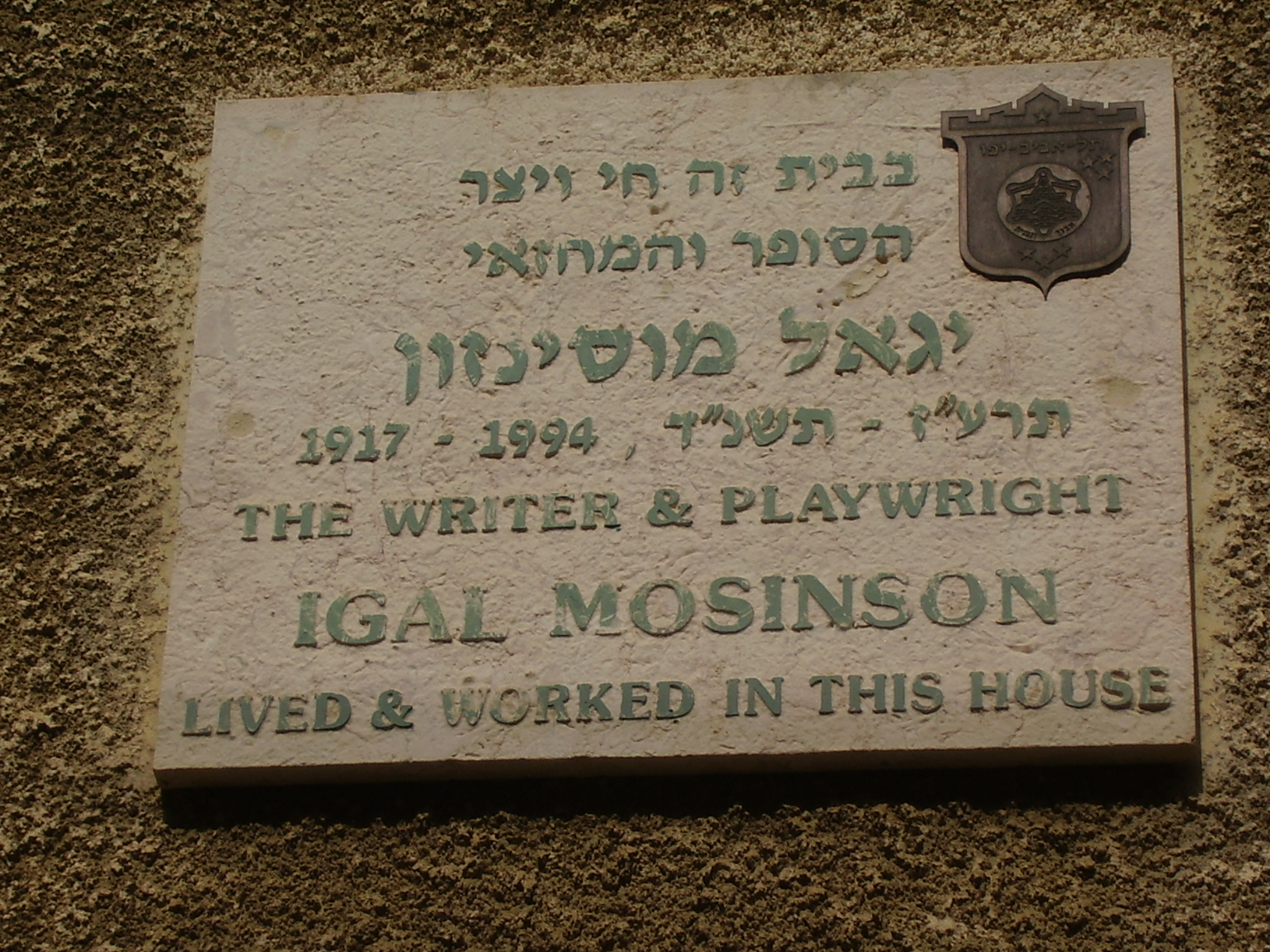
Memorial plaque on Mossinson's home in Tel Aviv

Yigal Mossinson (Hebrew: יגאל מוסינזון; 25 December 1917 – 1 May 1994), also known as Igal Mossinsohn, Yigal Mosenzon and Yig'al Mosinzon, was an Israeli novelist, playwright, and inventor. He was the author of the Hasamba children's book series.

Among his many awards was the David's Violin Prize for Casablan, the 1954 play upon which the Israeli musical comedy stage and screen hit Kazablan was based.

== Biography ==
Mossinson, son of Asher Mossinson and his wife Dvora, was born in Ottoman Palestine in 1917, in the moshav Ein Ganim, located near Petah Tikva; he grew up in Tel Aviv. Later on Mossinson studied in Beit Alfa and in the youth village of Ben Shemen. Afterward he moved to the Kibbutz Na'an, where he lived from 1938 to 1950. In 1943 Mossinson joined the Palmach. During that period Mossinson was arrested by the British and imprisoned in Latrun. In 1944 Mossinson published his first story in the newspaper Al HaMishmar. During the 1948 Arab–Israeli War Mossinson served as a cultural officer in the Givati unit.

In 1953, following the publication of the novel A Man's Way (Hebrew: דֶּרֶךְ גֶּבֶר), Mossinson had to leave the kibbutz; he moved to Moshav Beit Shearim. From 1952 Mossinson served for a year and a half as a press spokesman for the Israeli police and afterward as the spokesman for the Habima Theatre.

In 1957 Mossinson founded the Sadan Theatre in the Mughrabi Hall. The theatre went bankrupt eventually and closed. In 1959 Mossinson moved to the United States where he pursued various businesses for a living. During this period he helped adapt the play Casablan for the screen, with a film version (filmed in Greece) released in 1964. In 1965 Mossinson returned to live in Israel, where he began his literary career.

During the last years of his life Mossinson began developing a number of inventions, including a vehicle for cleaning pavements.

== Family ==
Mossinson had two children from his first marriage (to Leah Weleminsky), two children from his second marriage, and two children from his third marriage. His first son, Uri, died in infancy. His second son, Avital Mossinsohn (1939–1994), was director of the Jerusalem Theatre. Another son, Ido (1941–1973), was killed in the 1973 Arab-Israeli War. Yigal's son Jonathan Soroko (1958–2013) was a lawyer in the United States and a co-founder of Popular Logistics. Mossinson fathered two children in his sixties – a daughter, Renen (born 1977) and a son, Gili Mossinson (born 1978), who is a professional basketball player.

One of Yigal Mossinson's brothers was the Israeli author Moshe Mossinson and his niece, the daughter of Moshe Mossinson, is the Israeli author Dvora Omer.

== Works ==
Mossinson's first story was published in 1944, and in 1950 the first volume of his Hasamba children's adventure stories was published. The series, which eventually included 45 stories, won him "national acclaim" as a children's author.

=== Books published in Hebrew ===
In addition to his more than 40 children's stories, his works for adults include:

- The Shepherds' Backpack (stories in 4 volumes), 1944 [Yalkut Haroim]
- Gray as a Sack (stories), Sifriat Poalim, 1946 [Aforim Ka-Sak]
- Tamar, Wife of Er, Tarshish, 1947 [Tamar Eshet Er]
- In the Negev Plains, Twersky, 1948 [Be-Arvot Ha-Negev]
- Who Said He's Black? (novel), Sifriat Poalim, 1948 [Mi Amar She-Hu Shahor]
- The Road to Jericho (novel), Sifriat Poalim, 1950 [Ha-Derech Le-Yeriho]
- With a Wise Man (play), Twersky, 1951
- If There Is Justice (play), Twersky, 1951 [Im Yesh Tzedek]
- A Man's Way (stories), Twersky, 1953 [Derech Gever]
- Stories, Twersky, 1954 [Sipurei Igal Mossinsohn]
- Throw Him to the Dogs (play), Gadish, 1958 [Zerok Oto La-Klavim]
- Breaking the Vessels (novel), Ohel, 1959 [Shovrim Et Ha-Kelim]
- Judas (novel), Am Oved, 1963 [Yehuda Ish Krayot]
- El Dorado (stories), Tirosh, 1963 [Eldorado]
- About Women and Men (stories), Tcherikover, 1970 [Al Nashim Ve-Al Gevarim]
- Cherchez la Femme (stories), Tcherikover, 1971
- Women Grow Horns, La`eesha, 1972 [Nasheem Matzmichot Karnaeem]
- Long Live the Little Difference (novel), Tcherikover, 1974 [Yehi Ha-Hevdel Hakatan]
- Tarantella (novel), Ramdor, 1979
- The Spies in Rachav's Bourdel (play), Shalgi, 1980 [Ha-Meraglim Ba-Burdel Shel Rahav Ha-Zona]
- A Selection of Hot Stories, Ramdor, 1981 [Mivhar Sipurim Lohatim]
- A Death Kiss in Bed (play), Or Am, 1991 [Mitat Neshikah Ba-Mita]

=== Plays ===
Among Mossinson's plays that were performed on stage are:

- Tamar, Wife of Er (Ohel Theater, 1952)
- In the Negev Plains (Habima Theatre, 1948)
- A Day After the War (Hamatateh, 1950)
- Tower of Babel (Hamatateh, 1951)
- The Nameless Man (Fridman, 1953)
- Cambyses (1955)
- El Dorado (Ohel Theater, 1955)
- Shulamit (musical) (Do-Re-Me, 1956)
- Throw Him to the Dogs (Habima Theatre, 1958)
- The Narcotics Addict (Sadan)
- Casablan (Cameri Theater, 1954—later, the basis for the musical, Kazablan)
- Notes in the Hat (Zira, 1958)
- The Black Sabbath (Ohel Theater, 1959)
- A Happy Evening in Park Avenue (Haifa Theatre, 1965)
- Breaking the Vessels (Ohel Theater, 1968)
- Shimshon (Samson) (Habima Theatre, 1969).

== Awards ==
His many awards and recognitions include the Prime Minister's Prize for Literature, the Ussishkin Prize for A Man's Way, the Cleveland Prize for Cambyses and the David's Violin Prize for Casablan.

He was included on an Israeli postage stamp in 2004.

== See also ==
- Hasamba – Mossinson's children's book series
