= Hagiga B'Snuker =

- Directed by: Boaz Davidson
- Written by: Screenplay; Eli Tavor; Story; Uri Dan
- Produced by: Simcha Zvuloni
- Starring: Yehuda Barkan; Yosef Shiloah; Ze'ev Revach
- Cinematography: David Gurfinkel
- Edited by: Alain Jakubowicz
- Music by: Matti Caspi
- Distributed by: Tal-Shahar
- Release date: 1975
- Running time: 95 minutes
- Country: Israel
- Language: Hebrew

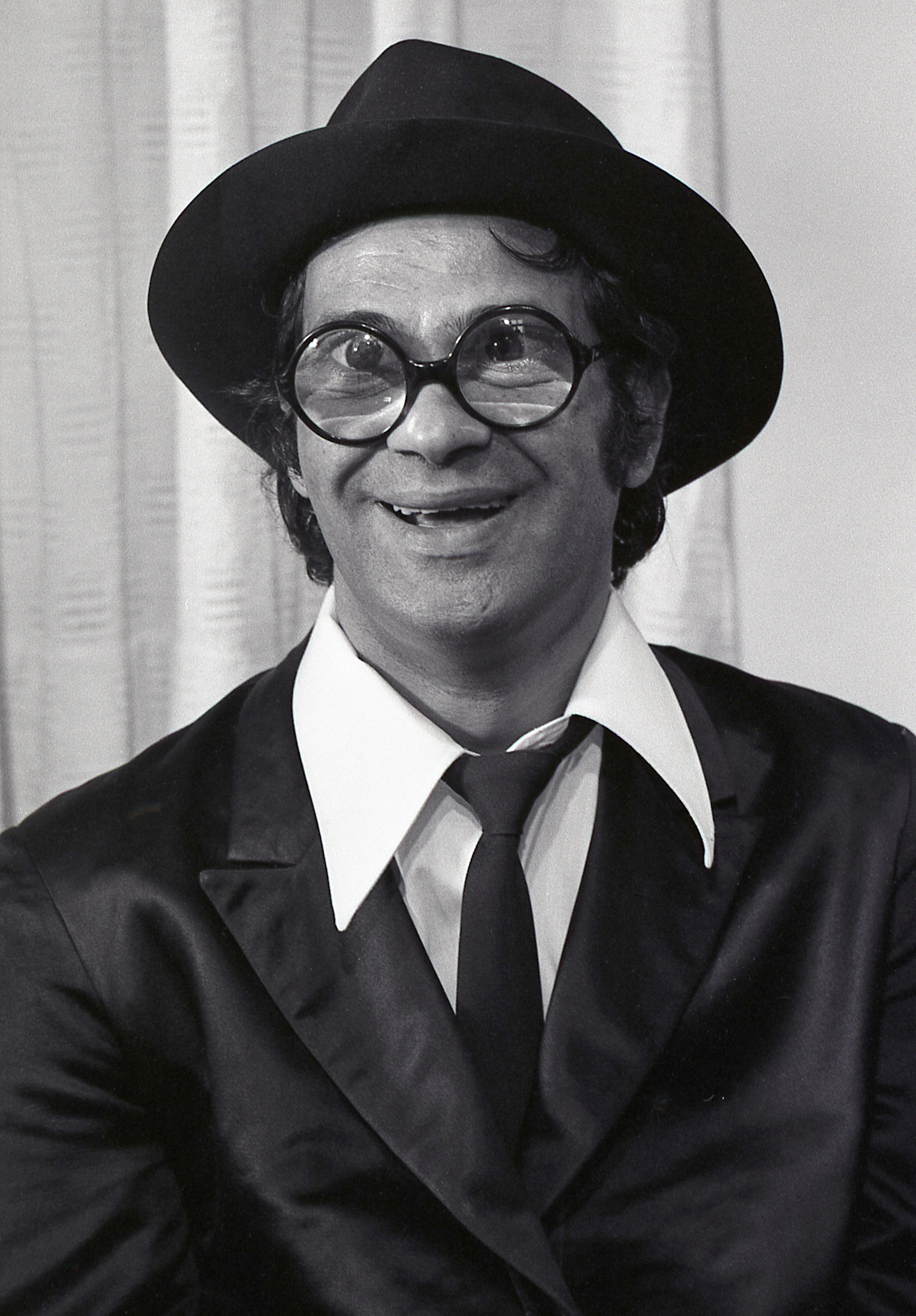
Ze'ev Revach in Hagiga B'Snuker

Hagiga Ba'Snuker (Hebrew: חגיגה בסנוקר, lit. Party at the Snooker; originally simply Snooker) is a 1975 classic Israeli Bourekas film, achieving a cult following among its fans. The movie was directed by Boaz Davidson and stars Israeli comedians Ze'ev Revach, Yehuda Barkan and Yosef Shiloah.

== Cast ==
- Yehuda Barkan – Gavriel (Gavri) Levi/Azriel Levi (Hebrew: גבריאל\עזריאל)
- Ze'ev Revach – Hannukah (Hebrew: חנוכה)
- Yosef Shiloach – Salvador (Hebrew: סלבדור)
- Nitza Shaul – Yona (Hebrew: יונה)
- Tuvia Tzafir – Mushon (Hebrew: מושון)
- Yaakov Banai – Rabbi Yosef Shemesh
- Arieh Elias – Halfon (Hebrew: חלפון)
- Abraham Ronai – The contractor (Hebrew: הקבלן)
- Talia Shapira – Riki (Hebrew: ריקי)
- Music by Matti Caspi

== Plot ==
The story is about two twin brothers, Azriel and Gavriel (both played by Yehuda Barkan and named after archangels) Azriel is a shy and religious Jew who works in a fruit shop in Jaffa. Gavriel is a hoodlum and hustler who runs a snooker bar. Gavriel and his friend Hanuka make easy money by swindling innocent people into gambling on snooker games. One day Gavriel is forced to renew contact with his brother, because he is in trouble with a gangster who won the bet on a snooker game, and the only way to pay is by selling the family estate which is co-owned by the two brothers.

== See also ==
- Charlie Ve'hetzi
