= Hasamba =

Children's adventure novels by Yigal Mossinson

Hasamba book cover

Hasamba (or Chasamba, Hebrew: חסמבה, an acronym for חבורת סוד מוחלט בהחלט; Havurat Sod Muchlat Behechlet; lit. "The Absolutely Absolute Secret Group") is a series of children's adventure novels written by Yigal Mossinson. The stories are a chronicle of the heroic exploits of a group of children from Tel Aviv as they assist the underground Haganah in its struggle for Israeli statehood against the British in Mandatory Palestine. Subsequent books revolve around assisting the security forces, including the IDF, against Israel's external and internal enemies. It became the most popular series of pocket books ever written in Israel (over a million copies sold), and part of Israeli culture.

== Plot summary ==
A group of girls and boys set up a secret society called "Hasamba"; their adventures take place, first during the British Mandate and the struggle for statehood of Israel, and then as they battle their country's enemies: infiltrators, spies, criminals and other offenders. The group takes an active part in the wars of Israel during the period of writing (until 1994). Though suspenseful, the writing is entertaining, with humor, as well as with related science, history, and trivia information, provided by knowledgeable participating characters. It emphasizes kindness, good behavior, loyalty, friendship, dedication, courage, and love to Israel.

Yaron Zahavi (the handsome guy) and his deputy, Tamar (the pretty girl), are the first leaders of Hasamba. In later books (where they are supposed to be much older) they are replaced by the younger Yoav Tzur and his deputy, Rachel. The other heroes are replaced as well. Years later Yaron and Tamar get married, and their son Uri joins Hasamba in book number 25.

In the books they face dangerous and smart enemies. They fight them, occasionally become captives, but outsmart the enemies and get free, sometimes with help of allies, and finally win. Though not always with a happy end: Two of the first-generation heroes, Eliahu Hermon and Refael Kaduri die, sacrificing their lives for important causes.

Their secret meeting place is a real location in Tel Aviv, known as "The Electric Cave", which upon returning from a long stay abroad, the author discovered to be destroyed for the sake of building the Tel Aviv Hilton Hotel. High-tech inventions, sometimes preceding the technology available when written about, plays role in the stories. This includes the Electric cave, an intelligent robot, "Zagloba," that helps the group in some adventures, a laser rifle, and more (Yigal Mossinson himself was the inventor of patents).

== Characters ==
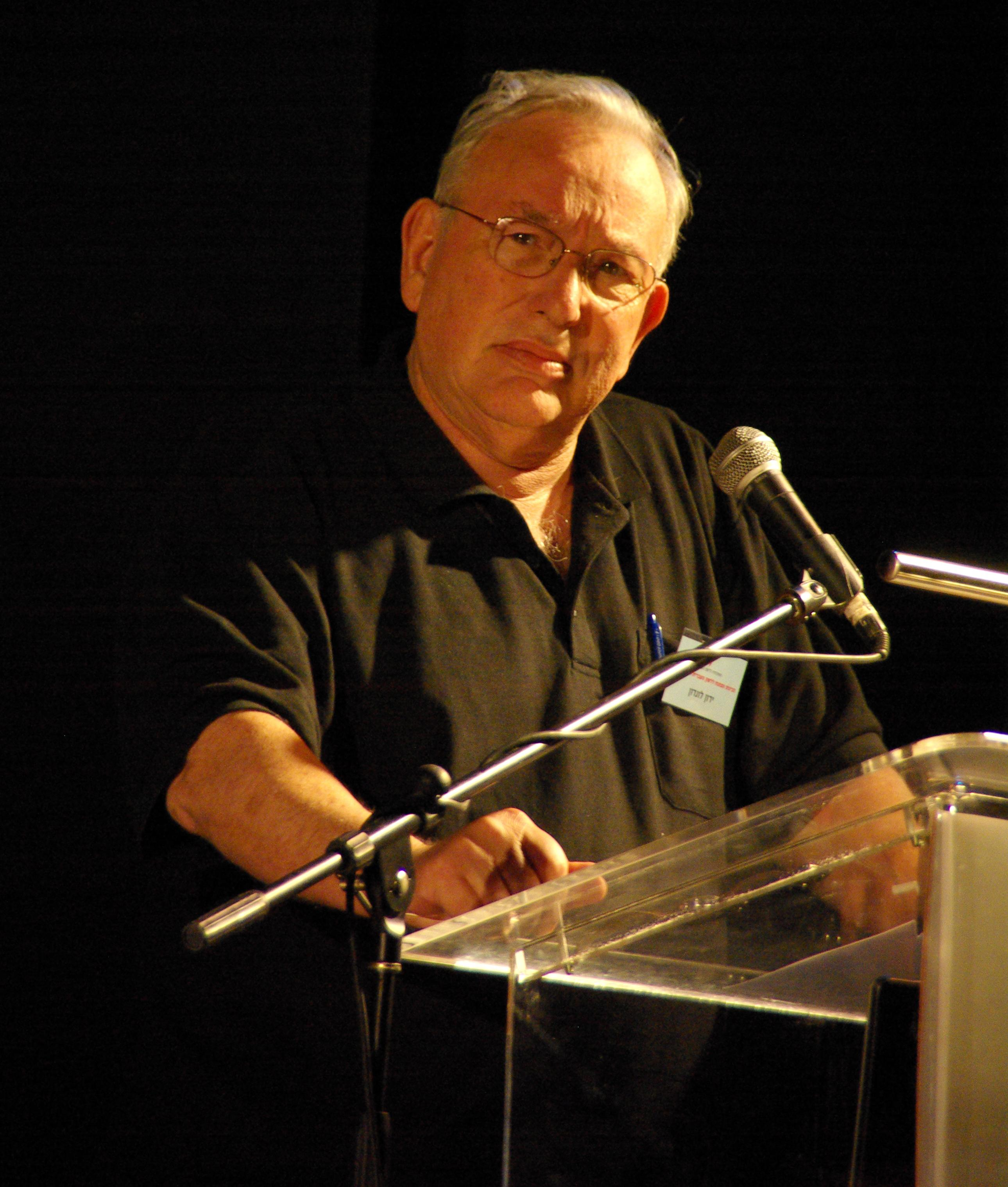
Yaron London, the inspiration for the character Yaron Zahavi

The main character, the handsome leader Yaron Zahavi, was inspired by Yaron London, now a well known Israeli journalist, and the son of a famous Israeli actor, and the other characters, like "Tamar", "Fat Ehud", "Skinny Uzi", or "Menashe the Yemeni" and others, were created based on the children of Kibbutz Na'an (and to whom the books were dedicated: "To the children of Na'an, the yellow (blond), the black, and the red-headed"), where the author, Yigal Mossinson, lived from 1938 to 1950.

Also the enemies are people with names and characters, like the antisemitic British police detective sergeant Jack Smith aka the "Red beetle", the dangerous thief Elimelech Zurkin, and the ruthless mercenary-saboteur Nazi Von-Bilov.

== History and spin-offs ==
The series, by Yigal Mossinson, was first published in 1950 and was extremely popular (over a million copies sold in Israel; "national acclaim"), and a model for many children at that time for courage and conduct. The first book, about the group establishment and their initial adventures during the British mandate in Israel was Hasamba – Havurat sod muchlat be hechlet (Hasamba – The Absolutely Absolute Secret Group). Tens of books followed, adventures in the young State of Israel (established in 1948) and in later times, a total of 44 Hasamba books written until the author died in 1994. Mossinson started to write Hasamba after his elder son, Ido, asked him to write for him new Tarzan books. Mossinson preferred to write original books.

Some of the books were made into films:

- In 1971 the book (number 5) Hasamba Ve-Na'arei hahefker (Hasamba and the deserted youths).
- In 1985 the book (number 3) Hasamba Ve-Shodedey Ha-Susim (Hasamba and the horse robbers).

Plays and musicals:

- In 1998 a theatrical musical composed by Yaron Kafkafi (Hasamba) was produced.
- Hasamba has been also produces as a play by the Orna Porat Theater for Children and Youth and is being played in many places in Israel.

TV series:

- In October 2010 Israeli TV channels Hot 3 and Arutz HaYeladim started airing a 17 episodes series called "Hasamba 3G" which depicts the story of the group when they are elderly, aged 70, and featuring series of many famous players, including Oded Kotler who plays Yaron Zehavi as an adult, while Yaron London (whom as a teenager inspired Yigal Mossinson when he created the character of Yaron Zehavi) – in a cameo role as prime minister of Israel.

Other:

- In 2004 an Israeli stamp for Hasamba was issued in a group of stamps depicting most popular early Israeli youth adventure books.
