= Yehuda Efroni =

Israeli actor (1931–2017)

- יהודה אפרוני
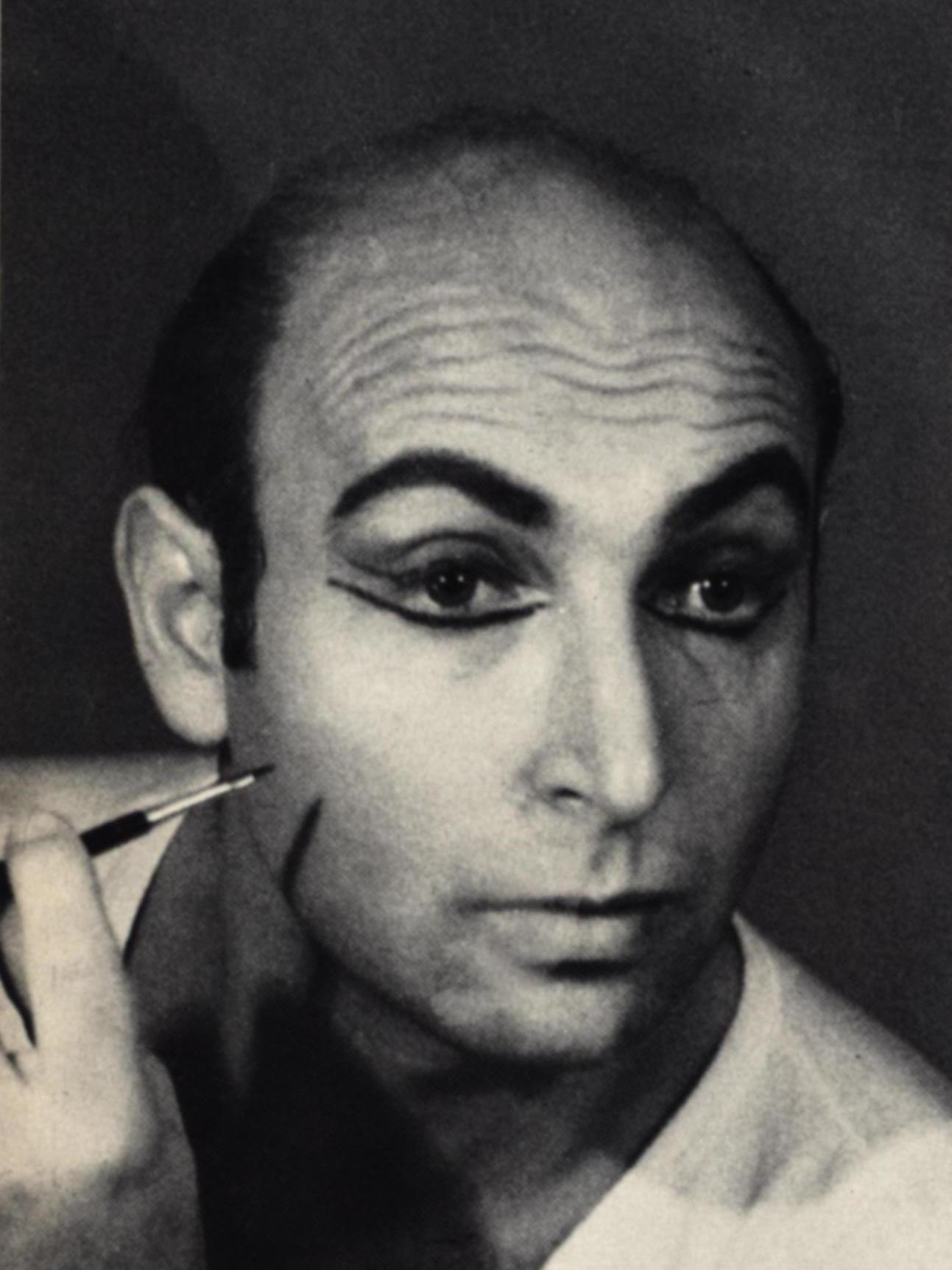
- Born: 18 January 1931; Tel Aviv, Mandatory Palestine
- Died: 11 April 2017 (aged 86); Tel Aviv, Israel
- Occupations: Actor; voice actor
- Years active: 1949–2017
- Children: 2

Yehuda Efroni (Hebrew: יהודה אפרוני; 18 January 1931 – 11 April 2017) was an Israeli actor and voice actor.
