= Adi Talmor =

Israeli journalist (1953–2011)

Adi Talmor עדי טלמור
- Born: Judah Reuben November; April 11, 1953; Ramat Gan, Israel
- Died: August 5, 2011 (aged 58); Zürich, Switzerland
- Occupations: journalist, news presenter, news editor

Adi Talmor (Hebrew: עדי טלמור, born Judah Reuben November; April 11, 1953 – August 5, 2011) was an Israeli journalist and news presenter.

== Biography ==
Talmor was born and raised in Ramat Gan to Jewish immigrant parents who were Holocaust survivors. During Talmor's childhood, his father changed the family's surname to the Hebrew name Talmor.

When Talmor enlisted in the military in the early 1970s, he attempted to join the Army Radio station but he was refused, and instead he served as an Information security officer in the Israeli Air Force. Talmor was initially rejected by the Army Radio unit due to a medical problem which affected his pronunciation. After Talmor underwent rhinoplasty surgery, his pronunciation improved significantly and as a result he was transferred to the Army Radio unit.

At 25 Talmor began working for the Army Radio as a civilian employee. At this point he also changed his first name to "Adi".

Between 1982 and 1992 Talmor worked as a news presenter for the Israeli Channel 1 news show "Erev Hadash" ("ערב חדש"), for which he became widely known in the Israeli public. (At the time, this was the only early-evening TV news show in the country). During that period of time Talmor also worked as a news anchor and news editor at Israeli Army Radio, a job which he held for about 33 years. In addition, all those years Talmor gave courses in announcing at the Geva Studios. As part of his work in the Israeli Army Radio Talmor hosted the radio shows "Bamatzav Hanochachi" ("במצב הנוכחי") and "Betzohorei Hayom" ("בצהרי היום").

== Death ==
Talmor was a heavy smoker until 15 years before his death. At the age of 58 he was diagnosed with lung cancer, and doctors determined that he only had a few months to live. In response, on August 5, 2011, Talmor ended his life by assisted suicide at the Dignitas clinic in Zürich, Switzerland. As he requested, his body was cremated at noon that day and his ashes scattered in a nearby lake.

Before his death, Talmor sent an email to his brother directing him to his neighbour, where he had left his will and farewell letters to his close friends and family members, in a bag bearing the message "Thank you and goodbye." In a letter he left, he asked that those who wished to honor his memory meet "just before sunset" on Thursday, August 11, 2011 (a week after his death), next to his favorite spot on the Tel Aviv Promenade and hold a brief memorial ceremony, as several of his favorite songs played in the background.
