= The Flying Matchmaker =

- שני קוני למל
- Directed by: Israel Becker
- Written by: Israel Becker; Avraham Goldfaden (operetta)
- Produced by: Mordecai Navon
- Starring: Mike Burstyn; Raphael Klatchkin; Jermain Unikovsky; Shmuel Rodensky; Elisheva Michaeli; Rina Ganor; Aharon Meskin
- Cinematography: Romulo Grounni
- Production company: Geva Films
- Release date: 1966
- Running time: 120 minutes
- Country: Israel
- Languages: Yiddish; Hebrew

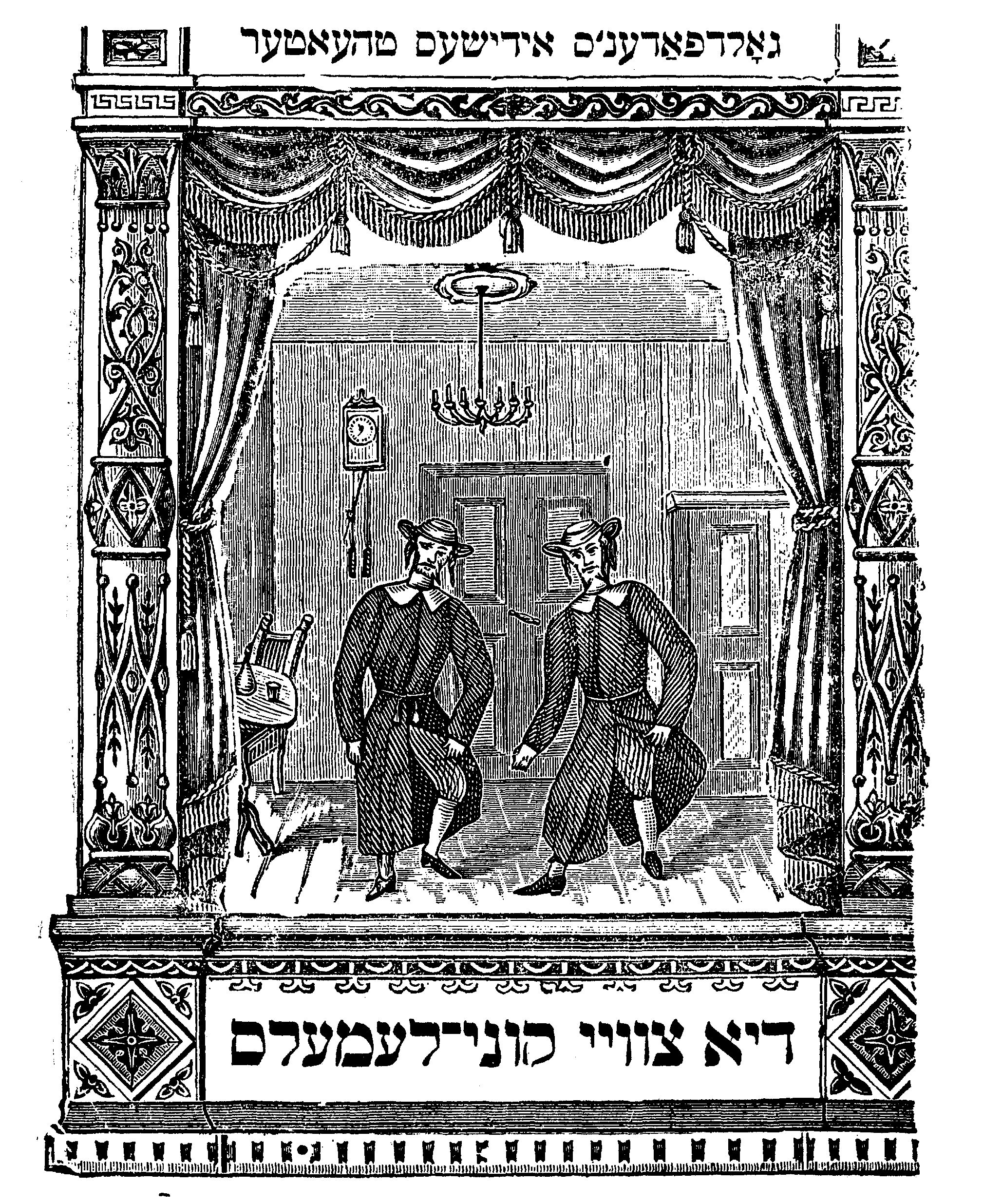
The title page of Goldfaden's play

The Flying Matchmaker (also: Two Kuni Lemel, Shnei Kuni Leml or שני קוני למל) is a 1966 Israeli film musical directed by Israel Becker. The film was the first major success on screen for lead actor Mike Burstyn who has a double role as Kuni Leml and his cousin Max, and also casts his father Pesach Burstein in a small role. The film was selected as the Israeli entry for the Best Foreign Language Film at the 39th Academy Awards, but was not accepted as a nominee.

== Plot history ==
The plot is based on the 1880 Yiddish play, a comedy of errors, Di tsvey Kuni-Lemels (Yiddish: די בײדע קוני-לעמעל) by Abraham Goldfaden. It was based on the German-language comedy Nathan Schlemiel oder Orthodoxe und reformirte Juden by J. Rosenzweig (Note: Rosenzweig's text says that the action is "somewhere in Hungary" and a 1906 Hungarian reference book gives author's name as Ignácz Rosenzweig, born in Pozsony (Both Pressburg and Poszony are the names of Bratislava,)) (Ein Tendenz-Lustspiel in 3 Acten. Pressburg, 1873). Rosenzweig's was also the base for the 1879 play Di tsvey shmuel shmelkes (Two Shmuel Shmelkes) by Joseph Lateiner, and some sources say that Goldfaden's was based on Lateiner's, because the play of the latter one was earlier, but Lateiner's text is no longer available.

== Plot ==
The local matchmaker (shadchan), Reb Kalman, arranges a match for Carolina, the daughter of a wealthy client, Reb Pinchas. The daughter is already romantically linked with Max, who teaches her French. He arranges to show up in Kuni Lemel's place, disguised as Kuni Lemel, so he can marry Carolina. Confusion ensues as both Max and Kuni Lemel show up to court Carolina.

== Cast ==
- Mike Burstyn as Max / Kuni Leml
- Raphael Klatchkin as Matchmaker
- Germaine Unikovsky as Matchmaker's Daughter (as Jermain Unikovsky)
- Shmuel Rodensky as Rebbe Pinchas
- Elisheva Michaeli as Rebbe Pinchas' Wife
- Rina Ganor as Carolina, Rebbe Pinchas's Daughter
- Aharon Meskin as Kuni Leml's Father
- Ari Kutai as Max's Father

== Sequels ==
- Kuni Lemel in Tel Aviv (Kuni Lemel in Tel Aviv at IMDb), 1976
- Kuni Lemel in Cairo (Kuni Lemel in Cairo at IMDb), 1983

== See also ==
- List of submissions to the 39th Academy Awards for Best Foreign Language Film
- List of Israeli submissions for the Academy Award for Best Foreign Language Film
