= Lupo! =

- DVD cover
- Directed by: Menahem Golan
- Written by: Ken Globus; Menahem Golan
- Produced by: Yoram Globus; Menahem Golan
- Starring: Yehuda Barkan; Avirama Golan
- Cinematography: Yehiel Ne'eman; Yehuda Ne'eman
- Edited by: David Treuherz
- Music by: Nurit Hirsh
- Distributed by: The Cannon Group
- Release date: 13 January 1971 (US)
- Running time: 110 minutes
- Country: Israel
- Language: Hebrew

Lupo! is a 1970 Israeli drama film directed by Menahem Golan. The script was written by Golan and Ken Globus.

== Synopsis ==
His home slated to be torn down, his business in serious financial trouble and his only daughter poised to leave the nest with her wealthy fiancé, small-time Tel Aviv second-hand store owner Lupo (Yehuda Barkan) still finds the strength to keep his life, and his pride, intact. But as he fights overeager housing authorities and charms his daughter's future in-laws, he finds himself the romantic target of a loud local widow.

== Principal cast ==
Actor	Role
Yehuda Barkan	Lupo
Avirama Golan	Rachel
Moti Giladi	Amos
Gabi Amrani	Neighbor
Arie Lavie	Regimental sergeant-major
