= Yosef Shiloach =

Israeli actor (1941–2011)

- יוסף שילוח
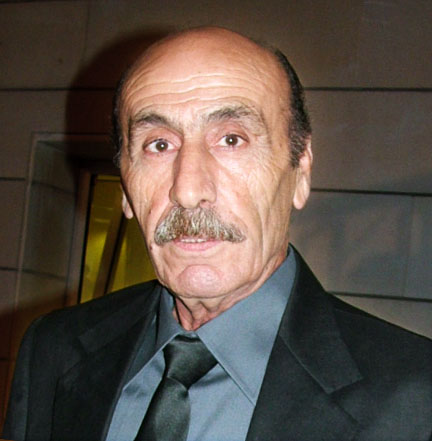
- Shiloach behind the scenes of Days of Love (2005)
- Born: Pirous Yosefian; 9 July 1941; Iranian Kurdistan, Iran
- Died: 3 January 2011 (aged 69); Tel Aviv, Israel
- Occupations: Actor, voice actor
- Years active: 1964–2005
- Known for: Bourekas films; Hebrew voice of Arik (Ernie) on Rechov Sumsum
- Children: 2

Yosef Shiloach (Hebrew: יוסף שילוח; 9 July 1941 – 3 January 2011) was an Israeli actor.

== Biography ==
Yosef Shiloach was born in Kurdistan to a Mizrahi Jewish family. He immigrated to Israel at the age of nine. Shiloach was one of the first graduates of the Beit Zvi acting school.

In 1964, Shiloach appeared in his first film, Mishpachat Simchon. He went on to appear in many Israeli films, especially the Bourekas film genre which portrays the life of Sephardi Jews in an exaggerated comic manner. He often played parts of people of Persian descent. He also appeared in international films, such as I Love You Rosa, The House on Chelouche Street and Rambo III.

As an occasional voice actor, Shiloach provided the Hebrew voice of Arik (Ernie) on Rechov Sumsum, which is the Israeli TV version of Sesame Street.

== Death ==
Shiloach died in Tel Aviv on 3 January 2011, aged 69, after a lengthy battle with cancer. He was survived by his wife and two daughters.

== Selected filmography ==
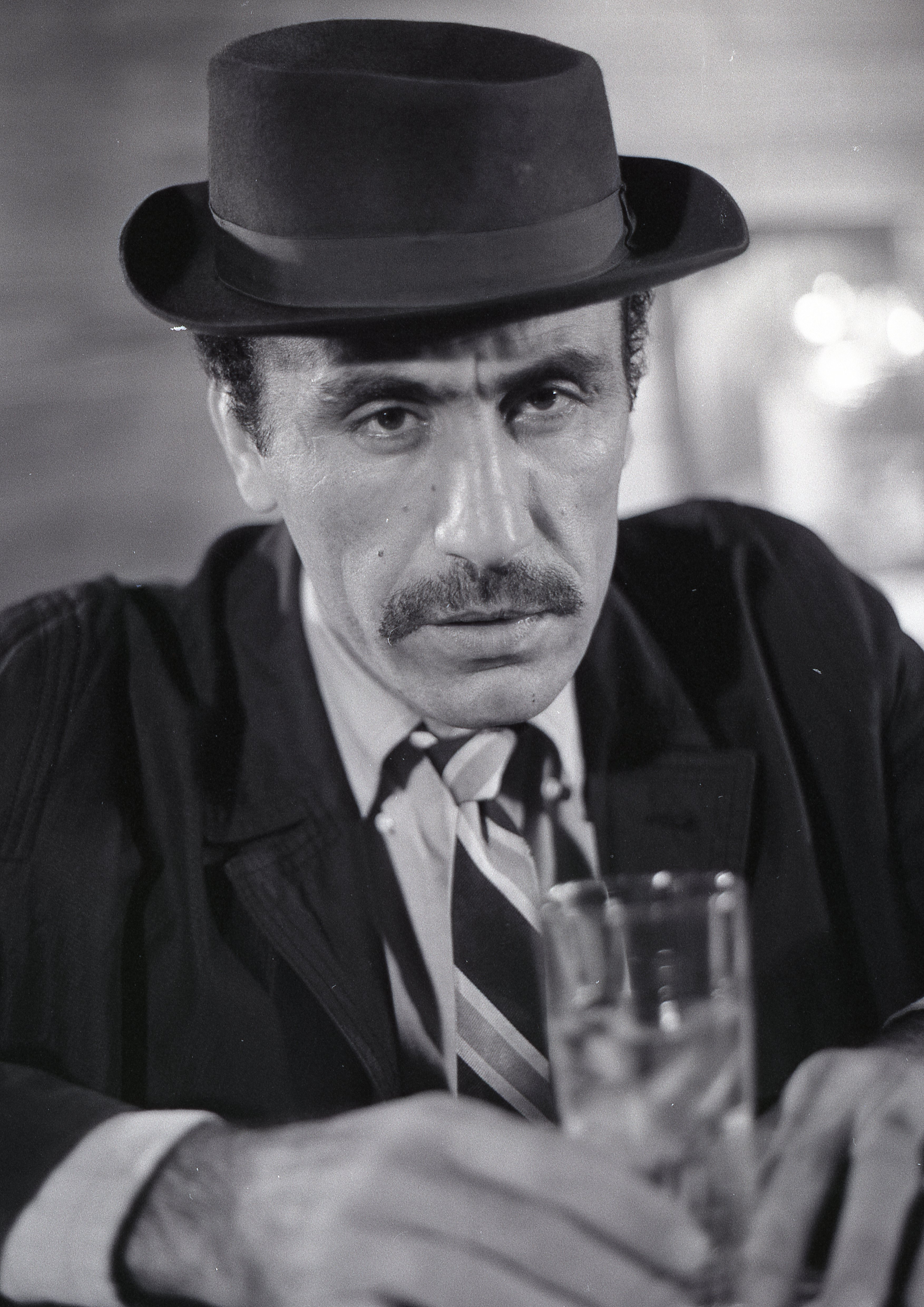
Yosef Shiloach in Big Gus, What's the Fuss? (1973)

- Mishpachat Simchon (1964)
- Pitzutz BeHatzot (1965)
- Sinai Commandos (1968)
- Margo Sheli (1969) - Hotel Manager
- Ha-Pritza Hagdola (1970) - Heikal
- La salamandra del deserto (1970)
- Katz V'Carasso (1971) - Kadosh Carasso
- The Policeman (1971) - Amar
- I Love You Rosa (1972) - Eli
- Ha-Balash Ha'Amitz Shvartz (1973) - Simcha
- Abu el Banat (1973) - Joseph Omri
- The House on Chelouche Street (1973) - Nissim
- The Story of Jacob and Joseph (1974)
- Hagiga Le'enayim (1975)
- Hagiga B'Snuker (1975) - Salvador
- Rosebud (1975) - Hacam
- Diamonds (1975) - Mustafa
- Mishpahat Tzan'ani (1976) - Ben Naim
- The Passover Plot (1976) - Zealot (uncredited)
- Street 60 (1976) - Himself
- Hamesh Ma'ot Elef Shahor (1977)
- Vengeance (1977) - Lupe
- Hatzilu Et HaMatzil (1977)
- Nisuin Nusah Tel Aviv (1979) - Avram
- Natziv Hamelech (1979)
- Jesus (1979) - Joseph
- Melech LeYom Ehad (1980)
- Kohav Hashahar (1980) - Uncle Sammy
- Sofo Shel Milton Levy (1981)
- Sapiches (1982) - Sgt.Shemesh / Ramirez
- Paradise (1982) - Ahmed
- Sababa (1983) - 1st Sgt. Shemesh
- Sahara (1983) - Halef
- Green (1984)
- The Ambassador (1984) - Shimon
- Ha-Doda Mi'Argentina (1984)
- Up Your Anchor (1985) - Georgiyan
- Ha-Shiga'on Hagadol (1986) - Jacuzzi
- Ha-Tov, HaRa, VeHaLo-Nora (1986)
- Alex Holeh Ahavah (1986) - Faruk
- Iron Eagle (1986) - Tower Official
- The Lion of Africa (1987)
- Rambo III (1988) - Khalid
- Tzamot (1989)
- Not Without My Daughter (1991) - Mohsen's Companion
- American Cyborg: Steel Warrior (1993) - Akmir
- Night Terrors (1993) - Pardy Hardy
- The Mummy Lives (1993) - Capt. Mahmoud
- Chain of Command (1994) - Azil
- Leylasede (1995) - Michael
- Nashim (1996)
- Ben (1997)
- Desperado Square (2001) - Yisrael 'the Indian'
- Yamim Shel Ahava (2005) - Yossef Dahan (final film role)

== See also ==
- Israeli cinema
