= Yehuda Barkan =

Israeli actor (1945–2020)

- יהודה בארקן
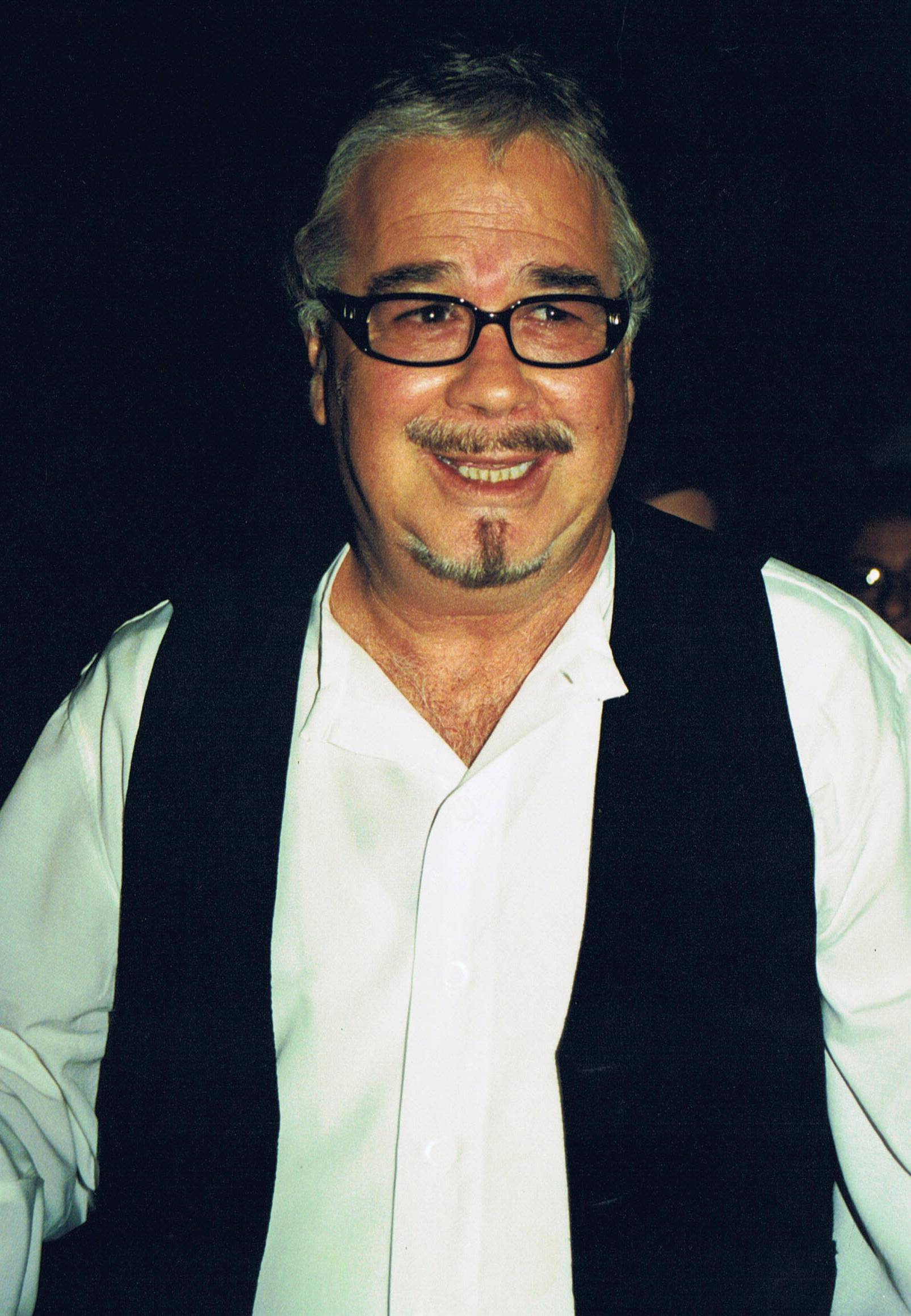
- Born: Yehuda Ezekiel Berkowitz; March 29, 1945; Netanya, Israel
- Died: October 23, 2020 (aged 75); Jerusalem, Israel
- Years active: 1965–2020

Yehuda Barkan (Hebrew: יהודה בארקן; 29 March 1945 – 23 October 2020) was an Israeli actor, film producer, film director, and screenwriter. He was noted for his appearance in Israeli comedy cult classics of the 1970s, and for producing and directing candid camera "prank films" in the 1980s.

== Biography ==
Yehuda Ezekiel Berkowitz (later Barkan) was born in Netanya. His father was born in Poland while his mother was born in Czechoslovakia; both immigrated to Israel before the Second World War. His parents spoke Yiddish. He studied at the Bialik and ORT schools in Netanya. During his military service in the IDF, Barkan served in a Combat Engineering Corps unit and in the Northern Command Band. From his first marriage, Barkan had four children.

At the beginning of the 2000s, Barkan became a baal teshuva and moved to the religious moshav Beit Gamliel with his family.

In November 2008, Barkan was questioned by the Israeli Tax Authority on suspicion of tax evasion.

Barkan died on October 23, 2020, after contracting COVID-19 during the COVID-19 pandemic in Israel.

== Music career ==
After his military service, Barkan joined the Dizengoff Command Band (להקת פיקוד דיזנגוף), a band composed of veteran members of military bands who performed songs and skits.

== Media and film career ==
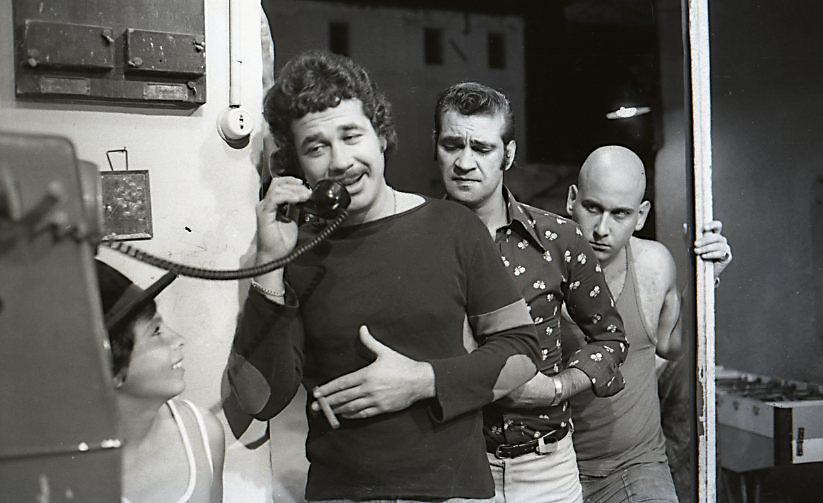
Barkan in "Charlie and a Half"

In the early 1970s, Barkan participated in a sketch on the Israeli radio show Hamim VeTaim (חמים וטעים) in which Barkan and his colleagues, Moshe Timor, Shlomo Bar-Aba and others, made live prank calls. This became the inspiration for his later practical joke films.

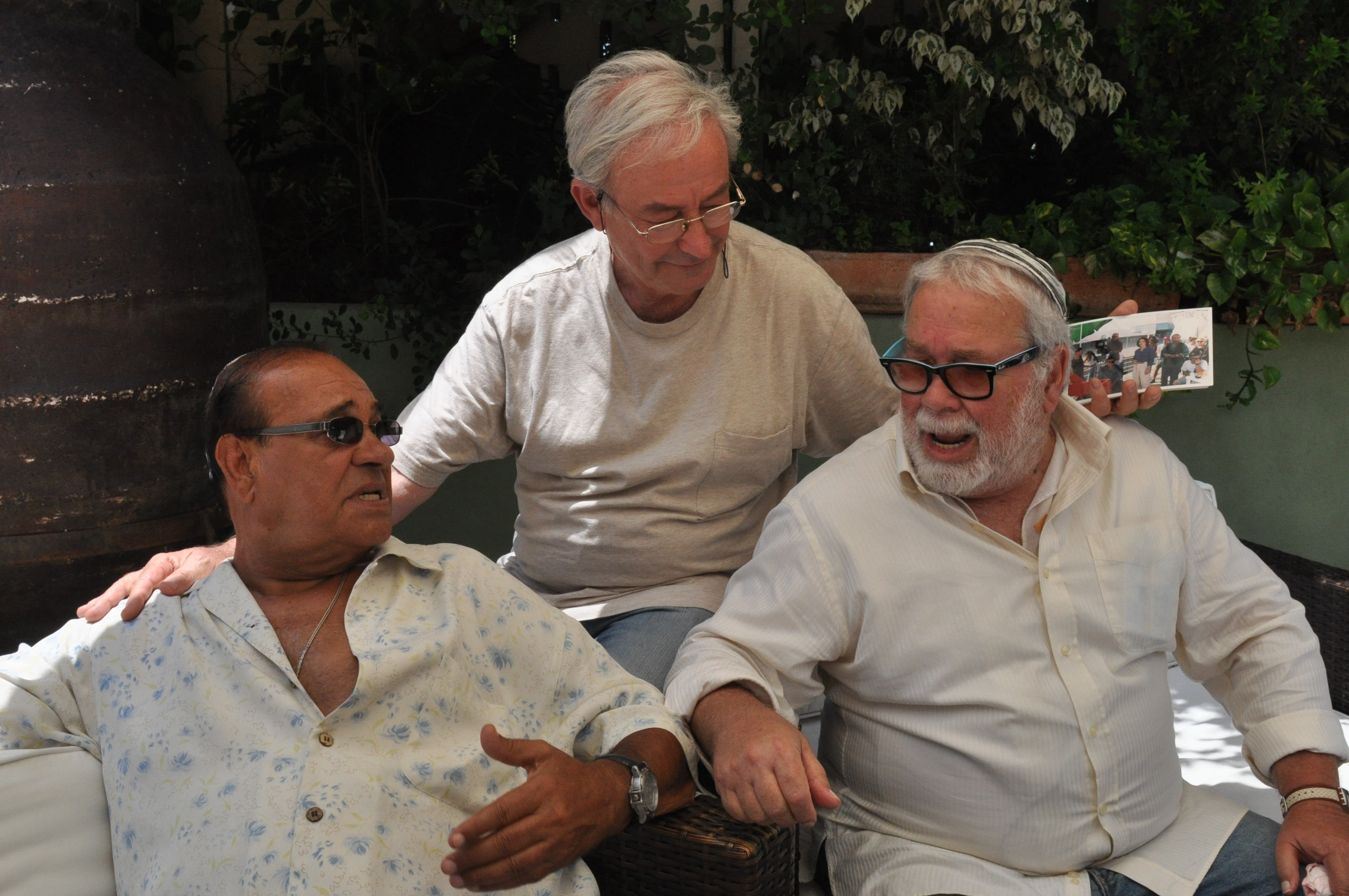

During the 1970s and 1980s, Barkan participated in many Israeli "Bourekas films", among them Lupo!, Lupo in New York, Katz V'Carasso, Charlie Ve'hetzi, Hagiga B'Snuker, Bo Nefotzetz Million and more. Other films he appeared in during that time include Malkat Hakvish (1971) appearing alongside Gila Almagor, Menachem Golan's film Eagles Attack at Dawn (1970), and the film adaptation of the novel He Walked Through the Fields (1967) alongside Assi Dayan.

During the 1980s, Barkan began to direct and produce films, including the hidden camera film Hayeh Ahaltah Otah (which he directed together with Yigal Shilon), Nipagesh Bachof, Nipagesh Basivuv, Matzlema Bli Busha and Geveret Tiftehi, Ze Ani). Also during the 1980s, Barkan produced and directed comic drama films, most notably the Abba Ganuv film series and the film Neshika Bametzach released in 1990 alongside Michal Yanai.

In 1994, shortly after the start of Israeli commercial television Channel 2 began its broadcasting, Barkan started hosting his own practical jokes show called Lo Dofkim Cheshbon. The show was cancelled shortly after.

In 1999, Barkan participated in two last films: Look into my eyes and Volcano Junction, in which he played small supporting roles.

In 2003, Barkan took part in the documentary film Zehirut Matzlema along with Nurit Geffen and Josie Katz.

In 2004, Barkan appeared in the drama series Ahava BaShalechet along with Lea Koenig.

Barkan enjoyed a career resurgence in the 2010s. He played the part of a grandfather of a young child with autism in the Israeli television series Yellow Peppers, and beginning in 2017 played a rabbi in the television series Kipat Barzel.

== Selected filmography ==
=== Films ===
- 1967: He Walked Through the Fields
- 1970: Lupo! – Lupo
- 1971: Katz and Karasso
- 1971: The Highway Queen (Malkat Hakvish) – Arik
- 1972: Escape to the Sun – Yasha Bazarov
- 1974: Charlie Ve'hetzi (Charlie and a Half) – Charlie
- 1975: Hagiga B'Snuker
- 1985: Smell and Smile (Kompot Na'alyim)
- 1987: Cool Dad (Abba Ganuv)
- 1987: Nipagesh Basivuv
- 1989: Cool Dad 2 (Abba Ganuv 2)
- 1990: Neshika Bametzach (The Day We Met) – Arik Schwartzman
- 1991: Cool Dad 3 (Abba Ganuv 3)
- 1992: Ma'am, Open, It's Me
- 1993: Looking for a husband on four legs
- 1999: Look me in the eyes
- 1999: Vulcan Junction
- 2000: Mosh
- 2003: Every Jew is Gold
- 2013: Matat
- 2015: Tobiansky
- 2015: Tales of Tales of Rabbi Nachman
- 2019: Love in Shlikes - Beno

=== Television ===
- 2011: Yellow Peppers
- 2017: Kipat Barzel
