= George Ovadiah =

Iraqi-born Israeli filmmaker

- چورچ اوڤادي
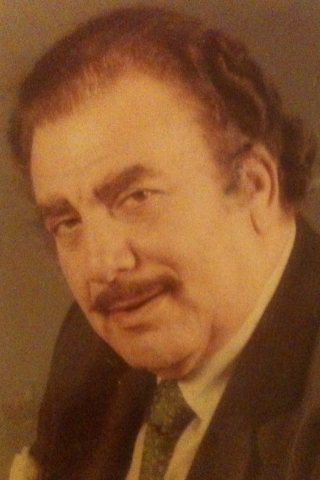
- Born: c. 1925; Baghdad, Iraq
- Died: 27 June 1996 (aged 70–71); Holon, Israel
- Burial place: Yarkon Cemetery
- Other names: George Obadiah, Gorji Obadiah, George Ovadya
- Occupation(s): Film director, scriptwriter, film producer

Ovadiah and Uri Zohar on the set of the movie "Call me Shmil", 1973

George Ovadiah (Arabic: چورچ اوڤادي; Hebrew: ג'ורג' עובדיה; Persian: گرجی عبادیا; c. 1925 – 1996), also known as George Obadiah, was an Iraqi-born Israeli film director, scriptwriter and producer.

== Biography ==
George Ovadiah was born in c. 1925 in Baghdad, Iraq. He immigrated to Iran in 1949, where he became an established filmmaker. In Iran he directed 25 films and occasionally was an actor. In 1967 he made "Harbor of Love", an Israeli-Iranian coproduction.

In 1969 he immigrated to Israel. Ovadiah directed 13 Israeli films, focused in melodrama and comedy known as Bourekas film. Initially his films were box office successes, but his later films were failures. In 1996 the Israeli Film Academy paid tribute to his memory.

He died on 27 June 1996 in Holon, Israel.

== Filmography ==
- 1959 – A Girl from Esfahan (Persian: دختری از اصفهان, romanized: Dokhtari az Esfahan)

== See also ==
- Cinema of Israel
- Bourekas film
