= Kuni Lemel in Tel Aviv =

- קוני למל בתל אביב
- Directed by: Yoel Zilberg
- Starring: Mike Burstyn
- Music by: Dov Seltzer
- Release date: 1976
- Country: Israel

Kuni Lemel in Tel Aviv (Hebrew: קוני למל בתל אביב) is a 1976 Israeli comedy musical film written and directed by Yoel Zilberg, with music composed by Dov Seltzer. It stars Mike Burstyn in a triple role and is the second film in the Kuni Lemel trilogy, serving as a contemporary sequel to Two Kuni Lemel.

== Plot ==
On the occasion of his ninetieth birthday, the elderly Kuni Lemel (Mike Burstyn), a Brooklyn patriarch, announces that whichever of his twin grandsons is first to immigrate to Israel and marry a Jewish woman will inherit five million dollars. The two grandsons, both also played by Burstyn, are Kuni, a devout, sheltered yeshiva student, and Moni, a secular free spirit living with a non-Jewish entertainer, Marilyn Jones (Mandy Rice-Davies). Both brothers set off for Israel to compete for the inheritance. Moni assumes Kuni's identity in order to gain the upper hand, while Kuni unexpectedly falls in love with Marilyn, Moni's own girlfriend. At first Marilyn collaborates with Moni's scheme, hoping to claim a share of the fortune at Kuni's expense, but her feelings for Kuni gradually grow genuine. In the end, it turns out there is no inheritance, but both couples have found love.
