= Kazablan (1973 film) =

- Theatrical release poster
- Directed by: Menahem Golan
- Screenplay by: Menahem Golan; Haim Hefer
- Based on: Kazablan by Yigal Mosenzon; Joel Silberg
- Produced by: Menahem Golan
- Starring: Yehoram Gaon; Efrat Lavie; Arieh Elias; Etti Grotes; Yehuda Efroni
- Cinematography: David Gurfinkel
- Edited by: Dov Hoenig
- Music by: Dov Seltzer
- Production companies: Noah Films; Metro-Goldwyn-Mayer
- Distributed by: United Artists (United States/Canada)
- Release date: July 7, 1973 (Israel)
- Running time: 122 minutes
- Country: Israel
- Language: Hebrew
- Budget: IL2,800,000

Kazablan is a 1973 Israeli film in the genre of musical and Bourekas films, directed by Menachem Golan and starring Yehoram Gaon, Efrat Lavie, Arieh Elias, Etti Grotes and Yehuda Efroni. The script was written by Menachem Golan and Haim Hefer, and is based on the musical of the same name from 1966. The film was released in Israel on July 7, 1973, and as of today is the second most watched film in the history of Israeli motion pictures, with 1,222,500 tickets sold (the country's population at the time was about 2.8 million inhabitants). It was also released in the United States on May 8, 1974, by Metro-Goldwyn-Mayer.

== Plot ==
In a dilapidated housing complex in Jaffa, new and old immigrants live together - some from Europe and some from Middle Eastern countries. There is also in the neighbourhood an elderly fisherman named Moshiko Bebeuf who directs the film's plot. Yosef Siman-Tov, known by everyone as "Kazablan" (or for short: Kaza) also lived in the housing. Kazablan immigrated to Israel from Morocco as a child and formed a group of thugs around him ("the Jama'ah"), who harass the residents of Jaffa in general and the residents of the housing complex in particular, for example by creating noise and commotion in the street early in the morning when everyone is still sleeping.

Kazablan insists that Rachel, the daughter of the Polish Mr. Feldman, one of the heads of the complex housing, say good morning to him, but Mr. Feldman objects, orders Rachel to enter the house, and tells Kazablan that he has no idea what honour is. The neighbours return to their homes and Kazablan and the Jama'a burst into the well-known song "Kol HaKavod."

The residents of the neighbourhood go about their daily toil, most of them at market stalls, talking and even confronting each other (via the song "We are all Jews").

Rachel arrives at the shop of Janus, an immigrant from Hungary, a cobbler and a resident of the housing estate, in order to bring her shoes for repair. Kazablan and his gang call Janus "Goulash" due to his origin. Janus, who is in love with Rachel, despite being many years older than her, gives her new shoes with which she goes outside and runs into Kazablan, who still insists that she say good morning, blocking her way. Her father (Mr. Feldman) comes running to her defence, but Rachel is amused by the whole situation and greets Kazablan with a good morning blessing and he clears the way for her. Mr. Feldman and the neighbors look at him with looks of hatred and contempt and he walks away alone and misses a sense of home and belonging (the song "There is a place").

Meantime, the Tel Aviv-Jaffa municipality decides to demolish the immigrant housing in Jaffa on the grounds that the houses are dilapidated and may be destroyed in the coming rain. The residents of the housing estate decide not to give up and hold a meeting in which they decide to collect money to strengthen the housing estate in order to make it livable (the song "Democracy"). Kazablan and the Jama'ah pass by the assembly, and seeing the money collected, warn Mr. Feldman to be careful that the money "won't get any legs" and disappear.

Later that evening, Rachel walks through the streets of Jaffa on her way home after school, and meets Janus, who was waiting for her. He asks her to go out with him, but she refuses his offer, and Janus grabs her. Kazablan, who happens to be passing by, intervenes, makes Janus leave, and accompanies her home. They are followed by the Jama'ah, whom Kazablan chases away so they don't disturb them (with the bored Jama'ah singing "Ma Kara"). After the walk Kazablan goes to meet the Jama'ah, but on the way, he is attacked from behind and beaten by two of Janus's employees, who sent them to avenge his humiliation. The battered and bruised Kazablan consoles himself at Madame Rosa's night club, where his friends are (the song "Jaffa").

Mr. Feldman realizes that Kazablan accompanied her home and came to talk to him outside the club. He asks Kazablan to let her go and find someone "more suitable" for him, alluding to Kazablan's Moroccan origins. Kazablan says he will consider it and returns to the club, where the owner tries to comfort him (the song "Rosa").

The next day Rachel hears of Kazablan's beating, and worried, goes to his home. She sees he is ok, and invites him to lunch on Saturday at her house. The enamoured Kazablan hesitates but accepts the invitation and goes to meet Jama'ah, who help him get ready.

Kazablan arrives at the Feldman family home for the Saturday lunch he was invited to. Mr. Feldman refuses to join the table and calls Kazablan a gangster from the other room. Rachel and her stepmother try to convince Mr. Feldman to join the table, leaving Kazablan alone in the room, and he notices the hidden box where the money collected from the neighbourhood residents was placed. He pushes the box so that it is better hidden. The meal goes well, even though this is the Moroccan Kazablan's first encounter with the dish gefilte fish (which he secretly passes to the cat). During the meal, it is revealed that Kazablan is a war hero who received a medal for rescuing his wounded commander from the battlefield, which causes Mr. Feldman to see him differently. At the end of the meal, Kazablan and Rachel drive to Jerusalem together in a car that was "arraigned" by the Jama'ah. While the two are travelling in Jerusalem, Janus arrives at Feldman's house, to try and convince him to tell Rachel to marry him and beg him to leave the neighbourhood together for a better place. Mr. Feldman refuses both requests. The disappointed Janus also notices the box where the money is and steals it.

When Kazablan and Rachel return from Jerusalem, the police are waiting to arrest him for stealing the money, after it was discovered that the box in which it was kept was empty. Mr. Feldman and all the residents of the neighbourhood are all convinced that Kazablan is the thief, and only Rachel believes that he is innocent. When she insists on this to her father he slaps her, prompting her to run away from him to the beach (the song "I'm so scared").

Kazablan is in custody and awaiting questioning. The investigating officer who arrives turns out to be Josh, Kazablan's commander in the army, whose life he saved in battle. The meeting between the two is charged and Kazablan tells him in frustration and resentment about his loneliness and his disappointment that his former friends from the army, with whom he fought shoulder to shoulder in the war and one of whose life he saved in the middle of the inferno by carrying him on his back, have not remained in contact with him at all. Josh tells him that he should ignore that and that he shouldn't care about invitations he does or doesn't receive from those who were his squadmates.

In the meantime, the Jama'ah take care of the renovation of the neighbourhood, and bring trucks, materials, an architect and an engineer. All the residents of the neighbourhood mobilize and carry out the renovation. When the municipal inspectors come to begin the demolition of the neighbourhood, the engineer gives them his opinion that the buildings of the neighbourhood are now stable and there is no need to demolish them.

Meanwhile, Josh continues his investigation, but Kazablan refuses to say he didn't take the money. Despite this, and despite the fact that his fingerprints were found on the box (because he pushed it further into the hiding place), Josh decides to release Kazablan.

Kazablan returns to Jaffa and on the way realizes that he must free himself from the feeling of bitterness and inferiority (the song "Get off of me Kazablan"). He goes straight to Janus's shop, where he finds him together with Rachel who has come to tell Janus that she knows he is the thief. Kazablan takes Rachel out, and also beats Janus's two assistants who had attacked him. The helpers run away, but the Jama'ah are waiting for them to avenge the attack. Kazablan is left alone with Janus in the store, hits him and demands to know where the money is. After a few minutes, Kazablan throws Janos out with a shoe box in Janos's hands containing the stolen money, and his guilt is proven in front of all the residents of the neighbourhood. The police arrive and arrest Janus, and Josh invites Kazablan to his house on the weekend.

Rachel's father and all the residents of the neighbourhood realize that they were quick to judge Kazablan and that they actually owe him a debt of gratitude. The film ends with the circumcision ceremony of the son of a young couple from the neighbourhood, in which the baby is named after Kazablan, and he is honoured as the godfather and hero of the neighbourhood (string of circumcision hymns).

== Cast ==
- Yehoram Gaon as Kazablan
- Efrat Lavie as Rachel
- Arieh Elias as Moshiko
- Etti Grotes as Maryuma
- Yehuda Efroni as Mr. Feldman
- Gita Luka as Mrs. Feldman
- Aliza Azikri as Singer
- Yossi Graber as Janus
- Misha Asherov as Josh
- Abraham Ronai as Sarevsky
- Ya'ackov Ben-Sira as Mr. Spiegel
- Gabi Ohad as Mrs. Spiegel
- Chaim Banai as Mr. Shimon
- Geula Yeffet as Mrs. Shimon
- Yaacov Timan as Russian Neighbor
- Miriam Oleinik
- Zvi Borodo as Mr. Nissimov
- Madeline Rahmimov as Mrs. Nissimov
- Victor Atar as Sgt. Mizrahi
- Moshe Hillel as Mohel
- Mutzi Aviv as Nikko
- Nurit Amir
- Gabi Shoshan as a member of Kazablan's gang

== Production ==
=== Background ===
The play "Kazablan" was written by Yigal Mosinzon at the request of the Telam organization (Ma'aborot Theater), who wanted a play that would appeal to the new immigrants. In September 1954, it was staged as a play at the Cameri Theater, directed by Shmuel Bonim and starring Yosef Yadin and Haya Harareet. In 1966, the play became a musical, adapted by them by Musinson and Joel Silberg added poems written by Amos Ettinger and Haim Hefer. The story was 'softened" and Kazablan - who in the original version was accused of murder - was only accused of theft. The musical was produced by Giora Godik. Yehoram Gaon, who starred as the main character, broke into the Israeli consciousness thanks to the musical and returned to star in the film adaptation as well.

=== Filming ===
The film was shot on a budget of 2.8 million Israeli pounds, the highest ever for an Israeli production at the time, with around 700,000 pounds going towards employee salaries. It was filmed using a rented Panavision camera from England on 70mm film, and the music was recorded in stereo. The original actors from the stage production, who portrayed characters such as Kazablan, Marioma, and Moshiko, returned to reprise their roles in the film.

While the original play "Kazablan" was set in the "Big Yard" in Jaffa (now known as Gan HaPisga), by the 1970s, little remained of the original setting, prompting the filming to take place in the nearby Manshiya neighborhood, then facing demolition.

An English version of the film was also produced simultaneously, with translators from the United States and England assisting in translating the script and songs, as well as coaching the actors in proper pronunciation.

== Music ==
The songs were written by Dan Almagor and Amos Ettinger and composed by Dov Seltzer. The opening melody is an instrumental verse and includes excerpts from the main songs in the film.

1. Kol HaKavod - performed by Yoram Gaon and the Casabellan group
2. Kulanu Yehudim (We are all Jews) - performed by Aryeh Elias, Etty Grotes and the Casabellan group
3. Yesh Makom (There is a place) - performed by Yoram Gaon
4. Democracy - performed by Etti Grotes, Yankel'a Ben-Sira and the Casabellan group
5. Ma Kara (What happened) - performed by the Casabellan group
6. Jaffa - performed by Aliza Azikri
7. Rosa - performed by Yoram Gaon
8. Ani Kol Kach Pochedet (I'm so scared) - performed by Chava Alberstein
9. Red Mimeni, Kazablan (Get off me, Kazablan) - performed by Yoram Gaon
10. Circumcision hymns - performed by the Casabellan group and more.

== Accolades ==
Golden Globes - Nominee - Best Motion Picture – Non-English Language

Golden Globes - Nominee - Best Original Song - Motion Picture - "Rosa Rosa"
