= Dan Almagor =

Israeli playwright (born 1935)

- דן אלמגור
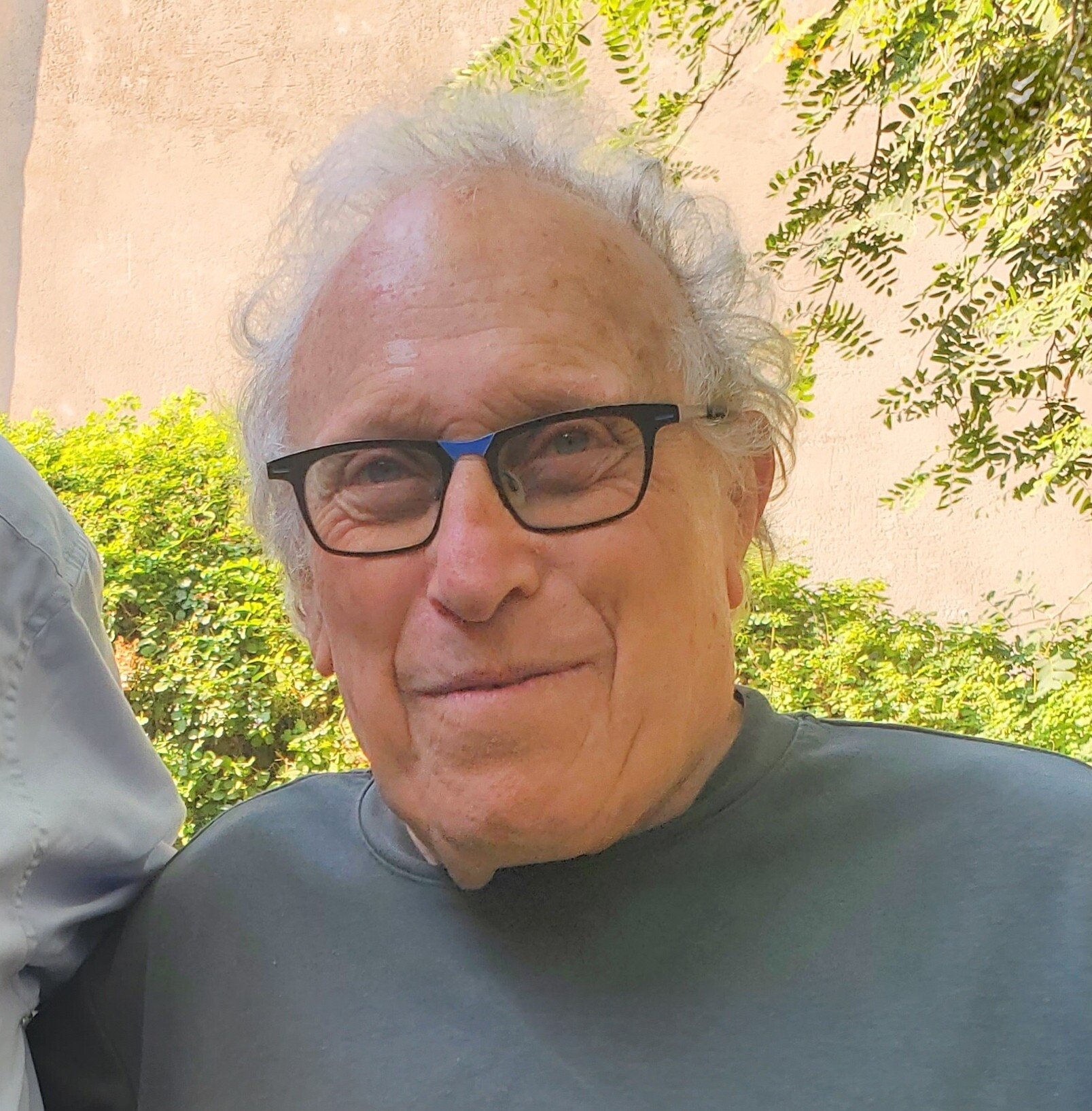
- Almagor in 2014
- Born: דן אֶלְבְּלינגר Dan Elblinger; July 13, 1935 (age 91); Ramat Gan, Mandatory Palestine
- Education: Hebrew University of Jerusalem University of California, Los Angeles
- Occupations: Songwriter, playwright, scholar, poet.
- Writing career
- Language: Hebrew
- Years active: 1945-present
- Notable work: Kazablan

Dan Almagor (Hebrew: דן אלמגור; born 13 July 1935) is an Israeli playwright, songwriter, publicist, journalist, author, translator, literary scholar, radio broadcaster and television host. Has adapted and translated over a hundred plays for the Hebrew stage, including Shakespeare's "The Comedy of Errors", "As You Like It", "Fiddler on the Roof," "The King and I," "My Fair Lady" and "Guys and Dolls". One of the most prominent creators in the field of Hebrew song and Israeli drama, and is known as someone who has been researching the history of Hebrew songs and their writers, Hebrew literature throughout its generations (with a specialization in medieval and Renaissance literature) and the Hebrew language for many years.The National Library in Jerusalem holds all of Almagor’s creative works.

== Early life ==
Almagor was born in Ramat Gan in 1935 as Dan Elblinger. His father, Ze'ev Elblinger, born in Warsaw, was a member of the Ariel group of Hashomer Hatzair, an agronomist, a graduate of the Agricultural Institute in Algiers and a pioneer of the Third Aliyah, and his mother, Zehava Katzenlenbogen, was born in Lublin. In 1940, his sister Bracha was born. He grew up in Rehovot. In his childhood and youth, he wrote for several children's and youth newspapers, such as "Davar Leyeladim", "Haboker Leyeladim" and "Mishmar Leyeladim", was the representative of young listeners on Kol Yerushalayim radio, served as the youth columnist for Kol Yisrael radio station, and was a sports reporter for Rehovot for Kol Yisrael and newspapers of the time such as "Ha'Olam Hazeh". In 1951, while in the tenth grade, he founded, together with his friend Shabtai Zivald, the "National Council of High School Students", which became the National Student Council. During his service in the IDF (1953–1955), he was a military correspondent and editor of the newspaper "Bemachane Gadn'a".

His early songs, such as A Ballad for the Medic and Kol Ha’Kavod, celebrated Israeli macho culture and military heroism, but much of his later work is satiric and critical of Israeli society.

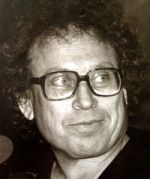
דן אלמגור, בסביבות 2004

== Academic Studies and Research on Literature and Poetry ==
During his service, he completed three years of evening studies in political science at the Tel Aviv School of Law and Economics. In 1956, he studied in the first semester of Tel Aviv University and completed two years of studies in literature and the Bible. Between 1957 and 1960, he completed his bachelor's degree at the Hebrew University of Jerusalem in Hebrew and English literature. Between 1960 and 1963, he completed his studies in the Hebrew Literature Department (with distinction). Among his teachers were Prof. Shimon Halkin, the poet Leah Goldberg, Prof. Dov Noy, and Prof. Haim Shirman, who also supervised Almagor in writing his master's thesis. He received his MA in 1963 for work on the poetry of the Golden Age in Spain and Hebrew poetry in Renaissance Italy, which focused on the poetry of Yosef Tzarfati. From 1963 to 1968, he studied at UCLA for his doctorate as a Fulbright Scholar. His doctoral thesis was written under the supervision of Prof. Avraham Band and dealt with the art of storytelling of the writer Micha Yosef Berdichevsky.

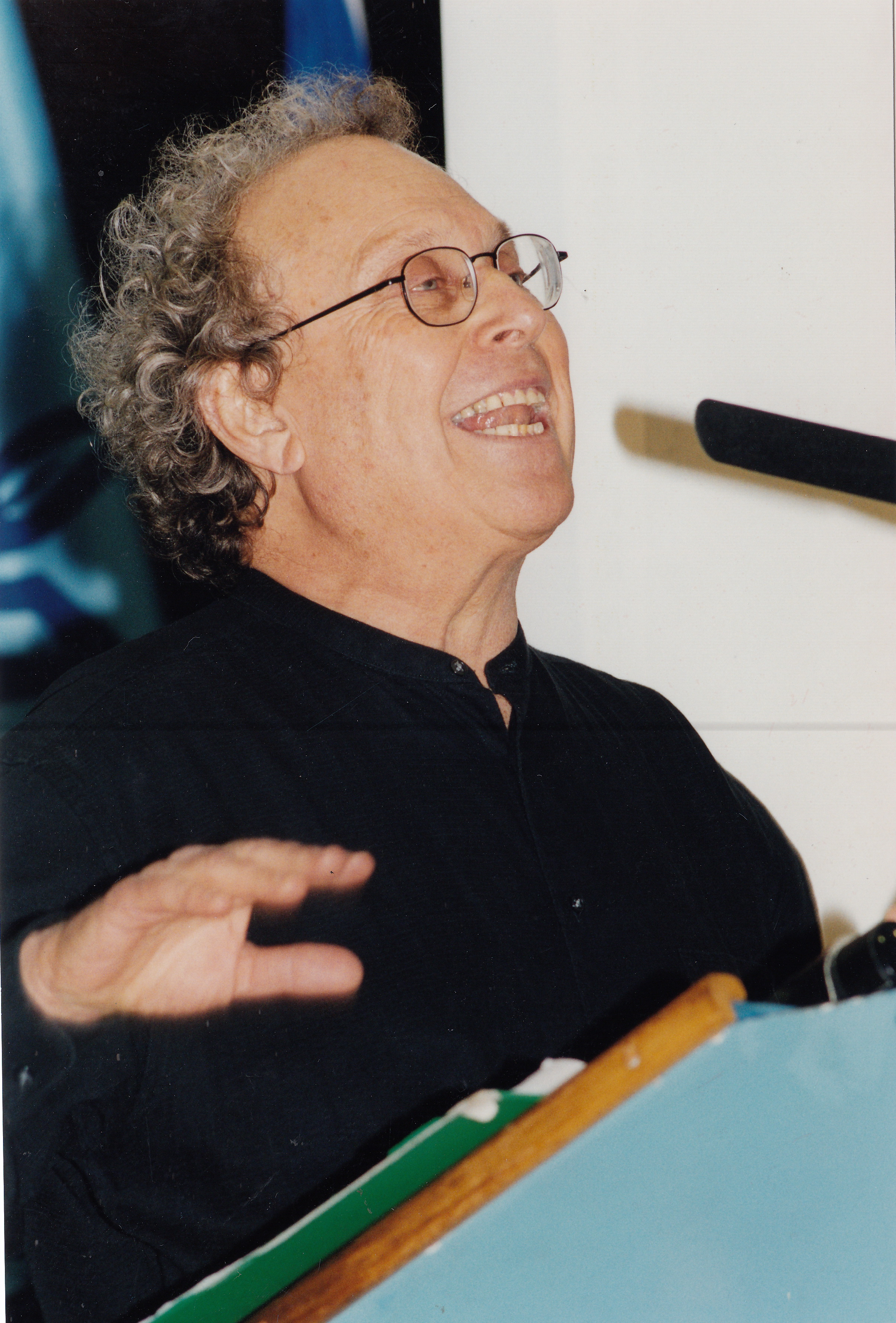
דן אלמגור, תחילת שנות ה-2000

Almagor wrote dozens of academic articles on the history of Hebrew literature in the Middle Ages, the Renaissance, and the modern era, including on Bialik, Agnon, and Berdichevsky, and also edited, together with Shmuel Fishman, the bibliography Nachalat Berdichevsky, which was published, among others, in the journals "Bama", "Mozenayim", "Paper 77", "Aley See’ach", "Leshonenu La'am", "Ma'agalei Kri'a" and "Kesher". He wrote articles on the history of Hebrew drama, among others, on the first Hebrew playwright Yehuda Sommo, as well as on the satirical poems of Alterman and others in the Hebrew press. He wrote several entries for the Hebrew Encyclopaedia on the subjects of theatre and literature, among them on Emmanuel the Roman and Yosef Tzarfati.

Between 1964 and 1974, he published hundreds of articles and essays on subjects of literature and art, the Hebrew language and slang, Hebrew hymns and current affairs in the United States and England.

Between 1964 and 2010 he served as the Israeli correspondent for "The Shakespeare Quarterly" and curated the collection "Shakespeare - From Right to Left", which contains a comprehensive bibliography of Hebrew translations of Shakespeare. Among other things, he wrote the bibliographical article "Shakespeare in Hebrew Literature during the Enlightenment and the Renaissance".

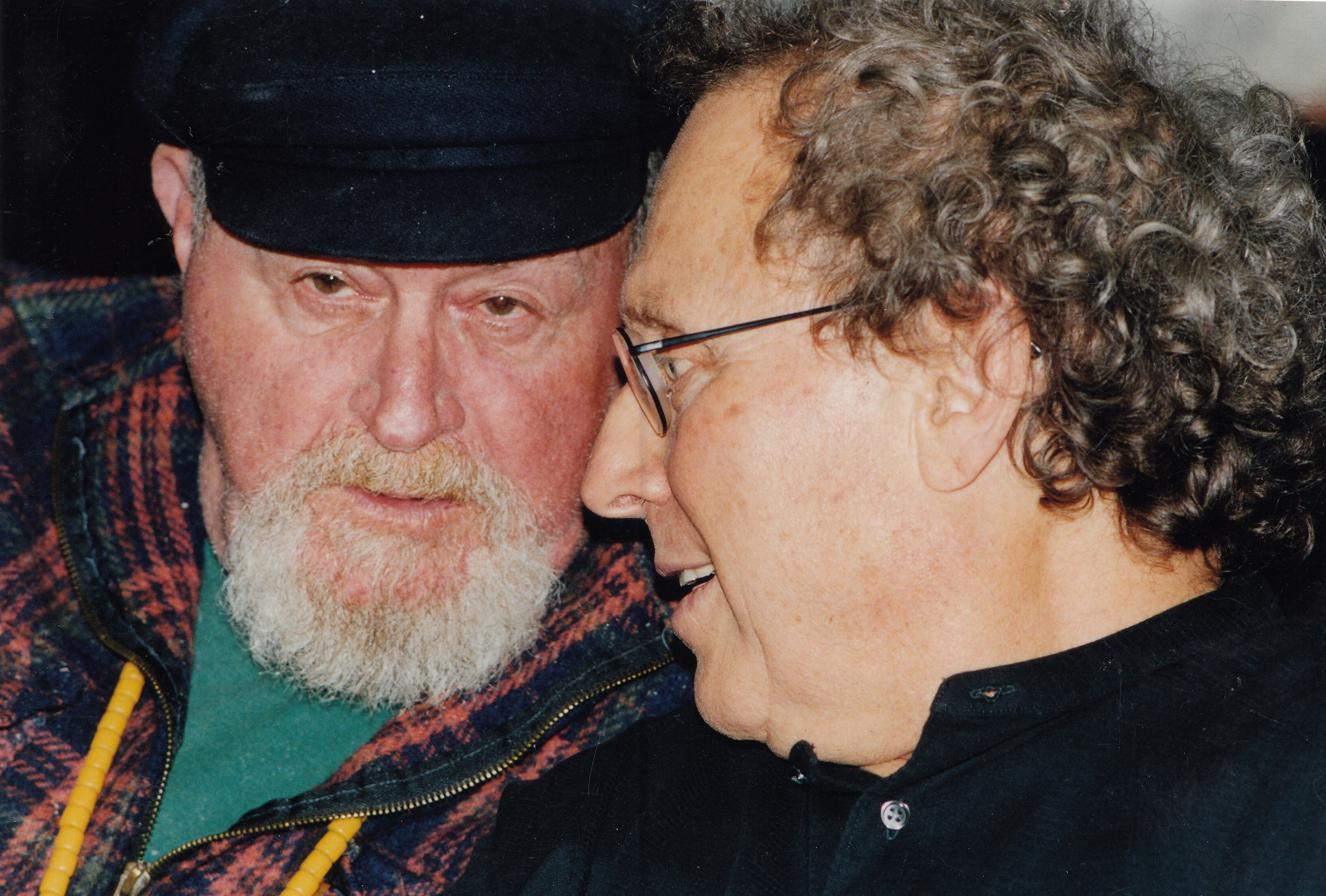
דן אלמגור ודידי מנוסי

== Translation, adaptation and original writing for the theatre ==
Almagor has adapted and translated about a hundred plays into Hebrew, including classical plays such as "The Phoenician Women" by Euripides, plays by William Shakespeare such as "The Comedy of Errors", "As You Like It", "Hamlet" and "A Midsummer Night's Dream", Elizabethan plays (from Shakespeare's time) such as "The Alchemist" by Ben Jonson and "The Cobbler's Feast" by Thomas Decker, "The Broken Jug" by Heinrich von Kleist from the 18th century, and many plays from the 20th century, such as "A View from the Bridge" and "Death of a Salesman" by Arthur Miller, "One Flew Over the Cuckoo's Nest" by Dale Wasserman and plays by Bertolt Brecht ("Brecht on Brecht" edited by George Tabori, "The Little Pleasures of Life" - a selection of Brecht's poems, and poems for the play "Schweick in World War II", which was performed at the Ohel Theater).

Almagor has translated numerous musicals, including: "My Fair Lady" (with Shraga Friedman), "Fiddler on the Roof", "The King and I", "Guys and Dolls" based on the stories of Damon Runyon, "A Funny Thing Happened on the Way to the Forum" by Stephen Sondheim, "Yentel" based on the film by Barbra Streisand, "The Producers", "Stop the World. I Want to Get Off" by Leslie Bricusse and Anthony Newley (1969, Gil Theatre). He has also translated and adapted several operettas: in 1972 he translated the operettas "Abu Hassan" by Weber and "The Deceived Caddy" by Gluck, which were commissioned by Gary Bertini for the Chamber Ensemble. In 1986 he translated the dialogues of the operetta "The Bat" by Johann Strauss, which was performed by the Israeli Sinfonetta in Beersheba.

Almagor also wrote many original plays. In 1968 he wrote and adapted the musical "Ish Hassid Haya" which consisted of Hassidic songs, melodies and stories. In 1969 he wrote the musical "My Jerusalem", which was the first play written about Jerusalem and its people after the annexation of the eastern part of the city following the Six-Day War. In 1967, he wrote a musical, with a biblical background, which was staged on Broadway, starring Dick Shawn, but the show was not a success and was quickly taken off the stage. In the early 1970s, Almagor composed two major musicals. In 1971, he composed "City of Men," which was influenced by the stories of Damon Runyon. In 1972, he composed "Don't Call Me Black," with all the songs composed by Benny Nagary. The show, which included an ensemble of seven actors and singers directed by Danny Litai, was influenced by the rise of the American civil rights movement and revolved around discrimination against blacks in the United States, and Bible stories. All the songs were in the style of soul music, a style that was not known in Israel at the time. The musical was a commercial success and was critically acclaimed and won the David Violin Award. In 1982, his play "Children of the City" was performed, which deals with the life of the Yemenite community in Israel. The play, starring Nissim Garame and directed by Tzedi Tsarfati, was performed throughout the country 250 times. Almagor also wrote two operas: in 1958, the opera "The Wind’s hiding place" composed by Frank Peleg for Kol Israel radio, and the children's opera "Max and Moritz" composed by Gil Shohat, which was performed at The Israeli Opera and produced by the Holon Mediatech. In addition, Almagor wrote the lyrics for the play "A Scandal in the Gymnasium" (also known as "The Married Student"), by Becky and Stella, translated by Dr. Emil Feuerstein, which were composed by Marc Lavry (Theater Do Re Mi, 1958).

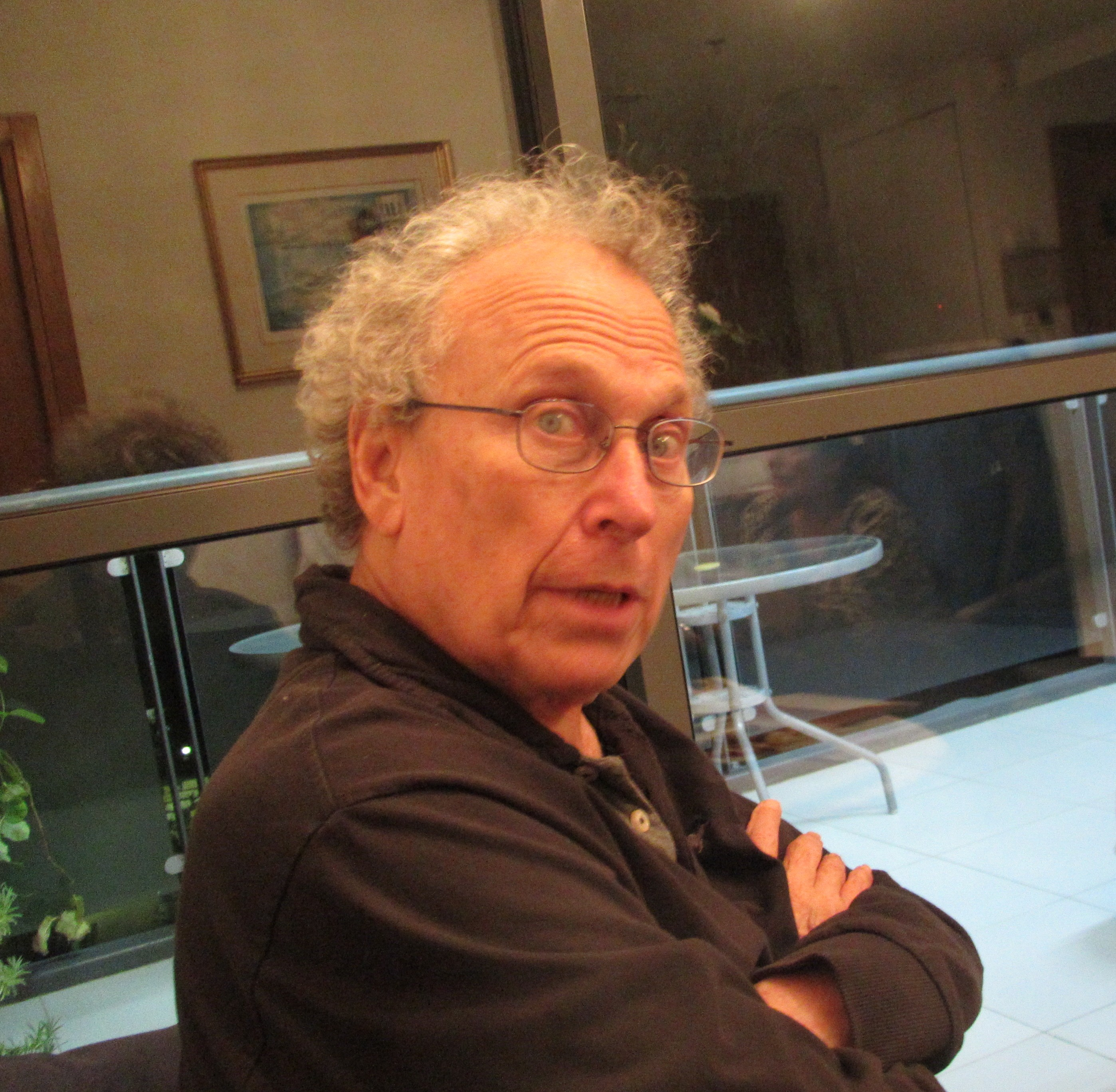
Dan Almagor, November 2011

== Lyrics ==
Almagor began writing at a very young age and wrote his first song at the age of 15. Since then he has written hundreds of songs for military entertainment troops, singers, musicals, theatre plays, and more. Many of his songs are very well known. His songs are distinguished by their wit and humour, as well as excellent rhyme. The content of the songs also reflects Almagor's broad intellectual world, and his songs deal with every field, from mythological episodes to events with a historical background. The greatest composers of Hebrew music have composed melodies to his lyrics, including Moshe Wilensky, Alexander 9Sasha) Argov, Dov Seltzer, Yair Rosenblum, Meir Noy and Matti Caspi.

Almagor wrote songs for the "Batzal Yarok" (the Green Onion) band, one of whose biggest hits was "Venezuela" to the tune of Wilensky. The original version of the song contained a geographical error ("We will sail across the Orinoco that flows into the Amazon"), which Almagor corrected after hearing about his mistake. During that period, he also wrote the songs "Rumia and Joel" and "Shir HaFalafel" for the "Ayalon Band", which were composed in an oriental style. He wrote songs for the first programs of the "Theatre Club Quartet", including "Brit France-Israel", "Goi Shel Shabbat", "Why Schubert didn’t complete the symphony” and more.

For the singer and composer Shimon Israeli he wrote "Haorchestra Shel Rishon" and "Torat hayachasim", and for Benny Berman he wrote the witty song "Hayei Adam", based on the fairy tale by the Brothers Grimm. The song describes how each animal donated years of his life to Adam, something that was reflected in the latter's behaviour ("He eats like a pig and sweats like a horse...").

In 1966, Almagor came to Israel, from his doctoral studies in California, to write songs for the musical "Kazablan". The musical's producer, Giora Godik, engaged a number of song writers including Amos Ettinger, Haim Hefer and Dan Almagor to work on the musical. Godik then credited Ettinger and Hefer with songs which were in fact written by Almagor. Almagor sued Godik and won. Judge Yosef Michael Lem ruled that the two central songs, "Kol Hakavod" and "Tered Mimenni Kazbalan" were indeed written by Almagor.

Yehoram Gaon performed the song "Kol Hakavod" in the musical "Kazablan", which became a big hit, and at the 1969 Song and Song Festival, he performed Almagor's song "Ballad for a Paramedic", composed by Efi Netzer and arranged by Shimon Cohen, expressing the heroic spirit of the IDF medics after the Six-Day War. The song won first place in the competition. Among the hits he wrote for the military entertainment troops are "Come to Us to the Sea", "May the Sea Be Quiet" and "Guardian of the Walls". Alongside these songs, Almagor also wrote the comic song "My Chaimke" (performed by Rachel Atas), which describes a proud mother of a schlemiel soldier who does not adapt to the army's orders.

In 1977, he wrote the lyrics for the musical film "Hershel" directed by Yoel Zilberg.

Almagor translated a number of French chansons, including: "Who Loves Obscene Words" by Georges Bressans, performed by Yossi Banai, and "The Bourgeois" by Jacques Berl, performed by The Dudaim duo. He also wrote original lyrics (not a translation) to the melody of a chanson of Bressans for a song that he called "Veyoyo Gam", which was performed by The Nahal Troup and later by Hava Alberstein.

Among his songs from musicals, Almagor wrote the songs "Yom Yavo" and "Calypso in Black and White" (from the musical "Don't Call Me Black"); "Pincas HaKatan", composed by Matti Caspi and sung by Sassi Keshet with the participation of Avirama Golan (from the musical "Ir Hagvarim"); "Abreimela Melamed" about someone who among other things, burned down his house on Lag BaOmer and forgot that the insurance ran out on Purim (from the play "Ish Hasid Haya") and the song "Yerushalaim Sheli" which describes different aspects of Jerusalem from the perspective of several characters from the city such as a peddler, a shoemaker and a soldier (from the musical "Yerushalaim Sheli"). Among the songs Almagor translated from foreign musicals are "If I Were Rich Man" (from Fiddler on the Roof) and "Get me to the church on time" (in collaboration with Shraga Friedman) (from My Fair Lady).

In 2006, a double collection of Almagor's songs was published entitled "Otherwise Everything Is Fine," which includes 43 of his composed songs. The collection's name comes from a song Almagor wrote based on a melody by Paul Mizraki from the 1930s.

There was an attempt by defence lawyers in the Shomrat rape trial to use one of Almagor's songs, "When You Say No," which was written in 1962 for the Hatarnegolim group and had been very popular, to excuse their client’s actions and deny criminal intent. In his ruling, Judge Michael Cheshin discussed the true meaning of the song. Almagor was appalled by this attempt to justify the crime and explained that the song was originally written as a song about childhood, describing the innocent courting by a boy of a girl. In his ruling, Judge Cheshin completely rejected the Defence lawyer’s interpretation of the line in the song, "Because you say 'no' so gracefully, it sounds even more inviting to me than 'yes.'" Following the rape trial, Almagor changed the third verse of the song to make his intentions absolutely clear and rewrote: "When she says 'no!' - that's what she means!"

In 2012, the book "The Kettle's Chupchick" was published, containing 300 of Almagor's songs.

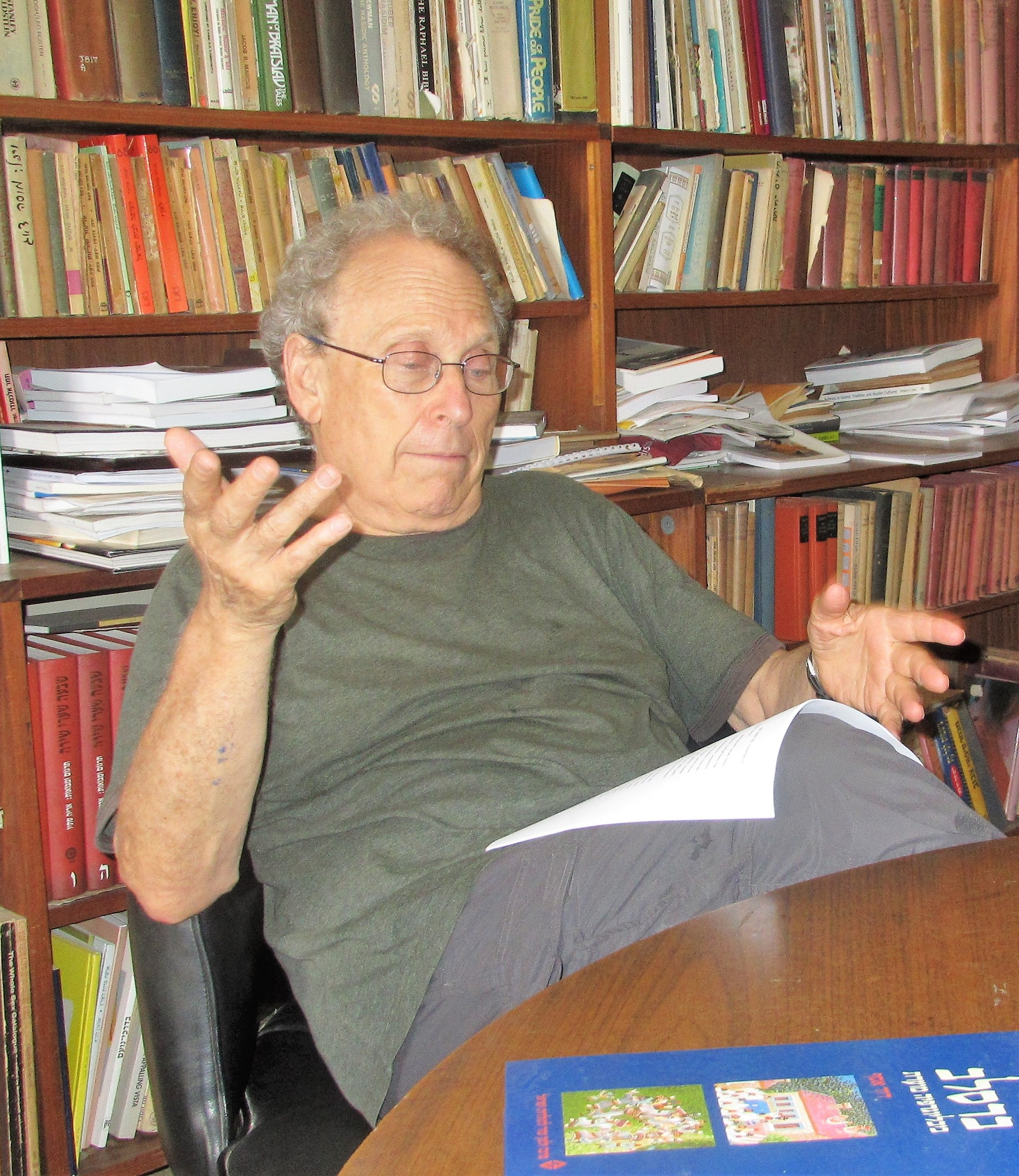
Dan Almagor, June 2012

== Radio and television program hosting ==
In 1956, Almagor wrote a weekly topical song that was broadcast on the "Noah's Ark" program on Kol Yisrael to the tune of Meir Noy. In 1957, he wrote with Moshe Wilensky the Galei Tzahal anthem ("Good evening to all of you, soldiers"), which was broadcast every evening at the opening of the station's programs. Between 1957 and 1959, he participated as a songwriter in the Kol Israel radio program "Three in One Boat," as well as in the programs "At the End of the Day," "Yanshufim Vehiyuchim" and "Bekhol Hamesibot."

In the early 1970s, he edited and hosted the monthly series "Yesterday's Songwriter" on Galei Tzahal, which dealt, among other things, with the songs of Nathan Alterman, Mordechai Zeira, Emmanuel Ha-Russi and Yaakov Orland. In 1972, he wrote for Galei Tzahal the first radio play written especially for the station, "So Said Emmanuel," based on "The Emanuel Notebooks" by Emmanuel the Roman, with the participation of Yehoram Gaon and Ze'ev Revach. Almagor was also gifted with a unique talent for presenting and was a presenter on Israeli television from the very beginning. In the early 1970s, he hosted and presented ten musical entertainment programs in the series "The Whistling Gypsy" directed by Israel Gurion, which mainly included translations of various folk songs performed by the best Israeli singers of the time, such as the Dudayim, Shlomo Artzi, Shmulik Kraus, Nitza Shaul and Tzipi Shavit. Each program dealt with songs on a different theme, such as: It's Good to Live, It's Good to Love, It's Good to Drink, It's Good to Stroll, It's Good to Keep in Touch and Today is Mother's Day. In 1974, after the Yom Kippur War, he presented about twenty hour-long programs in the series "I Sung to You, My Country" which dealt with a hundred years of Hebrew songs. Five of the first programs were edited and presented in collaboration with Eliyahu HaCohen, and the rest were edited and presented by Almagor. The program hosted performing artists such as Shoshana Damari, Shimon Israeli, Yehoram Gaon, Hava Alberstein, and many others. In addition, each episode included interviews ofsw personalities who reflected the period, including Golda Meir, Rachel Yanait Ben-Zvi, Baruch Agadaty, Daniel Sambursky, and Emmanuel Ha-Russi.

== Satire and political involvement ==
In addition to writing many songs for military entertainment troops, editing and presenting television series, and official performances by institutions such as the IDF, Keren Hayesod, and jubilee performances of the state, localities, and Zionist movements, since he began writing as a teenager, he also wrote satirical songs, political songs, and protest songs, mainly under the influence of Alterman's Seventh Column, which he admired from his youth. The first song in the history of the state to be rejected by the censorship for theatrical performances was the song "The Cap" (1958), in which Almagor protested against the Kafr Qasem massacre. It was written for the Sambation Theater and composed by Yohanan Zarai. In the 1950s, while still a student, he regularly participated in the radio program "Three in One Boat" as the program's lyricist, in which three of the songs he wrote for the program were rejected for broadcast due to their political nature. He also published political columns in the newspapers "Ha'olam Hazeh", "Etgar" and "Pi Ha'Aton".

Many political and satirical poems were included in the programs he wrote for the theatre club, including "Me-il ve Me-ila" (1960) and "Ta-ut Ketana Achat" (1961). In addition, he wrote critical songs for the Yossi-Hizki-Yona trio, including "The Little Citizen" (1961), and later for singer Shimon Israeli, including "Travel and Travel Around Israel" and "How to Tighten the Belt" written in 1989.

In his song "My Jerusalem" (1969), he made sure to represent - among the different points of view of Jerusalem - also the Palestinian perspective:

"The young man there, near the Nablus Gate, said:

My Jerusalem

is a cross on a shop, and policemen at midnight

A nurse who has been sleeping, and a pit with bombs

A nurse who has been sleeping, and a pit with bombs,

An Independence Day March and clenched hands.

'Yes sir! What would you like?

Kebab, shish kebab?' -

My Jerusalem..."

On March 26, 1976, the sixth anniversary of Nathan Alterman's death, Almagor published a poem in Haaretz called "The Silver Tray, 1976", in which Almagor protests against the awarding of the Yom Kippur War Medal to Moshe Dayan by Defense Minister Shimon Peres. The poem was also published as a paid advertisement in the newspapers Yedioth Ahronoth and Maariv by the Association of Bereaved Parents of the Home Front in Tel Aviv.

During the years of the first intifada, he published dozens of satirical columns in the newspapers "Davar" and "Hotam" (Al Hamishmar). On December 10, 1988, a year after the outbreak of the first intifada, Almagor stunned participants in the Yesh Gevul demonstration in Tel Aviv's Malchei Yisrael Square (now Rabin Square) by reciting a long protest poem entitled "We Shoot at Children Too," in which he accused officers who he claimed were responsible for killing children during the suppression of Palestinian demonstrations of war crimes. Alluding to the glass cell in which Adolf Eichmann sat during his trial in Israel, Almagor said: "We had better start preparing for ourselves the transparent cages in which we will sit when they judge us for what we did to the Palestinian people." The poem was printed in full that week in Ha'Olam Ha’zeh. Following the recitation of the poem at the protest rally and its publication in the newspaper, the then-Defense Minister Yitzhak Rabin announced in the Knesset that 54-year-old reservist Dan Almagor had been suspended from the Education Corps. And the IDF, and the then Prime Minister, Yitzhak Shamir, declared him in an official letter as one of the traitors to Israel. Almagor spoke about that period:

Yitzhak Shamir, who was the Prime Minister at the time, said that I was one of the traitors who rose up against the State of Israel, and then a series of murder threats began against my life and the lives of my family, and they sent death wishes to me. I went to the police... and the station commander explained to me that it was just a way of letting off steam. A little later they blew up my car and tried to burn down my house. Then the same commander came and apologized.

— (Itai Stern, hachupchik shel hakumkum, 1 March 2006)

On March 9, 1989, Almagor's car was set on fire. The radical right-wing organization "The Sikarikim" took responsibility for the act. During that time, he wrote his poem "Tselem Adam" (1989). The song was composed by Rafi Kadishson, and performed live on the program "Galgal HaMazalot", on the eve of Rosh Hashanah on Channel One, by Shimon Israeli, Danny Litani, Nira Rabinowitz, Eli Gorenstein, Gil Alon and others. It calls for humane behavior and preserving the human image even in times of war: "All humans are created in the image of God, All humans, there is none better and none more equal, all humans are created. So give us the strength not to lose the image, the image of a human being, Give us the strength, especially in these days, not to lose the image, Not to walk in the blood-stained furrow, Precisely in these days, give us the strength not to lose the image, the image of a human being" The song was broadcast only once that evening, but was adopted by the then Central Command Major General, Amram Mitzna, and was given to the Central Command Band for performance and recording, which sang it a number times and recorded it on educational television. A selection of Almagor's later satirical poems were collected in the final chapter of the book "The Kettle’s Chupchik", titled "Is This the Dream?".

== Personal life ==
Dan Almagor was married to Dr. Ella Almagor (née Applerot), a scholar of classical Arabic literature and translator of books and plays, from 1960 until her death in January 2022.[33] The couple has two daughters, Orna (born 1961) and Elinoar (born 1964), and four grandchildren. He wrote the hit "Venezuela" in honor of Ella (in the performance of the chorus, the suffix "Ella" is emphasized).

Lives in Tel Aviv.
