= Dov Seltzer =

Romanian-born Israeli composer and conductor (born 1931)

Dov (Dubi) Seltzer
- דב (דובי) זלצר
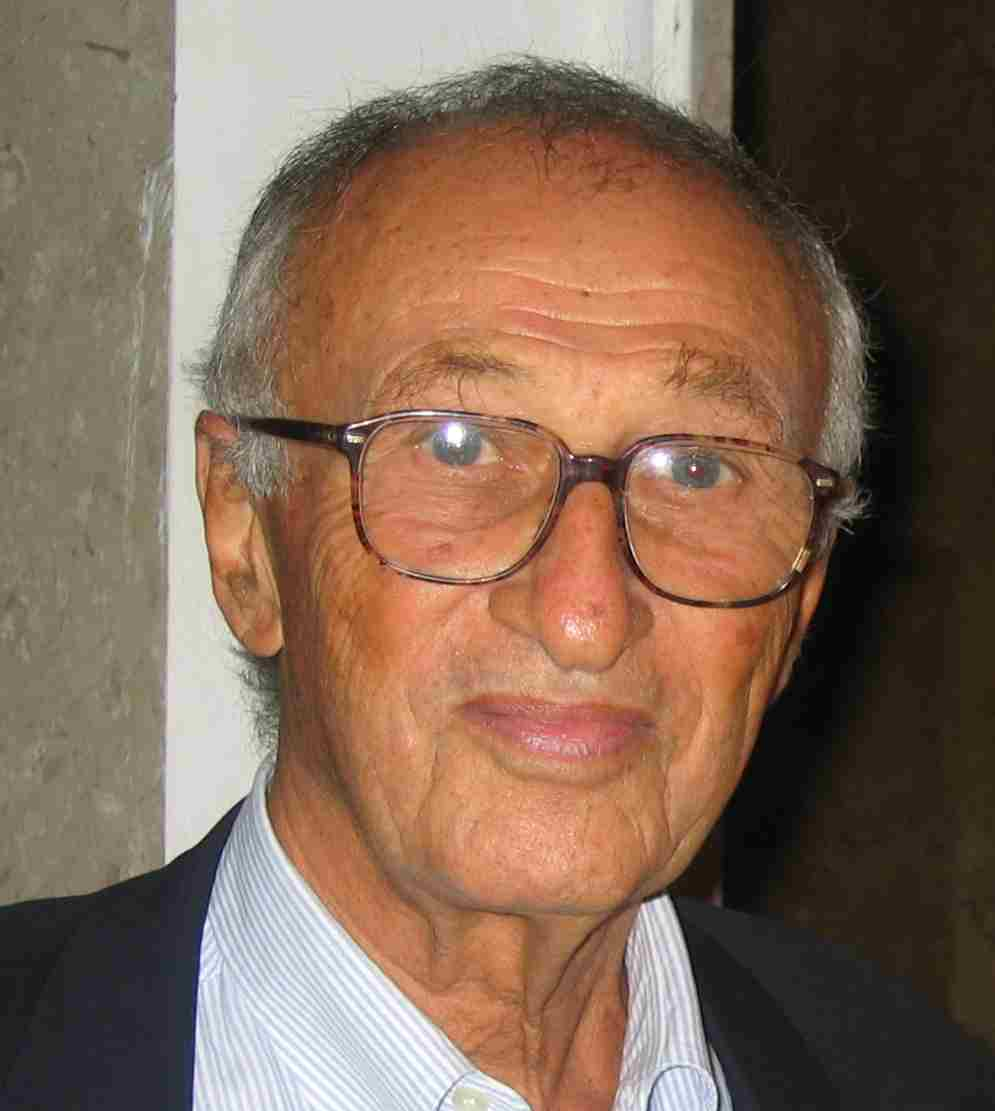
- Seltzer in 2007
- Born: January 26, 1931 (age 95); Iași, Kingdom of Romania
- Education: Mannes College of Music, State University of New York, The Juilliard School
- Occupations: Composer, conductor

Dov "Dubi" Seltzer (Hebrew: דב (דובי) זלצר; born 1931) is a Romanian-born Israeli composer and conductor.

== Early life and education ==
Seltzer was born in Iași, Romania, and raised in Bucharest, where he began studying music at an early age. He received instruction in music theory and harmony from Alfred Mendelsohn and Mihail Jora. At the age of 15, he immigrated to Mandatory Palestine. A musical comedy he had composed prior to his emigration continued to be performed for two years by a professional youth theater in Bucharest. He completed his secondary education while living in Kibbutz Mishmar HaEmek. On the recommendation of pianist Frank Pelleg, he was awarded a scholarship to pursue further musical studies at conservatories in Haifa and Tel Aviv.

At 18, Seltzer joined the Israel Defense Forces, where he became one of the founders and the first official composer of the Lehakat HaNahal military ensemble. His work with the ensemble and subsequent compositions became part of the core repertoire of Israeli music. He also performed as an accordionist and arranger for the Israeli musical group Oranim Zabar, and was married to its lead singer, Geula Gill.

During his military service, Seltzer received a special grant to study composition, harmony, and counterpoint with composers Herbert Brün, Mordechai Seter, and Abel Ehrlich.

Following his military service, Seltzer pursued advanced music education in the United States. He earned a diploma in composition from the Mannes College of Music and a Bachelor of Science degree in music, with a focus on conducting and composition, from the State University of New York. His instructors included Felix Salzer and Robert Starer. He has also stated that he attended the Juilliard School in New York City.

== Professional career ==
Following his return to Israel, Seltzer pursued a career in music with a focus on musical theater. He also composed scores for more than forty full-length feature films, including productions from Israel, the United States, Italy, Germany, and France.

Seltzer composed several symphonic works that were commissioned and performed by the Israel Philharmonic Orchestra and the Jerusalem Symphony Orchestra. He also conducted both orchestras in performances of his own compositions, reportedly becoming the first Israeli composer to do so. His works have been performed by major Israeli orchestras, as well as by the New York Philharmonic, the Queens Symphony, and the British Chamber Orchestra. His compositions have been conducted and performed by artists including Zubin Mehta, Kurt Masur, Yehudi Menuhin, and Yitzhak Perlman.

== Awards and recognition ==
Seltzer has received multiple awards in recognition of his contributions to Israeli music. He is a two-time recipient of the Kinor David, and has been honored with the Judges' Award from the Society of Authors, Composers and Music Publishers in Israelfor lifetime achievement. In 2009, he was awarded the Israel Prize for lifetime achievement and his contribution to Israeli music.

- 1967 – Rumpelstiltskin, a musical with music by Seltzer, received the Prize of the City of Tel Aviv for Best Musical Play of the Year.
- 1968 – Awarded the Kinor David as Best Screen and Theater Composer of the Year.
- 1969 – The stage version of Kazablan, with music by Seltzer, received the Prize of the City of Tel Aviv for Best Musical Play of the Year.
- 1970 – Received the Kinor David for Best Screen and Theater Composer of the Year.
- 1971 – Yadaim (Hands), with music by Seltzer, received the Ministry of Industry and Commerce Prize for Best Documentary Film and Best Score for a Documentary Film.
- 1973 – I Love You Rosa, directed by Moshé Mizrahi with music by Seltzer, was nominated for the Academy Award for Best Foreign Language Film.
- 1974 – The title song from the film version of Kazablan was nominated for a Golden Globe Award.
- 1985 – Awarded the Itzik Manger Prize for contributions to Jewish and Yiddish music and culture.
- 1985 – Received the ACUM Jury Award for lifetime achievement.
- 1989 – Received the Sholom Aleichem House Award for Contribution and Creativity in the Field of Jewish Culture.
- 2000 – Received the Prime Minister’s Prize for Israeli Composers for the work Lament for Yitzhak.
- 2006 – Awarded the Prize of the Minister of Culture, Science and Sport for Lifetime Contribution to Israeli Song and Music.
- 2009 – Received the Israel Prize for lifetime achievement across multiple genres, including popular song, musical theater, film scores, and symphonic music.
- 2014 – Received the Theater Prize for Lifetime Achievement.

== Musicals ==
(Partial list)

- The Megilah – Musical based on the poetic libretto Songs of the Megillah (in Yiddish) by the famous poet Itzik Manger. After the original run (450 performances), the musical had five additional theater productions (one of them on Broadway) and three film versions.
- Kazablan
- I Like Mike – Musical produced at the Alhambra Theater in Tel Aviv (one year run).
- To Live Another Summer – at the Helen Hayes Theater on Broadway.
- Comme la neige en été – at the Théâtre des Variétés in Paris.
- Ootz Li Gootz Li (Rumpelstilskin) – Musical for children (more than 1,500 performances in 8 different productions for more than thirty years).
- Choumesh Lider (Songs of the Bible) – Musical (in Hebrew and Yiddish) based on a poetic cycle by Itzik Manger (four different productions).

== Film Scores ==
(Partial list)

- Escape to the Sun
- Entebbe: Operation Thunderbolt
- The Assisi Underground
- The Ambassador
- Forced Witness – A Raphael Rebibo film, starring Anat Atzmon(1984)(Drame).
- Buba – First Prize at the Rio Film Festival (1987) (Thriller).
- Moses the Lawgiver
- A Place by The sea – A Raphael Rebibo film, starring Anat Zahor and Alon Aboutboul(1989)(Love Story).
- Kazablan
- I Love You Rosa
- Ramat Aviv Gimel – Music and title song for the longest running Israeli TV series.

== Symphonic works ==
- Stempeniu – a dramatic poem based on the novel by Shalom Aleichem. The work is for actor/narrator, solo violin, and symphony orchestra. It was commissioned and given its premiere performance by Maestro Zubin Mehta with the Israel Philharmonic Orchestra. (Repeat performances by the Jerusalem Symphony Orchestra and the Ra'anana Symphonette).
- Rhapsodie Hassidique – for violin and enlarged chamber orchestra, was commissioned and performed by Yehudi Menuhin in London with the English Chamber Orchestra, conducted by the composer. (Repeat performances by the Ra'anana Symphonette and the Europa Philharmonie with Michael Guttman playing the solo part).
- This Scroll – an ode to the Israeli Declaration of Independence, written for baritone solo, mixed choir, and symphony orchestra. The work was composed in honour of the 100th anniversary of the birth of David Ben-Gurion. World premiere by the Haifa Symphony Orchestra, conducted by Stanley Sperber. Solo baritone – Yehoram Gaon. (Repeat performances by the Israel Philharmonic Orchestra, the Queens Symphony, and the Beer-Sheva Symphonette).
- The Gold of the Ashes – a symphonic poem with solo mezzo-soprano, children's choir, and symphony orchestra. Composed for the 500-year commemoration of the expulsion of Jews from Spain. The world premiere of the work was performed by the Jerusalem Symphony Orchestra, conducted by the composer.
- The Poetry and Prophecy of the Bible – a symphonic suite with narrators reading texts from the Bible, including "The Creation", "The Expulsion from Paradise", "By the Rivers of Babylon", "The Vision of Isa'ya", and "Song of Songs" (record featuring Theodore Bikel as narrator, the Vienna Symphony, and Dov Seltzer conducting).
- Tradition – nine old Jewish songs, arranged for violin and symphony orchestra. CD featuring Yitzhak Perlman and the Israel Philharmonic Orchestra conducted by the composer. Live performance by the IPO conducted by Zubin Mehta.
- Lament for Yitzhak – a Requiem in memory of Yitzhak Rabin was premiered in April 1998 by the Israel Philharmonic Orchestra, with the New Israeli Opera Choir, the Ankor Children's Choir, and four soloists, under the baton of Maestro Zubin Mehta, at the Mann Auditorium in Tel Aviv, as the festive opening of Israel's 50th anniversary celebrations. Repeat performance by the New York Philharmonic, conducted by Maestro Kurt Masur at Avery Fisher Hall – 1999 Lincoln Center Festival. Repeat performance by the Santa Cecilia Choir and Orchestra conducted by maestro Lorin Maazel, Auditorium Santa Cecilia, Roma, Italy.
- Evening of Life – Cycle of four songs to words by Avraham Sutzkever, written for symphonic orchestra and soprano solo. Premiered in October 2007 by the Israel Philharmonic Orchestra under the baton of maestro Zubin Mehta.
- Esmeralda – based on the famous novel by Victor Hugo, "The Hunchback of Notre Dame". Libretto by the French writer Jacques Rampal.

== Discography ==
(Partial list)

- "Hora! Songs and Dances of Israel" by the Oranim Zabar Troupe (with Geula Gill), Elektra, 1960
- Songs after the War – with Geula Gil Trio, 1967
- Ootz Li Gootz Li – Musical, the Cameri Theater of Tel Aviv
- Hamegileh – Musical with the Burstein family
- Kazablan – Musical
- I like Mike – Musical
- Yehoram Gaon 79 – songs of Haim Heffer and Dov Seltzer 1979
- Revisor – Musical
- Tradition – Jewish melodies, with Yitzhak Perlman and the Israel Philharmonic Orchestra
- Humesh Lieder – Musical
- The Best of Dov Seltzer – song selection
- Lament for Yitzhak – with the Israel Philharmonic Orchestra, conductor Zubin Mehta

== Song Book ==
- The Melody Maker, Kineret, Zmora-Bitan, Dvir Publishing House Ltd. 2011

== See also ==
- Music in Israel
