= Don't Step on My Olive Branch =

- Original Broadway Playbill
- Music: Ron Eliran
- Lyrics: Ron Eliran
- Book: Harvey Jacobs
- Productions: 1976 Broadway

Don't Step on My Olive Branch is a musical conceived by Jonathan Karmon, with music and lyrics by Ron Eliran and a book by Harvey Jacobs. It is an Israeli musical in English. It was originally presented with no intermission in revue form with the numbers commenting on international affairs (usually satirically).

== Original Broadway production ==
The original production opened on Broadway at the Playhouse on November 1, 1976 and closed on November 14, 1976 after 16 performances. The show was directed and choreographed by Jonathan Karmon, musical direction by David Krivoshei, scenery James Tilton, costumes Pierre D'Alby, lighting William H. Bachelder, production stage manager Daniel E. Early, stage manager Karen Winer, and press by Max Eisen.

The cast included Gail Benedict, Darleen Boudreaux, Karen DiBianco, Ron Eliran, Carla Farnsworth, Riki Gal, Hanan Goldblatt, David Kottke, Ruthi Navon, Rivka Raz, Joel Robertson, Donald Ronci, Lisa Gould Rubin, Daniel Stewart, and John Windsor.

== Musical numbers ==
- "Moonlight"
- "The World's Greatest Magical Act"
- "I Believe"
- "Only Love"
- "My Land"
- "We Love a Conference"
- "Come With Me"
- "Tired Heroes"
- "Have a Little Fun"
- "I Hear a Song"
- "I Live My Life in Color"
- "Young Days"
- "Somebody's Stepping on My Olive Branch"
- "It Was Worth It"
- "Jerusalem"
