= Zmora =

Zmora (Hebrew: זמורה) is a Hebrew surname. Notable people with the surname include:

- Esther Zmora (1890–1951), Mandate Palestine and Israeli women's activist, head of the Women's International Zionist Organization (1933–1941)
- Israel Zmora (1899–1983), Israeli editor, literary critic, and publisher
- Michal Zmora-Cohen (1926–2015), Israeli pianist and musicologist
- Moshe Zmora (1888–1961), Israeli jurist, the first President of the Supreme Court of Israel
- Ohad Zmora, journalist, editor, and former co-owner of Kinneret Zmora-Bitan Dvir, Israeli publisher
- Ruthi Navon Zmora (by marriage to Yosef Zmora) (born 1954), Israeli singer and actress
