= Moraly =

Moraly may refer to:

- Bernard Moraly (born 1957), French footballer
- Yehuda Moraly (born 1948), Israeli academic
