= Geula Gill =

Geula Gill גאולה גיל
- Born: 24 December 1932 (age 93); Tel Aviv, Mandatory Palestine (Israel)
- Genres: Israeli music
- Occupations: Singer, actress
- Instrument: Vocals
- Labels: Folkways; Elektra; Columbia
- Formerly of: Oranim Zabar Trio
- Spouse: Dov Seltzer

Geula Gill (Hebrew: גאולה גיל; born 24 December 1932) is an Israeli singer and actress. Described as a "dark-haired beauty with excellent stage personality and great musical versatility", she was nominated for the Tony Award for Best Featured Actress in a Musical for her performance in The Grand Music Hall of Israel (1968).

== Career ==
One of her first solo albums, Yemenite and Other Israel Folk Songs (1958), was released by Folkways Records. Nat Hentoff, writing for HiFi & Music Review, recommended the album and wrote that it was "sung incisively and with exciting rhythmic flexibility by Geula Gill."

In the early 1960s, she performed with the Oranim Zabar group. Oranim Zabar also included arranger and accordionist Dov Seltzer (Gill's husband at the time) and guitarist and drummer Michael Kagan. The trio's repertoire included songs in Hebrew, English, Spanish, French, and other languages. In February 1961, the Oranim Zabar trio gave a concert at The Town Hall in New York City. In its review of the performance, the New York Times critic stated, "Miss Gill, the featured member of the group, is a dynamic singer who projects the emotional import of her songs quite meaningfully."

In October 1967, Gill had a top 10 hit single in Israel with "To the Victor".

In February 1968, Gill appeared in the revue The Grand Music Hall of Israel at Broadway's Palace Theatre in New York City. William Glover, the Associated Press drama critic, praised her performance: "Among the vocalists, Geula Gill is a standout. A raven-tressed petite possessed of a velvety yodel, Miss Gill does hypnotic things to 'The Sound of Music', 'Hava Nagila' and less familiar pieces." Jack Gaver, the UPI drama editor, also commended Gill's work: "The outstanding individual hit is scored by pert Geula Gill, who can sing up a storm in any language. […] Miss Gill would be a sensation in any night club or variety show."

== Discography (partial) ==
- Holiday Songs of Israel (1958)
- Yemenite and Other Israel Folk Songs (1958)
- Theodore Bikel and Geula Gill Sing Folk Songs from Just About Everywhere (1959)
- Shalom! (1960)
- Around the Campfire (1960)
- Hora (Songs and Dances of Israel) (1960)
- A Town Hall Concert (1961)
- The Whole World Dances (1961)
- The Exciting World of Geula Gill (1962)
- Songs of the 6-Day War (1967)
- Now (1968)
- On Tour (1968)
