= Amos Ettinger =

Israeli radio and television presenter (1937–2023)

- עמוס אטינגר
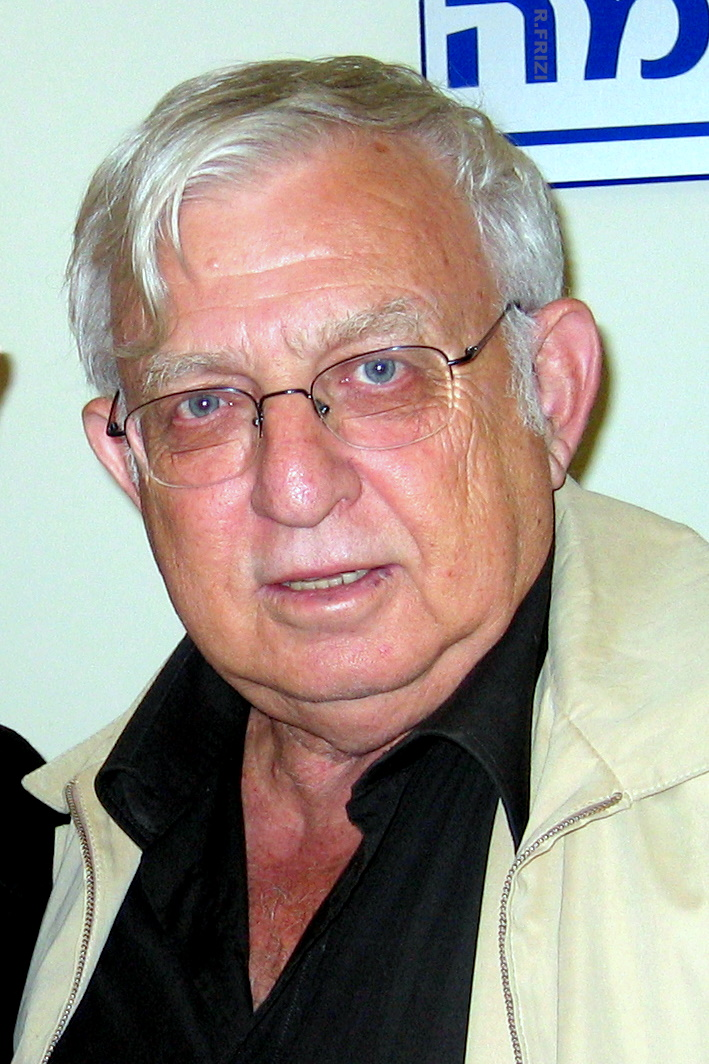
- Ettinger in 2006

Personal details
- Born: 15 September 1937 Tel Aviv, Mandatory Palestine
- Died: 6 December 2023 (aged 86)

Amos Ettinger (Hebrew: עמוס אטינגר; 15 September 1937 – 6 December 2023) was an Israeli songwriter, screenwriter and radio broadcaster, widely known as the host of This Is Your Life from its debut as a radio show (1966–1972) and prominently as its television presenter (1972–2000).

== Biography ==
Ettinger served in the Central Command Band for his military service.

Ettinger began working in Kol Yisrael in 1959 and was best known for hosting "This is Your Life", from its radio debut and later as its sole host and interviewer on television for three decades.

Ettinger wrote dozens of popular Israeli songs. Among his best known songs are Sharm El Sheikh, the musical Kazablan and the Golani Brigade's official anthem.

Ettinger died on 6 December 2023, at the age of 86.
