= Reinhard Seehafer =

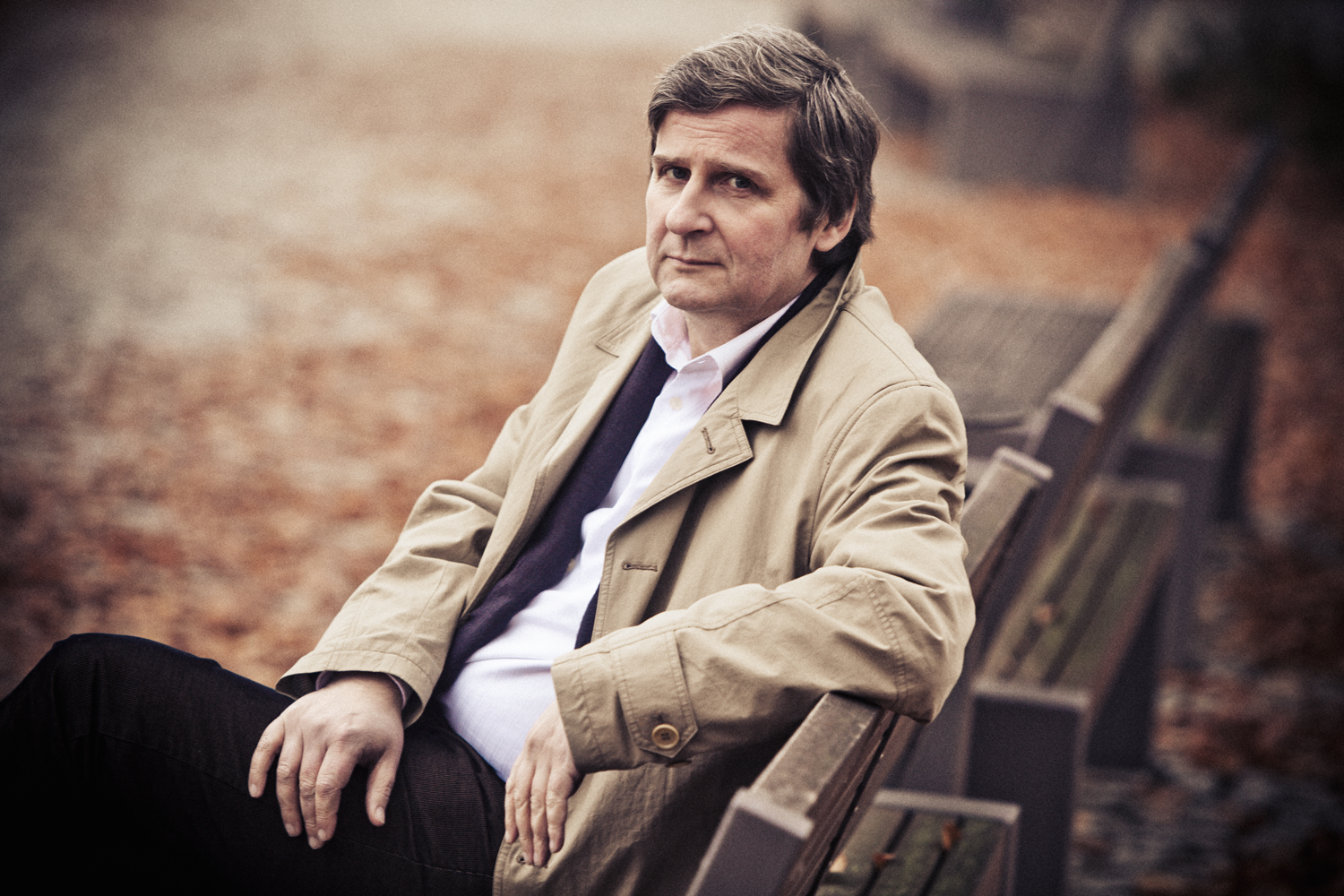
Reinhard Seehafer

Reinhard Seehafer (born September 6, 1958) is a German conductor, pianist, composer of contemporary classical music and the founder and artistic director of the Festival Altmark Festspiele in Saxony Anhalt.

== Biography ==
At the age of 5 years, Reinhard Seehafer received his first piano lessons. In addition, he composed little piano pieces, chamber music and songs. As a young musician, he was a prizewinner at the Beethoven Piano Competition and Improvisation Competition Weimar in Germany. In 1975, the music director Rolf Reuter recognized the talent of the young pianist and composer, and taught him in his conducting class at the Academy of Music and Drama "Felix Mendelssohn Bartholdy" Leipzig alongside Georg Christoph Biller (Thomaskantor from 1992 to 2015), and Claus Peter Flor. From 1976 to 1982 Reinhard Seehafer studied with Rolf Reuter and Kurt Masur, and subsequently with Otmar Suitner and Leonard Bernstein.

In 1982 he created a sensation with Giacomo Puccini's Madame Butterfly at the Komische Oper Berlin, and was immediately engaged there. He worked with directors and choreographers such as Harry Kupfer, Joachim Herz and Tom Schilling. In 1989 he became principal conductor and artistic director of the opera house of Görlitz.

In 1991, together with the director of the opera house Görlitz, Wolf-Dieter Ludwig (born 1928 in Legnica; died 2007 in Sanary sur Mer), Reinhard Seehafer co-founded the cross-cultural project EUROPERA where he was musical director and principal conductor until 1998. In the same year he founded the Europa Philharmonie, where he is principal conductor to this day. Furthermore, Reinhard Seehafer has performed at Dresden Staatskapelle and Semper Opera, at Gewandhaus Orchestra and Oper Leipzig, Staatskapelle Weimar, the German National Theater, Dresden Philharmonic, Arthur Rubinstein Philharmonic Orchestra of Lodz, Borusan Istanbul Philharmonic Orchestra, National Orchestra of the Bolshoi Theater in Minsk, Orquesta Sinfonica Nacional de Bogota, Konzerthausorchester Berlin, Belgrade Philharmonic Orchestra, Jerusalem Symphony Orchestra, Orchestra Sinfonica di Roma, Amazonas Filarmônica, Orchestra dell'Arena di Verona, Orchestra Sinfonica Siciliana, Sofia Philharmonic Orchestra, Philharmonia Moments Musicaux Taipei, Hermitage Orchestra St. Petersburg, Orquesta Sinfónica del Estado de México as well as in China, UAE, USA and Japan.

In his compositional work, Reinhard Seehafer has dedicated himself to various genres and styles. In addition to chamber music and opera, large symphonic works hold a central position in its activities as a composer. In 2007, Reinhard Seehafer created a newly reconstructed version of Germany's first opera, "Dafne" which was lost during the Thirty Years' War, on the basis of the original libretto by Martin Opitz to music by Heinrich Schütz.

Reinhard Seehafer has four children, 2 daughters, from his first marriage with harpist Cornelia Smaczny — and lives with his second wife, singer and chairman of the Society "Europa Philharmonie", Carmen Seehafer, who is ten years his junior, together with their son and daughter.

== Compositions ==
- Trio für Klavier, Violine und Violoncello Six Variations sur un theme des trouveres (1999)
- Parable (2002)
- Die Wüste hat zwölf Ding (2002)
- Concert for Cello and Orchestra (2003)
- Sinfonie Nr.1 (2003)
- Oper „Hochzeit an der Elbe“ (2004)
- Sinfonietta Dauna (2005)
- Amadeus-Fantasy (2005)
- Land of Enchantment (2006)
- Dafne reconstructed version of Germany's first opera by Heinrich Schütz and Martin Opitz (2007)
- BachTrium (2007)
- Mondviole Poem für Viola, Bariton und Orchester (2007)
- Leaving Saturn (2008)
- Esther Bearbeitung der biblischen Oper von Joseph Messner (2008)
- Ludus quadruplus ad honorem Henning Kagermann Konzert für 2 Klaviere zu acht Händen und Orchester (2009)
- Konzert für Violine, Tuba und Orchester (2009)
- The Crucified Planet Oratorium (2010)
- Piano Quintet (2011)
