= Ruthi Navon =

Israeli Jewish singer and actress (born 1954)

Ruthi Navon רותי נבון
- Born: 30 May 1951; Haifa, Israel
- Origin: Miami, Florida
- Genres: Jewish music, pop, folk
- Occupations: Singer, actress
- Years active: 1972–present
- Label: Hed Arzi

Ruth "Ruthi" Navon Zmora (Hebrew: רותי נבון; born 30 May 1951) is an Israeli Jewish singer and actress. She first came to prominence in the 1970s with her role in the Broadway musical Don't Step on My Olive Branch and her self-titled debut album, which sold well in her home country. After becoming religious through Chabad, she began a new career in the 1980s as a religious Jewish singer, beginning with the album Lead Me to Your Way (1988), which was marked "For Women Only" in accordance with kol isha. She has toured throughout the United States, Europe, and South Africa.

== Early life ==
Navon was born as Ruth Navon on 30 May 1951 in Haifa, Israel to Yitzhak Navon, a former Israeli ambassador to Thailand, and Miriam Navon, a painter. Both of her parents sang; her father was a tenor, while her mother was a coloratura soprano. As a teenager, she served in the Israel Defense Forces and performed in the army's Entertainment Corps.

Navon became a baalat teshuva to Chabad Judaism in her 20s. Her spiritual searching began in 1974, when she survived a car accident that killed a 21-year-old woman. She was further motivated to observance after meeting with the Lubavitcher Rebbe while living in Manhattan.

== Career ==
=== Broadway and debut album ===
Navon played the lead role in Don't Call Me Black (1972), an Israeli musical about race relations. Her self-titled debut album, released in 1973 by Hed Arzi Music, featured compositions from Nurit Hirsh, Kobi Oshrat, Yehonatan Geffen, Misha Segal, Dan Almagor, Yair Rosenblum, Leah Goldberg, and Ehud Manor. She performed the song Netzach Yisrael Lo Yeshaker at Israel's 25th Independence Day celebration. Her music was used on the Channel 1 children's program Rosh Kruv (Cabbage Head).

She made her Broadway debut in Ran Eliran's musical Don't Step on My Olive Branch, which opened in 1976 at the Playhouse Theatre. Clive Barnes of The New York Times praised her performance as "handsome and eloquent". She released a cover of Shel Silverstein's "The Ballad of Lucy Jordan" in 1980 through Polydor Records. The following year, she performed at a Musical Tribute to Jerusalem at Carnegie Hall alongside Shlomo Carlebach and poet Gerald Stern.

=== Religious career ===
Due to her increasing religious observance, Navon gave her first all-female concert in 1984 at the International Convention Center in Jerusalem. She subsequently released her second album, 1988's Lead Me to Your Way, which was marked "For Women and Girls Only" and included a personal message to fans. The following year, she performed at an event in Philadelphia commemorating the one-year anniversary of the death of Chaya Mushka Schneerson, the Lubavitcher Rebbetzin.

In June 2006, she performed at the Jewish National Fund of Canada's Negev Gala in Winnipeg, Manitoba, alongside Ilanit, Yardena Arazi, Shlomit Aharon, and Margalit Tzan'ani. She released a new album, B'Hiluch Gavoha (In High Gear) in 2008.

== Artistry ==
Reviewing a 1975 performance in Manhattan, journalist Howard Thompson wrote "...[W]ith expressive eyes and a voice like a bell, Miss Navon is equally at home rendering a Hasidic medley, a crackling 'Don't Let It Rain on My Parade,' [and] the plaintive ballad 'Feelings'." A Billboard review of her single "One Little Hour" noted that she "sounds a bit like Olivia Newton-John at times".

Since becoming religiously observant, Navon has fulfilled the rabbinic law of kol isha by performing only for women (with the exception of onstage personnel such as musicians and sound mixers). She has stated that such concerts liberate women from "following the man, asking, 'What will he think if I act like this? What will he think if I act like that?' In Israel, they get up and dance right in the middle of the room." She has been noted alongside artists like Kineret and Julia Blum as a prominent adherent of this custom.

She sings in multiple languages, including English, Hebrew, Yiddish, and Ladino, reportedly asking the audience during one performance, "Did you ever hear a sabra sing in Yiddish?" Her performances often incorporate personal anecdotes and audience participation, as she explains: "I get to know the audience and they get to know me, and in between we have songs. I like to keep it casual."

== Personal life ==
Navon currently lives in Miami, Florida with husband Yossi Zmora, whom she married in 1980.

== Discography ==
=== Albums ===
- Ruthi Navon (1973, Hed Arzi Music)
- Lead Me to Your Way (1988)
- Live - A Journey to Myself (2002)
- B'Hiluch Gavoha (In High Gear) (2008)

=== Singles ===
- "One Little Hour" / "You'll Never Be Lonely Again" (1975)
- "The Ballad of Lucy Jordan" (1980, Polydor)

== Stage performances ==
- Don't Call Me Black (1972)
- Don't Step on My Olive Branch (1976)
