= The Boy Across the Street =

The Boy Across the Street (Hebrew: הילד מעבר לרחוב) is an Israeli film directed by Yosef Shalhin and produced by Leo Filler and Margot Klausner. The film sold 514,600 tickets and won excellence merit in the children's movies category at the Venice Film Festival.

== Plot ==
David (Shaul Shalhin) is a twelve-year-old boy living with his father (Arieh Elias). The father quit his job and god drunk after his wife left home and become penniless, unable to support his only child. The father alienated his son and hit him, David's only comfort is his loyal dog and his neighbour Tamar (Hannah Shalhin), a cripple girl he is hanging around with. Two culprits offers him a solution to his financial mishap: they ask him to join them to a burglary. The burglary happened to be a failure, his two partners arrested and the police try to catch David. David's father, see his son's misfortune, went to his aid.

== Cast ==
- Shaul Shalhin – David
- Arieh Elias – David's father
- Hannah Shalhin – Tamar
- David Baruch – Tamar's father
- Ya'ackov Banai – Grocery salesman
