= Waiting for Godik =

Waiting for Годик
- Theatrical release poster
- Directed by: Ari Davidovich
- Written by: David Davidovich
- Produced by: Amir Harel
- Production company: Lama Productions
- Distributed by: Second Television and Radio Authority
- Release date: July 10, 2007 (Jerusalem Film Festival)
- Running time: 60 minutes
- Country: Israel
- Language: Hebrew

Waiting for Godik is a 2007 documentary written and directed by Ari Davidovich, chronicling the rise and fall of the Israeli theater producer and impresario Giora Godik.

== Subject ==
According to the description on the Internet Movie Database, this documentary "tells the story of the rise and fall of the Israeli King of Musicals, legendary producer and impresario Giora Godik. The tragic story of the man, who touched the dream and crashed, is also the story of an unforgettable era and the tale of the local version of the musical genre." Originally establishing himself by bringing performers including Marlene Dietrich to Israel he established the "Godik Theater," becoming famous for producing Hebrew language versions of American and international musical comedies to the Israel stage. "At its peak," the enterprise managed by Godik "had about 200 employees, and paid very high salaries to dozens of actors, singers, musicians, directors, and dancers."

"Godik, one of the prominent symbols of Israel's happy 60s, endeavored, in his way, to bring the American dream to Tel Aviv. However, the dream was shattered when Godik skyrocketed to the top and plummeted to the lowest depths." After losing his money and accumulating massive debts, Godik fled to Germany, "utterly destitute," where he ended up selling hot-dogs at the central railway station in Frankfurt.

According to Davidovich, the film's writer and director, the documentary "brings back to life the story of a man who believed that life was a musical." Through the story of Godik's successes and failures, "a bygone historical era in Tel Aviv is also exposed."

== Production ==
Produced and released in 2007, the 60-minute film can be classified as a musical documentary because it includes a number of songs from Godik's productions. The documentary was produced by Amir Harel. for the production company Lama Productions, and distributed by Israel's "Second Television and Radio Authority." It was filmed in Hebrew, and distributed with subtitles available in English and French.

The film had its international premiere at the Jerusalem Film Festival, and its U.S. premiere at the 2008 Los Angeles 23rd Israel Film Festival. Its U.S. East Coast premiere was in October 2008 at New York's 23rd Israel Film Festival.

== Awards, screenings, and response ==
At its Jerusalem premiere, the film was nominated for the Wolgin Award for Best Documentary. Since then, it has been shown at a number of International Film Festivals.

Much of the press response to the film focused on Godik's role in the rejection of proposals for an Israeli visit and concert by the Beatles in the 1960s. While some had believed that the government had decided to ban the group because of the potential for negative impact on its young people, the film reveals that Godik worked to block a visit that would have been coordinated by a rival producer, after he himself had turned down the chance to bring the singers to Israel, later realizing that it was one of the biggest mistakes of his career.
