= Sharm El Sheikh (song) =

Israeli song by Yoel Dan

Sharm El Sheikh is an Israeli song that commemorates the capture of Sharm El Sheikh during the Six-Day War. The song was sung by Yoel Dan and written by Dan, Ran Eliran, and Amos Ettinger.

== History ==
On the eve of the Six-Day War, the Israeli public feared a dramatic defeat. Ran Eliran volunteered at the start of the war to entertain the troops. On the road between performances in the Sinai Desert, the song Sharm El Sheikh was born.

Eliran earned a gold record. It was not only heard and enjoyed in Israel, but in the United States as well. It is a commonly used melody for the hymn "Adon Olam."
