= Alhambra Cinema =

Art Deco building used by Church of Scientology

Coordinates: 32°3′6.725″N 34°45′33.862″E

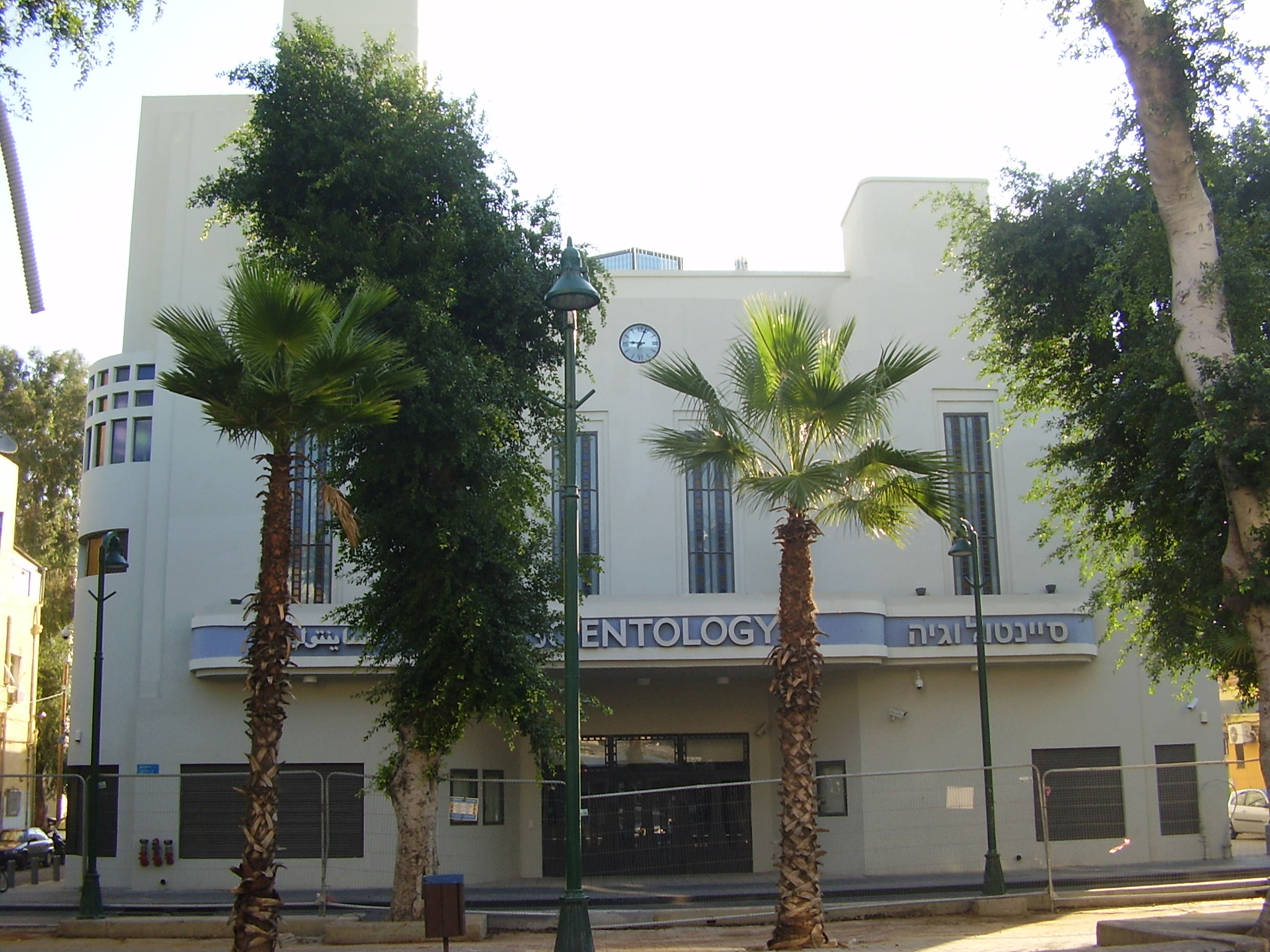

General information
- Architectural style: Art Deco
- Location: Jerusalem Boulevard in Jaffa, Tel Aviv, Israel
- Named for: Alhambra in Spain
- Opened: 1937
- Owner: Scientology International Reserves Trust

Design and construction
- Architect: Ilyas Murr/Elias Al-Mor (1884-1976)

The Alhambra Cinema is a 1937 Art Deco style building on Jerusalem Boulevard in Jaffa, Tel Aviv, Israel, designed by Lebanese architect Elias Al-Mor, and originally built as a cinema. It was named after the Alhambra palace in Spain.

Throughout its history it has been active as a Palestinian cultural institution, again as a cinema after the establishment of Israel, and as a theatre after 1963. In 2010 it was purchased and renovated by the Church of Scientology, and in 2012 was opened under the name Ideal Center of Scientology for the Middle East.

== History ==
The building was opened in May 1937 and was one of the biggest and luxurious cinemas in Palestine. It became a cultural centre and hosted famous Arab artists such as Umm Kulthum, Farid al-Atrash and Leila Mourad. Local residents, both Arabs and Jews, came to the shows together with their families.

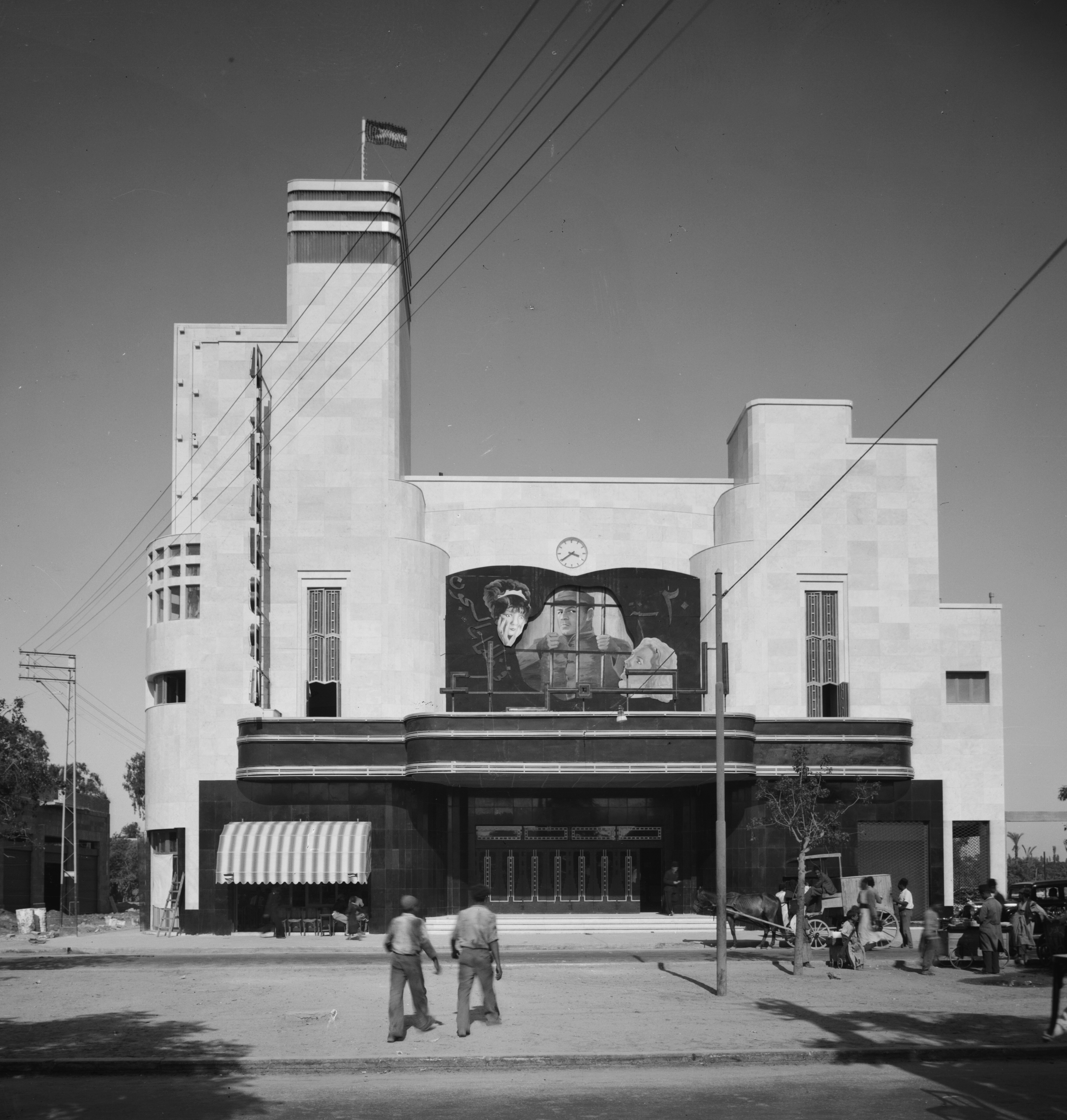
Alhambra Cinema in 1937, with a Palestinian Arab flag on the turret

The cinema was owned and managed by Palestinian Arabs, among them Isa al-Safri, Muhammad Abduh Hilmi, Muhammad Musa al-Husayni, Muhammad Younis al-Husayni, Muhammad Ramadan Hammu, Hasan Arafeh, Abdul-Rahman Alhaj Ibrahim, and Mughnnam Mughnnam. Photos from 1937, during the Arab revolt in Palestine, show light bulbs fitted as a permanent fixture at the top of the building's turret.

After the 1948 Arab–Israeli War it became Israeli property and reopened under the name "Yafor". In 1963 it was taken over by the impresario Giora Godik who turned it into an independent theatre, again under the name "Alhambra". In the late 1970s the building was largely abandoned. Until 2007 a bank used the main entrance, which faces the boulevard, as a branch.

Starting in 2010 the building, affected by decades of transformations, underwent restoration and refurbishment, and in 2012 it was inaugurated as an Israeli and regional centre for Scientology.

== See also ==
- Architecture of Palestine
- Cinema of Palestine
