= Leone de' Sommi =

Italian-Jewish playwright

Leone de' Sommi Portaleone
- Born: c. 1525; Duchy of Mantua
- Died: c. 1590; Mantua
- Occupation: Playwright
- Years active: fl. 1550s

Leone de' Sommi Portaleone (Hebrew: יהודה בן יצחק סומי משער אריה, romanized: Yehuda ben Yitzchak Somi Misha'ar Aryeh, lit. 'Judah son of Isaac Somi Portaleone'; c. 1525 – c. 1590), also known as Leone Ebreo de Somi and Yehuda Sommo, was a Jewish-Italian playwright, director, actor, poet, translator, and treatiser.

He lived most of his life in the northern Italian city of Mantua, until his death in the late 16th century. He had the fortune to live at Mantua during the apogee of its Renaissance cultural flowering, under the rule of the Gonzaga dynasty. This period was also one of relative peace and well-being for the Jewish community of Mantua, which blossomed from a mere 200 souls in 1500 to a population of 2,000 at the beginning of the 17th century. However, by 1650, a series of catastrophes had cut this number is half, and reduced the remaining Jewish-Mantuan community to poverty.

De' Sommi was known as a skilled writer and a friend of Azariah de Rossi.

He was a member of the renowned Portaleone family, which boasted many famous doctors and scientists. He, however, was the first of his family to garner literary fame, as the author of some 15 plays, most of them written in Italian, as well as poetry, and even a comedy, written in Hebrew, A Comedy of Betrothal (צחות בדיחותא דקידושין) the earliest surviving work of its kind in the Hebrew language. He is now most remembered for having written the first ever treatise on the art of stage direction, which defines a precise methodology of play production, from the selection of a text through its performance. This work, entitled, Four Dialogues on Scenic Representation ("Quattro dialoghi in materia di rappresentazioni sceniche"), takes the form of four conversations, between Veridico, a tailor/playwright/director, who acts as the voice of the author, and two curious gentlemen, Santino and Massimiano, who ask Veridico various questions about the theory and practice of the theater. This work marks a major milestone in the modernization of the theater from the unsophisticated days of the Middle Ages, and it also supplies valuable information on how theatrical spectacles were conceived and performed at this point during the Italian Renaissance.

De' Sommi wrote most of his plays in poetry in the service of the Gonzaga dukes, and eventually became a member of the prestigious Accademia degli Invaghiti, from which Jews were technically barred. He wrote and directed many of the plays which the Jewish community were obliged to perform for the ducal court every year at the Carnival celebrations. Unfortunately, almost all of his works were lost in a fire at the Biblioteca Nazionale di Torino, in which sixteen volumes of manuscripts of his work were destroyed. The only works of de' Sommi which survive to this day are the aforementioned Hebrew comedy, the Four Dialogues, a comedy and a pastoral work written in Italian, and a poem in defense of women, entitled Shield of Women (Hebrew: מגן נשים), which consists of alternate lines in Hebrew and Italian.

His play The Three Sisters, one of his last, was performed in 1598 and funded by the Gonzaga family. The Jewish community was also assessed a tax to fund the play.
