= Kazablan =

Israeli play

Early Israeli poster for Kazablan, featuring image of Yehoram Gaon.

Kazablan (Casablan or Kasablan in its first production; Hebrew: קזבלן) is an early Israeli Hebrew language play, staged first as a 1954 drama followed by a 1964 screen adaptation, later as a 1966 musical comedy, and still later produced as a 1973 musical comedy film. The name Kazablan comes from Casablanca, the birthplace of the main character.

The musical's huge success made "young Jerusalem-born singer" Yehoram Gaon "not only ... an overnight singing star, but also a figure of solidarity and pride for people of Sephardic origin, many of whom were entering a theatre for the first time." Gaon later reprised his role in the film version.

== Plot ==
The story has been called an Israeli adaptation of Romeo and Juliet, and the musical "an Israeli version of West Side Story. The plot involves a man and woman who fall in love across different cultures: here, Kazablan is a Mizrahi Jew from Morocco (hence his nickname) in love with Rachel, an Ashkenazic Jew from Europe. "While the two protagonists share religion, their contrasting cultures and ethnicities fuel community scandal and a bitter family feud."

== 1954 play: drama ==
In 1954, the play Casablan, by playwright Yigal Mossinson (sometimes spelled "Igal Mossinsohn") was performed on stage by the Cameri Theater. "The melodramatic piece was highly successful when first presented, since it gave voice to the feelings of discrimination acquired during the first years of statehood by Moroccans and other new immigrants, many of whom were residents of the temporary camps called ma'abarot." Mossinsohn was awarded the David's Harp Prize for the play.

The play was written as a "detective play," focusing on the accusation that Kazablan was guilty of an attempted murder by stabbing. It is eventually revealed that the actual stabber was an Ashkenazic Jew, but audience members realize how easy it was to assume that Kazablan was guilty, revealing their deep-seated prejudices. While the love interest between Kazablan and Rachel is part of the story, it is depicted as "impossible and hopeless" in the play. According to the Columbia Encyclopedia of Modern Drama, the work was written as a "Zionist play" seeking to show how the rifts between cultures was an obstacle to creating a unified Israeli society.

== 1964 film: drama ==
The play Casablan was the basis for a 1964 black-and-white movie of the same name filmed in Greece, and co-produced as a Greek-Israeli-USA production. Directed by Larry Frisch, it starred Nikos Kourkoulos, Xenia Kalogeropoulou and Lykourgos Kallergis. Mossinsohn was given credit as the playwright, with the screenplay adapted by Alex Maimon.

Frisch, the director, was forced to film the movie in Greece because at that time "the State of Israel was so inhospitable to [its]...subject matter"—which included a serious look at the cultural divide between Sephardic and Ashkenazic Jews. Later, the musical version of the play would address the subject matter in a much less serious and more "whimsical" way, managing "to make the Israeli ethnic divide seem like fun." As Israeli historian Tom Segev put it, "Much like West Side Story, which producer Giora Godik had imported a few years previously, Kazablan obliquely hinted at social distress and, as on Broadway, turned it into an entertaining spectacle that angered no one and, consequently, worried no one." Minister Haim Gvati was impressed: "A dynamic play, very impressive," he wrote in his diary. "No wonder it has been running for several months."

The film was released overseas in January 1964 with a New York City premiere of December 12, 1964.

== 1966 play: musical ==
The 1950s in Israel was a time "typified by the rise of commercial producers of light comedies and of the independent impresario Giora Godik who specialized in lavish production of [Hebrew language productions] international musicals," such as My Fair Lady, The King and I, and Man of La Mancha. After enormous success with his production of Fiddler on the Roof, Godik "was looking for more musical material," but "After having difficulty finding an American or British musical which would arouse as much interest as Fiddler," he decided to stage "an original Israeli musical," and decided on a musical version of the Mossinsohn play, Casablan.

The musical version of that play, starring Yehoram Gaon, opened on December 10, 1966 on Godik's Alhambra Stage in Tel Aviv. The production ran for 620 performances, even continuing during the 1967 Six-Day War. In addition to Gaon, other performers included Ady Etzion, Esther Greenberg, Shlomo Bar-Shavit, and Arie Elias. Directed by Yoel Silberg, the choreographer was Crandal Diehl, arranger/orchestrator was Arthur Harris, and the conductor was Dov Seltzer(Zeltzer). The cast album lists lyrics by Amos Ettinger and Hayim Hefer, book by Yoram Kaniuk, Igal Mossinsohn, and Yoel Silberg.

Israeli theater scholar Yehuda Moraly, head of the Department of Theater Studies at Jerusalem's Hebrew University, noted that West Side Story took the Romeo and Juliet idea, but ended the story "with a glimmer of hope." "Kazablan," he continued, adds an additional level of optimism: "The Israeli musical Kazablan, based in turn on West Side Story, ends even more optimistically with the brit milah (ritual circumcision ceremony) and resolution of the communal conflict.

When the production proved so successful in Israel, there was some early talk about a Broadway version, with Columbia Records and CBS International "expressing some interest in the financing of the Broadway version." According to a 1968 issue of Billboard magazine, Tommy Valando, owner of the Valando Music Firm, had "extended his action into Israel to bolster his music publishing company's writing stable, which he's gearing for the Broadway musical market." The Broadway version of Kazablan was to have been "the first product on Valando's agenda."

=== Musical numbers ===
Musical numbers included in the Original Cast Album released in 1966 (and re-released in 1974 to coincide with the opening of the film) include:

- Overture
- Self-respect
- We are all Jews
- Magic slippers
- Democracy
- Anything happen?
- There's a place
- Jaffa
- Gossip
- I'm so frightened
- Municipality
- Get off my back, Kazablan
- Lullaby
- Brit Mila pageant

== 1973 film: musical ==
The film was directed by Menahem Golan, who co-wrote the screenplay with Haim Hefer, and starred Yehoram Gaon as Kazablan and Efrat Lavi as Rachel. It was shot in Jerusalem and Jaffa. The movie was filmed in both a Hebrew and English version, and according to press releases, each scene was first filmed in one language and then the other.

Although it was a screen version of an earlier play, the movie has sometimes been cited as an example of the Bourekas film genre in Israel, a "peculiarly Israeli genre of comic melodramas or tearjerkers... based on ethnic stereotypes." The term is said to have been coined by the Israeli film director Boaz Davidson, the creator of several such films, as a play on words on the "Spaghetti Western" genre, as spaghetti (a reference to the fact that these films were produced in Italy) was a type of food and Bourekas is an Israeli food, or at least a food that is now part of Israeli cuisine, brought in by immigrants from other countries. Bourekas is also puffy and airy, implying that a film of this genre has little if any serious content.

A DVD of the film was released on May 6, 2008.

=== Musical numbers ===
- I'm so frightened ("Ani Kol Kach Pochedet"): Lyrics by Haim Hefer, music by Dov Seltzer, performed by Adi Etzion
- Democracy ("Democratia"): Lyrics by Amos Ettinger, music by Dov Seltzer, performed by Yehoram Gaon
- There is a place ("Yesh Makom"): Lyrics by Amos Ettinger, music by Dov Seltzer, performed by Yehoram Gaon
- Jaffa ("Yafo"): Lyrics by Amos Ettinger, music by Dov Seltzer, performed by Aliza Azikri
- We are all Jews ("Kulanu Yehudim"): Lyrics by Haim Hefer, music by Dov Seltzer, performed by Kazablan
- Self-respect ("Kol Ha-Kavod"): Lyrics by Dan Almagor, music by Dov Seltzer, performed by Yehoram Gaon
- What happened? ("Ma Kara?"): Lyrics by Haim Hefer, music by Dov Seltzer, performed by Yehoram Gaon
- Brit milah [circumcision] pageant ("Mizmorey Brit Mila"): Lyrics by Haim Hefer, music by Dov Seltzer, performed by Yehoram Gaon
- Rosa ("Roza"): Lyrics by Haim Hefer, music by Dov Seltzer, performed by Yehoram Gaon
- Get off my back, Kazablan ("Tered Mimeni, Kazablan"): Lyrics by Dan Almagor, music by Dov Seltzer, performed by Yehoram Gaon

=== Response and reviews ===
The film earned two 1974 Golden Globe nominations (Hollywood Foreign Press Association), one for Best Foreign Language Film and one for Best Song.

Well received by audiences, one website describes it in this way: "West Side Story with a Middle Eastern beat, this fun fantasy features more than 1,000 actors, singers and dancers!" and "Israel's hit musical becomes the film that breaks all box office records!" One review noted that the movie and the recording outsold both Fiddler on the Roof and The Sound of Music in Israel. Additionally, Yehoram Gaon's recording of "Kol HaKavod" became the best-selling record up till that time in Israel's history.

However, although it was positively received by the public (and continues to be shown as part of Jewish film festivals), and despite its two Golden Globe nominations, not all professional reviews were good. TimeOutChicago described it as "An Israeli musical directed by the dreaded Menahem Golan that manages to come off as an uncomfortable cross between Jesus Christ Superstar, Fiddler on the Roof and West Side Story. Judith Crist, in her review for New York Magazine, stated that "You don't have to be Jewish to dislike Kazablan, but it helps. At best, it portrays Jews as stereotypes and clowns."
