= Arieh Elias =

Israeli actor (1921–2015)

- אריה אליאס
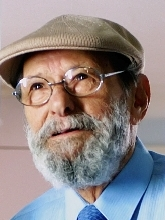
- Elias in Bonjour Monsieur Shlomi (2003)
- Born: 1 April 1921; Baghdad, Iraq
- Died: 7 May 2015 (aged 94); Tel HaShomer, Israel
- Occupation: Actor
- Years active: 1954–2006

Arieh Elias (Hebrew: אריה אליאס; 1 April 1921 – 7 May 2015) was an Israeli actor.

== Biography ==
Arieh Elias was born in Baghdad. In 1941, he was the first Jew to be accepted to the drama faculty of Baghdad's Academy of Fine Arts. Elias immigrated to Mandatory Palestine in 1947. He joined the Palmach and fought in the War of Independence. At first he had trouble finding work as an actor due to his pronounced Arabic accent, but his popularity grew after playing the lead in the Israeli film HaYeled Me'ever LaRechov (The Boy Across The Street) in 1965.

== Acting and film career ==
In the early 1960s, he directed the theater troupe of the Frank Sinatra Center in Nazareth, staging Jean d'Arc, Nasser Aladdin and Majnun Night for El-Hadit Theater.

Elias appeared in more than thirty films from 1954 to 2006. In 2013, he received the Lifetime Achievement Award from the Israeli Artists' Association.

== Filmography ==
Year	Title	Role	Notes
1955	Even Al Kol Meel		
1965	The Boy Across the Street	David's father	
1967	999 Aliza Mizrahi	Aharon Mizrahi	
1968	Ha-Gamal V'Hayeled		
1969	Margo Sheli		
1969	Lifnei Maher		
1971	The Policeman	Albert	
1971	Ariana		
1972	The Jerusalem File	Informer	
1972	Nurit		
1973	Kazablan	Moshiko	
1974	Charlie Ve'hetzi	Zaki Ben Hananiah	
1974	Sarit		
1975	Hagiga B'Snuker	Halfon	
1976	Street 60		
1977	Hershele	Hamama	
1977	Badranit Ba'hatzot	Chacham Mashiah	
1978	Madma	Mizrahi	
1980	Kohav Hashahar	Elias	
1982	Dead End Street		
1983	Nurit II		
1984	Kasach	Hofni's father	
1987	Ha-Muvtal Batito		
1988	Mis'chakim Ba'Horef		
1989	Abba Ganuv II	Nisim, 'The Doctor'	
1989	Esh Tzolevet	Mr. Shlush	
1989	Tzamot		
1993	The Seventh Coin	Fouad Zouabi	
1995	Layla Lavan	The Grandfather	
1996	Nashim		
1999	Shkarim Levanim		
2000	Tzaadim Noashim		
2001	The Body	Hamid's Father	
2003	Bonjour Monsieur Shlomi	Grandfather Bar Dayan	
2003	James' Journey to Jerusalem	Salah	

== See also ==
- Theater of Israel
- Cinema of Israel
- History of the Jews in Iraq
