= Europa Philharmonie =

- Orchestra
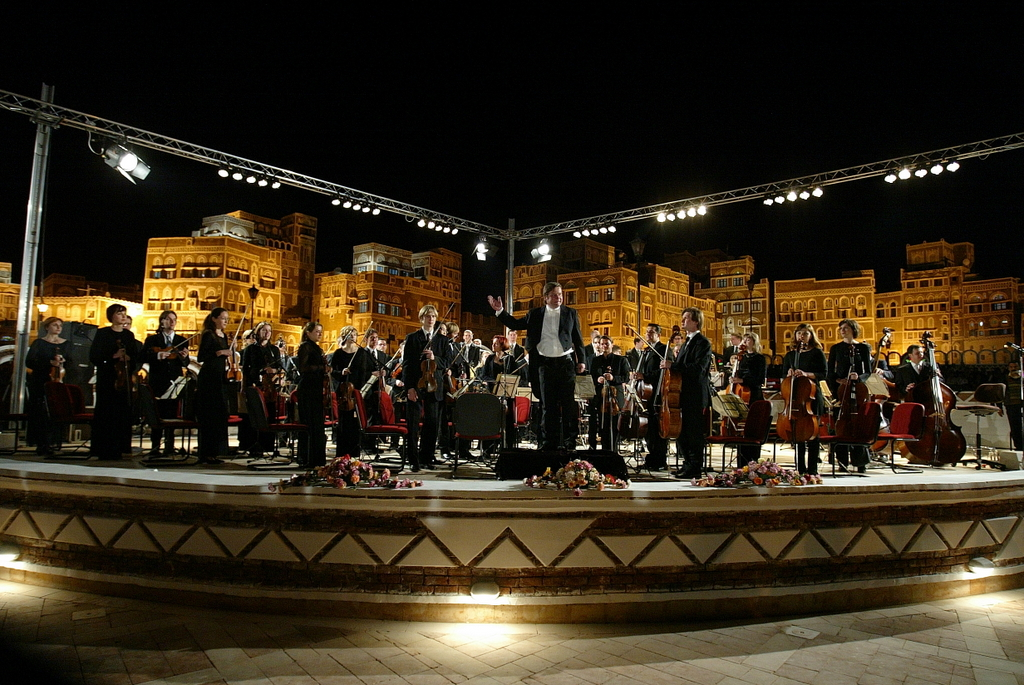
- Founded: 1996
- Location: Baden-Württemberg, Germany
- Principal conductor: Reinhard Seehafer
- Website: www.europaphilharmonie.com

The Europa Philharmonie is a European symphony orchestra made up of musicians from European Union countries as well as musicians from all over the world who have made Europe their home. Since 2009, the orchestra has been based in Baden-Württemberg, Germany, and is supported by the association Friends of Europa Philharmonie. The founder and principal conductor is Reinhard Seehafer.

== History ==
The idea for a European orchestra came from general director Professor Wolf-Dieter Ludwig and the principal conductor, Reinhard Seehafer, after the borders in Europe had fallen away, and later under the name of Europa Philharmonie, was substantiated through the work with the artistic director Ferry Tomaszyk at worldwide guest performances as ambassadors of the Federal Republic of Germany. The orchestra's debut took place in 1996 with live television coverage across Europe with 3sat, performing Gustav Mahler's "Resurrection" in St. Peters's Church, Görlitz under the direction of principal conductor Reinhard Seehafer, with cooperation from the foundation Kreisau/Krzyzowa.

Europa Philharmonie stands for a tolerant and unified Europe, which is a view also reflected in the patronage of the German and Polish state presidents, and the president of the German Federal Parliament, as well as the work of the board of trustees "Indivisible Europe" of which Professor Kurt Masur, the late Lea Rabin, Hans-Dietrich Genscher and Prof. Dr. Dieter Stolte are members.

From 1998 to 2007, the orchestra was based in Schloss Hundisburg (Hundisburg Castle) in Saxony-Anhalt, which is one of the most important baroque castles in northern Germany.

== Worldwide Concert Activity ==
- In honour of the 30th anniversary of the diplomatic relationship between the Federal Republic of Germany and the People's Republic of China in 2002, Europa Philharmonie gave guest performances in Shanghai, Beijing and five other cities in China.
- In 2004, the orchestra was the first classical symphony orchestra in the world to perform in Sana'a, the capital city of Yemen, at the opening concert for "Sana'a - Cultural Capital of the Arab World", which was attended by its patron, the former President of the Bundestag, Wolfgang Thierse, and the Yemen Minister for Culture and Tourism, Khalid Al-Rewaishan. In addition to the invited guests, an audience of 5.000 experienced this spectacular concert with the city of Sana'a as a backdrop. The concert was also televised across the entire Arabian world. This tour also took the orchestra to Abu-Dhabi, Ajman and Oman, where the orchestra performed traditional New Year's concerts.
- Gala Concert "Welcome to Europe" in 2004, televised live, in the capital city of Cyprus, Nicosia, in honour of Cyprus' upcoming entry into the EU.
- In 2005, the orchestra undertook a concert tour as ambassadors for the Federal Republic of Germany in honour of the 60th anniversary of the end of the 2nd world war from Kefalonia to Athens and Crete, all places where massacres took place.
- "Christmas Gala" 2005 in Antalya, Turkey, where the orchestra was awarded a prize for their work in intercultural understanding.

== Current projects ==
- Education and Music for apprentice under the patronage of Prof. Dr. Claus Hipp
- Europe needs young people for school students in Germany, Switzerland and France
- Cultural Sustainability for Future Generations with projects to do with climate change and the protection of the environment
