= Ran Eliran =

Israeli singer

- רן אלירן
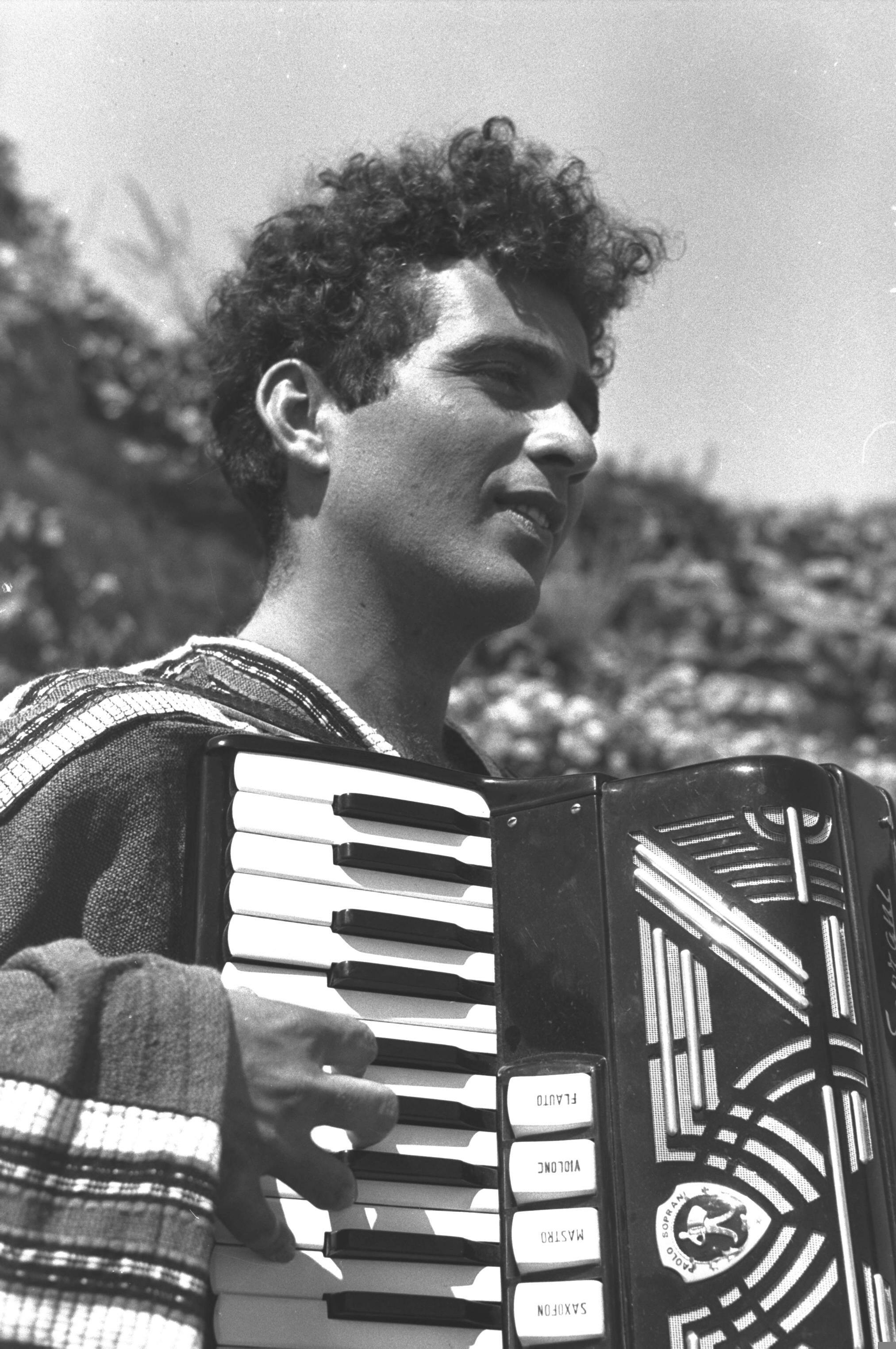
- Ran Eliran accordionist of the student folk dancing group in Jerusalem
- Born: December 16, 1934 (age 91)
- Occupation: Israeli singer
- Awards: 1998 Israel Prize

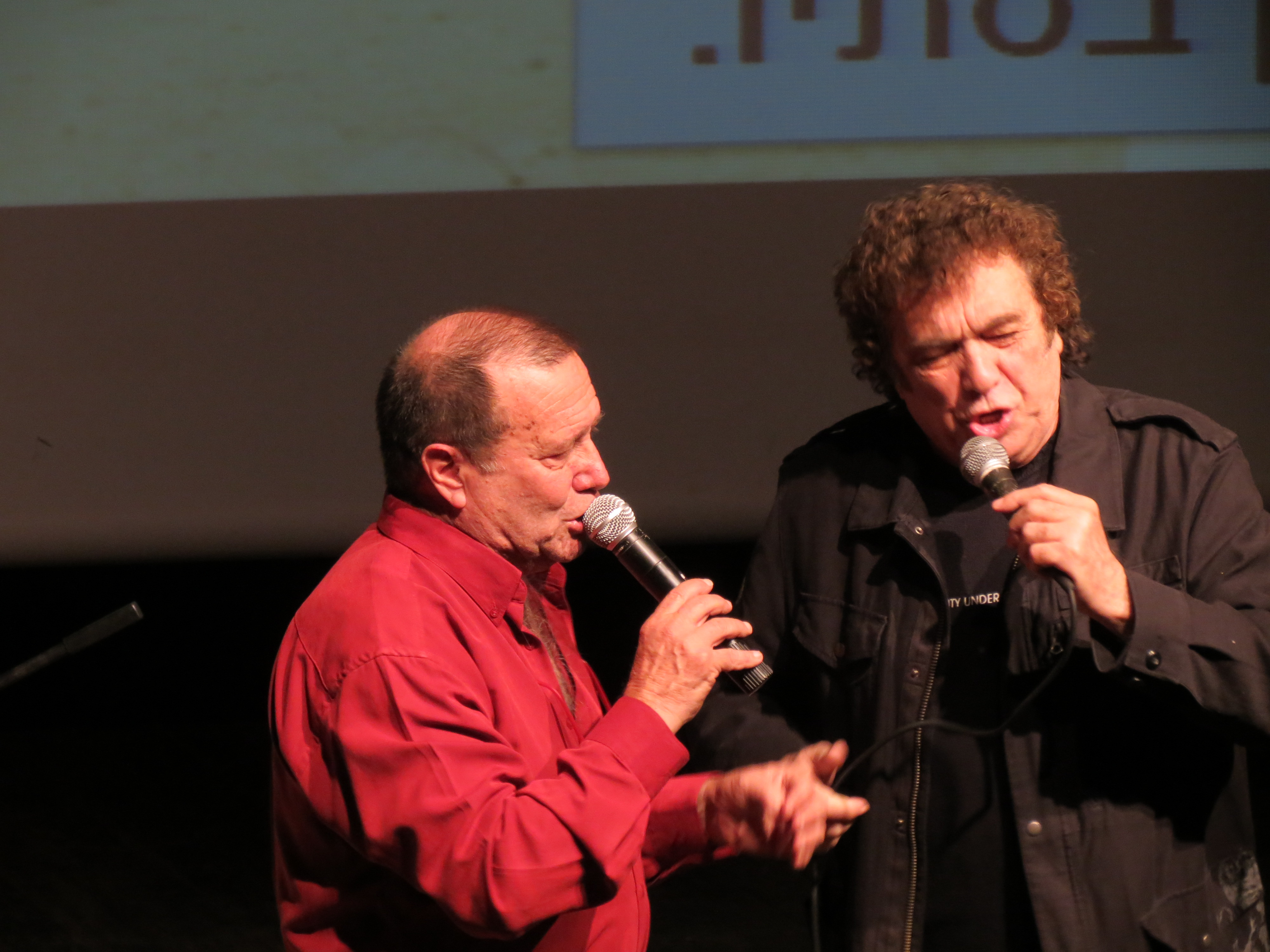
Ran Eliran (right) with Gabi Berlin

Ran Eliran (Hebrew: רן אלירן; born December 16, 1934), known as "Israel's Ambassador of Song," is an Israeli singer.

== Biography ==
Ran Eliran (Menachem Leizerovich) was born in Haifa, British Mandate of Palestine. He was the middle child among three siblings. His Polish-Jewish parents ran a bakery. In the late 1950s, he formed one of the first Israeli folk-style duos, Ran and Nama with Nechama Hendel. In 1958, Ed Sullivan visited Israel looking for young performers to appear on a special show celebrating Israel's tenth anniversary. Eliran and Hendel were the finalists. While the name Ran was not a problem for English speakers, they could not pronounce Nechama, so the duo became known as "Ran and Nama." After their television appearance, the duo toured the United States for a year and a half. Eliran was the first Israeli singer to perform in Las Vegas.

In 1962, Eliran became an entertainer for the Israel Defense Forces. One of his greatest hits was the Sharm el-Sheikh song, composed after the Six-Day War. In the mid-1970s he appeared in a Broadway musical, "Don't Step on My Olive Branch" with Israeli performers Rivka Raz, Ruthi Navon, Riki Gal and Hanan Goldblatt.

With Nama and solo, Eliran has an extensive discography behind him, as well as a distinguished history of performances, playing with Woody Allen, Bob Dylan, Pete Seeger, and Elvis Presley. He was recently given the Israeli Lifetime Achievement Award.

Eliran studied film and photography at New York University and continues to live in New York.
