= Yehuda Moraly =

Yehuda (Jean-Bernard) Moraly
- יהודה מורלי
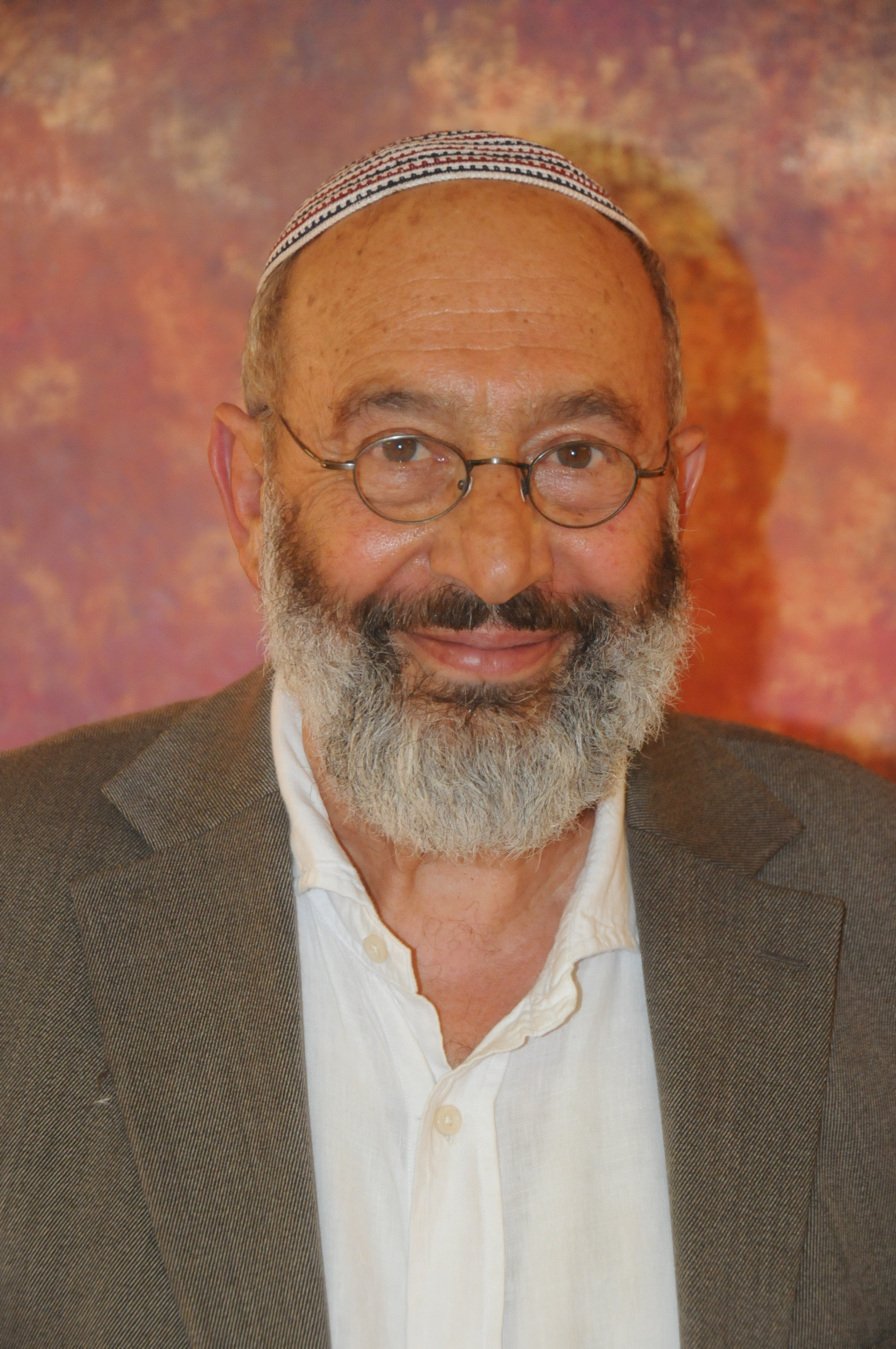
- Born: 1948 (age 77–78); Algiers, French Algeria
- Occupations: Researcher, professor, playwright, director, actor.
- Website: https://yehudamoraly.huji.ac.il

Yehuda (Jean-Bernard) Moraly (Hebrew: יהודה מורלי), a theater researcher, playwright, director and actor, is a professor emeritus of Theater studies at the Hebrew University. His fields of research are mainly French theater and film. He taught theater at the Sorbonne, the Federal University of Rio de Janeiro, Bar Ilan University and the Hebrew University (1982-2012). Moraly organized numerous symposiums and an annual Student Theater Festival at the Department of Theater Studies of the Hebrew University.

== Research ==
In his research, Moraly undermines generally admitted cultural images.

His recent research is devoted to the representations of Jewish characters in Occupied France's Theater and Film in works such as Les Enfants du Paradis, Volpone, La Folle de Chaillot. This analysis appeared in Revolution in Paradise: Veiled representations of Jewish characters in Occupied France, Sussex Academic Press, 2020. The purpose of the book is to show that, contrary to the accepted view, some of these films and plays were intimately linked to the political situation. They convey the demonization of characters that, while not specifically presented as Jews nevertheless manifested anti-Semitic stereotypes of the Jew as ugly, rootless, low, hypocritical, immoral, cruel and power hungry. All movies analyzed (Les Inconnus dans la maison; Les Visiteurs du Soir; L’Eternel retour; Les Enfants du Paradis) present characters not identified as Jews but who exhibit negative “Jewish” traits, in contrast to the aristocratic characters whom they aspire to emulate. They demonstrate, implicitly, central themes of explicit anti-Semitic propaganda.

=== Jean Genet ===
His first book: Jean Genet, la vie écrite (La Difference, 1988) opposed Genet's official image (as an uncultured outlaw) and showed Jean Genet to be a highly cultured writer whose need to write determined all the aspects of his life. The book became a point of reference for research on Genet's work. Le Maître fou (Nizet, 2009) analyzes Genet's theoretical texts on theater and art. These texts, neglected by scholarship, offer a key for the comprehension of Genet's dramatic work and are a deep reflection about the powers and the limits of artistic creation. In this book, Moraly focuses on Genet's texts both on theater and more broadly, on aesthetics. From his study of Cocteau to his essay "That Strange Word..." (1967) and including writings on his various plays and also on Léonor Fini, Rembrandt, Giacometti, and "The Tightrope Walker", texts in which, Moraly states, Genet analyzes his own views on the creation, function, and power of art.

=== Paul Claudel ===
The second theme of his research, the theatrical creation of Paul Claudel, is not so far from the first as it may seem. In Claudel metteur en scène: la frontière entre les deux mondes (Presses Universitaires de Franche Comté, 1998), Moraly opposes the accepted image of Claudel as a paragon of arrière-garde theater. The book reveals unknown aspects of Claudel's work: his ballets, his theatrical experiments and his exploration of a new kind of musical theater. In his recent book Dream Projects: in Novels, Theater and Films Sussex Academic Press, 2021, Moraly continues to deal with the work of Claudel and Genet. Also, he refers to the cinematic works of Federico Fellini. The purpose of this book is to illustrate how an author’s thwarted dream project – which, being unpublished or un-produced, can only be retrospectively reconstituted through archived notes and drafts – serves as a key for reading the author’s entire corpus. In the present study, Moraly has used the work drafts of these three influential artists of the twentieth century – Paul Claudel, Jean Genet, and Federico Fellini – to better understand their respective oeuvres.

== Playwright ==
Moraly is also a playwright. His plays have been produced and published in France and in other countries: Les Catcheuses, Sissi en enfer; Cendrillon; Gimpel; Le Tombeau des poupées; Strip; Etrangle-moi, mon amour;The Barcelona Dispute; La Musique; Voices; Les merveilles du fond des mers ou un chef d'œuvre à gonfler soi-même. His last play, Le Grand Tombeau des Beaux-Arts was published in Editions Orizons in 2020 In 2021, Moraly produced a series of short monologues in Hebrew and French, Last Words, based on the text of his last play Le Grand Tombeau des Beaux-Arts. The series was displayed in a virtual theater format due to the global pandemic.

== List of publications ==
=== Books ===
Genet, La vie écrite (in French), Pp. 355. Paris: Editions de la Différence, 1988.

Les negres au port de la lune (in French), [ed.] Pp. 286. Paris: Editions de la Difference, 1988.

Claudel metteur en scène, la frontière entre les deux mondes (in French), Pp. 364. Besançon: Presses universitaires franc-comtoises, 1998.

Le Maître fou (in French), Pp. 185 . Saint-Genouph: Librairie Nizet, 2009.

L'oeuvre impossible: Claudel, Genet, Fellini (in French) Pp. 208. Paris: Editions le Manuscrit, 2013.

Revolution in Paradise: veiled representations of Jewish Characters in the cinema of occupied France, Pp. 276. Brighton: Sussex Academic Press, 2020.

Dream Projects in Novels, Theatre and Film: Claudel, Genet, Fellini, Pp. 196. Brighton: Sussex Academic Press, 2021.

=== Plays ===
Les Catcheuses (in French), Paris: Editions de Babel, 1973.

Sissi en enfer (Collection Nouveau théâtre, in French), Rennes: Maison de la Culture de Rennes, 1975.

Tombeaux de poupées (in French), Paris: Palais de Chaillot, 1983.

Strip (in French), Paris: Avant-Scène, 1986.

Les merveilles du fond des mers ou un chef d'œuvre à gonfler soi-même (in French), Tel-Aviv: Continuum, 2009.

Le Grand Tombeau des Beaux-Arts (in French), Paris: Orizons, 2020.

== Other sources ==
- Revolution in Paradise on YouTube
- L'oeuvre impossible;Claudel, Genet, Fellini on YouTube
- Gimpel the Fool (Khan Theatre Jerusalem) on YouTube
- Voices on YouTube
- Beauty and the Beast Part 1 on YouTube Part 2 on YouTube
- Continuum Issue about Yehuda Moraly
- Personal Page on Academia.com
- Book Review: Revolution in Paradise - Jerusalem Post
- Book Review: Revolution in Paradise - Segula
- reviews in french
