= Giora Godik =

Theater producer and impresario

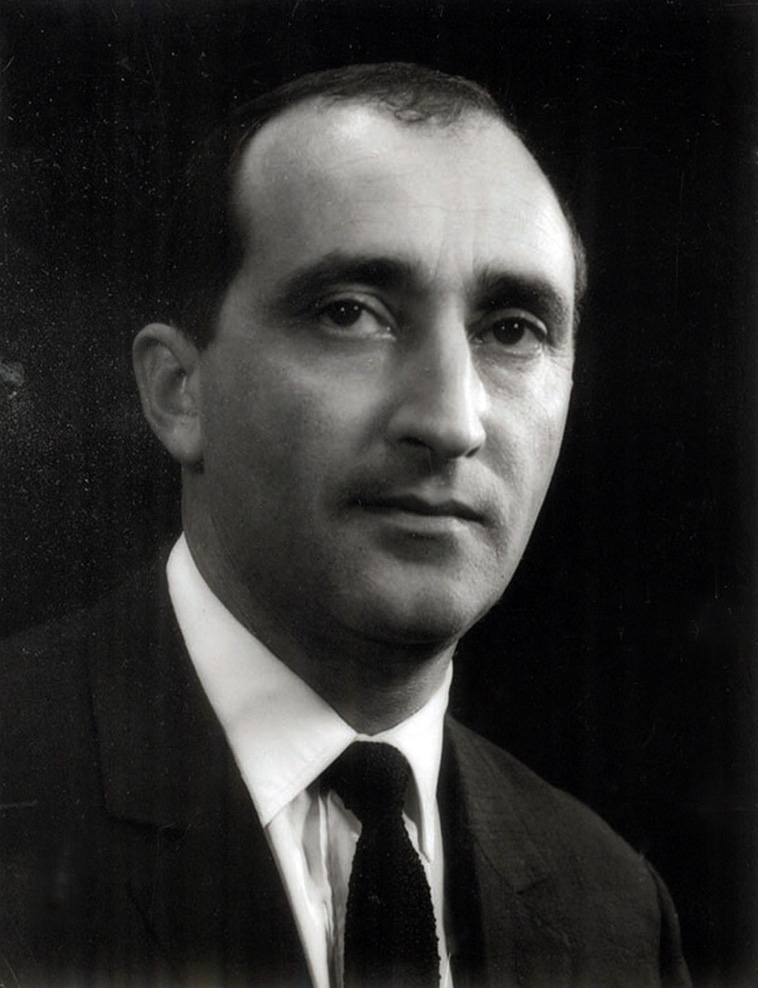
Giora Godik

Giora Godik (Hebrew: גיורא גודיק; 1921–1977) was a Polish-born Jewish Israeli theater producer and impresario, famous for bringing musical comedies to Israel. Called the "King of musicals," the 2007 film documentary, "Waiting for Godik", tells the story of his rise and fall from one of the most "legendary" theater figures in Israel—someone who "endeavored...to bring the American dream to Tel Aviv", to someone destitute, who hit bottom. He "skyrocketed to the top and plummeted to the lowest depths."

== Success ==
=== Musical producer ===
Godik entered Israeli show business in the mid-1950s as an impresario specializing in the import of foreign entertainers. Among the individual performers brought to Israel was Marlene Dietrich, who told Meyer Weisgal in 1960 that she would like to him to arrange a visit for her to Israel and perform there simply for the cost of her transportation. Weisgal relates that he chose Godik, who was so happy with the idea that he immediately flew to Paris to make the arrangements. Her performance was an outstanding success, with fourteen curtain calls. At the end, she said to the audience, "We have suffered, you and I, during those terrible years [of the Holocaust]. If there is any consolation or comfort for the incalculable suffering of your people and my people, your warmth and affection has restored in me my faith in humanity. I love you dearly."

In 1963, he purchased the Alhambra Cinema in Jaffa, an Absentee Property (a property of a Palestinian, expropriated after the Nakba). Giora Godik later specialized in "lavish production of international musicals," produced for the Israeli stage. His productions included Hebrew-language versions of musicals including My Fair Lady,(1964), The King and I, Man of La Mancha, and Fiddler on the Roof.

The Hebrew version of Fiddler on the Roof was so successful that Godik decided to produce a second version, this time in Yiddish, the language in which the original Shalom Aleichem stories upon which the musical was based were written. With this Yiddish production, based on the translation of Shraga Friedman, "Tevye had come full circle and returned to his mameloshn ("mother-tongue")."

The productions mounted by Godik made such an impression of Israeli theater goers that the newspaper Ha’aretz credited Godik as "being a primary force in Israel’s emulation of American culture".

After enormous success with his production of Fiddler on the Roof, Godik "was looking for more musical material," but "After having difficulty finding an American or British musical which would arouse as much interest as Fiddler", he decided to stage "an original Israeli musical," and decided on a musical version of the Mossinsohn play, Casablan. That musical, Kazablan, was a tremendous success, with a huge impact in Israel. The musical's huge success made "young Jerusalem-born singer" Yehoram Gaon "not only...an overnight singing star, but also a figure of solidarity and pride for people of Sephardic origin, many of whom were entering a theatre for the first time." Gaon later reprised his role in the film version.

=== Godik Theater ===
Godik founded the "Godik Theater," first to bring singers and performers from outside Israel to produce foreign-made musical plays, and then to work with original productions. "At its peak," the enterprise managed by Godik "had about 200 employees, and paid very high salaries to dozens of actors, singers, musicians, directors, and dancers."

== Controversy ==
Beatles historian Yoav Kutner states that a dispute between Godik and music promoter Yaakov Uri was responsible for the cancellation of a planned visit by the Beatles in 1965. Although the claim is sometimes made that the blame for the failed opportunity lies with Israeli authorities who refused to admit the singing group out of fear that they would "corrupt the youth" of Israel, Kutner notes that Godik simply preferred to bring singer Cliff Richard, who was then the more famous star. "When Uri bought the rights to hold the concert two years later, Godik was angry that he blew the opportunity and went to the Knesset’s Finance Committee to persuade them to bar the promoters from taking out foreign currency." Because at that time, expenditures of large amounts of foreign currency in Israel required government approval, Godik's pressure on the government made the visit and concert impossible.

According to stories that were published in Israel in conjunction with the premiere of "Waiting for Godik," the producer "never forgave himself for the blunder of his life and decided that no one would benefit from what he had missed: It was a case of either me or no one."

== Collapse ==
Godik was a legend during his heyday, but his empire collapsed in the early 1970s, bringing an end to the period when musicals seemed to rule Israeli theater. Although after Godik's successes and eventual collapse, "occasionally the major theaters and some independent producers continued to produce international musical hits such as Cabaret and Les Misérables, "musicals were never again considered the forte of the Israeli stage."

The time following the 1967 Six-Day War was a time of "stock-market mania and the desire for instant profits," and it was this mania that "infected Godik as well." It led him to make "a series of disastrous decisions," including failed attempts to stage musical's including "The Witch" and Neil Simon's "Promises, Promises", causing him to fall into debt. "One morning all of Israel - and especially the 200 employees of Godik's theatre - were shocked to hear that the noted producer had fled the country during the night. The theatre closed down at once."

Godik fled to Germany. "Utterly destitute, he sold hot-dogs for a living, at the central railway station in Frankfurt. He believed he would soon resume his position as King of Musicals. But Godik stayed far away from the theater, never to return."

According to the documentary that recorded both his rise and fall, this "tragic story of the man, who touched the dream and crashed, is also the story of an unforgettable era and the tale of the local version of the musical genre."

== See also ==
- Alhambra Cinema, a former cinema from Jaffa taken over by Godik in 1963 and transformed by him into a theater
