= List of Israeli films of the 1980s =

A list of films produced in Israel in the 1980s.

== Overview ==
During the 1980s, the amount of audience going to see Israeli films significantly decreased. In addition to that, the government budget which was given to the film industry was very small - which made it very difficult to produce new quality films.

Among the most prominent films of this period: Beyond the Walls (Uri Barbash), Summer of Aviya (Gila Almagor), Avanti Popolo (Rafi Bukai), Late Summer Blues (Renen Schorr), Noa at 17 (Itzhak Zepel Yeshurun), Hamsin (Danny Waxman), Shtei Etzbaot Mi'Tzidon (Eli Cohen) and Burning Land (Serge Ankri).
