= Dedi Baron =

Israeli theatre opera director

Dedi Baron (Hebrew: דדי ברון; born on July 17, 1954) is an Israeli theatre and opera director who works and creates in Israel, Germany, Australia and teaches directing and acting.

== Biography ==
Dedi Baron is a graduate of the Tel-Aviv University, where she majored in theater arts (1998) and the higher education school of plastic arts in Zurich, Switzerland. She has completed a continuing education program on full scholarship in the "Royal Court" theatre in London (1997) and was sent by the Goethe Institute to a four-month continuing education program on top theatres on Berlin and Hamburg (2003). Baron is in a domestic partnership with the playwright and screenwriter Shlomi Moskovitz and is a mother of four daughters. The two have one daughter together – Omer Moskovitz, who is a songwriter and a singer, as well as three daughters from her previous marriage to Alexander Blankstein: Michal Bernshtein – theatre, film and television actress, creator and lecturer, Tal Blankstein – actress, creator and Iyengar Yoga instructor, and Dana Blankstein-Cohen, film and television director, who is the manager of the Sam Spiegel and Television School.

== Theater, film and television directing career ==
Baron has directed dozens of plays in Israel and around the world. Since 1999 she has directed in all the repertory theatres in Tel-Aviv (Cameri Theater, Habima, Beit Lessin), and since 2006 – also in top theatres in Germany, Austria and also in the German Opera. Since 2007 she has worked as a directing lecturer on the theatre department in Tel-Aviv University in MA program; Baron is also a coach for final productions.

=== Israel ===
Play	Writing	Theatre
"Week"	Shlomi Moskovitz	HaBima
Vagina Monologues	Eve Ensler (translation: Shlomi Moskovitz)	HaBima
"Retreat from Moscow: a Tale of Fragile Relationship"	William Nicholson (translation: Shlomi Moskovitz)	HaBima
"A Star Will Shine"	Shlomi Moskovitz	HaBima
"Period of Adjustment"	Tennessee Williams	HaBima
"They Shoot Horses, Don't They"?	Horace McCoy (Adapted by Shlomi Moskovitz	Cameri Theater
"Tera"	Zeruya Shalev (Stage adaptation: Pnina Gary and Dorit Gary)	Cameri Theater
"Good Night, Mother"	Marsha Norman (Translation: Rivkah Mesholah)	Cameri Theater
"This is the Great Sea"	Yosef Bar-Yosef	Cameri Theater
"Simply to Love"	Shlomi Moskovitz	Cameri Theater
"Not on the Way Home"	Monodrama by Motti Lerner for the memory of the late Edna Fliedel	HaYovel Theater, Cameri Theater
"Dolphins"	Maya Shaya	Beit Lessin Theater
"Uncle Vanya"	Anton Chekhov (Translation: Shlomi Moskovitz	HaSimta
"Tick-Tock Time Flies"	Dedi Baron	HaSimta in cooperation with Youth Theater
"Motorcycle Trip"	Shlomi Moskovitz	HaSimta in cooperation with Youth Theater
"Adi's Jewelry"	Nava Macmel-Atir	Orna Porat Children's Theater
"Exodus"	Tsviya Huberman	Orna Porat Children's Theater
"Integral Part"	Shlomi Moskovitz and Gil Kopatch	Yoram Lewinstein's Acting Studio with ZOA House
"King Lear"	William Shakespeare	Yoram Lewinstein's Acting Studio
"Luna"	Dedi Baron	Yoram Lewinstein's Acting Studio
"Take Me, Maurice"	Tsvika Schwartsberg and Orly Yeshua	Commercial Theater – Menakhem Asher Productions
"Wiped" (Theme of the Play: Drugs)	Orly Yeshua	Samy Levi Youth Theater
"A Lie of the Mined"	Sam Shepard	Theatre Studies – "Alon" School in Ramat Ha-SHaron

=== Europe ===
Play	Writing	Theatre
"Romeo and Juliet"	William Shakespeare	Kiel Town Theater, Germany
Liebelei	Arthur Schnitzler	Kiel Town Theater, Germany
"Ten Commandments"	Shlomi Moskovitz	Kiel Town Theater, Germany
"Hedda Gabler"	Henrik Ibsen	Kiel Town Theater, Germany
"The House of Bernarda Alba"	Federico Garcia Lorca	Kiel Town Theater, Germany
"The Lemon Tree"	Eran Riklis, Suha Araf	Düsseldorf Town Theater
"Murder"	Hanoch Levin	Düsseldorf Town Theater
"Falling Out of Time"	David Grossman	Krefeld-Hohenbudberg Town Theater, Germany
"Tartuffe"	Molière	Krefeld-Hohenbudberg Town Theater, Germany
"Three Sisters"	Anton Chekhov	Krefeld-Hohenbudberg Town Theater, Germany
"IandI"	Else Lasker-Schüler	Wuppertal Town Theater, Germany (in cooperation with Pina Bausch Dance Group
"Terror"	Ferdinand von Schirach	Salzburg National Theater, Austria

=== Director of Special Projects ===
- Post-trauma/Reality check – a collection of seven short plays, collaborative project of HaBima Theater and Düsseldorf Town Theater. Featuring the director Tal Brenner. Writers: Dana Idisys, Yariv Gottlieb, Noa Lazar Kinan, Tal Schieff, Johan Brick, Nora Mansman and Thomas Mela.
- Native tongue – Mameloshn – online audio-drama in collaboration with Gesher Theater and Goethe Institute in Israel. By Sasha (Marianna) Zaltsman. Starring: Rivka Michaeli, Neta Shpigelman, Neta Roth

.

=== TV Director ===
- "Shut-up Show" – a comic show starring Nathan Datner, Anat Waxman and Rama Messinger, HOT3, first and second season.
- "The Bet"- short drama starring Moshe Ivgy and Yasmin Kedar.
- Editorial member in "Culture Daily" show with Yael Dan.

=== Opera Director ===
- "Don Giovanni" by Mozart, Israeli Opera.
- "Die Entführung aus dem Serail" by Mozart, Kiel Opera.
- Directing children and youth concerts and operas in collaboration with the conductor Ronnie Porat in the Israel Philharmonic Orchestra in the "HaBama" Holon Orchestra and Rishon LeZion Town Orchestra.

== Academic and pedagogic career ==
- Staff lecturer in the faculty of theater in Tel-Aviv University and productions instructor in preparation for master's degree.
- Acting and directing lecturer in Western Galilee College.
- Directing guest lecturer in "Mozarteum" and founder of Collaborations project with Tel-Aviv University.
- Acting teacher in Yoram Lewinstein's Acting Studio.
- Acting teacher in arts class of "Alon" Highschool in Ramat Ha-Sharon.

== Festival judging ==
- Judge in the "Thespis" festival for mono-dramas, Kiel, Germany.
- Judge in Theatronetto – mono-dramas festival.
- A member of artistic committees of the Haifa Children Theater Festival and of "HaBama" workshops.

== Awards and recognition ==
- Ora Goldenberg's award for directing, given for directing the play "A Week", on Habima theatre, 2004.
- Joseph Milo's award for director of the year, for directing the play "This is the Great Sea" in the Cameri Theater.
- The play "A Week" was invited to the "Méditerranée" festival in Milan, Italy.
- In 2007 Dedi Baron was invited to participate in the "largest round table in the world" on Babelplatz in Berlin, alongside 112 of the "people that have the most positive affect on the world", including: Wim Wenders, Laurie Anderson, Terry Gilliam, Willem Dafoe, Bianca Jagger and others.

== Creative process ==
In her interviews, Baron has told about the differences her work in Israel vs. in Germany. For example, in an interview for "Time Out Tel-Aviv she stated the following: “In Germany I am working while my only concern is dealing with the creation and not taking the audience into account, without any artistic compromise. I mostly work on classic materials such as ‘Hedda Gabler’ and ‘Romeo and Juliet’ and this is a process of studying, searching, evolving. There is a lot of frustration on my part because of the gap between working there, with a sense of peace, and working in Israel. Germany is a place where the theater enables you to dream and is at your service, fulfilling these dreams. In Israel I dream differently. Here (In Israel) I am ‘Dedi with limitations’, who is not as good as ’Dedi without limitations’, and this upsets me, I admit. Perhaps that is because I do reach artistic satisfaction twice a year over there (In Germany), so I have lower ambitions to fight for it here.".

Baron's partner, playwriter Shlomi Moskovitz, says about their joint work: “I am blessed to live with Dedi Baron, who is not only my love, but also a truly tremendous director. So I just let go. I rarely show up at rehearsals, I seldom arrive, and I think that as the years go by I’ve learnt to let go more and more. Because in the beginning, while working on previous plays with Dedi, it was very hard for me. She would say: ‘Look, this sentence is redundant, we are cutting it out.’ This would stress me out enormously, I would refuse, and start getting into arguments. I think that during the process of rehearsals for ‘A Star will Shine’ I learned to let go, to cut things out. That play speaks about cutting things out and, suddenly, I'm telling myself: ’Come on, I am talking about cutting things out, when I can’t even do it myself!’. I have this sentence that I am in love with, and Dedi says: ’Listen, you’re right, it is lovely, but it doesn’t sit well inside the situation. We don’t need it, this is subtext, let’s get rid of it’. And I think I learned that”.

== Critical acclaim ==
- "Post-Trauma": "Creatively directed by Dedi Baron and Tal Brenner, with an energetic and precise performance of all the cast, this is a young-at-heart play, providing a fresh, uninhibited perspective of the trauma of both sides" (Shay Bar-Yaakov, "third and a half generation", "Yedioth Ahronoth", January 5, 2011).
- "A Star will Shine": "Baron’s direction is precise and full of ideas, and those allow the drama to transpire, with the help of an excellent cast" (Maya Nahum Shachal, Calcalist, January 6, 2011).
- "Tasting Meal": "What makes this play an actual delight is the polished performance, that the director, Baron, has managed to produce from the talented case, including Limor Goldstein, Motti Katz, Aya Granit Shva, Yoav Levi, Hadar Baruch, David Shaul. All of them are doing their work with great skill and create an entertaining play, maintaining the correct balance between dramatic and playful moments" (Shay Bar-Yaakov, "The last wedding vision", "Yedioth Ahronoth", April 4, 2016).
- "A Tasting Meal": "Both play and direction are on a slightly higher wavelength than usually in the Israeli theatre, and set an ambiance of a rare refinement. This could be due to the fact that the majority of Dedi Baron's plays during the last years were staged in the German theatre, of all places. The German influence manifests itself in the minimalistic décor, which is based on an amusing object, designed by Dana Tzarfati – a sort of huge sofa, with multiple seats, acting as a stage within a stage, giving an ironic conclusion to the history of the sofa as a décor in the Israeli theatre days" (Marat Parkhomovsky, "A Tasting Meal: A refined bourekas comedy”. "City Mouse", April 11, 2016).
- “This is the Great Sea”: “Director Dedi Baron has put together a delicate and beautiful play, with a lovely balance between realistic and stylish, using very impressive movement work designed by Yehezkel Lazarov, who is also very convincing as the lead actor, and brings emotional depth and enchanting charm to the play" (Shay Bar-Yaakov, "Life work". Yedioth Ahronoth, March 12, 2007).
- "The Retreat from Moscow": "The clean and designed directing by Baron, enabled by IlIl Earm’s beautiful design, and by Ori Vidislavski’s excellent soundtrack, help to develop an ironic, somewhat distant look on the raging drama, and is a great contributor to the evening’s success. In conclusion – a smart, touching play, that reminds us just how much love is fragile and the scope of faith it takes to survive its wreckage" (Shay Bar-Yaakov, "Surviving the wreckage of love". Yedioth Ahronoth, April 3, 2005).
- "A Week": "Playwright Shlomi Moskovitz and director Dedi Baron have created the play ‘A Week’ together, in Habima; a poetic play about an old lover revisiting and enticing a grown woman, sweeping her away from her family and the life she was accustomed to. This special play, which combines alternative biblical interpretations with sensitive dialogues and is full of linguistic accuracy, has turned into a thrilling play, due to the sensitive direction and committed performance of four terrific actors – Idit Teperson and Mohammad Bakri both of whom have significant mileage on stage, and along them – Ofer Zohar and Michal Varshai – who are not as known, but are just as talented" ("The best in the city – Shay Bar-Yaakov sums up the theatre season"”, Yedioth Ahronoth, August 15th, 2003).
