= Atzmon (disambiguation) =

Atzmon is a communal settlement in Gush Segev in the Galilee region of Israel.

Atzmon (Hebrew: עַצְמוֹן) may also refer to:

== People with the surname ==
- Anat Atzmon (born 1958)
- Gilad Atzmon (born 1963), Israeli-born British saxophonist, novelist, political activist, and writer
- Moshe Atzmon (born 1931), Hungarian-born Israeli conductor
- Yitzhak Atzmon, Israeli actor who starred in the film Buzz

== Places ==
- Bnei Atzmon, also Atzmona, a former Israeli settlement on the Sinai peninsula

== Related words ==
- Azmon (another spelling)
- Atzmona (female form)
