= Shoshani =

Shoshani is a surname. Notable people with the surname include:

- Hila Rotem-Shoshani (born 2010), Israeli abducted by Hamas as part of the October 7 attacks
- Jeheskel Shoshani (1943–2008), Israeli elephant biologist
- Shir Shoshani (born 1979), Israeli film professional and academic administrator

== See also ==
- Monsieur Chouchani (1895–1968), nickname of an anonymous Jewish teacher also known as Monsieur Shoshani
