= The Loners (2009 film) =

- Theatrical release poster
- הבודדים
- Directed by: Renen Schorr
- Screenplay by: Guy Meirson; Renen Schorr; Moshe Zonder
- Based on: True events that took place in 1997
- Produced by: Assaf Amir
- Starring: Sasha Netzach Agarunov; Anton Ostrovsky; Rotem Zussman; Tzahi Grad; Henry David
- Cinematography: David Gurfinkel
- Edited by: Einat Glaser-Zarhin
- Music by: Shem-Tov Levy
- Production companies: EZ Films; Norma Productions
- Distributed by: EZ Films (worldwide); Norma Productions (Israel)
- Release date: June 7, 2009 (Cinema South Film Festival Sderot)
- Running time: 92 minutes
- Country: Israel
- Languages: Hebrew; Russian

The Loners (Hebrew: הבודדים) is a 2009 Israeli drama film directed by Renen Schorr starring Sasha Netzach Agarunov and Anton Ostrovsky.

The film describes the takeover of a cell block in Prison Six by two inmates, both new immigrants from Russia, soldiers from the Golani Brigade, who were sent to prison for selling weapons to Hamas, and who were demanding a retrial.

== Background ==
The original screenplay was inspired by true events. In 1997, there was a rebellion in Prison Six, during which a number of inmates took over the dining room and captured several prison instructors and sergeants.

== Plot ==
Bluchin, a fighter of the Israel Defense Forces (IDF) Golani Brigade, receives a notice that he is accepted for officers' training. He goes out to celebrate with his friend Glory. The two soldiers are new immigrants of Russian origin, with no relatives in Israel. Some time later, two men are arrested, charged and convicted of selling weapons to Hamas, which were used to carry out an attack in Hadera, which killed five civilians.

The two fighters, who are perceived as traitors, do not want to lose their honor as fighters in the IDF, and request a retrial. But the military system is not interested and decides to release them from the army and transfer them to a civil prison to continue serving their sentences. This causes them to take over a cell block, take as hostages three of the prison's personnel and request a retrial.

During these events, they confide in one of the prison staff, a woman soldier named Ilanit, that Bluchin did not sell any weapons, but had forgotten his personal weapon at a whore that he visited when they celebrated. To help him, Glory stole a weapon from the unit's arsenal and handed it to Bluchin, so the fact that he has lost his own weapon would not be known.

== Cast ==
- Sasha Netzach Agarunov as Glory
- Anton Ostrovsky as Bluchin
- Rotem Zussman as Ilanit
- Tzahi Grad as General Ben Aroya
- Henry David as Sergeant Galperin

== Awards ==
- Tzahi Grad in the movie
  Actor Sasha Netzach Agarunov received an Ophir Award for best actor in a lead role.
- The movie received 10 more nominations for the Ophir Award, in art direction, cinematography, direction, editing, music, screenplay, sound, best supporting actor, best supporting actress and best film.
- The movie was nominated for best film at the Jerusalem Film Festival.

== See also ==
- Late Summer Blues - Schorr's previous feature film.
