= List of Israeli films of 1980 =

A list of films produced by the Israeli film industry in 1980.

== 1980 releases ==
Premiere	Title	Director	Cast	Genre	Notes	Ref
7 September	Machboim (Hebrew: מחבואים, lit. "Hide and seek")	Dan Wolman	Gila Almagor	Drama		
October	Al Hevel Dak (Hebrew: על חבל דק, lit. "On a tightrope")	Michal Bat-Adam	Gila Almagor	Drama		

=== Unknown premiere date ===
Premiere	Title	Director	Cast	Genre	Notes	Ref
?	Hamesh Hamesh (Hebrew: חמש חמש, lit. "Five Five")	Shmuel Imberman	Gilat Ankori, Eli Gorenstein, Dalik Volonitz	Musical		
?	Hayeh Ahaltah Otah (Hebrew: חייך אכלת אותה, lit. "Smile, you have been fooled")	Yehuda Barkan and Yigal Shilon	Yehuda Barkan	Candid camera		
?	Pitzei Bagrut 80 (Hebrew: פצעי בגרות 80, lit. "Growing Pains 80")	Ze'ev Revach	Sharon Alexander, Dalia Shimko	Drama		
?	Kohav Hashahar (Hebrew: כוכב השחר, lit. "Morning Star")	Akiva Barkin	Alon Aboutboul, Moshe Ivgy, Gavri Banai, Dori Ben-Ze'ev	Drama		
?	Ha-Pachdanim (Hebrew: הפחדנים, lit. "The Cowards")	Avi Nesher	Chelli Goldenberg, Meir Suissa	Drama		

== See also ==
- 1980 in Israel
