= Hide and Seek (1980 film) =

- Film poster
- Hebrew: מחבואים
- Directed by: Dan Wolman
- Written by: Avi Cohen; Dan Wolman
- Produced by: Jeffrey Justin; Dan Wolman
- Starring: Chaim Hadaya; Doron Tavory
- Cinematography: Ilan Rosenberg
- Edited by: Shosh Wolman
- Music by: Amnon Wolman
- Release date: 12 December 1980
- Running time: 90 minutes
- Country: Israel
- Language: Hebrew
- Budget: $100,000

Hide and Seek (Hebrew: מחבואים, Machboim) is an Israeli drama film, directed by Dan Wolman. It was written by Avi Cohena and Wolman and had a limited theatrical release in 1980. The film stars Gila Almagor, Benyamin Armon, Chaim Hadaya, Efrat Lavie, Rahel Shor and Doron Tavory.

The movie is the first Israeli film ever to address themes of homosexuality. The film is set in Jerusalem during the British Mandate period in 1946, and along with homosexuality, it also seriously examines issues of nationalism and bravery.

== Synopsis ==
The film is set in Jerusalem in 1946 and centers on twelve–year–old Uri, who lives with his bookish grandfather as his parents are involved in the resistance movement against the British occupation.

Uri is doing poorly in his school studies, so he requires a tutor, Balaban, who he initially dislikes, but eventually develops a warm and friendly relationship with. There is also a growing suspicion in the community where Url resides that there is a British informer amongst them.

Meanwhile, Uri and his friends are eager to join the anti-British underground, and they distrust Balaban's unwillingness to commit himself to the fight, deciding he must be a spy when they see him hanging around with young Arabs. So when Uri witnesses Balaban exchanging letters with an Arab, he goes to the authorities and reports Balaban as a spy.

Only later does he discover that Balaban is not an agent for the British but the homosexual lover of the Arab, which results in the tutor getting beaten by the Haganah, a Zionist paramilitary organization that operated for the Yishuv; and Balaban is expelled from teaching at the school as well.

== Cast ==
- Doron Tavory as Balaban
- Chaim Hadaya as Uri
- Gila Almagor as Mother
- Binyamin Armon as Grandfather
- Efrat Lavie
- Rahel Shor
- Arik Rosen

== Production ==
External image
- Chaim Hadaya in Hide and Seek (via The Berkeley Gazette)

The film had a limited budget, so it was shot over a period of 14 days with just 10 crew members. Wolman did not have any extra money for film props, so he resorted to advertising in Israel newspapers to borrow vehicles from the 1940s. He cast Irish United Nations soldiers who were on vacation in Israel to play the British mandate officers.

He shot the movie on 16 millimeter film which he later enlarged to 35 millimeter. After each day's shoot, he sent it overseas for processing, because United Studios in Herzliya, "maintained a monopoly in Israel" and charged prices that Wolman said were "prohibitive." Since he had to send it out of country for processing, that meant he did not have a chance to see the dailies, which according to Wolman, did not make a difference anyway, as he did not have the funds to reshoot any scenes. Ilan Rosenberg, the cinematographer for the film, offered his services for free, and if the film managed to make a profit, then he would be paid.

Wolman told The Times of India about his experience making the film:

If you are a serious filmmaker, you have to relate to what is happening around you. In the beginning, films were made showing Israelis as heroes and Arabs as less-than-human and brutal. But when I made Hide and Seek, the story was about the relationship between two Jewish and Arab men, who are pursued by a group of boys fanatical against Arabs.

== Reception ==
The authors of Israeli Film: A Reference Guide, opined that "the film portrays the demands of conformity and loyalty when living in a society under siege; Wolman weaves together the private anguish of an individual with the external pressures and political events of the time." Film researcher Raz Yosef wrote "the film critically links pre–state nationalist anxieties and fears of biracial homosexuality; male–male desire is perceived as a threat to national security and as alien, unnatural behavior because of its 'un–Zionist' practice, its sexual entanglement with the Arab enemy; the film conflates homosexuality and fears of Arab infiltration to show that homophobia and nationalist ideology are closely intertwined."

Author Eran Kaplan observed that the film "offers a critical look at the formative years of Israeli society told from the perspective of a child; while the young Arab lover is crucial to the movie's plot, and to the boy losing his innocence both sexually and politically, we know very little about the Arab character; in the tradition of the personal Israel cinema, the movie is ultimately a story of disillusionment from a Jewish perspective with the formative ideology of the state: it turned children into informers who were quick to turn against people who were close to them."

Patricia Erens wrote in Film Comment that in the film "Wolman attempts to interweave personal and socio-political dilemmas; if ultimately Hide and Seek fails, it is because of Wolman's failure to delve into the repercussions of individual actions at the film's close." Jane Friedman stated "this delicate and touching film says many things both about the inability of a siege state to tolerate individual differences and about the fall from innocence of human beings in general."

Rick Groen of The Globe and Mail commented it is a "delicate, understated portrait of the developing relationship between a 12-year-old boy and his tutor; in one especially heart-rending scene, two Italian waifs, twins orphaned by the war, literally sing for their supper — the song serves as an audition for a prospective set of parents in the promised land; the audition fails and one child, already a hardened survivor with huge, unblinking eyes that mirror her silent suffering, casually pilfers a silver napkin ring from the host's table." Film critic Kevin Thomas said the film is as "expressive as it is subtle, a testament to Wolman's talent and judgment."

== Accolades ==
The film won the Israeli Silver Rose Award for best film and best director.

== Aftermath ==
In 2023, Wolman reported that a crew member of the film and his wife's sister's granddaughter were among the victims kidnapped by Hamas in the Gaza war.

== See also ==
- Cinema of Israel
- Culture of Israel
- List of Israeli films of 1980
- List of LGBTQ-related films of 1980
