= The Quarrel =

- Directed by: Eli Cohen
- Written by: Chaim Grade, David Brandes and Joseph Telushkin
- Produced by: David Brandes
- Starring: Saul Rubinek; R. H. Thomson
- Cinematography: John Berrie
- Edited by: Havelock Gradidge
- Music by: William Goldstein
- Release date: 1991
- Running time: 85 minutes
- Country: Canada
- Language: English

The Quarrel is a 1991 Canadian film directed by Eli Cohen and starring Saul Rubinek and R. H. Thomson. The film was written by David Brandes and Joseph Telushkin.

== Plot ==
Two estranged friends – one a rabbi and the other an agnostic writer— are compelled to resume an argument that caused a separation between the pair many years earlier after a chance meeting pushes the duo together once more.

== See also ==
- List of Holocaust films
