= Debbi Besserglick =

Israeli actress (1955–2005)

- דבי בסרגליק
- Born: Dvora Besserglick; 19 November 1955; Jaffa, Israel
- Died: 10 March 2005 (aged 49); Tel Aviv, Israel
- Occupations: Actress; voice artist; theatre director; dramatist
- Years active: 1986–2005

Dvora "Debbi" Besserglick (Hebrew: דבי בסרגליק; 19 November 1955 – 10 March 2005) was an Israeli actress and voice actress.

== Biography ==
Born as Dvora Besserglick in Jaffa, Besserglick studied at Tel Aviv University and the Levinsky College of Education. She then went on to become an actress, usually working in the theatre or television. She starred in and even directed theatre adaptions of musical plays such as My Fair Lady, The Sound of Music and West Side Story yet she was also a film and television actress. Her most popular filmography included the 1997 black-comedy film The 92 Minutes of Mr. Baum and the 1998 film Buzz. Besserglick also starred in the children's television show BeSod HaYinyanim in which she appeared in an office sketch with Ruby Porat-Shoval.

Besserglick was also successful as a voice actress. She was well known for voicing the title character in the Hebrew dub of the children's animated show Arthur. She also provided the Hebrew voices of many characters such as Virulina in Visionaries: Knights of the Magical Light, Widow Tweed from The Fox and the Hound, Grandmother Fa in Mulan II, Pearl in Home on the Range, Timon's mother in The Lion King 1½, Mama Gunda in Tarzan II and many other animated films and cartoons.

== Death ==
Besserglick died of cancer on 10 March 2005, at the age of 49 and she was interred at Yarkon Cemetery. The Hebrew voice of Arthur Read was passed on to Shiri Gadni.
