= Silver Menorah Award =

Israeli film award

The Silver Menorah Award (פרסי מנורת הכסף) was established in Israel in 1988. It was issued for works in film industry in 1986-1988 and 1989. In 1990 it was superseded by the Israeli Film Academy Awards (now known as the Ophir Awards).

The first ceremony was held in September 1988, for the films produced during 1986–1988. It was supposed to replace the nickname "Israeli Oscar" given in the several previous years for Israeli feature films, such as the Israeli Film Center Award (פרסי מרכז הסרט הישראלי) or Kinor David award. It was intended for the films released between February 1986 and July 1988 and which did not participate in any previous awards. 35 films were selected to take part in the competition.

== 1988 ceremony ==
=== 1986-1987 films ===
- Late Summer Blues (1987), Best Film award, best screenwriter award for Doron Nesher, best musical score for Rafi Kadishzon
- Shtei Etzbaot Mi'Tzidon (1986) (Hebrew: שתי אצבעות מצידון, lit. "Two Fingers from Sidon"), known in English releases as Ricochets; Best Film award, best director award for Eli Cohen, best cinematographer award for Yehiel Ne'eman

=== 1987-1988 films ===
- Tel Aviv–Berlin (1987), Best Film award
- Aviya's Summer Best Actress" for Gila Almagor, "Best Director" for Eli Cohen, special mention for the performance of a child for Kaipo Cohen

== 1989 ceremony ==
- Fictitious Marriage (1988); awards: Best film, direction - Haim Bouzaglo, lead actor - Shlomo Bar-Aba, supporting actress - Idit Teperson, editing - Tova Asher, photography - Amnon Salomon
