= Mor Eldar =

Israeli filmmaker (born 1973)

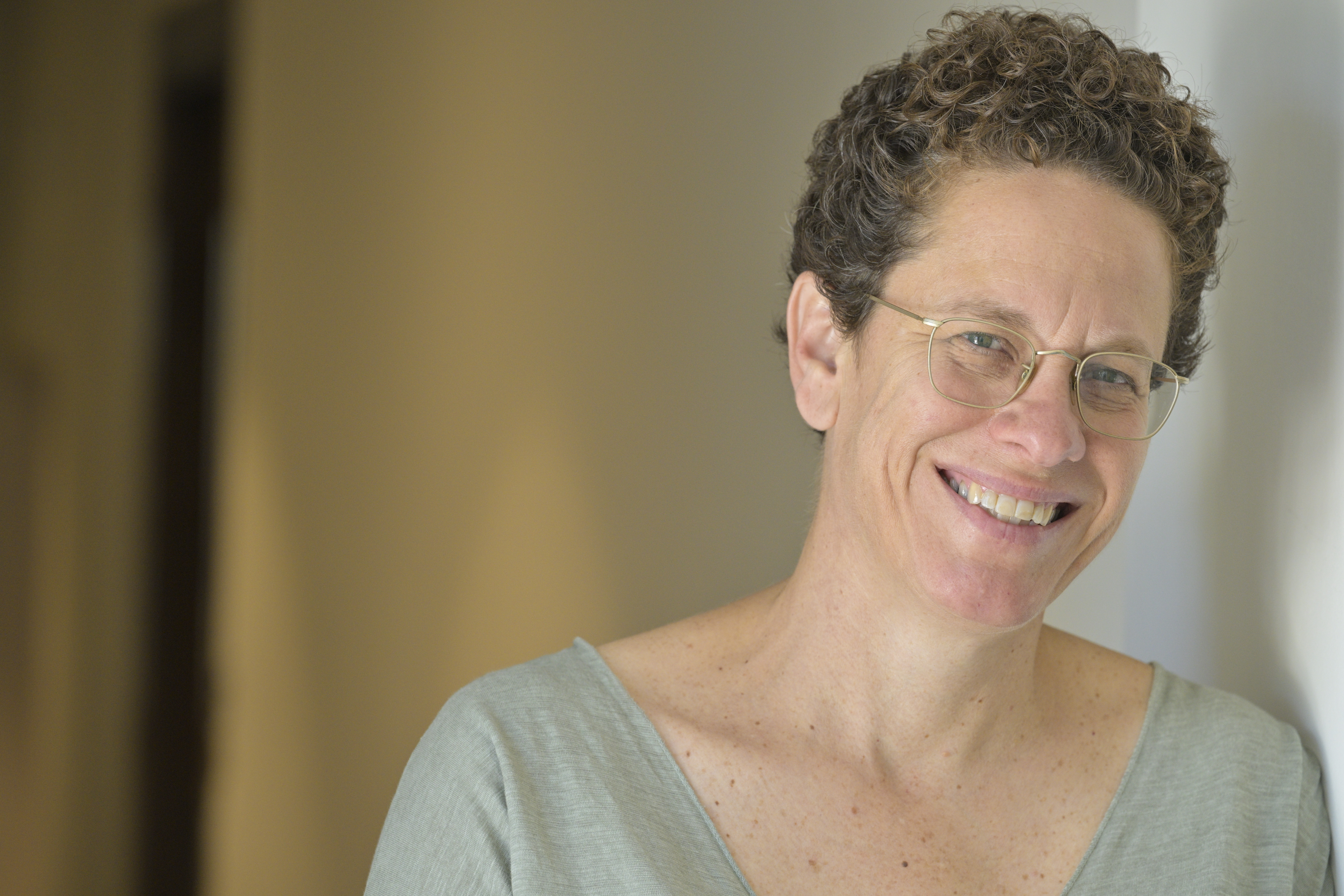
Mor Eldar, 2023

Mor Eldar (Hebrew: מור אלדר; born October 13, 1973) is a content manager in the Israeli film and television industry.

== Career ==
Eldar began working at the Lev Cinema chain in 1998, where she established the events department while she was also the associate director of distribution. In 2000, she joined the newly formed YES Satellite television as an acquisition manager and remained there for three years. She then joined producer Marek Rozenbaum's company Transfax as distribution manager and post production producer. In 2005, she went back to the Lev Cinema chain in the role of distribution and marketing manager. In 2008, she established and managed the Holon Cinematheque and then in 2009 returned as the head of the movie department and head commissioner of films at YES Satellite.

Eldar has also served as a jury member at the Jerusalem Film Festival and at the Tel Aviv International Student Film Festival.

In 2022, Eldar was appointed director of the Sam Spiegel Film and Television School International Film and Series Lab.
