= Under the Domim Tree =

1994 film

- Film poster
- Directed by: Eli Cohen
- Written by: Gila Almagor; Eyal Sher; Eli Cohen
- Produced by: Gila Almagor; Eitan Evan
- Starring: Gila Almagor
- Cinematography: David Gurfinkel
- Edited by: Danny Shick
- Release date: 1994
- Running time: 102 minutes
- Country: Israel
- Language: Hebrew

Under the Domim Tree (Hebrew: עץ הדומים תפוס, romanized: Etz Hadomim Tafus) is a 1994 Israeli film based on the 1992 book of the same name by Gila Almagor. The film was directed by Eli Cohen, and screened in the Un Certain Regard section at the 1995 Cannes Film Festival.

Both the book and the film are sequels to Almagor's 1985 autobiographical book, Summer of Aviya, about the protagonist's childhood in the 1950s in Israel. Under the Domim Tree tells of Aviya's years in the Oudim boarding school and about the relations that are formed between the Israeli-born students and the students who survived the Holocaust.

== Plot ==
The film follows the lives and struggles of several teenagers, focusing on Aviya, an Israeli sabra whose father was killed in 1939 in Israel and whose mother suffers from mental illness. The youths, all orphans and most of them Holocaust survivors, live in a communal farming village.

In the opening scene, set in the winter of 1953, a large group of adults and teenagers are shown searching for Misha, a young boy from the boarding house. He is eventually found drowned in a river, having committed suicide. It quickly becomes apparent that he, along with Yurek and Ze'evik, had regularly run through the woods at night, a result of having hidden in the forest for two years during the Holocaust. Yurek and Ze'evik cease this behavior temporarily, to the relief of the headmasters and their peers, before resuming it several months later.

A new girl, Miriam "Mira" Segal, arrives at the boarding house in the spring. She proves uncooperative with the living arrangements and is openly hostile at times, drawing ire from the other girls.

Aviya still hopes that her mother, Henya, who has been institutionalized for years, will recover and regularly visits the hospital where Henya lives. Henya believed she had been in Europe during the Holocaust even though she and her husband had left prior to the war. She later becomes romantically involved with Yurek, whose behavior she is concerned for but does not question. Both, along with Ze'evik, frequently take comfort in sitting under the domim (crab apple) tree near the boarding house.

Their lives seem to improve over the next few weeks, with a plan being made for the youths to plant hundreds of tulip bulbs around the domim tree and Yola, another girl at the home, finding out that her father is still alive in Warsaw. The entire community rejoices for Yola, with several girls helping her prepare for the trip to Poland and other children requesting that she deliver letters to relatives they believe may still be alive while there. However, tragedy strikes and Yola's father dies suddenly before she can see him.

Aviya receives a letter from an aunt containing a photograph of her father and the name of a cemetery. As a result, she is able to find and visit her father's grave in Haifa.

Shortly afterwards, Ariel, the headmaster, succumbs to pressure from a psychologist to separate Yurek and Ze'evik in order to avoid a repeat of what happened to Misha. In response, they hide in the woods before appearing again a few days later, saying, "We stay together or we die." Ariel quickly agrees that they will not be separated.

Weeks later, a couple arrives at the youth village claiming to be Mira's parents. Despite having no memory of her family before they were killed in the Holocaust, she adamantly denies the allegation and tells the other girls that the man and woman had found her at an orphanage in Italy after the war and told her that they were her parents. She moved to Israel with them and eventually ran away after the man became physically and emotionally abusive.

The case is taken to court, and the rest of the youth immediately put aside past frustrations and give Mira their undivided support. Through this turn of events, Mira is able to remember her mother's face, disproving the couple's claims, and, because of the kindness shown by the other children, learns to trust again.

== Cast ==
- Kaipo Cohen as Aviya
- Gila Almagor as Henya
- Juliano Mer as Ariel
- Ohad Knoller as Yurek
- Jenya Katsen as Ze'evik
- Orli Perl as Yola
- Riki Blich as Mira
- Aya Schtiftal as Sarah B.
- Olga Guzman as Sarah Lef

== Background ==
Under the Domim Tree is a sequel to Summer of Aviya, both of which are adaptions of books written by Israeli actress Gila Almagor. Almagor drew from her childhood experiences when writing the books: her mother, after losing her entire family to the Holocaust and her husband to an Arab sniper, became mentally unstable and was institutionalized in 1954. The young Almagor was subsequently sent to the Hadassim youth village where she lived among numerous Holocaust orphans. The character of Aviya is loosely based on Almagor, and her mother, Henya, is portrayed by Almagor herself in both films.

== Reception ==
A TV Guide review gave the movie three out of four stars and said, "A sweetly romantic teen film about the Holocaust? Well, yes, and not a bad one...Aviya's mother (played by Almagor, who also coproduced and cowrote the screenplay) is in an asylum, and most of her friends are war orphans. Together they fall in love, bicker, study, try to track down the remnants of their scattered families and forget the war that haunts their dreams. The kibbutz's domim (crab apple) tree is where they go to sit when it's all too much. Sentimental, to be sure, but touchingly acted and a welcome antidote to the epic grandiosity of Schindler's List."
