= Renen Schorr =

Israeli film director (1952–2025)

- רנן שור
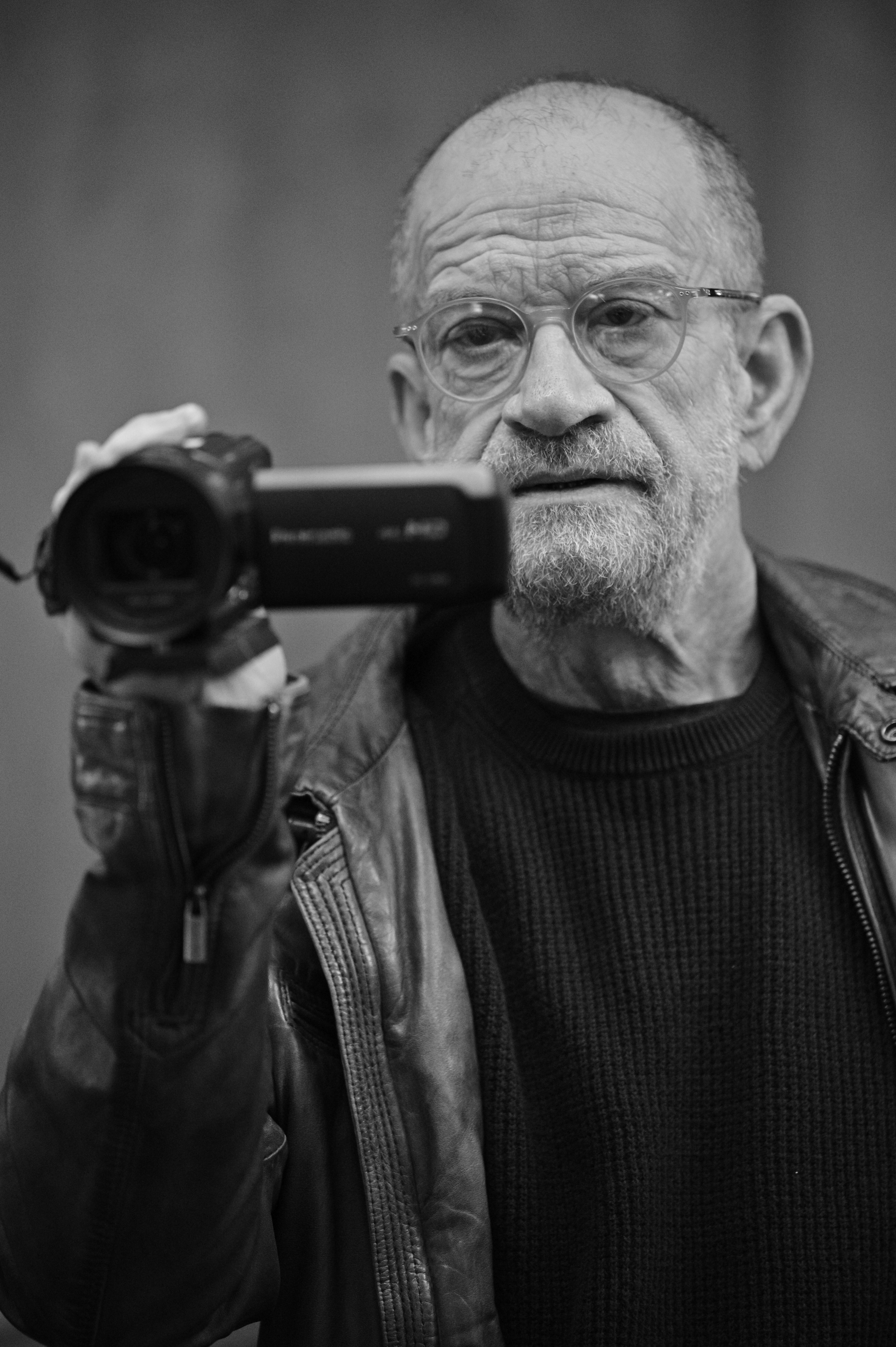
- Born: 6 July 1952; Jerusalem, Israel
- Died: 26 February 2025 (aged 72); Tel Aviv, Israel
- Occupations: Film director; film producer; screenwriter

Renen Schorr (Hebrew: רנן שור; 6 July 1952 – 26 February 2025) was an Israeli film director, screenwriter, producer and activist. In 1989, he founded Israel's first independent, national school for film and television, the Sam Spiegel Film and Television School – Jerusalem, and served as its director from that time, until his death. During the last 40 years he founded or co-founded the infrastructure of Israeli film funds and cinematheques. In December 2016 he was awarded the Chevalier des arts et lettres by the French government.

== Accomplishments ==
In 1979, Schorr founded the Israel Film Fund together with Judd Ne'eman and Yeud Levanon. The Fund revolutionized the industry by shifting public support from the Ministry of Commerce and Industry to the Ministry of Education and Culture, an act that recognized the cultural value of a film over its mere commercial worth. In addition, the Fund gave unprecedented power to the director over the producer.

Schorr was the co-director of the Beit Zvi Film School from 1982 to 1985, and in July 1989, was chosen to found a new film school in Jerusalem, now the Jerusalem Sam Spiegel Film and Television School.

Schorr saw to it that Israeli film schools, Steve Tisch School of Film and Television at Tel Aviv University and the Sam Spiegel Film and Television School, became members of GEECT, the European Union of film schools. In 2000, he was chosen by 70 of his fellow school directors to serve as president of CILECT/GEECT. During his four-year term, he initiated and organized numerous conferences about European cinema, aiming to define and characterize European cinema as opposed to American films, and to advance the standing of the entrepreneurial producer. Schorr worked with the European Film Academy under the presidency of German director Wim Wenders and championed the inclusion of Israel as a member of the Academy.

In 1992, Schorr devised the creation of another fund, the New Fund for Film and Television, which spearheaded a revolution in independent documentary filmmaking in Israel. The establishment of such a fund resulted in the flourishing of the documentary, which had previously been an underserved and underdeveloped product of public television.

In 2001, Renen Schorr initiated and edited the prize-winning dramatic series Voices from the Heartland for Israeli commercial TV. The enterprise served as an incubator for select young talents, graduates of various Israeli film schools. At a point where opportunities to work in the creative dramatic field were few and far between, Schorr created a supportive platform for these individuals to create their first dramatic efforts, paving the way for their entrance to the foreground of Israeli television and cinema. Voices From the Heartland went on to win six prizes in the Jerusalem Film Festival, 2001 and 2002. Two of the films from the series, James' Journey to Jerusalem, directed by Ra'anan Alexandrowicz, and Slaves of the Lord by Hadar Friedlich were screened at Cannes Director's Fortnight 2001.

In 2008, Schorr led the formation of Israel's first municipal film fund, the Jerusalem Film and Television Fund. Among the 60 films and television shows that the Fund has supported are A Tale of Love and Darkness by Natalie Portman, “The Policeman” by Nadav Lapid and “Dig” by Gideon Raff. Renen Schorr served as chairperson of the board of directors at the Fund.

In 2008, he set up the Herzeliya Cinematheque and the Holon Cinematheque. This was part of his vision to expand the audience for both Israeli and independent films as an alternative to commercial chains.

Schorr served as a juror for numerous international competitions and festivals including Berlinale (2011), the Sarajevo Film Festival (2016), DocAviv (2009) and the Israel Prize (2004). He conducted masterclasses about the methodology of the Sam Spiegel Film School at various film schools such as Sarajevo, Istanbul, Berlin, New York and San Jose, Costa Rica.

== The Jerusalem Sam Spiegel Film School ==
The school works on a triangular model and offers three tracks: the Full Track – Training students in directing, screenwriting, cinematography, editing and production. In 1999, the school began a two-year track for screenwriters, with the aim of creating a model for cooperation between screenwriters and directors, and with a specialization in writing for television. In 2004, the school inaugurated a four-year track for entrepreneur producers, the first of its kind in Israel.

Since the first crop of films in 1993, the school has become recognized as one of the leading film schools in the world, winning over 290 international prizes, among them 15 awards as the World's Best School, as well as recognition at over 160 international festivals, museums and film schools in 55 countries. The Faculty of Asian and Middle Eastern Studies at University of Cambridge has held a tribute to the school two years in a row, 2016 and 2017. The school's films have twice won the First Prize at the Cannes Film Festival (2008, 2016).

Under the direction of Renen Schorr, The Sam Spiegel International Film Lab was launched in December 2011, with the goal of fostering the development and production of full-length feature films by some of the world's most promising talents. The Sam Spiegel International Film Lab became the third film lab of its kind in the world, along with The Sundance Institute and The Torino Film Lab in Italy. The Academy Award-winning film Son of Saul, by László Nemes was developed at the Sam Spiegel International Film Lab in 2014.

In October 2014, as part of the 25th anniversary celebrations for the school, Schorr initiated a fifth film fund. The Sam Spiegel Alumni Fund for First Features was set up with the aim of supporting alumni as they make their first feature film.

== Major films as director ==
Schorr's 1985 short film, A Wedding in Jerusalem, told for the first time, the story of two of Israel's leading cultural figures; director Uri Zohar and singer Arik Einstein, on the occasion of the Orthodox wedding of their children. Unprecedented, A Wedding in Jerusalem was screened in cinemas across the country as the film before the Coen Brother's Blood Simple. The film was restored in 2016 and was the opening film at the Jerusalem Jewish Film Festival, at the Jerusalem Cinematheque.

Late Summer Blues (1987) is Schorr's most prominent film. It won the Silver Menorah Award for best film, the best screenplay and best original score, as well as the prize for outstanding film in the Israel Film Festivals in New York and Los Angeles. The film opened the Jerusalem Film Festival in 1987 to rave reviews and became a commercial success seen by 20,000 people, It was screened in 30 international festivals including, Montreal, Moscow, Toronto, Chicago, Los Angeles, Vienna, Dublin, Hong Kong. The film was released in the United States and Canada. Over the years, the movie has become a cultural icon.

After undergoing digital restoration, Late Summer Blues was released for screenings around Israel in honor of its 30th anniversary in 2016.

The Loners (HaBodedim) debuted in November 2009. Inspired by true events that took place in an Israeli military prison in 1997, the film explores the plight of two young Russian immigrant soldiers who are falsely accused of treason.

The Loners was nominated for 11 Ophir Prizes (Israeli Academy Awards), and was named winner of the Best Actor Award (Sasha Agronov) and Best Film Award at The South Festival. It was chosen Winner of the Best Film Award, Open Doek Festival in Belgium, and participated in such festivals such as the Pusan Film Festival, South Korea, Cape Town Film Festival, Seattle International Film Festival, Cottbus Film Festival Germany, Tirana International Film Festival Albania, London Jewish Film Festival, Toronto Jewish Film Festival, the Boston Jewish Film Festival, and IsraFest L.A. Despite all of this, the film did not gain commercial success.

As a screenwriter and script editor, Schorr wrote the screenplays for his own short films, served as a script consultant-as well as assistant director to both Uri Zohar, and to Judd Ne’eman on his film Paratroopers (1977). He edited the screenplay for the international award-winning film Broken Wings (2002) directed by Nir Bergman.

== Background ==
Son of a physician, Prof. Sam Schorr, grandson of historian Dr. Alexander Schorr, descendant of Rabbi Joseph Bechor Schorr, a 12th-century Talmudic commentator from Orléans, France. Sixth generation Israeli on the side of his mother, Lea Heller, the daughter of Rabbi Avraham Zeide Heller of Safed.

Schorr, who grew up in Tel Aviv, was attracted to the theater from a young age. He played the role of Artful Dodger in Habima's national production of Oliver! and the Crown Prince in Giora Godik's troupe production of The King and I.

During his compulsory military service he served as a journalist for the IDF magazine BaMahaneh. In 1974 he was nominated for the Sokolov Journalism Prize (akin to the Pulitzer Prize) – for a series of articles about battles for the Golan Heights in the Yom Kippur War.

Once out of the army, Schorr studied filmmaking at Tel Aviv University, department of film, while also working as assistant director to Judd Neeman and Uri Zohar. In 1979 he won a scholarship from the Israel America Culture Foundation and went to the US where, among other things, was on the sets of filmmakers such as John Cassavetes, Paul Mazursky and worked in Los Angeles with Oscar-nominated screenwriter Steve Shagan on the first draft of his film Late Summer Blues.

Schorr died of a heart attack on February 26, 2025, at the age of 72.

== Films directed ==
- After Duty (1977) (short film)
- The Battle of Fort Williams (1981) (short film)
- Wedding in Jerusalem (1985) (short film)
- Late Summer Blues (1987)
- HaBodedim (2009)

== Films produced ==
- Off the Air (Yeud Levanon, 1981)
- Late Summer Blues (1987)
- Black to the Promised Land (Madeleine Ali, 1992)
- Miss Entebbe (Omri Levy, 2003)
- James' Journey to Jerusalem (Ra'anan Alexandrovitch, 2003)
- Voices from the Heartland - dramatic series (2001, 2002
