= Anton Ostrovsky =

Anton KLIN Ostrovsky
- אנטון "קלין" אוסטרובסקי
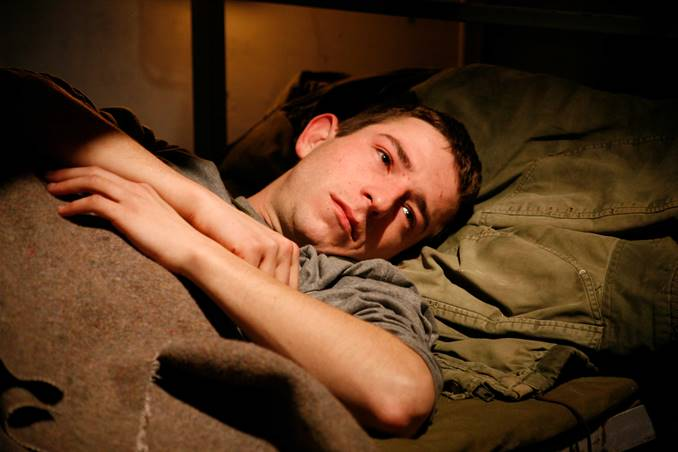
- Ostrovsky in The Loners
- Born: Anton Ostrovsky; 1982 (age 43–44); Novocherkassk, Rostov Oblast, USSR (now Russia)
- Occupations: actor; singer; rapper
- Awards: Nominated for Ophir priza as Best Supporting Actor in 2009 for his role in The Loners

Anton 'Klin' Ostrovsky (Hebrew: אנטון "קלין" אוסטרובסקי; born 6 June 1982) is an Israeli actor and rap singer.

== Biography ==
Anton was born in Novocherkassk, Rostov Oblast, USSR (now Russia) in 1982 as the eldest son.

He visited Israel at age 14 in one of the frames of the Jewish Agency for Israel. In 1997, his family immigrated to Israel and lived in Ma'aleh Adumim.

He founded the rap group "Sadyle" in 2003 and "Tel-Aviv Hardcore."

== Filmography ==
=== Cinema ===
- 2011: Central Station as Andrei
- 2011: Question Signs
- 2011: Barriers (short movie) as Alex
- 2009: Warning
- 2009: The Loners as Sacha Blokhin

=== Television ===
- 2012: Merkaz as David
- 2012: The Gordin Cell as Witzosky
- 2010: Blue Natalie as Boris
- 2005: Mummy! as Dima
