= Theatronetto =

Theatronetto (Hebrew: תיאטרונטו) is an annual Israeli theater festival that exhibits monodramas, and takes place in the city of Tel Aviv since 1990. The festival establishes a direct dialogue between the solo actor and the viewing audience. The festival takes place during the Jewish holiday of Passover, usually in April. Its main event is a contest, to which are attended by only a few monoactors.

The festival's name is a mix of the Hebrew words theatron (meaning theater) and netto (meaning only, just). The name emphasizes the essence of the festival, which is exposing the audience to monologues, the rawest and oldest forms of theater, and testing the actors' verbal delivery abilities and presenting the monologue as an enjoyable and crowd-swaying story and play.

Some of the finest actors in Israel have performed on the festival's stage and have promoted the difficult form of monologue in Israeli theater. Traditionally the festival took place at the Suzanne Dellal Center, and later on moved to Habima Theater; once to Acre as well; and included only Israeli plays, but in 2008 it moved to the alleys of Old Jaffa and since then, it has been taking place there. Also, from 2011, accepting foreign plays and guests as well. In 2009, the festival was expanded as a children's competition was introduced.

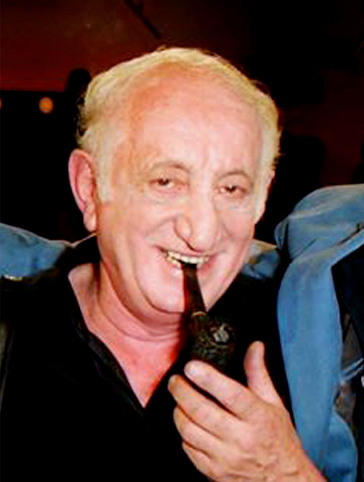
Yaakov Agmon, Theatronetto festival chairman.

The festival's initiator and chairman is Yaakov Agmon. The following is a quote of his in regards to Theatronetto's uniqueness:

"A soloist is like a wizard, standing onstage, and what he gives is all he has to offer. He has nowhere to flee, not to props, items, nor other actors."

— Yaakov Agmon

The festival awards competition-winning artists the "Theatronetto Prize", named after Nisim Azikari and funded by the Tel Aviv Yehoshua Rabbinovich Foundation for the Arts and Matan Project.
