= El Dorado (1963 film) =

- אל דוראדו
- Directed by: Menahem Golan
- Written by: Leo Filler; Menahem Golan; Amatsia Hiuni
- Story by: Yigal Mosenzon (play)
- Produced by: Mordecai Navon
- Starring: Chaim Topol; Gila Almagor
- Cinematography: Nissim Leon
- Edited by: Nellie Gilad
- Music by: Yohanan Zaray
- Production companies: Geva Films; Noah Films
- Release date: 1963
- Running time: 88 minutes
- Country: Israel
- Language: Hebrew

El Dorado (Hebrew: אל דוראדו) is an Israeli 1963 film directed by Menahem Golan. The script was co-written by him, Leo Filler, and Amatsia Hiuni, based on the play by Yigal Mosenzon.

Menahem Golan’s directorial debut is a film adaptation of Yigal Mossinson’s acclaimed novel and play of the same title. The story follows Sherman, a man on trial for murder who is acquitted due to reasonable doubt. Despite his acquittal, the trial leaves a lasting impact on Sherman, leading him to fall in love with his defense attorney’s intelligent daughter. He is even willing to abandon his life of crime for her, including leaving his long-time partner, Margot, a prostitute. However, his attempt to reform is met with skepticism, and the road to redemption proves to be difficult.

The film stars Gila Almagor, Haim Topol, and Shaike Ophir.

== Plot ==
After a man is accused of a crime he did not commit, his lawyer is against taking the case and does nothing to help him. Pressure politically is aiding in finding the man guilty, and he is forced to admit guilt. He then fights to prove his innocence.

== Principal cast ==
Actor	Role
Chaim Topol	Benny Sherman
Gila Almagor	Margo
Shimon Finkel	Lawyer Benyamini
Ori Levy	Sergeant Cohen
Shaike Ophir	Shneider
