= Dana Blankstein Cohen =

Israeli filmmaker

- דנה בלנקשטיין כהן
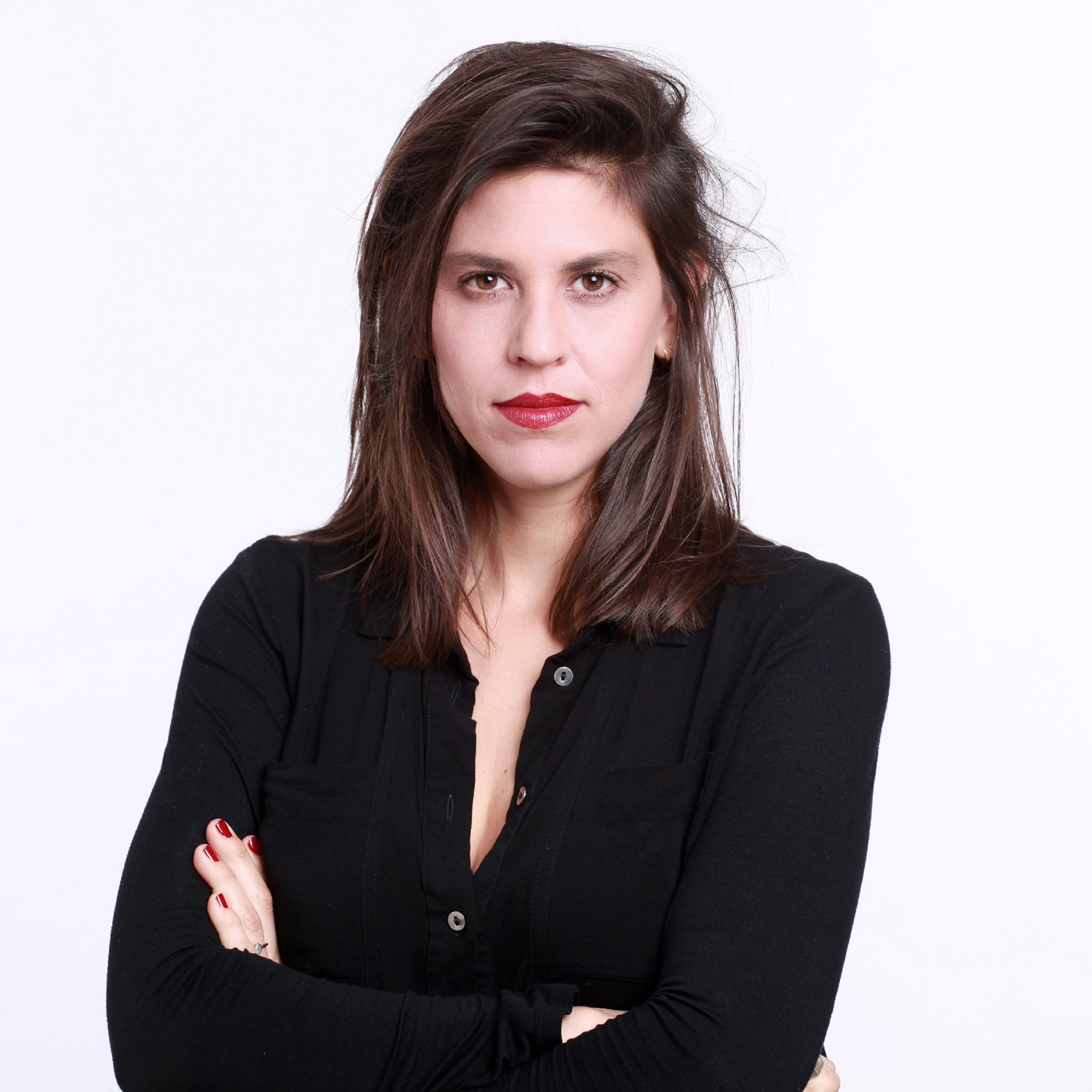
- Dana Blankstein Cohen in 2020
- Born: March 3, 1981 (age 45); Einsiedeln, Switzerland
- Education: Sam Spiegel Film and Television School
- Occupations: Film director; producer; cultural executive
- Organization: Sam Spiegel Film and Television School
- Title: CEO and Executive Director
- Mother: Dedi Baron

Dana Blankstein Cohen (Hebrew: דנה בלנקשטין כהן; born 1981) is an Israeli film director, producer and executive, the CEO and executive director of the Sam Spiegel Film and Television School in Jerusalem since November 2019. Under her leadership, the school has expanded its international collaborations, launched new academic programs, and significantly enhanced its role in fostering diverse and inclusive filmmaking talent. She is a member of the European Film Academy.

== Early life and education ==
Blankstein Cohen was born in Einsiedeln, Switzerland, while her parents were temporarily residing there, and was raised in Israel to theater director Dedi Baron and Dr. Alexander Blankstein. Blankstein Cohen grew up in Tel Aviv-Yafo after her family returned to Israel from Switzerland in 1983. She attended Alon High School in Ramat HaSharon, where she graduated from the school's filmmaking department. Following high school, she served her mandatory military service in the Israel Defense Forces as an education NCO and later as an education officer.

She pursued studies in film and cinema in the Sam Spiegel Film and Television School. During her studies Blankstein Cohen directed two shorts, one of which, Camping, took part in the 2007 Berlinale.

== Career ==
=== Sam Spiegel Film & Television School ===
In 2019, Blankstein Cohen was appointed executive director of the Sam Spiegel Film and Television School. Prior to this role, she served as the director of the Israeli Academy of Film and Television for nearly four years.

Under Blankstein Cohen’s leadership, the Sam Spiegel Film and Television School was recognized among the leading film schools in the world, on The Hollywood Reporter’s list for seven years in a row.

During her tenure, Blankstein Cohen has expanded the school's international presence through the continued development of the International Labs: She oversaw the ten-year celebrations of the International Film Lab, which supports emerging filmmakers from around the world. Established in 2011, the Lab has gained international acclaim for developing debut feature films that premiere at leading film festivals, including Cannes Film Festival, Venice Film Festival, and Berlin International Film Festival. In 2015, the Hungarian film Son of Saul, developed at the Lab, won the Academy Award for Best Foreign Film.

In 2020 Blankstein Cohen spearheaded the signing of an agreement with the Abu Dhabi Film Commission. As part of the Abraham Accords, the Sam Spiegel Film and Television School, along with the Israel Film Fund, were signatories to an agreement fostering cooperation and dialogue.

In 2022, Blankstein Cohen oversaw the move from the school’s historic Talpiot location to the Jerusalem Arts Campus in central Jerusalem. The new facility, a joint initiative of the Jerusalem Municipality and the UJA Federation of New York City, is a seven-story state-of-the-art building featuring three cinemas that function as classrooms during the day and public venues in the evening, including Cinema by Sam Spiegel which is a student-run venture.

== Personal life ==
Blankstein Cohen is married to new media director Yoav Cohen. They reside in Tel Aviv with their two children.
