= Doron Nesher =

Israeli actor, screenwriter, and poet

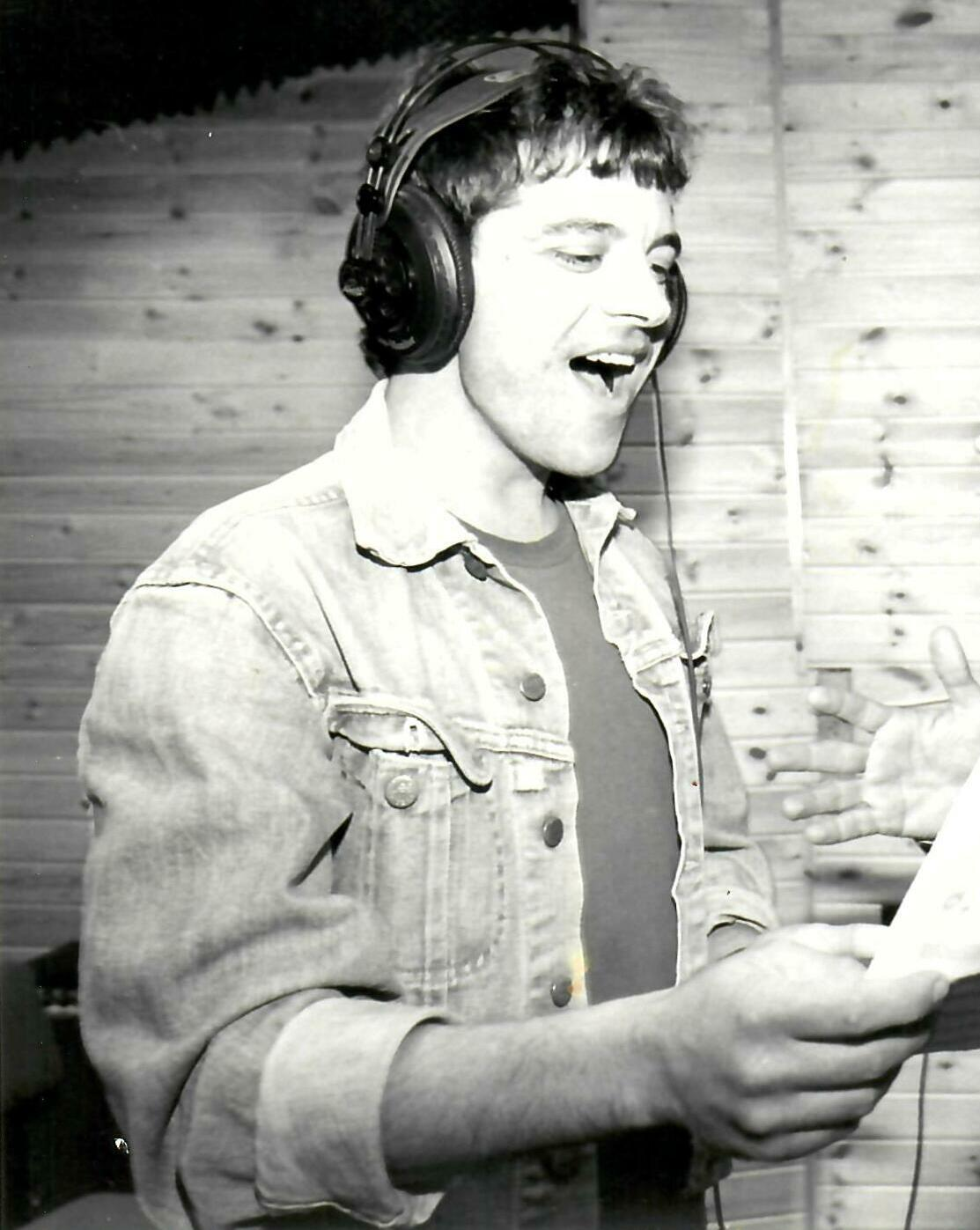
Doron Nester, 1986, recording for Late Summer Blues

Doron Nesher (Hebrew: דורון נשר, born 28 March 1954) an Israeli actor, writer, screenwriter, poet, director, comedian, radio broadcaster and television host.

== Career ==
He wrote the script for the successful 1987 film Late Summer Blues (Hebrew: בלוז לחופש הגדול), about young adults affected by the War of Attrition. He also hosted a children's variety show on Channel 1, called Let's Keep It A Secret. During the 1988 election campaign, he appeared in many adverts, including an advert in support of the Mapam party.

He was among the founding teachers of the Sam Spiegel Film and Television School (1989).

== Selected filmography ==
- 1982: Repeat Dive, as Yoav
- 1984: The Little Drummer Girl, as David
- 1987: Late Summer Blues, screenwriter

== Awards ==
1988: "Silver Menorah" (a predecessor of the Ophir Awards) for Best Screenplay (of Late Summer Blues).
