= Buzz (film) =

- באזז
- Directed by: Eli Cohen
- Written by: Yael Stern-O'Dwyer
- Produced by: Dov Keren (Michlol Productions LTD)
- Starring: Sharon Zur, Tony Tien, Yitzhak Atzmon
- Release date: 1998
- Running time: 87 minutes
- Country: Israel
- Language: Hebrew

Buzz (Hebrew: באזז) is a 1998 Israeli film directed by Eli Cohen, based on a real murder story. It is known for being frequently used and taught in the Israeli education system, as well as the Israel Defense Forces and Israel Prison Service.

== Plot ==
The film is based on a real event in 1994, in which two 14-year-olds—Arbel Aloni and Moshe "Moshiko" Ben-Ivgi—murdered a taxi driver (named Derek Roth). In the film, their names have been changed to Ido Ben Ze'ev and Rafi, respectively. Ido comes from a wealthy family and acts as leader, while Rafi lives with his single mother and follows Ido.

The children start committing crimes such as vandalism and theft. Police officer Ofer Reinitz and school counselor, Naomi know this and work together to put the children in juvenile jail. Ido's father Gidi, a prominent lawyer and personal friend of Ofer's from the army, does not believe the accusations against his son and stops the children from being persecuted on several occasions. After they murder a taxi driver for thrills with an old revolver, both Ido and Rafi are arrested.

== Cast ==
- Sharon Zur as Ofer
- Tony Tien as Ido
- Yitzhak Atzmon as Rafi
- Shmil Ben Ari as Gidi (Ido's father)
- Ahuva Keren as Naomi
- Momo Trelovski as superintendent Rubanenko
- Debbi Besserglick as School Principal

== Screenings ==
The film was screened at the Jerusalem Film Festival and numerous film festivals abroad, including Brussels, Toronto, Palm Beach, Monte Carlo, San Francisco, Boston, Buffalo, St. Louis, Denver and Los Angeles. It was later run frequently on Israel's Channel 2.
