= The Little Drummer Girl (film) =

1984 spy film directed by George Roy Hill

- Theatrical release poster
- Directed by: George Roy Hill
- Screenplay by: Loring Mandel
- Based on: The Little Drummer Girl; 1983 novel by John le Carré
- Produced by: Robert L. Crawford; Patrick Kelley; Dieter Meyer
- Starring: Diane Keaton; Yorgo Voyagis; Klaus Kinski
- Cinematography: Wolfgang Treu
- Edited by: William Reynolds
- Music by: Dave Grusin
- Distributed by: Warner Bros.
- Release date: October 19, 1984
- Running time: 132 minutes
- Country: United States
- Language: English
- Budget: $15 million
- Box office: $7,828,841

The Little Drummer Girl is a 1984 American spy drama film directed by George Roy Hill and adapted from the 1983 novel of the same name by John le Carré. It starred Diane Keaton, Yorgo Voyagis, Klaus Kinski and Thorley Walters. The film received divided reviews among critics.

== Plot ==
Set in Europe and the Middle East, the plot follows the Mossad's clandestine attempt to flush out a PLO bomber named Khalil. To neutralize him, they first kidnap (and later execute) his brother, Michel, who, wearing a ski mask, lectures to audiences about the profound suffering and losses of Palestine under Israeli military occupation.

Charlie, an anti-Zionist American actress working in England, is lured to Greece on the pretense of shooting a wine commercial. There she meets and is seduced by Joseph, who deceives her into believing he is Michel, the masked speaker she briefly met in Dorset. Joseph invites an unsuspecting Charlie for a romantic dinner, after which she is whisked away to an Israeli Mossad safehouse. Waiting there are the Israelis who staged the fake wine commercial. Leader Martin Kurtz claims Israel only wants peace and to end the mutual killing. Their aim is to recruit Charlie to help capture Khalil by posing as Michel's girlfriend. Monitored and manipulated thus, Charlie proves to be smart and capable, acting well in the Mossad's narrative and moving them closer to Khalil. Kurtz's careful staging tricks Palestinian agents into contacting Charlie after she returns to London. Though Joseph tries to dissuade her, saying she has accomplished much for the Mossad team, Charlie wants to continue the mission. After the Palestinians contact her, Charlie arrives in Beirut, Lebanon and is taken to a PLO resistance headquarters. The leader Tayeh, though unsure, sends her on to a desert guerrilla maneuvers training camp.

Tayeh claims that the PLO are not anti-Semitic, but anti-Zionist and advances her to the next assignment. Now a double agent under the Israeli Mossad cover, Charlie acts as Michel's girlfriend. In Germany, she delivers a bomb-laden car to a PLO pick-up point, then returns to London. A Palestinian operative contacts her there. As they set up an exploding briefcase, she recognizes Khalil's bomb signature and correctly identifies him. Charlie delivers the briefcase to the lecture hall where Professor Minkel, a Middle East peace advocate, is speaking. The Mossad quickly replace the bomb with a rigged "safe" explosion to create a false flag event. As Charlie and Khalil's compatriot drive away, the fake bomb is detonated, causing minimal damage. At their countryside hideout, the evening news report casualties to fool Khalil, though he remains wary. Charlie is to signal the Mossad team when Khalil falls asleep, but he remains awake. He notices the unusual silence outdoors and is suspicious of Charlie's portable radio; discovering it contains a tracker, he removes the batteries, disrupting the homing signal. The Mossad team immediately burst in and kill Khalil, leaving Charlie hysterical. Simultaneously, Mossad agents kill other PLO recruiting agents, and Israeli jet bombers destroy the Palestinian training camp, wiping out the guerrilla fighters.

At an Israeli hospital, Charlie is physically unharmed but emotionally devastated, overwhelmed with inner conflicts, betrayal, and regret, having only wanted to help Palestinians and end the killing. Ultimately, she feels that the Mossad exploited her to slaughter every Palestinian she encountered. Eventually, she returns to the London stage but, emotionally frail, walks out during rehearsals. Joseph, who has come to the theater, reveals his real name, Gadi Becker, to her. He says he is finished with killing and that he loves her. Charlie replies she is (emotionally) dead. They walk off together into the night.

== Cast ==
- Diane Keaton as Charlie
- Yorgo Voyagis as Joseph
- Klaus Kinski as Martin Kurtz
- Sami Frey as Khalil
- Michael Cristofer as Tayeh
- Eli Danker as Litvak
- Ben Levine as Dimitri
- Jonathan Sagall as Teddy
- Shlomit Hagoel as Rose
- Juliano Mer as Julio
- Sabi Dorr as Ben
- Doron Nesher as David
- Smadar Brener as Toby
- Shoshi Marciano as Rachel
- Philipp Moog as Aaron
- Bill Nighy as Al
- David Suchet as Mesterbein
- John le Carré as Commander

== Reception ==
The film opened to mixed reviews from critics. People Magazine began their review by stating "Diane Keaton will be a long time living down this film." The New York Times said, "Everybody connected with the film behaves as if he were hanging onto the tail of a tiger and can't let go. They desperately clutch the material but never tame it." James Sanford in the April 9, 2004, Kalamazoo Gazette, referred to the film as an "Underrated thriller with a typically solid Keaton performance ... 3/5".

The Little Drummer Girl currently holds a 50% rating on Rotten Tomatoes based on 10 reviews.

== Home media ==
The film was released on DVD by Warner Bros. Home Entertainment as part of the Warner Archive Collection on June 22, 2009. The Little Drummer Girl was released on Blu-ray on March 26, 2024.
