= Hasimta Theater =

Theater in Jaffa, Israel

Coordinates: 32.0534°N 34.7514°E

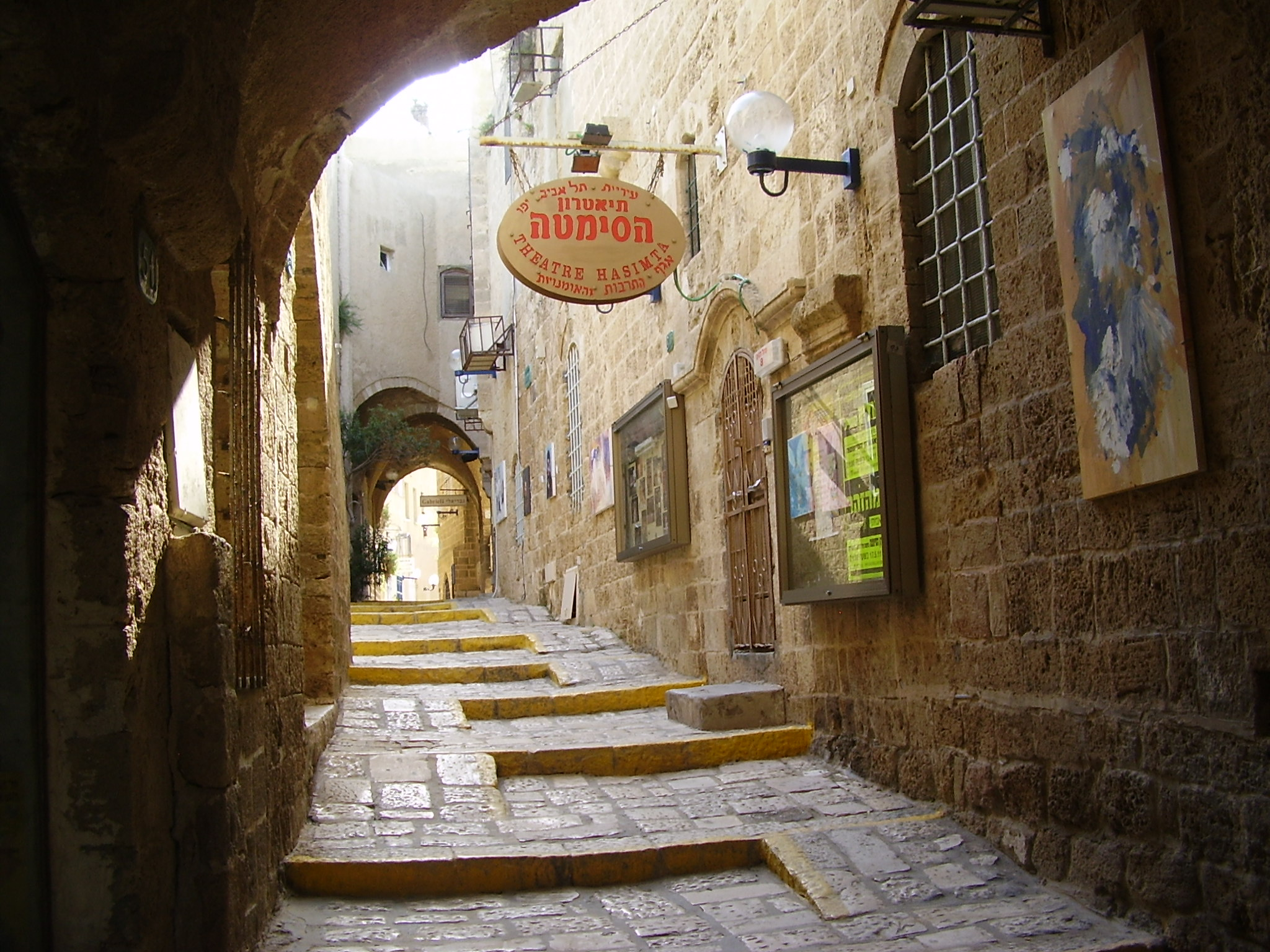
Hasimta Theater

Hasimta Theater (Hebrew: תיאטרון הסימטה, lit. The Alley Theater) is a fringe theater located in the old city of Jaffa, Israel, and known for being one of the oldest fringe theaters in the country.

== History ==
Hasimta Theater has been operating continuously since its foundation in 1981 by Niko Nitai, an actor who also served as the theater's artistic manager. The theater attracts artists who seek to examine theatrical form and expression outside the box. The artistic director and CEO of the theater is Irit Frank.

The theater was founded by Nitai with the help of Tel Aviv Municipality, on the location of former Hasimta Art Gallery. The theater serves as a rehearsal hall in the mornings and a stage for performances in the evenings. Over 54 productions and over 200 plays are presented at the theater per year, and the theater maintains a team of around 135 actors and 96 creators. The place also serves as an exhibition center, and serves as a stage for music and Jazz concerts. "The Alley Bar" also works at the location.

The theater is an exotic venue with several small performance spaces created out of a warren of rooms. The roof terrace, decorated in period Arabic furnishings, overlooks the Old City of Jaffa.

== See also ==
- Culture of Israel
