= Late Summer Blues =

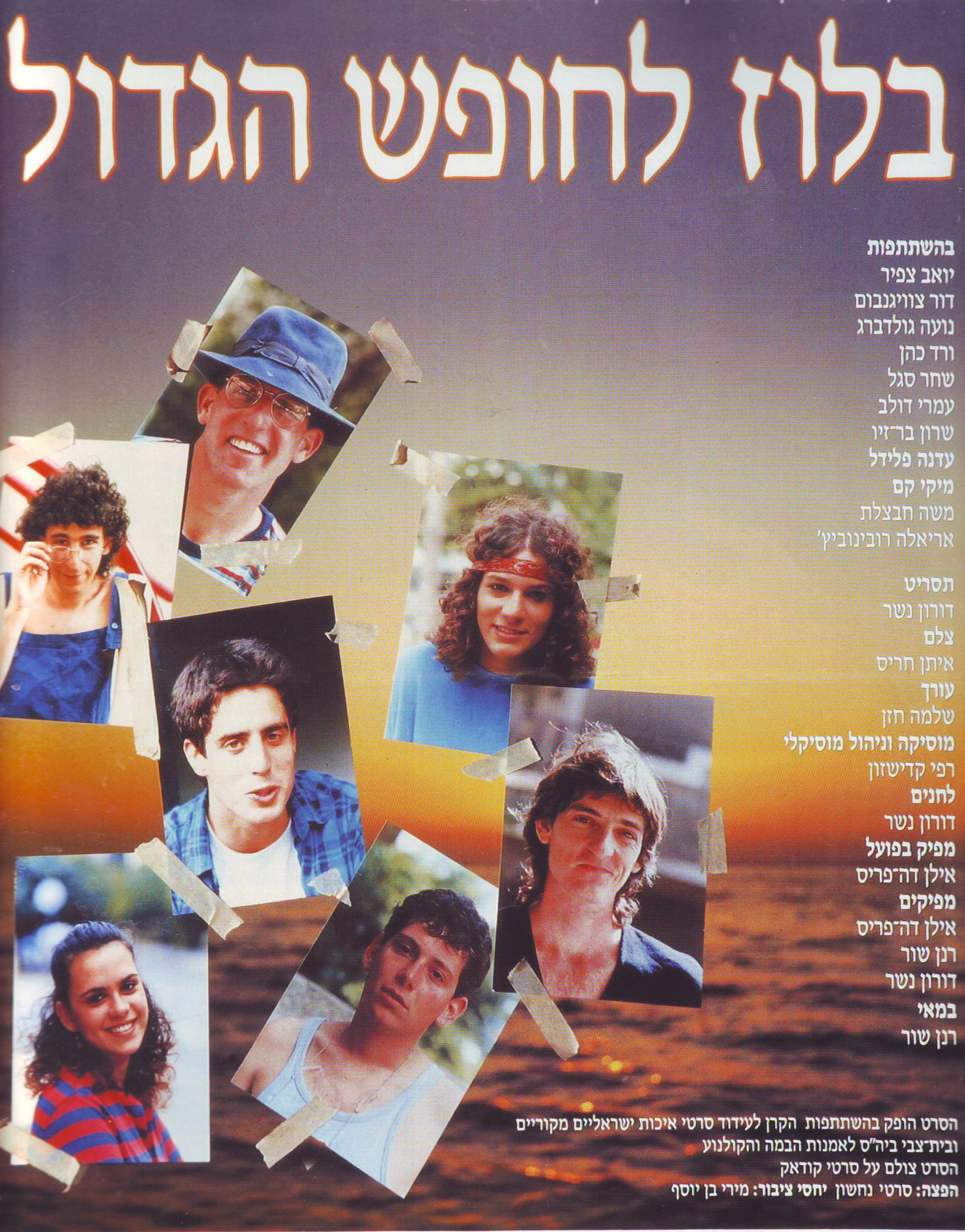
- A poster for the film
- Directed by: Renen Schorr
- Screenplay by: Doron Nesher
- Produced by: Ilan de Vries; Renen Schorr; Doron Nesher
- Starring: Yoav Tzafir; Dor Zweigenbom; Shahar Segal; Noa Goldberg; Omri Dolev
- Cinematography: Eitan Harris
- Music by: Rafi Kadishson
- Release date: 1987
- Running time: 101 minutes
- Country: Israel
- Language: Hebrew

Late Summer Blues (Hebrew: בלוז לחופש הגדול) is an Israeli feature film directed by Renen Schorr, written by Doron Nesher and produced by Ilan de Vries. Initially released in 1987, the film was a box office hit and went on to become an Israeli classic. In 2016, after undergoing extensive digital image and sound restoration, it was rereleased to cinemas, becoming the first Israeli film to do so.

== Plot and characters ==
The film is divided into four episodes, each named after its protagonist:

1. Zvillich – Yossi Zvillich, an innocent, adored friend. The first of his class to be drafted.
2. Aharleh – Aharleh Schechter, a pacifist contemplating if to draft or draft-dodge. He protests by spraying anti-war graffiti around the city.
3. Mossi – Mossi Shoval, a gifted musician whose high physical profile requires he be drafted to combat service, although he dreams of serving in a military variety group.
4. Margo – Ehud "Margo" Margolis, a diabetic who due to his illness cannot serve in the military. He documents the group with his Super 8 camera.

== Cast ==
Actor	Role
Yoav Tsafir	Mossi
Dor Zweigenbom	Araleh
Shahar Segal	Margo
Edna Fliedel	Principal
Miki Kam	Secretary
Noa Goldberg	Naomi
Sharon Bar-Ziv	Kobi
Vered Cohen	Shosh
Omri Dolev	Zvillich
Ada Ben-Nahum	Mossi's mother
Moshe Havazelet	Mossi's father
Maxi Nesher	Strikovsky
Ariela Rubinovitz	Hava Carmeli
Amit Gazit	Lieutenant Colonel Arbel
Slava Chaplin	Army doctor

== Development and production ==
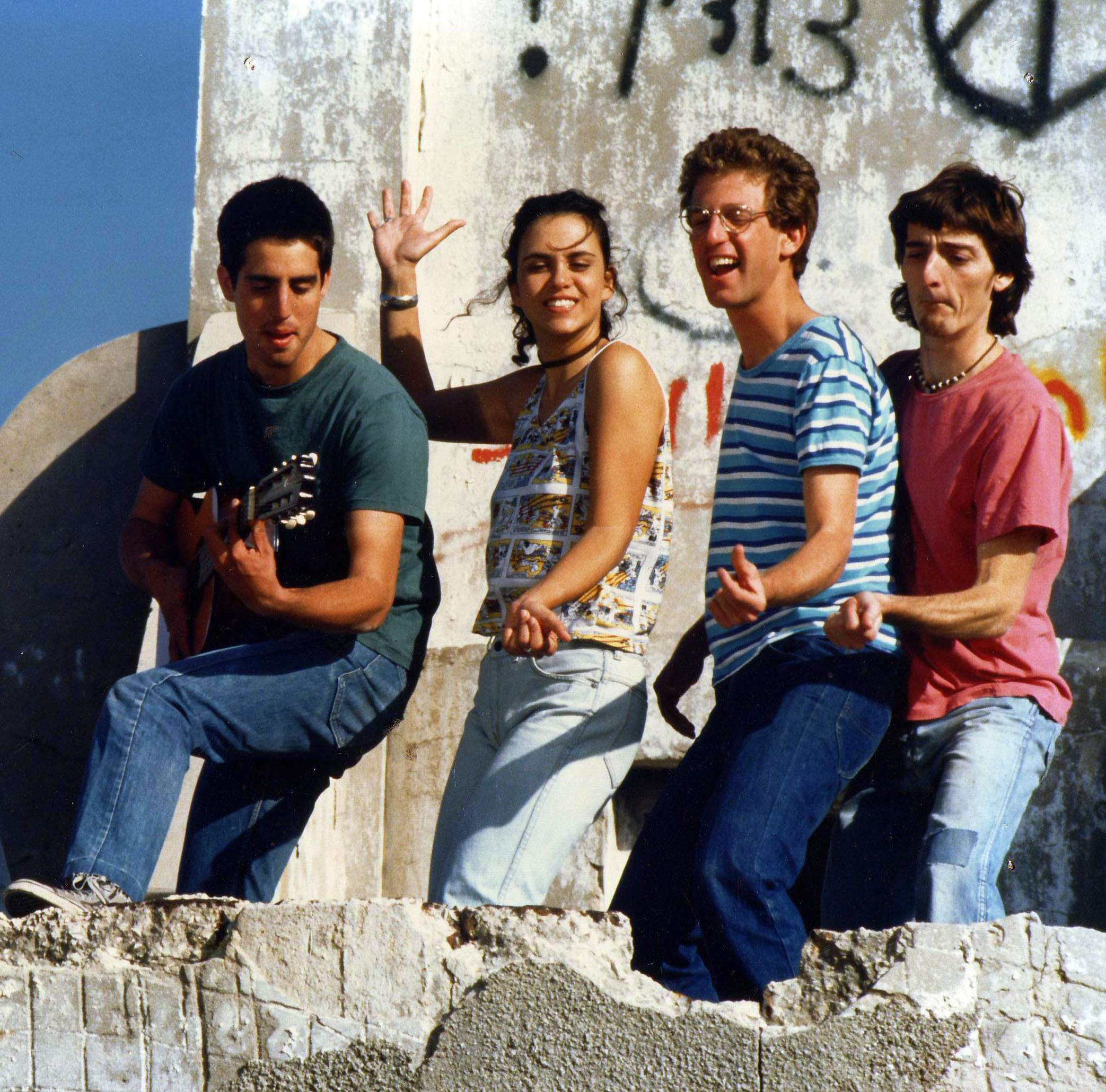
A scene from the film

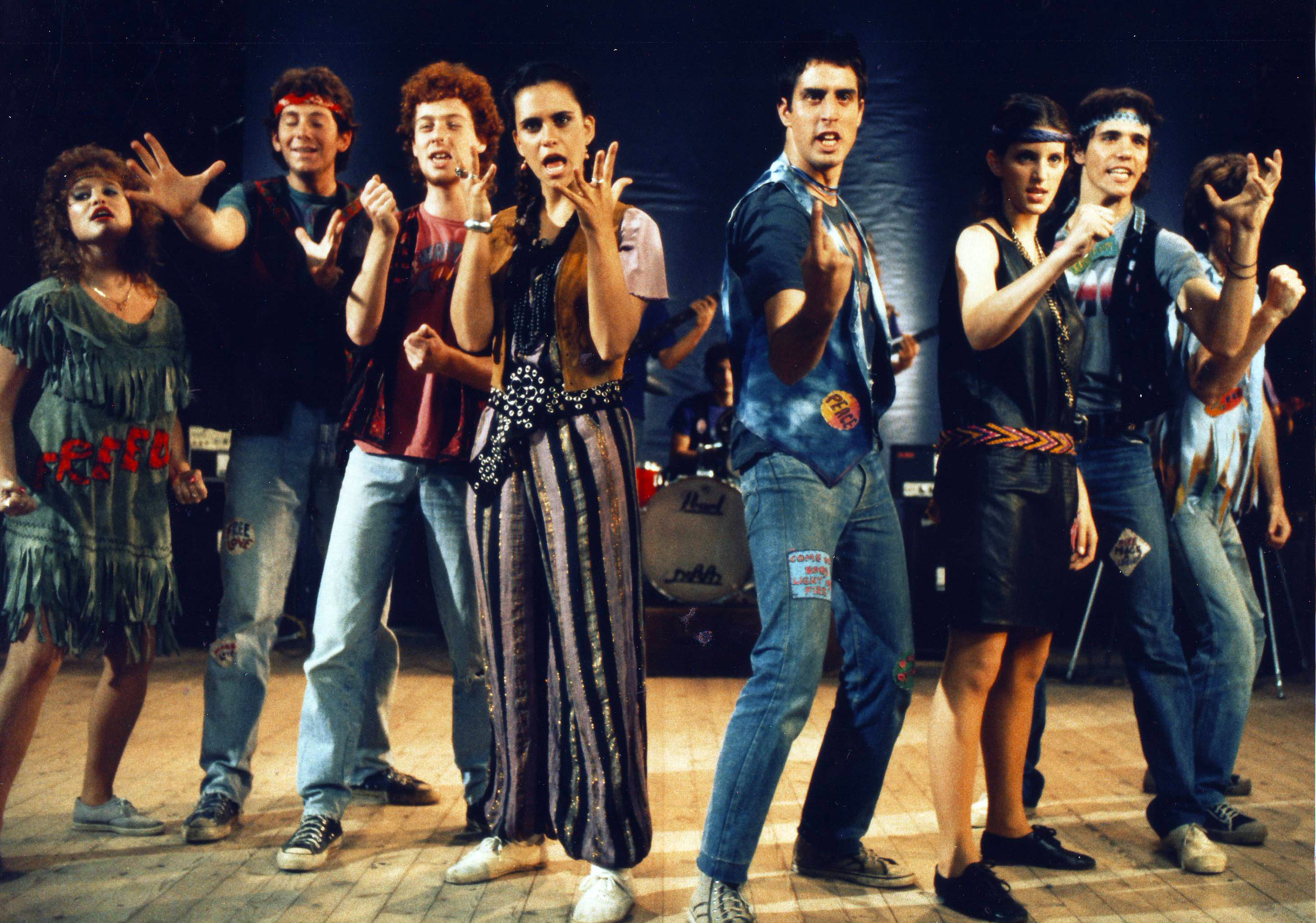
A scene from the film

Renen Schorr first wrote the film's outline in 1976, while still a student at Tel Aviv University's film department. It was based on his experiences with his own class, who wrote the famous "Senior's Letter" in Tel Aviv and Jerusalem in 1970, during the War of Attrition. The letter, addressed to Prime Minister Golda Meir, stated that the class would willingly draft (military service is mandatory in Israel), but only under the condition that the government will commit to reach peace as soon as possible and by all means necessary. By writing this letter, they in effect publicly doubted the government's commitment to peace. This was the first time an organized group of high school seniors in Israel stood up and asked the government questions, instead of being conformists like their parents..

Two years later, Doron Nesher, then a young Israeli actor who had already taken part in George Roy Hill's The Little Drummer Girl, joined Schorr in writing the screenplay. Nesher and Schorr wrote seven drafts between 1978 and 1985, all rejected by the Israel Film Fund. Parallel to that, they weren't able to raise funds from private investors, as the screenplay was much different than the other films depicting youth produced in Israel at the time. Pacifist protagonists and political discussions were considered "box office poison". Moreover, the Ministry of Industry and Commerce, who financed the grants for Israeli cinema at the time, refused to grant basic support to the film, implying that it was "anti-Israeli and catering to the PLO's interests."

In 1985, the Israel Film Fund, supported by the Ministry of Education and Culture, finally approved the film's production. That winter, the film began shooting with a low budget of $150,000, and was the first full-length film for most of the cast and crew.

While casting, Schorr searched for actors with a "typical" Israeli look, and wasn't afraid to cast unknown actors and "non-actors", hoping to create a "fuller" Israeli experience. A large part of the film's concept was connecting with Israeli and Tel Avivian culture, out of pride of it, and despite commercial considerations. The music and songs that accompany the film were chosen due to their iconic status in Israeli culture, each triggering emotions and thoughts deep in Israel's collective psyche.

During rehearsals, to connect the young cast to the 1960s feeling of "changing the world", Schorr and Nesher shared and studied a large collection of records (Bob Dylan, Leonard Cohen, Jimi Hendrix, The Doors, Janis Joplin), books (by Herbert Marcuse, Viktor Frankl and more) and films (Rebel Without a Cause, Hair, The Deer Hunter Alice's Restaurant, Breaking Away and more) with them.

== Release and reception ==
The film premiered as the 1987 Jerusalem Film Festival's opening film, the first Israeli film to do so. The film was released commercially immediately afterwards, gaining both critical and commercial success, eventually screening to over 250,000 cinemagoers. Distributed by Kino International and Janus Films, the film was released commercially in the United States and Canada, a rare achievement for an Israeli film at the time.

The film has been included on many critics' and public polls as one of the best Israeli films of all time.

New York Times Jerusalem bureau Chief Thomas Friedman was present at the premiere and subsequently wrote the cover story in the Arts & Leisure section of the Times on August 9, 1987. "The film ostensibly is about seven Israeli 18-year-olds during their summer break between high school graduation and induction into the army. Although the movie takes place in 1970, it could have been about last summer – and that is the point. For Israeli 18-year-olds nothing has changed," he wrote.

== Festivals and awards ==
The film won the 1988 "Silver Menorah" (a predecessor of the Ophir Awards) for Best Film, Best Screenplay (Doron Nesher) and Best Musical Score. In addition, the film won Best Film at the 1988 Israeli Film Festival both in New York and Los Angeles.

The film premiered internationally in competition at the 1987 Montreal International Film Festival. It was screened at over 30 international film festivals, including: Toronto, Moscow, Chicago, Los Angeles, Hong Kong, Dublin, Vienna, Vancouver and more.

== Stage musical adaptation ==
In 2023, the Beit Lessin Theater in Tel Aviv premiered a stage adaptation of Late Summer Blues written by Oren Yaacobi, directed by Yotam Kushnir, with lyrics by Elai Botner and Oren Yaacobi and score by Elai Botner and Amir Lekner.
