= Yaakov Agmon =

Israeli theatre producer (1929–2020)

- יעקב אגמון
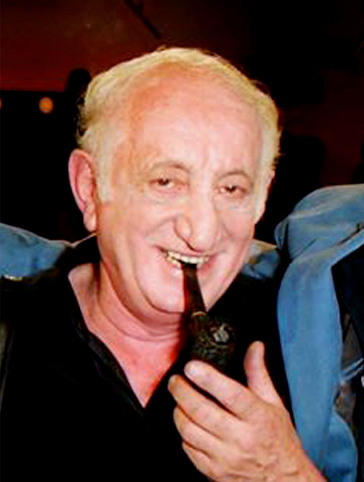
- Agmon in the early 1990s
- Born: Yankale Agmon; 24 June 1929; Sokołów Podlaski, Second Polish Republic
- Died: 16 December 2020 (aged 91); Ramat Gan, Israel
- Occupations: Theater producer; manager; director
- Years active: 1956–2020
- Spouse: Gila Almagor (m. 1963)
- Children: 2

Yaakov Agmon (Hebrew: יעקב אגמון; 24 June 1929 – 16 December 2020) was an Israeli theater producer, manager, and director.

== Biography ==
Yaakov Agmon was born in Poland and moved to Mandatory Palestine with his family in 1933 at age four. He grew up in Tel Aviv and was a member of the Hashomer Hatzair youth movement. He later moved to Kibbutz Harel, where he was involved with the planning and organization of events for the kibbutz movement. He was married to the actress Gila Almagor. Agmon died from pneumonia in the Sheba Medical Center in Ramat Gan on December 16, 2020, at the age of 91.

== Theater and media career ==
Between 1956 and 1958, Agmon served as the director of the youth section in the United Jewish Appeal and also as a columnist and the secretary of the Rimon weekly publication. In 1958, after a reorganization of the Cameri Theatre, Agmon was appointed general director, a post he held for the next four years. In 1962 Agmon went to study in the United States and served as an advisor for the America Israel Cultural Foundation.

In 1964, Agmon established the Bimot Theatre. In 1978, he founded Beit Lessin Theater. From 1968, Agmon hosted a weekly radio talk show, She'elot Ishiyot, on Israel Army Radio.

In 1995, Agmon was appointed general and artistic director of the Habima Theatre, in order to pull the theatre out of a financial crisis. He retired from the position in 2005, failing to achieve this goal, after much criticism. In 2010, Agmon was appointed general manager of the Arabic–Hebrew theater of Jaffa.

== Death ==
Agmon died in 2020 aged 91 from Covid-19.

== Awards and recognition ==
In 2007, Agmon was awarded the Israeli Theater Award for his life's work.
