= Sam Spiegel Film and Television School =

Film school in Jerusalem, Israel

- בית הספר סם שפיגל לקולנוע ולטלוויזיה
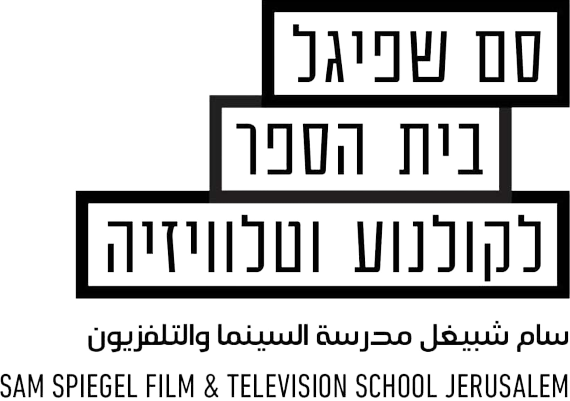

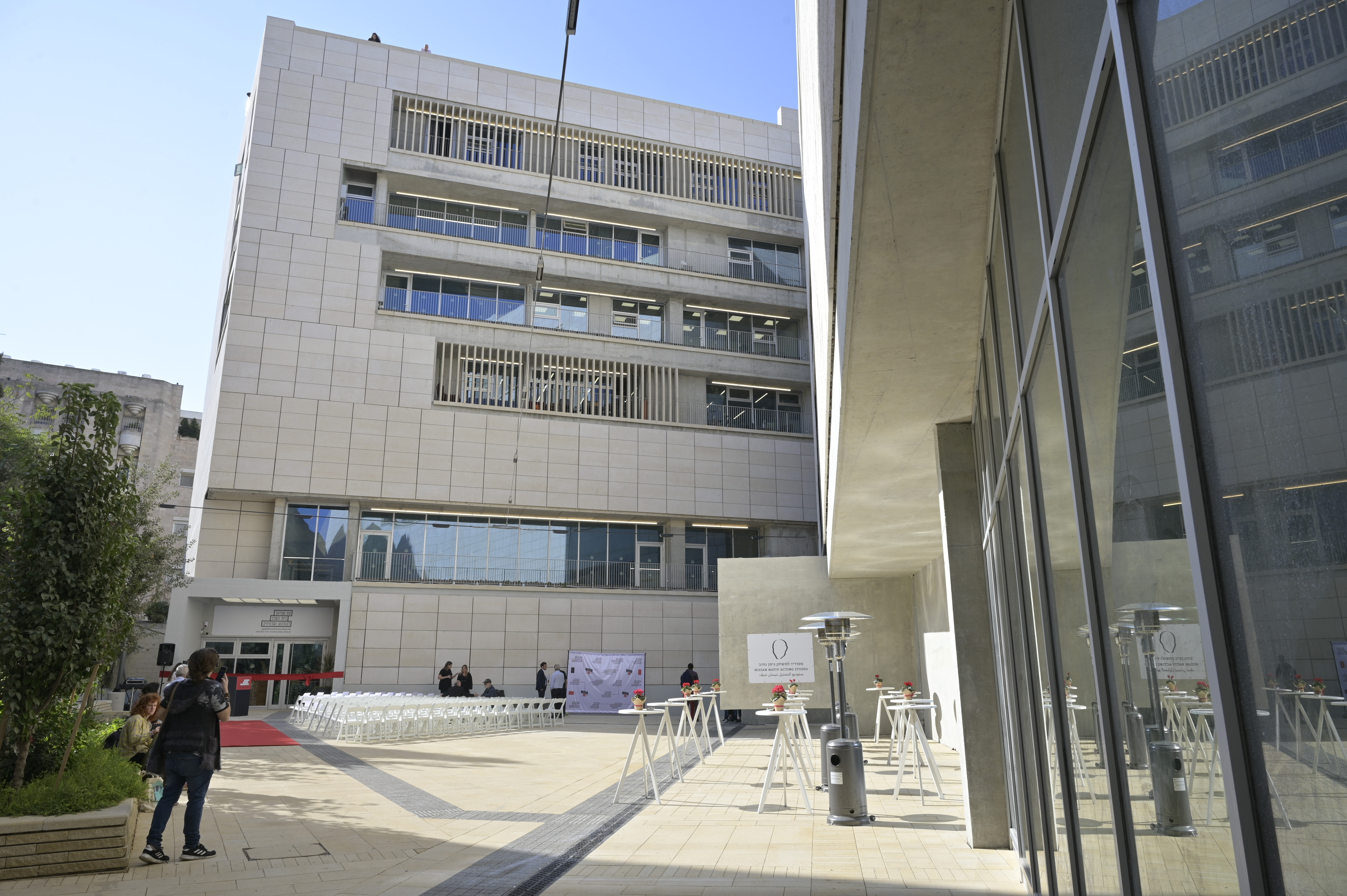

Location
- Menora St. 3, Jerusalem, Israel; Gerard Behar Center

Information
- School type: Film school
- Established: 1989
- Founder: Ministry of Education; Jerusalem Foundation; Renen Schorr (founding prinvipal)
- Principal: Dana Blankstein Cohen
- Years offered: 4
- Language: Hebrew
- Campus type: Urban
- Website: https://www.eng.jsfs.co.il/

The Sam Spiegel Film and Television School (Hebrew: בית הספר סם שפיגל לקולנוע ולטלוויזיה) is a film and television school in Jerusalem, Israel that was founded in 1989 as the Jerusalem School of Film. It was renamed in honor of Hollywood producer Sam Spiegel in 1996 with the acquisition of his estate.

As of August 2024. the school’s executive director is Dana Blankstein Cohen.

In September 2022 the school moved from its historic location in the Talpiot neighborhood to the new Jerusalem Arts Campus in central Jerusalem.

== History ==
In 1988, a student protest took place at the film department of the Beit Zvi School of Art in Ramat Gan, then the sole film school supported by the state. Charging that Beit Zvi School of Art gave preference to the acting track, the film students demanded independence. The Education and Culture Minister at the time, President Yitzhak Navon established a public inquiry that supported their claims. He then decided to create a new independent school for film and television, the first of its kind in Israel.

The mayor of Jerusalem, Teddy Kollek, and Ruth Cheshin, president of the Jerusalem Foundation, committed to match government funding. In July 1989, Ruth Cheshin charged film director Renen Schorr with the task of making this new school a reality. The school opened in Jerusalem in November 1989.

The first teachers of the school included: Moti Kirschenbaum, Dan Wolman, Eli Cohen, Daniel Wachsmann, Orna Ben-Dor Niv, Ayelet Menahemi, and Renen Schorr — teachers directing and acting; Doron Nesher, Batya Gur, Kobi Niv, Meir Shalev and David Schütz teachers of scriptwriting; Yaakov Eisenmann teacher of photography; Asher Tlalim editing; Hagai Pinsker, Uri Klein, Nissim Kalderon and Aner Preminger teachers of reviewing and theory.

It was renamed in honor of Hollywood producer Sam Spiegel in 1996, with the support of the Sam Spiegel Estate. The school has been a member of international film and television association CILECT since 2001. In November 2019 the board of directors appointed Dana Blankstein Cohen to head the school. In June 2021 Shir Shoshani was appointed deputy school director & head of the film and television department.

In September 2022 the school moved from its historic location in the Talpiot neighborhood to the new Jerusalem Arts Campus in central Jerusalem. The new building is a seven-story state-of-the-art building that includes a sound stage, 21 editing suites and three cinemas that are open to the public.

=== Notable alumni ===
- Ra'anan Alexandrowicz (born1969) – Documentary filmmaker and screenwriter. Winner of the World Cinema Grand Jury Prize: Documentary at the Sundance Film Festival.
- Nir Bergman (born 1969) – Director and screenwriter. Winner of the Tokyo Grand Prix at the Tokyo International Film Festival.
- Mihal Brezis – Director. Nominated for a 2015 Academy Award for Best Live Action Short Film.
- Rama Burshtein (born 1967) – Filmmaker, director, and screenwriter. Winner of the Venice Film Festival Volpi Cup.
- Amichai Chasson (born1987) – Poet, film director, and curator. Winner of the Prime Minister's Prize for Hebrew Literary Works.
- Yehonatan Indursky (born 1984) – Television creator, director, and writer. Winner of multiple Israeli Television Academy Awards.
- Tamar Kay – Documentary filmmaker. Nominated for a 2017 Academy Award for Best Documentary (Short Subject).
- Yaelle Kayam (born 1979) – Director and screenwriter.
- Nadav Lapid (born 1975) – Screenwriter and director. Winner of the Golden Bear at the Berlin International Film Festival and the Jury Prize at the Cannes Film Festival.
- Talya Lavie (born 1978) – Director and screenwriter. Winner of the Nora Ephron Prize and Best Narrative Feature at the Tribeca Film Festival.
- Noah Stollman (born c. 1970s) – Screenwriter and television creator. Winner of multiple Israeli Television Academy Awards.

== Accolades ==
The school has been the subject of some 190 tributes and retrospectives in 55 countries at international festivals, including the Museum of Modern Art in New York (1996), the Rotterdam Festival (1997), the Havana Festival (1999), the Moscow Festival (1999), the Valladolid Film Festival (Spain, 2000), FIPA Festival - Biarritz (France, 2004) the Berlin International Film Festival (2004, 2019), the Hamptons Festival (2005) and the Clermont-Ferrand International Short Film Festival in France (2005), and Sarajevo Film Festival (2008). In 2016 the Faculty of Asian and Middle Eastern Studies at University of Cambridge held a tribute to the school.

The school's films have won 420 international and local prizes, including twice the First Prize at the Cannes Film Festival. In 2008 Anthem, by Elad Keidan was awarded First Prize in the Student Film competition at the Cinéfondation section. This marked the first ever such win by an Israeli student film in Cannes, and in 2015 Or Sinai won for her film Anna.

In 2023 the school's documentary “Before Bedtime” took first place in the CILECT Prize.

In August 2023 the school was listed on the Hollywood Reporter’s list of 15 best global film schools.

== Education ==
The students are studying in two tracks: a four-year curriculum covering all aspects of filmmaking such as directing, editing, producing, and cinematography, in addition to theoretical studies, and a two-year track for screenwriters, including a specialization in writing for television.

In February 2022 a preparatory program for Arabic speakers from East Jerusalem was opened. The curriculum includes Hebrew language, general art and cultural concepts as well as introductory film classes. The second edition of the program began in June 2023.

== Initiatives ==
The Sam Spiegel International Film Lab was launched in December 2011, with the goal of fostering the development and production of full-length feature films by some of the world’s most promising young talents. The Lab became the third film lab of its kind in the world, along with The Sundance Institute and The TorinoFilmLab in Italy. In 2015, the lab developed the Academy Award-winning film Son of Saul by László Nemes. In May 2023 the Lab celebrated its first decade and recognized its alumni including Nadav Lapid, whose The Kindergarten Teacher (2014 film) was developed at the 1st edition of the Lab and went on to a remake starring Maggie Gyllenhaal; Antoneta Alamat Kusijanović 2021 Caméra d'Or winner for the Lab developed Murina (film); and Abner Benaim whose Lab developed Plaza Catedral was Panama’s entry to the Oscars in 2021. The director of the Labs is Mor Eldar.

In 2021 the Sam Spiegel Series Lab was launched in partnership with Netflix and Paramount Pictures. The Series Lab accepts eight Israeli projects who work over a period of six months with mentors, including Hagai Levi, and then travel to Los Angeles for presentation to the US industry. The second edition of the Series Lab began in May 2023.
