= Shir Shoshani =

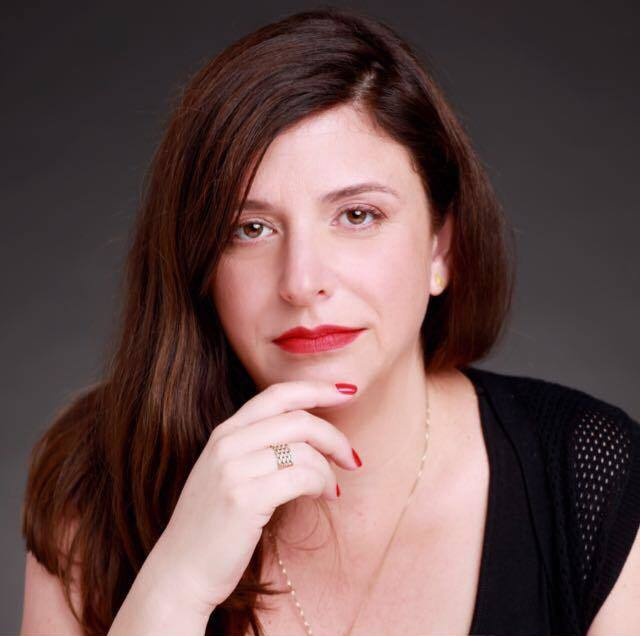
- Shir Shoshani, 2021
- Born: 26 January 1979 (age 47); Ramat HaSharon, Israel
- Occupations: First Assistant Director; producer

Shir Shoshani (born January 26, 1979) is deputy school director, head of the film and television department at the Jerusalem Sam Spiegel Film and Television School, a film lecturer and first AD in the Israeli film industry.

== Biography ==
Born in Ramat HaSharon in 1979, her father, Dr. Shimshon Shoshani was the CEO of the Ministry of Education in Israel, the Jewish Agency and "Taglit- Birthright Israel". Her mother, Dr. Yael Shoshani is a psychologist and served as the head of the psychological association.

Shoshani lives in Tel Aviv with her son.

== Early life and education ==
Shoshani is a graduate of Alon High School, Ramat Hasharon. Her student film “Remodeling” (1996), starring Dan Muggia won the Van Leer Award at the Jerusalem Film Festival. Shoshani was a Member of the C.I.S.V charitable, independent, non-political, volunteer organization which promotes peace education and cross cultural friendship.

Shoshani served in the IDF and won a citation for excellence.

She completed her studies at the Jerusalem Sam Spiegel Film and Television School in 2008 where she won the America-Israel Cultural Foundation Award for her film “Under Water” and the David Shapira award for student excellence.

== Career ==
Shoshani served as executive producer at LiberMedia from 1999 to 2000 and then as the executive producer for promos at Keshet Media Group (2000–2003) working under Muli Segev and Shai Avivi.

Between 2006 and 2016, Shoshani worked as first AD on numerous Israeli and international Film and TV Productions, including the Golden Lion winner "Lebanon” (Samuel Maoz, 2009); Cannes Film Festival best screenplay winner “Footnote (film)” (Joseph Cedar, 2011); and Natalie Portman’s directorial debut “A Tale of Love and Darkness (film) (2015). Shoshani had leading Main roles also on the Sony International series “Absentia (TV series)" (2019) and Netflix’s “[1]Hit and Run” (2020).

Over the years, Shoshani has been a mentor to tens of student films and served in 2015 as the head of the producers’ track at the Jerusalem Sam Spiegel Film and Television School. Shoshani taught professional set production at the Steve Tisch Department of Film at Tel Aviv University (2018–2021).

In June 2021, she was appointed Deputy School Director, Head of the film and television department at the Jerusalem Sam Spiegel Film and Television School.

== Filmography ==
Year	Title	Position	Genre & Notes
2020/21	“Hit & Run (TV series)” – season 1	H&S Manager	Series Netflix
2019	“Absentia (TV series)” – season 3	Cast Supervisor	Sony Pictures Television Networks
2016	“Absentia (TV series)” – season 1	First Assistant Director	Sony Pictures Television Networks
2016	“Beauty &The Baker” (“Lehiyot ita”) – season 2	First Assistant Director	TV series – Keshet Broadcasting
2015	Norman	First Assistant Director	Feature Film. Director: Joseph Cedar
2014	False Flag (TV series) ("kfulim") – season 1	First Assistant Director	TV series – Keshet Broadcasting
2014	A Tale of Love and Darkness (film)	First Assistant Director	Feature Film. Director: Natalie Portman
2013	“Hakafot”	First Assistant Director	Feature Film
2012	Farewell, Baghdad" ("Mafriah Ha-Yonim")	First Assistant Director	Feature Film
2012	"A Place in Heaven" ("Makom Be Gan Eden")	First Assistant Director	Feature Film
2011	"Funny World" ("Haolam Matshik")	First Assistant Director	Feature Film
2011	"Footnote (film) ("Hearat Shulayim")	First Assistant Director	Feature Film. Director: Joseph Cedar DP
2010	"The Debt" The Debt (2010 film)	1st AD Israeli crew	Feature Film. Director: John Madden
2009	"Intimate Grammar" ("Hadikduk Hapnimi")	First Assistant Director	Feature Film
2009	"Mary Lou" ("Tamid oto Chalom")	First Assistant Director	TV series
2008	"Jaffa" ("Kalat Hayam")	First Assistant Director	Feature Film
2008	Pillars of Smoke (Timrot Ashan) – season 1	First Assistant Director	TV series
2007	"Revivre" ("Lichyot Mechadash")	First Assistant Director	Feature Film
2007	Lebanon (film)	First Assistant Director	Feature Film – Director: Samuel Maoz
2007	"Disengagement" ("Hitnatkut")	Second Assistant Director	Feature Film – Director: Amos Gitai
2006	"Le Syndrome de Jerusalem" ("Chomer Lemachshava")	Second Assistant Director	Feature Film
