= Aviya's Summer =

- Directed by: Eli Cohen
- Written by: Gila Almagor; Eli Cohen
- Produced by: Gila Almagor; Eitan Evan
- Starring: Gila Almagor; Kaipo Cohen
- Cinematography: David Gurfinkel
- Edited by: Tova Neeman
- Release date: July 15, 1988
- Running time: 95 minutes
- Country: Israel
- Languages: Hebrew; Yiddish

Aviya's Summer (Hebrew: הקיץ של אביה; translit. Ha-Kayitz Shel Aviya) is a Hebrew-language book that became a bestseller. The 1985 autobiographical novel by theater actress Gila Almagor was made into a film released in 1988. The 96-minute film acts as a memoir of Almagor's childhood and provides insights into Israeli society in the early post-state period. Directed by Eli Cohen, the film was shot on location in Kfar Avraham, Petach Tikvah, Israel.

== Plot ==
Aviya's Summer is set in the summer of 1951, in the newly established state of Israel. The film chronicles the life of ten-year-old Aviya, whose warm, loving, and fiercely independent mother, Henya (played by Almagor herself), is tortured by periodic mental breakdowns. Henya's psychological and emotional scars stem from her horrid experience during the Holocaust, and from the loss of her husband during the war. Henya was once considered to be a beautiful and courageous partisan fighter, yet now she is constantly mocked by native Israelis for her erratic behavior. She walks the thin line between sanity and madness, attempting to forge a life for herself and her daughter in the new realities of Israel.

Aviya is a bright girl with a vivid imagination, yet she is mocked by her peers. Her relationship with her mother is complex, at times affectionate, but also fragile. Aviya fantasizes that if she could only find her father, all her/her mother's problems would cease and her family would be whole again. Aviya's wild imagination regarding her quest to find her father leads to the climax of the film. The film ends with Aviya coming to terms with the realities of her life and reaching a maturity beyond her years.

== Awards ==
The film has been the recipient of many Israeli prizes as well as various international awards, including a Silver Bear Award for outstanding artistic contribution at the 39th Berlin International Film Festival, Best Foreign Film – San Remo Festival, and Best Director/Best Actress – Silver Menorah Award. The film was selected as the Israeli entry for the Best Foreign Language Film at the 61st Academy Awards, but was not accepted as a nominee.

== Cast ==
- Gila Almagor – Henya Aleksandrowicz
- Kaipo Cohen – Aviya Aleksandrowicz
- Marina Rosetti – Esther/Helena "Lena" Gantz
- Eli Cohen – Max Gantz
- Avital Dicker – Maya Abramson

== Sequel ==
The 1994 film Under the Domim Tree is a sequel to Aviya's Summer, both films directed by Eli Cohen and both being adaptions of books written by Gila Almagor.

== See also ==
- List of submissions to the 61st Academy Awards for Best Foreign Language Film
- List of Israeli submissions for the Academy Award for Best Foreign Language Film
