= Eli Cohen (actor) =

Israeli actor

- אלי כהן
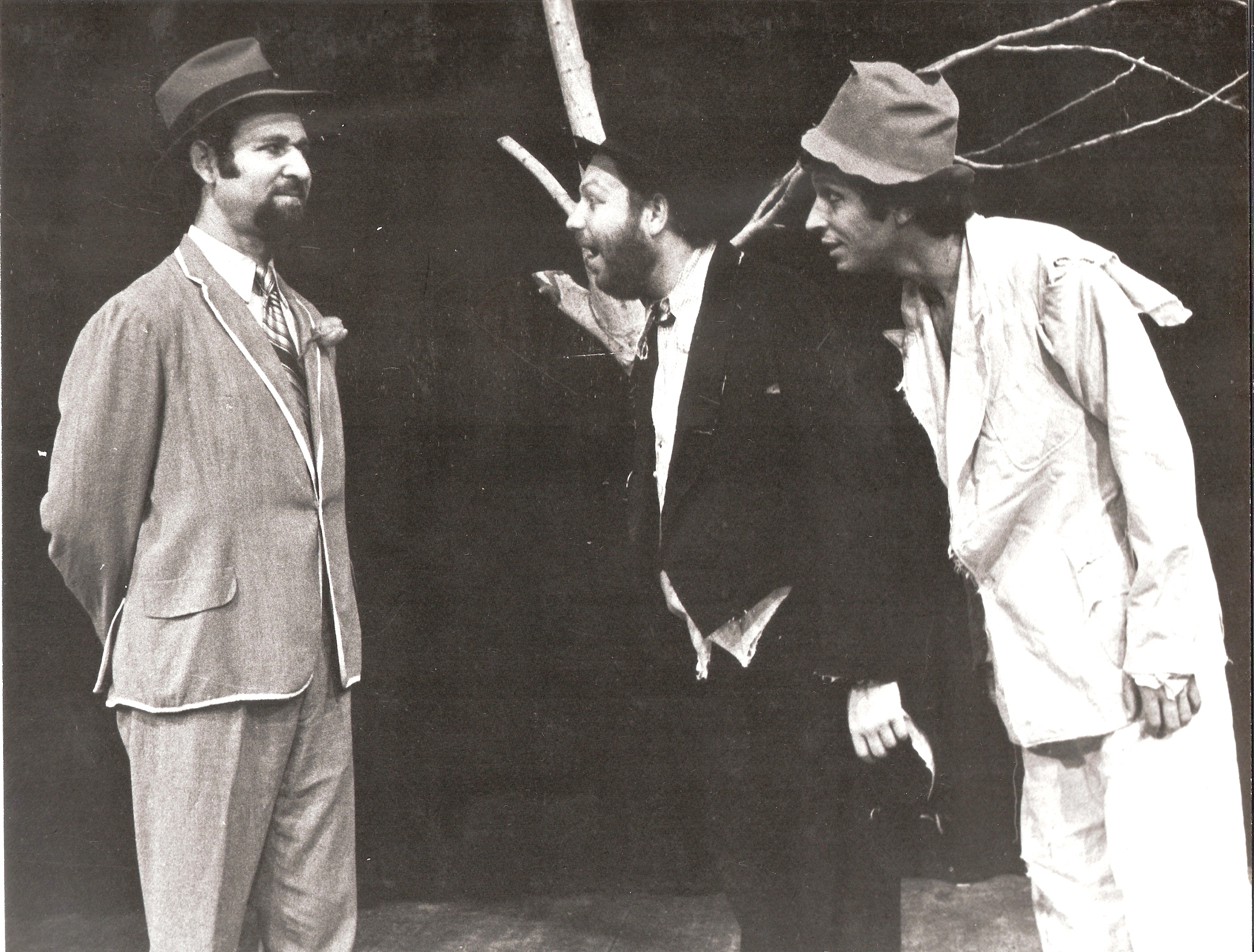
- Cohen (right) performing on stage in 1973
- Born: 18 December 1940 (age 85); Hadera, Mandate for Palestine (now Israel)
- Occupations: Actor, film director
- Years active: 1967–2003

Eli Cohen (Hebrew: אלי כהן; born 18 December 1940) is an Israeli actor and film director. In 1989 his film Summer of Aviya won the Silver Bear Award from the 39th Berlin International Film Festival. Six years later, his film Under the Domim Tree was screened in the Un Certain Regard section at the 1995 Cannes Film Festival.

== Selected filmography ==
=== Director ===
- Ricochets (Shtei Etzbaot Mi'Tzidon) (1986)
- Summer of Aviya (1989)
- The Quarrel (1991)
- Under the Domim Tree (1994)
- Hora 79 (2013)

=== Actor ===
- Neither by Day Nor by Night (1972)
- Jesus (1979)
- Buzz (1998)
