= Gila Almagor =

Israeli actress, film star, and author

- גילה אלמגור
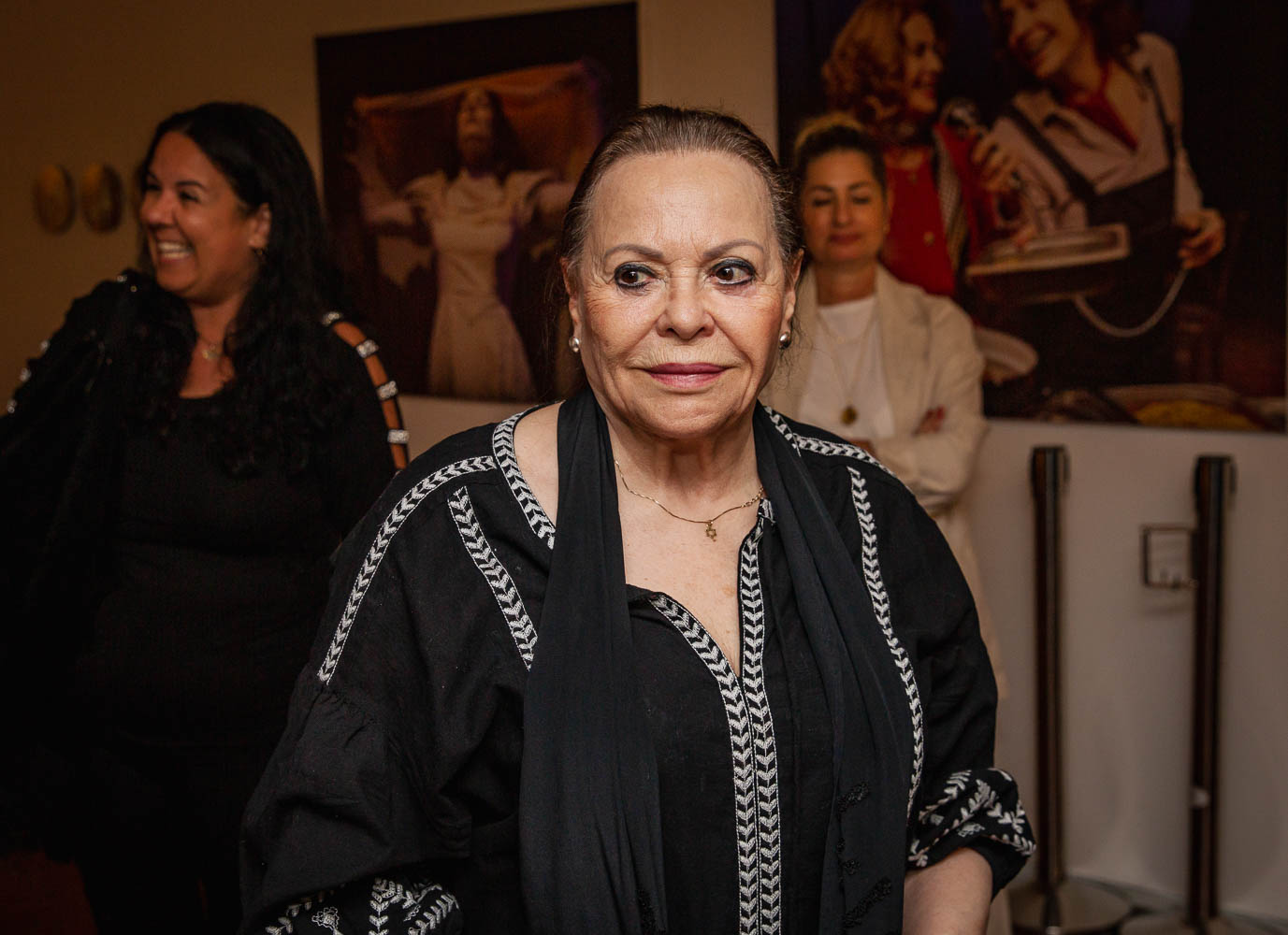
- Almagor in 2022
- Born: 22 July 1939 (age 87); Petah Tikva, Mandatory Palestine
- Occupations: Actress; novelist
- Spouse: Yaakov Agmon (m. 1963; died 2020)
- Children: 2

Gila Almagor Agmon (Hebrew: גילה אלמגור אגמון; born Gila Alexandrowitz; 22 July 1939) is an Israeli actress and author. In Israel, she is known as "queen of the Israeli cinema and theatre".

== Biography ==
Gila Alexandrowitz (Almagor) was born in Petah Tikva to Jewish emigrant parents from Europe. Her father Max Alexandrowitz was born in Germany to Polish-Jewish parents. was killed by an Arab sniper while working as a policeman in Haifa four months before she was born. Her mother Chaya was from a Polish Orthodox Jewish family. Almagor grew up caring for her mother, who was slowly losing her sanity after realising that all her family in Europe had been murdered in the Holocaust. When her mother was institutionalized in 1954, Almagor was sent to Hadassim youth village.

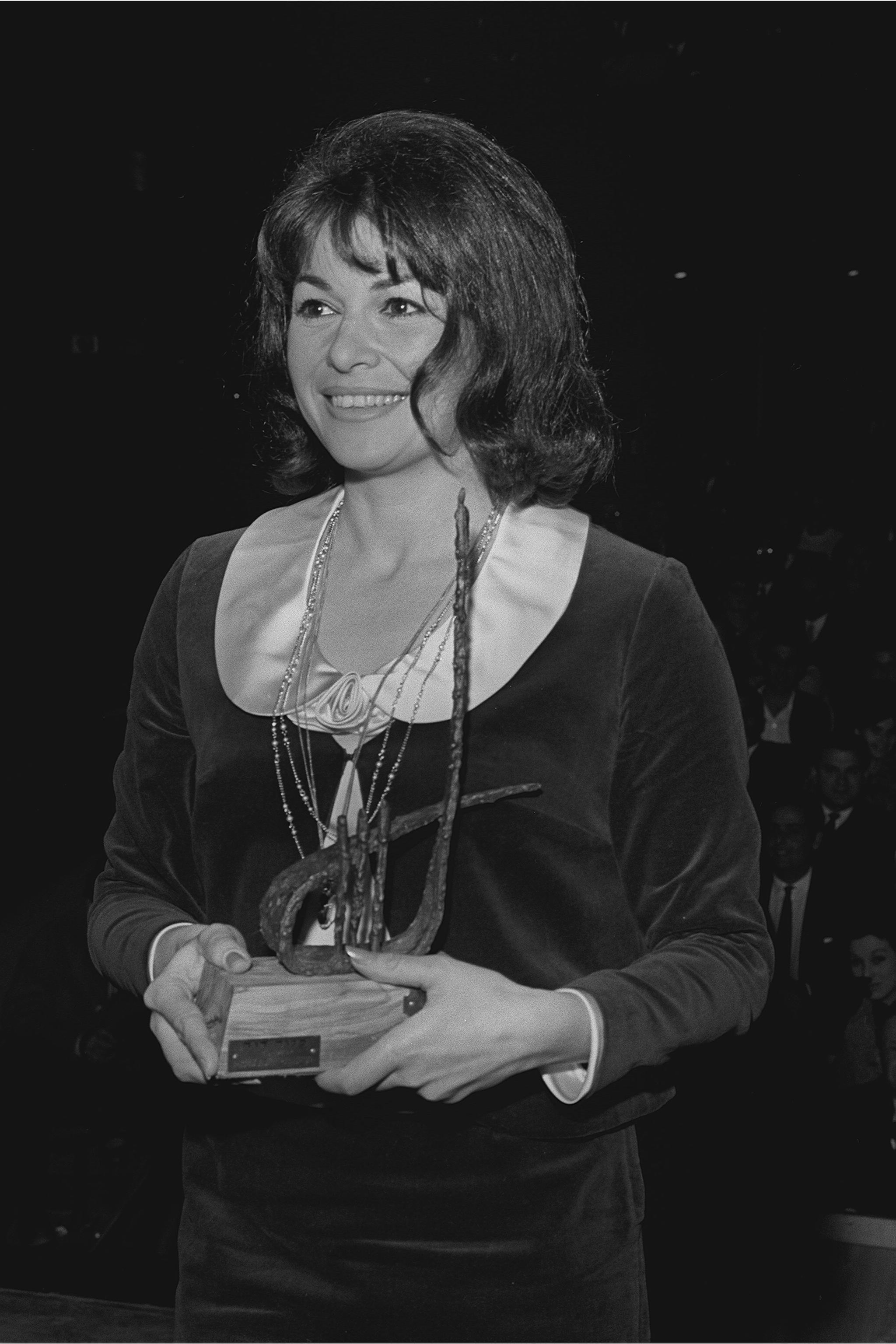
Gila Almagor, 1964

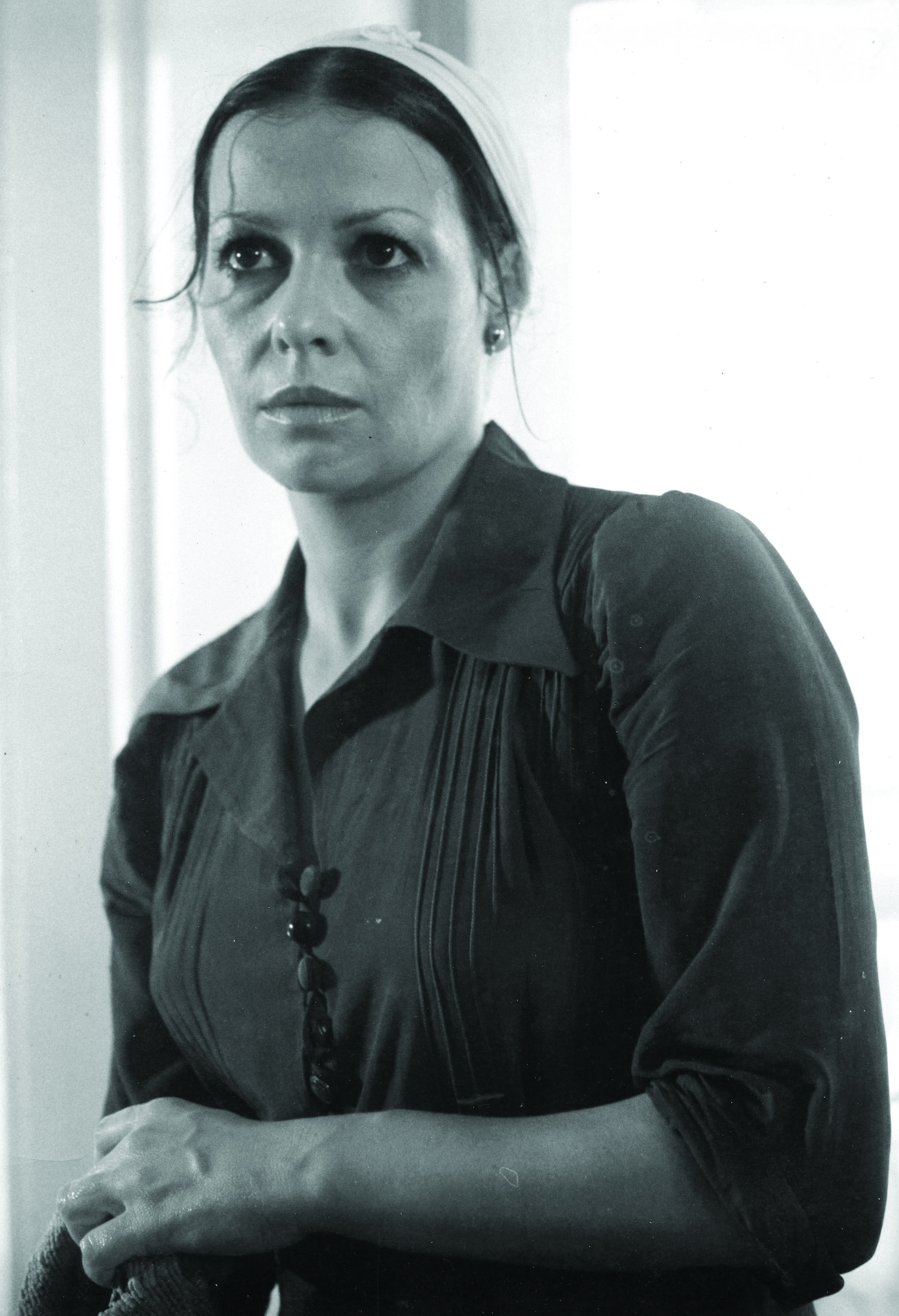
Almagor in The House on Chelouche Street, 1973

Two years later, she moved to Tel Aviv, rented a room near Habima Theatre, and applied to acting school. Although she was underage, she was accepted.

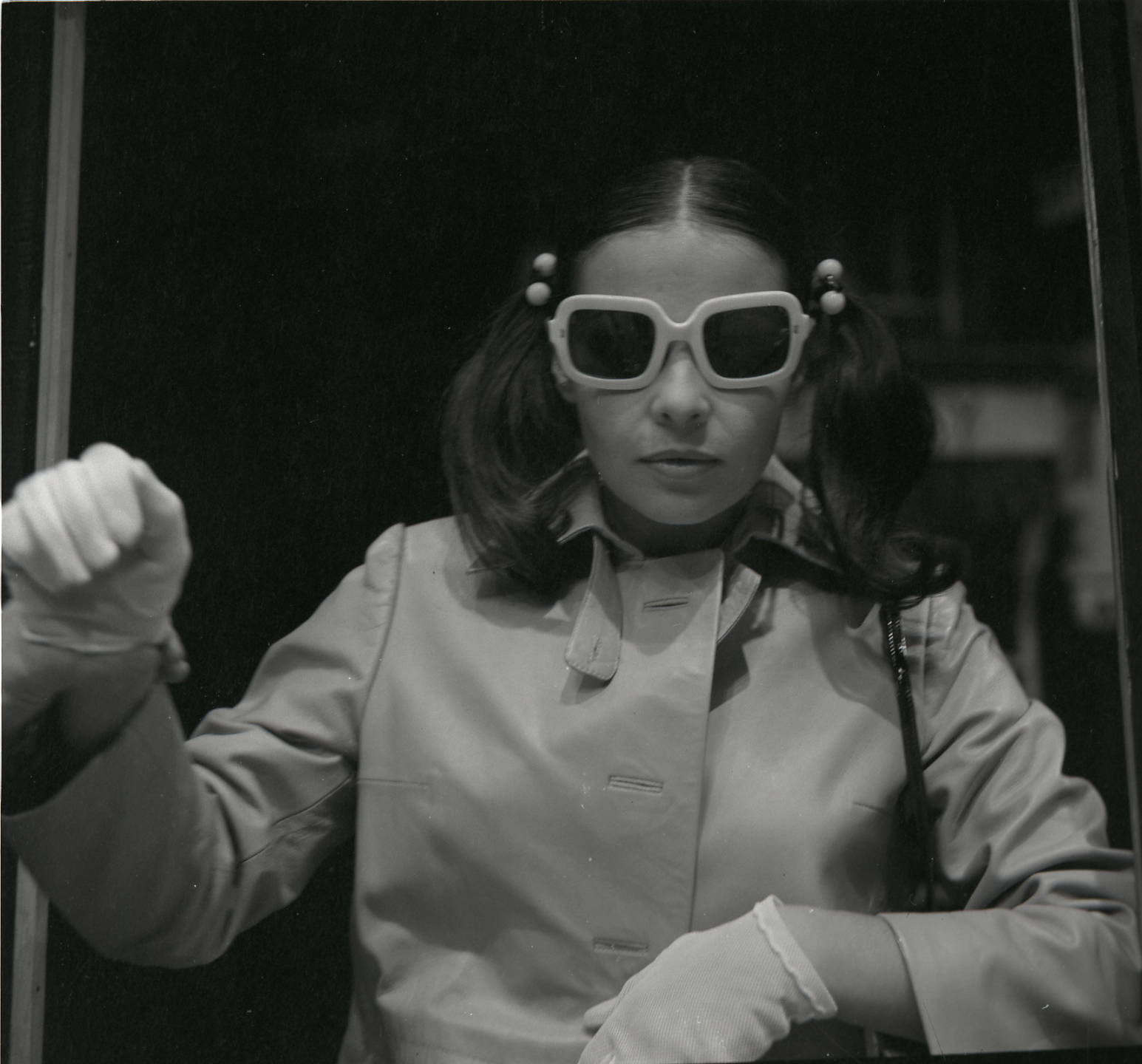
Gila Almagor, 1967

At the age of 17, Almagor debuted in Habima's production of The Skin of Our Teeth. Her autobiographical books Summer of Aviya and Under the Domim Tree were both made into films, with Almagor playing her own mother. She was married to Yaakov Agmon, former director of the Habima Theatre, until his death in 2020. They have two children.

== Stage, film and television ==
Almagor has played leading roles in many plays, among them Anne Frank, Jeanne d'Arc, The Crucible, Three Sisters, The Bride and the Butterfly Hunt, They Were All My Children, and Medea. She has appeared in over 50 films, including Siege, Queen of the Road, The House on Chelouche Street, Hide and Seek, El Dorado, Life According to Agfa and The Summer of Aviya.

Almagor starred as the mother of Avner, the main character in the 2005 film Munich. She also appears in The Debt, about a former Mossad agent who comes back to kill an escaped Nazi doctor. In 2008, she played the role of Lolah Baum in the 100-episode serial Dani Hollywood, broadcast on the Yes satellite network. In 2005, Almagor played a therapist in the award-winning Israeli television series BeTipul.

== Charity work and public service ==
Almagor founded the Gila Almagor Wish Fund, a charity for sick children, and co-founded AMI – the Israeli Artist Association. She currently serves as chair of cultural activities in the City Council of Tel Aviv and many other boards to promote the arts for children and in efforts to make international exchange between the Israeli performing arts world and abroad.

== Awards and critical acclaim ==
Almagor has received 10 Kinor David awards for her work in film and theater.

She received the Life Achievement Award at the Jerusalem Film Festival in 1996, a Life Achievement Award from the Israeli Academy of Cinema in 1997. For Summer of Aviya, she got the Silver Bear award for best actress at the Berlin Film Festival and the 1988 Silver Menorah Award for best actress.

In 1995, Almagor received a National Jewish Book Award for Under the Domin Tree.

In 1993, she was a member of the jury at the 18th Moscow International Film Festival. In 1996, she was a member of the jury at the 46th Berlin International Film Festival.

In 1990, she was chosen Actress of the Decade by Yediot Ahronoth and the Israel Film Institute. In 2004, she was awarded the Israel Prize, for cinema. In 2005, she received a Hans Christian Andersen Ambassadorship. In 2007, she was awarded the Liberitas Film Festival Prize for Lifetime Achievement (Croatia). In 2009, Ben-Gurion University of the Negev and Tel Aviv University awarded her an honorary doctorate.

== Filmography ==
- El Dorado (1963), as Margo
- Sallah Shabati (1964), as Batsheva Ha'Sosialit (social worker)
- Trunk to Cairo (1965), as Yasmin
- The House on Chelouche Street (1973), as Clara
- The Rose Garden (1989), as Ruth
- Life According to Agfa (1993), as Daliah
- Munich (2005), as Avner's Mother

== See also ==
- List of Israel Prize recipients
- Women of Israel
