= Ilan Moskovitch =

Israeli filmmaker and producer (born 1966)

- 'אילן מוסקוביץ
- Born: August 3, 1966 (age 60); Acre, Israel
- Occupations: Filmmaker, producer, director, casting director, acting instructor

Ilan Moskovitch (Hebrew: אילן מוסקוביץ'; born August 3, 1966), is an Israeli filmmaker, producer, director, casting director and acting instructor.

== Biography ==
Ilan Moskovitch was born and raised in Acre, Israel, second generation to immigrants from Romania, holocaust survivors. His father, Meir, owned a kiosk in ancient Acre, near the Arabic cinema "Bustan", and his mother, Anna, worked as a hospital nurse. Moskovitch is a graduate of the cinema department of "Camera Obscura – School of Art" (1992). In the year after his graduation, he worked as a production coordinator and manager for various TV projects, working with the directors Dan Wolman, Ze'ev Revach, and others. In 1995 he met the international Israeli director Amos Gitai. Moskovitch worked as his assistant in the movie "Dvarim," and since then the two cooperated in more than twenty-five movies, many of which were feature films for cinema, including "Free Zone", "Promised Land", "Alila", "Carmel", "Kadosh", "Disengagement", "Kippur", "Eden", "Kedma", "Yom Yom"

Four of those films: "Kadosh (1999), "Kippur" (2000), Kedma" (2002) and "Free Zone" (2005), participated in the Official Competition of the Cannes Film Festival (in which Moskovitch was the artistic consultant and the casting director). Moskovitch was the casting director in the film "Free Zone" in which Hana Laszlo won the Best Actress Prize in 2005 at the Cannes Film Festival, for her role in the film.

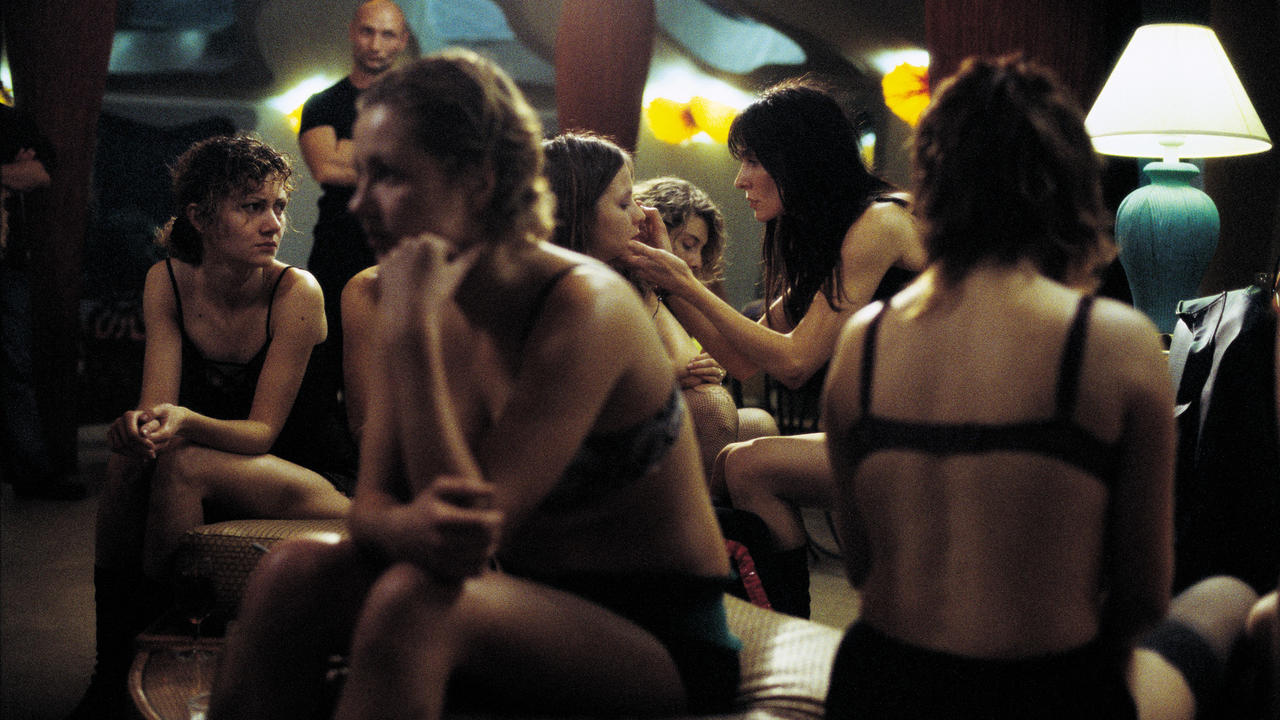
Anne Parillaud in "Promised Land", 2004

Moskovitch produced documentary films with Gitai, among them "Tapuz", "The Arena of Murder", "Golan Diary", "Milim" and a video installation entitled "The Public Residence of The Fifties", which was shown at the Mishkan Museum of Art, Ein Harod and at the Herzliya Museum of Contemporary Art, Herzliya.

Besides his work with Amos Gitai, he established in 1997 the production company "Cinemax" along with director David Noy; he produced the films "Peach", "What Now?", and "Arlekino Behind The Masks". In 2001 he produced commercials and communication videos with the journalist David Gilboa, for the Israeli Ministry of Environmental Protection, United Jewish Appeal, Shahal, Bank Hapoalim and Ford Motor Company. In 2003, he established "Impro" – Acting Studio for Cinema and TV with his partner, theater director Avi Malka. In 2008 he produced the feature film "Who kidnapped Moshe Ivgy?", directed by Avi Malka. This is the first full-length feature film produced by an acting school in Israel, in which all the major and lead roles were acted by third year graduates.

In 2009 he produced the documentary film "The Ambassadors", directed by Tal Agassi for Israel Channel 8.

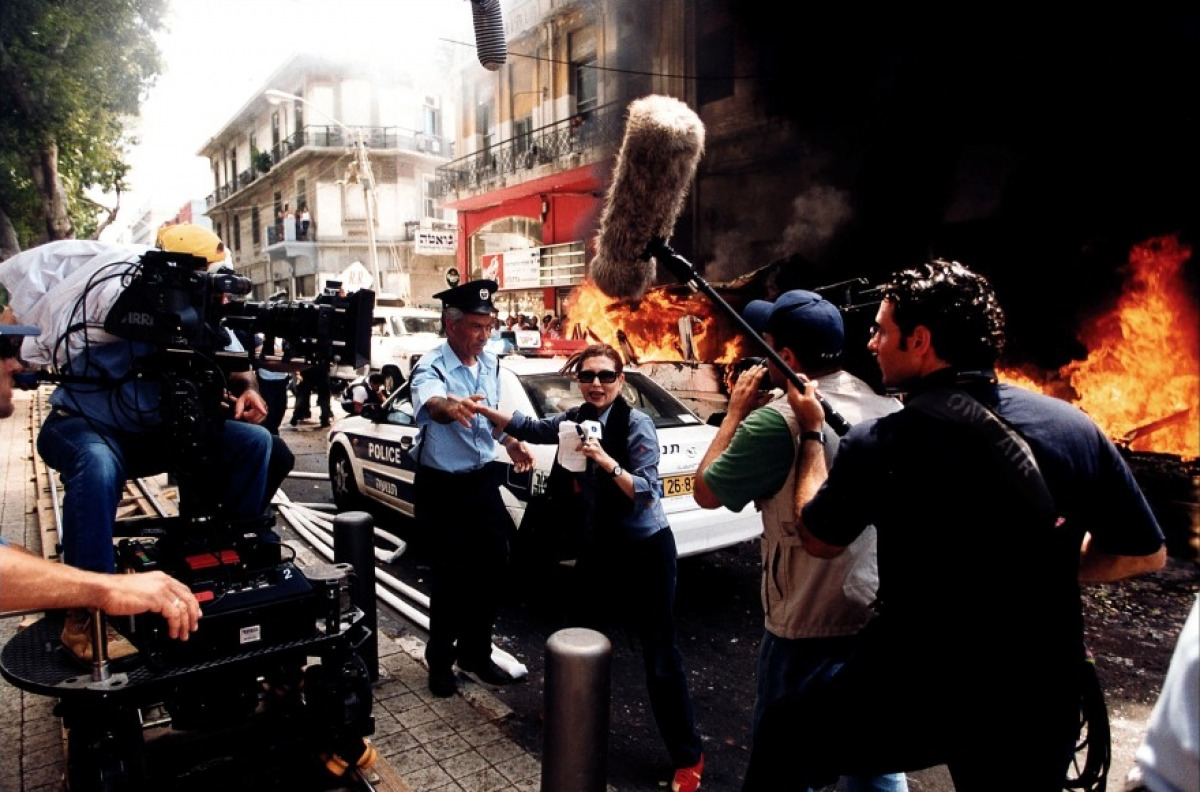
Keren Mor in "11'09"01 September 11", 2001

Together with Eran Paz he produced the documentary film "Jeremiah", directed by Eran Paz. The movie won the Best Director Prize Award for Documentary Film in the Jerusalem Film Festival 2010.

In 2013, together with Dan Bronfeld, Moskovitch directed and produced for Channel 8 a documentary film entitled "Appolonian Story". The film is about a man who built his home in a cave and lived there for forty years. The film participated in film festivals around the world, including AFI Docs, Full Frame Documentary Film Festival, Jerusalem Film Festival, Guangzhou International Documentary Film Festival, and Thessaloniki International Film Festival. In the same year, he worked on Giati's film "Ana Arabia," in which he served as the casting director. The film participated in the main competition at the 70th Venice International Film Festival. It's 81 minutes long filmed in a one shot. The actors include Yuval Scharf, Yussuf Abu-Warda, Sarah Adler, Assi Levy, Uri Gavriel, Shadi Srour, and Norman Issa. In 2015, he was the casting director and the artistic consultant for Amos Gitai's feature film "Rabin, the Last Day," about Shamgar Commission, which investigated the circumstances leading to the assassination of Israeli's Prime Minister, Yitzhak Rabin, twenty years ago. The film participated at the Venice Film Festival - Official Competition 2015 as well as the Toronto International Film Festival, 2015. In 2017, he worked as a producer on the film "Holy Air," with director Shadi Srour. The film participated in the official competition in the Tribeca Film Festival, participated in the Palm Springs International Film Festival and won FIPRESCI Prize as best debut in the national competition of the Jerusalem Film Festival of 2017. It was acquired for distribution in North America by Samuel Goldwyn Films. Srour and Laetitia Eido played the main roles.

In 2018, he was the casting director of the movie "A Tramway in Jerusalem" directed by Amos Gitai. The film participated in the Venice Film Festival. In 2020, he was the casting director of Gitai's movie "Laila in Haifa." The plot transpires through a night in nightclub in Haifa. The film participated in the competition at the Venice Film Festival. In 2024, he was one of the producers of Gitai's movie "Shikun," an Israel-Frence-Swiss-Brazil-United Kingdom co-production starring Irène Jacob. The film participates in the Berlin International Film Festival.

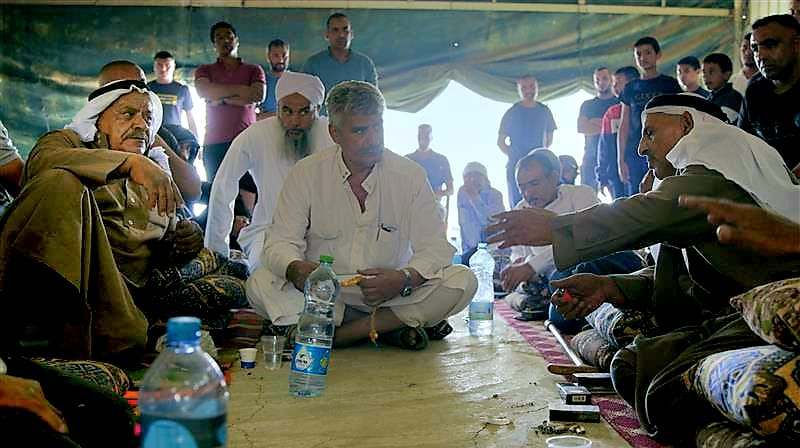
"Desert Laws", 2024

In 2024, he directed and produced alongside Dan Bronfeld for Kan 11 the film "Desert Laws" (80 minutes), which tells the story of Farhan Al-Nabari, a third-generation arbitrator in his family. Representatives of clans arrive at his tent in an unrecognized village in the Negev so that he may settle their disputes. Concurrently, he deals with the State of Israel's attempts to evict the residents of the village, where it had settled them seven decades earlier. The film discusses issues of identity, family, home, tradition, blood feud, reconciliation, house, and state. The premiere screening of the film took place at the Jerusalem Film Festival, where it participated in the documentary competition.

Moskovitch has worked with well-known Israeli film actors, among them: Moni Moshonov,Yael Abecassis,Hana Laszlo,Moshe Ivgy, Hanna Maron, Keren Mor, Yussuf Abu-Warda, Juliano Mer-Khamis,Ronit Elkabetz, Assi Dayan, Lea Koenig, Samuel Calderon, Liron Levo, Uri Klauzner,Amos Lavi. Moskovitch has also worked with international film actors such as: Jeanne Moreau, Juliette Binoche,Natalie Portman, Carmen Maura (Almodovar Films),Samantha Morton,Anne Parillaud (La Femme Nikita), Hanna Schygulla, Rosamund Pike.

== Filmography ==
List of film credits
Year	Title	Role	Director	Notes
2024	Desert Laws	co-Producer	Ilan Moskovitch, Dan Bronfeld	Jerusalem Film Festival
2024	Shikun	co-Producer	Amos Gitai	Berlin International Film Festival
2020	Laila in Haifa	Casting Director	Amos Gitai	77th Venice International Film Festival
2018	A Tramway in Jerusalem	Casting Director	Amos Gitai	Venice Film Festiva
2017	Holy Air (Feature Film)	Producer	Shady Srour	Tribeca Film Festival, Palm Springs International Film Festival, FIPRESCI Prize in the Jerusalem Film Festival
2015	Rabin The Last Day (Feature Film)	Casting Director	Amos Gitai	Venice Film Festival
2013	Apollonian Story (Documentary, 69 min)	Directors/Producers (with Dan Bronfeld)	Ilan Moskovitch & Dan Bronfeld	
2013	Ana Arabia (Feature Film)	Casting Director	Amos Gitai	Venice Film Festival
2010	Yirmiyahu (Documentary, 54 min)	Producer	Eran Paz	Best Director Award Documentary, Jerusalem Film Festival 2010
2010	Where is Moshe Ivgy? (Feature Film)	Producer	Avi Malka	
2009	War Of The Sons Of Lights Against Sons Of Darkness (Feature Film)	Casting Consultant	Amos Gitai	
2009	The Ambassadors (Documentary, 54 min)	Producer	Tal Agasi	
2008/9	Carmel (Feature Film)	Casting Director	Amos Gitai	
2007	Disengagement (Feature Film)	Casting Director	Amos Gitai	
2006	The Evil Spirit (Dybbuk) from Haifa (3 minute Short Film)	Artistic Consultant & Casting Director	Amos Gitai	
2005	Free Zone (Feature Film)	Casting Director & Artistic Consultant	Amos Gitai	Cannes Film Festival Award for Best Actress (Hana Laszlo)
2004	Promised Land (Feature Film)	Casting Director & Artistic Consultant	Amos Gitai	Venice Film Festival 2004 - Official selection, in competition
2003	Afarsek (Drama, 50 min)	Producer	David Noy	
2003	Alila (Feature Film)	Casting Director & Artistic Consultant	Amos Gitai	Venice Film Festival Participant
2002	Kedma (Feature Film)	Casting Director & Artistic Consultant	Amos Gitai	Cannes Film Festival 2002 - Official selection, in competition
2001	11'09"01 September 11 (11 minute Short Film)	Casting Director & Artistic Consultant	Amos Gitai	
2001	Eden (Feature Film)	Casting Director & Artistic Consultant	Amos Gitai	Venice Film Festival 2001 - Official selection, in competition
2000	Arlecchino: Behind the Masks (Documentary, 54 min)	Producer	David Noy	
2000	Kippur (Feature Film)	Casting Director & Artistic Consultant	Amos Gitai	Cannes Film Festival 2000 - Official selection, in competition
1999	Public Housing in the 50s (Video installation regarding Architecture, 65 min)	Producer, Cameraman	Amos Gitai	
1999	Kadosh (Feature Film)	Casting Director & Artistic Consultant	Amos Gitai	Cannes Film Festival 1999 - Official selection, in competition
1998	What Now? (Mocumentary, 51 min, Super 16mm)	Producer	David Noy	
1998	Tapuz (Documentary, 57 min)	Producer	Amos Gitai	
1998	Yom Yom (Feature Film)	Executive Producer	Amos Gitai	
1997	Golan Diary (Two- Part Documentary, 120 min)	Producer	Amos Gitai	
1996	Metamorphosis of a Melody (Milim, Documentary, 93 min)	Producer	Amos Gitai	
1996	The Arena Of Murder (Documentary, following the Assassination of Yitzhak Rabin, 80 min)	Producer	Amos Gitai	
1995	Devarim (Feature Film)	Casting Director	Amos Gitai	
