= Shredy Jabarin =

Israeli actor (born 1981)

Shredy Jabarin (Arabic: شريدي جبارين, Hebrew: שרדי ג'בארין; other orthographies: Shredi Jabarin) is an Israeli Arab actor. Born on the 2nd of Dec 1981 in Jaffa, he studied acting at the faculty of art in the theatre department and the film department in Tel Aviv University from 1999 to 2003. He participated in international films and theatre plays in English, French, German, Arabic and Hebrew. Shredy has one nomination for best actor for his role in the film For my Father. He played main parts in films like For my Father and The Saviour where he played Jesus.

In addition to acting, Jabarin has directed and produced short films, music videos and theatre plays.

== Actor ==
Nominations

- Nominated to the Israeli Film Academy Award for the Best Actor Category For my father, 2008.
- Nominated to the Israeli Theatre Award representing the Cameri theater, 2008.

Film

- 2015 The Children of light waiting for Giddo - Shredy Jabarin
- 2014 Mars at Sunrise - Jessica Habie
- 2013 Played the character of Jesus in the film “The Savior” - Robert Savo
- 2013 Kiddon - Emanuel Nekach
- 2010 Miral - Julian Schnabel
- 2009 Mrs. Moskowitz&the Cats - George Gorevitz
- 2009 Carmel - Amos Gitai
- 2008 Body of Lies - Ridley Scott
- 2008 For my Father - Dror Zahavi
- 2006 The Bubble - Eytan Fox
- 2005 Avenge but One of My Eyes - Avi Mograbi
- 2005 Free Zone - Amos Guitai

Theater

- 2011-2012 The Day before the last Day - Schaubuehne, Berlin, Germany
- 2010-2012 Death and the Maiden - directed by Juliano Mer Khamis Al Midan Theatre, Haifa, Israel
- 2009-2010 The Wars of Sons of Light - directed by Amos Guiai, with Jeanne Moreau and Éric Elmosnino in the Festival d'Avignon and the Odeon Theatre, Paris, France
- 2008-2010 The second End of Europe, directed by Janusz Wiśniewski - The Nowy Theatre, Poznan, Poland
- 2008-2008 Gefen Baladi - The Cameri Theatre, Tel Aviv, Israel
- 2006-2008 Plonter - The Cameri Theatre, Tel Aviv, Israel
- 2005-2005 The Red Tent - The Simta Theatre, Tel Aviv, Israel
- 2004-2004 Masked - The Arab Hebrew Theatre, Tel Aviv, Israel
- 2004-2004 A winter in the Checkpoint directed by Nola Chilton - The Arab Hebrew Theatre, Tel Aviv, Israel
- 2003-2004 Forced Landing - The Arab Hebrew Theatre, Tel Aviv, Israel

TV

- 2013 The Jerusalem Syndrome - Dror Zahavi, ARD
- 2012 Munich '72 - Dror Zahavi, ZDF
- 2010-2011 Taxi Driver - Eythan Haner, Ethan Zur
- 2010 Arabs Labor - Shay Capon
- 2009 Naked Truth - Uri Barbash
- 2008-2008 Good Intentions - Uri Barabash

== Director, writer, producer ==
- Wrote, directed and produced the short films
1. The Children of light waiting for Giddo - 2015
2. Disconnections - 2015
3. I am that - 2014
4. MissBerlin - 2013
- Wrote, directed and produced music videos
1. Crying dogs - 2014
2. Kali - 2013
- Wrote and directed the theatre play
1. MissFire - 2010

== Articles and sources ==
- Personal website
- Shredy Jabarin at IMDb
- In 'For My Father,' A Bridge-Building Too Far?
- From the New York Times
- For my father
- "A review from the new NYT about The Bubble". The New York Times.
