= Yussuf Abu-Warda =

Arab-Israeli actor

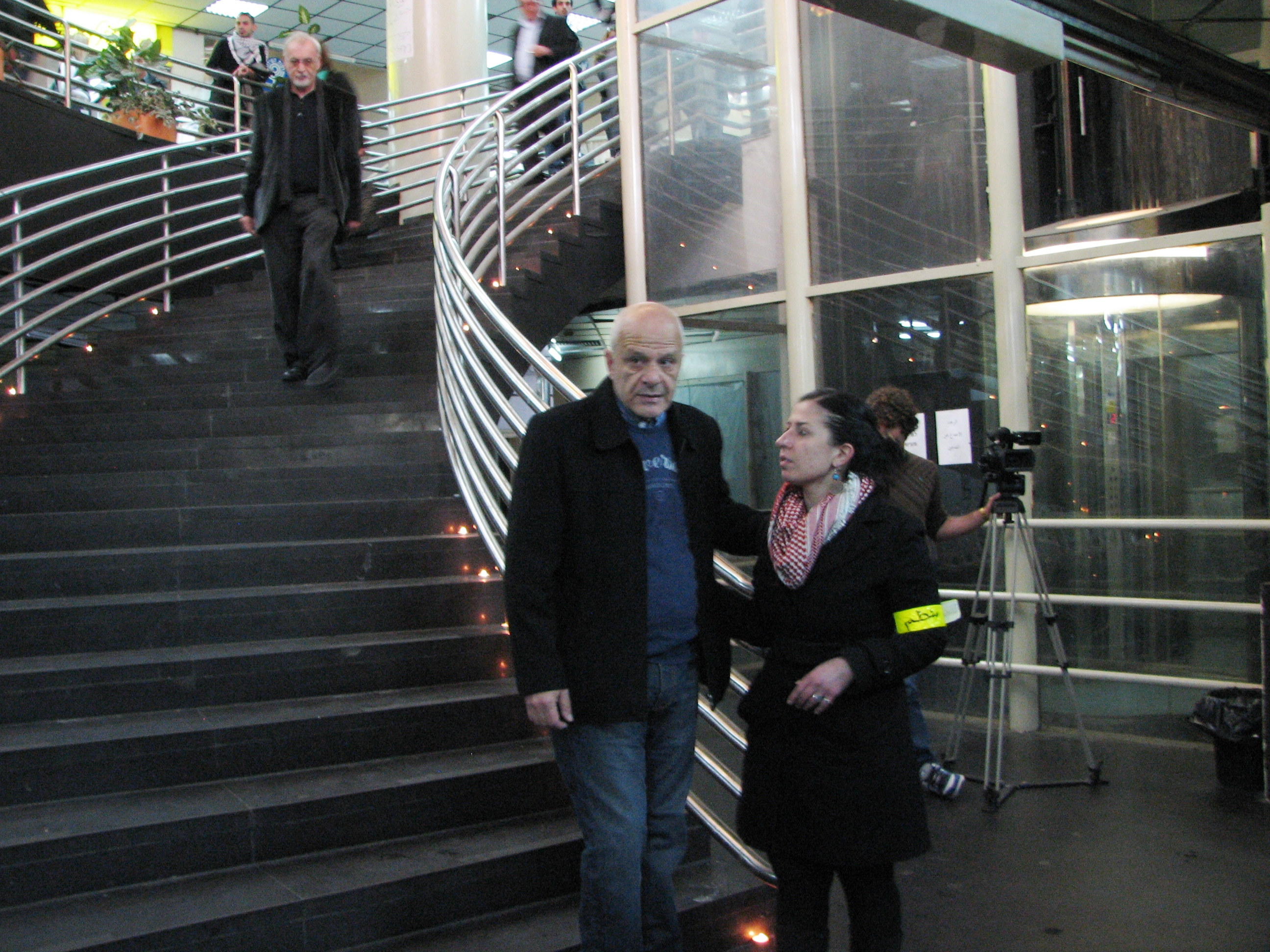
Yussuf Abu-Warda, 2011

Yussuf Abu-Warda (Arabic: يوسف أبو وردة, Hebrew: יוּסף אבו ורדה; born 19 August 1953 in Jish, Israel) is an Arab-Israeli actor of Palestinian heritage. A leading actor from 1999 he was head of Al-Midan Theater in Haifa.

In October 2018, he received a life achievement award from the Union of Israeli Performing Artists.

== Filmography ==
- On a Narrow Bridge
- 1984 : Magash Hakesef
- 1985 : Gesher Tzar Me'od
- 1986 : Nadia
- 1987 : *Noce en Galilée (Urs al-jalil) Michel Khleifi : Bacem ( Youssef Abou Warda)
- 1991 : Cup Final (Gmar Gavi'a) Eran Riklis : George (comme Youssef Abou Warda)
- 1998 : Yom Yom Amos Gitaï : Yussuf
- 1999 : Aaron Cohen's Debt, TV film : Taylor (credited Youssef Abou Warda)
- 1999 : Kadosh directed Amos Gitaï : Rav Shimon
- 1999 : La Voie lactée (Shvil Hahalav) d'Ali Nasser : Gouverneur
- 2002 : Kedma Amos Gitai : L’Arabe
- 2003 : Tik Sagur TV series : father of Benny
- 2003 : Afarsek : taxi driver
- 2004 : Shnat Effes : employee of job agency
- 2004 : Promised Land, Amos Gitaï : Yussuf
- 2004 : Bizman Emet (TV film) : as Turgeman, directeur adjoint du Mossad
- 2005 : Ahava Me'ever Lapina (TV series) : Ze'ev
- 2007 : HaModedim
- 2007 : Désengagement Amos Gitaï : as Youssef
- 2008 : For My Father (Sof Shavua B'Tel Aviv : Week-end à Tel Aviv) de Dror Zahavi : Saleh
- 2008: Lost Islands
- 2009 : Amerrika de Cherien Dabis: Nabeel Halaby
- 2009 : Hatsuya (TV series): Ardak
- 2007- 2011 : Ha-Borer (TV series): Amram 'Bulldog'
- 2012 : Héritage (Inheritance) Hiam Abbass : Khalil
- 2013 : Ana Arabia Amos Gitaï
- 2014 : The Savior as Luke
- 2015 : 3000 Nights
- 2017 : Holy Air
- 2019 : The Dead of Jaffa
