= Norman Issa =

Arab-Israeli actor (born 1967)

- نورمان عيسى
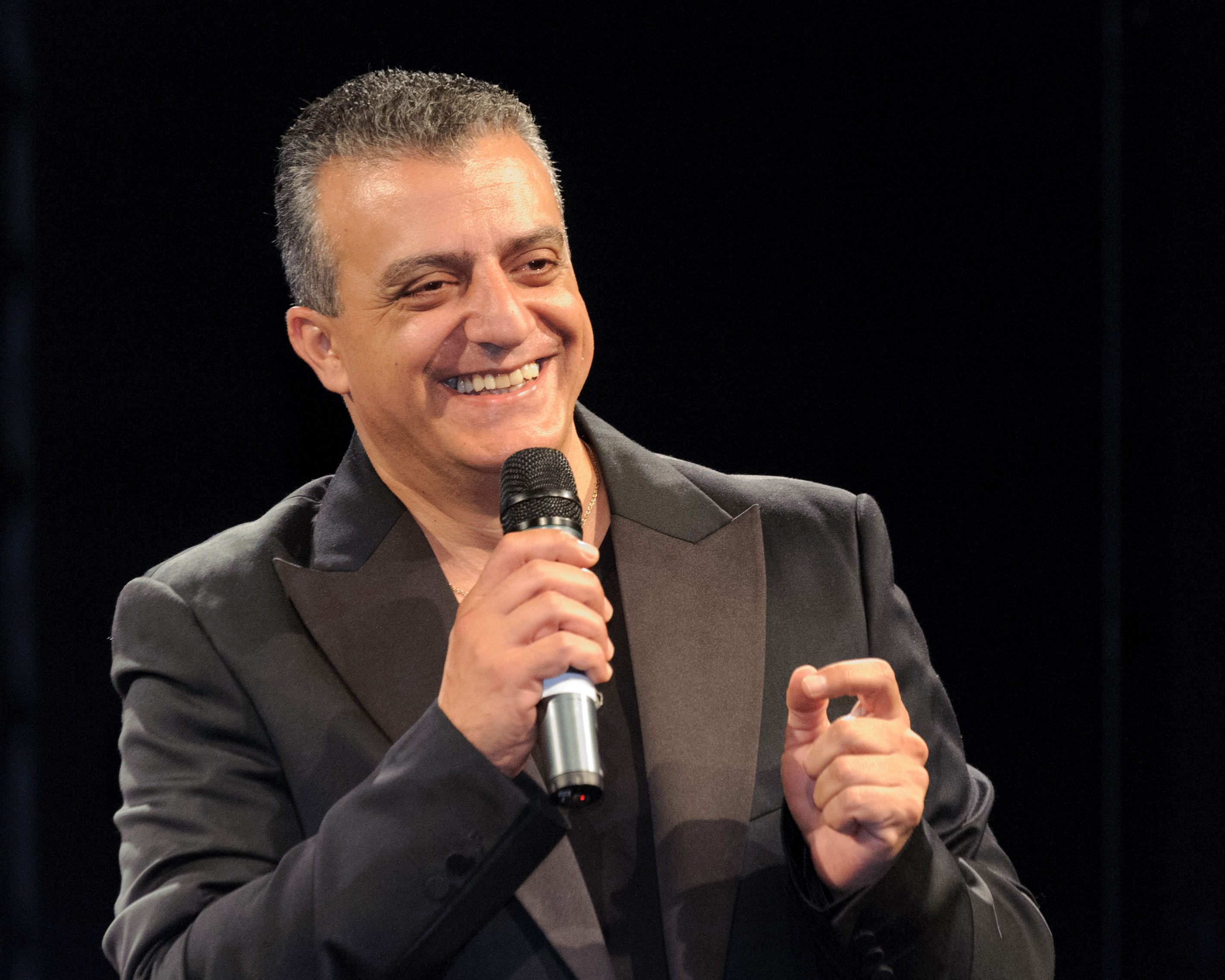
- Born: 17 June 1967 (age 58); Haifa, Israel
- Occupation: Actor
- Years active: 1998–present
- Spouse: Gidona Raz
- Children: 3, including Lear Issa, Shon Issa

Norman Issa (Arabic: نورمان عيسى, Hebrew: נורמן עיסא; born 17 June 1967) is an Arab-Israeli actor, director in cinema, theatre and television.

== Biography ==
Norman Issa was born and raised in Haifa, Israel, to a Maronite Christian-Arab family. He studied acting at Beit Zvi. He is married to Jewish-Israeli playwright Gidona Raz, with whom he has three sons. Lear and Sean Issa are actors. The couple jointly founded the multicultural Elmina Theater in Jaffa, Israel. They reside in Jaffa.

== Theater, television and film career ==
Issa has acted in many plays by William Shakespeare at the Haifa Theatre and Cameri Theatre. He worked at The Arab-Hebrew Theater together with fellow Arab-Israeli actor Yousef "Joe" Sweid. He was the main protagonist of the Israeli television sitcom Arab Labor, created by Arab-Israeli journalist Sayed Kashua.

In 2015, Issa refused to perform in a settlement in the Jordan Valley. In response, Israeli Minister of Culture Miri Regev threatened to shut down Israeli government funding to the theater that Issa founded.

== Awards and recognition ==
At the 2016 Haifa International Film Festival, Norman Issa and Moshe Ivgy were awarded the prize for Best Actor in a Feature Film, for The 90 Minute War.

== Filmography ==
- The Syrian Bride (2004), directed by Eran Riklis
- Arab Labor (2007–present), created by Sayed Kashua
- Ana Arabia (2013), directed by Amos Gitai
- A Borrowed Identity (2014), directed by Eran Riklis
- The 90 Minute War (2016), directed by Eyal Halfon

== See also ==
- Television in Israel
- Israeli cinema
