= Miral =

- French film poster
- Directed by: Julian Schnabel
- Screenplay by: Rula Jebreal
- Based on: Miral by Rula Jebreal
- Produced by: Jon Kilik; François-Xavier Decraene; Sonia Raule; Jérôme Seydoux
- Starring: Hiam Abbass; Freida Pinto; Yasmine Al Masri; Ruba Jebreal; Alexander Siddig; Omar Metwally; Stella Schnabel; Willem Dafoe; Vanessa Redgrave; Shredy Jabarin
- Cinematography: Éric Gautier
- Edited by: Juliette Welfling
- Music by: Olivier Daviaud
- Production companies: Rotana TV; Rotana Studios; Rotana Film Production; Pathé; The Weinstein Company; ER Productions; Canal+ CinéCinéma; Eagle Pictures; India Take One Productions
- Distributed by: Rotana TV; Rotana Studios (MENA); Pathé (France); Eagle Pictures (Italy); The Weinstein Company (United States)
- Release date: 15 September 2010 (France)
- Running time: 112 minutes
- Countries: France; India; Israel; Italy; Palestine; United States
- Languages: English; Arabic; Italian; Hebrew
- Box office: $900,647

Miral is a 2010 biographical political film directed by Julian Schnabel about the coming of age of a Palestinian girl named Miral who grows up in the wake of the 1948 Arab–Israeli War and finds herself drawn into the conflict. The screenplay was written by Rula Jebreal, based on her novel of the same name. The film was released on 3 September at the 2010 Venice Film Festival and on 15 September 2010 in France.

== Plot ==
The film begins with a chronicle of Hind Husseini's effort to establish an orphanage in Jerusalem after the 1948 Arab–Israeli War, the Deir Yassin Massacre, and the establishment of the state of Israel. In Jerusalem in 1948, on her way to work, Hind Husseini (Hiam Abbass) comes across 55 orphaned children in the street. She takes them home to give them food and shelter. Within six months, the number of children grows to almost 2,000, and the Dar Al-Tifel Institute is born.

Miral (Freida Pinto) is sent to the Institute by her father in 1978, at the age of 5 following her mother's death. Brought up safely inside the Institute's walls, she is naïve to the troubles surrounding her. Then, at the age of 15, she is assigned to teach at a refugee camp where she is awakened to the reality of the Palestinian refugees. When she falls for Hani, a militant, she finds herself torn between the First Intifada of her people and Mama Hind's belief that she has soaked up that education is the road to peace.

== Cast ==
- Sama Abu Khdeir as Little Rania
- Hiam Abbass as Hind al-Husseini
- Freida Pinto as Miral
- Yasmine Al Masri as Nadia
- Ruba Blal as Fatima
- Alexander Siddig as Jamal
- Omar Metwally as Hani
- Willem Dafoe as Eddie
- Vanessa Redgrave as Bertha Spafford
- Stella Schnabel as Lisa
- Makram Khoury as Khatib
- Zidane Awad as Miras
- Doraid Liddawi as Sameer
- Shredy Jabarin as Ali
- Juliano Mer-Khamis as Sheikh Saabah

== Production ==
The Palestinian girl is the author Rula Jebreal. Her novel on which the movie is based is a strongly autobiographical account of her youth in West Bank. She's torn between the injustice she sees at the hands of the Israeli army during the First Intifada and a desire for peace.

Schnabel revealed that the project had relevance for his own family history, figuring that he was a pretty good person to tell the other side of the story, given his background, as an American Jew whose mother was president, in 1948, of the Brooklyn chapter of Hadassah the Women's Zionist Organisation of America.

== Release ==
The film was released on 3 September at the 2010 Venice Film Festival and on 15 September 2010 in France. The film was set for release on 3 December 2010 in the United Kingdom, and on 25 March 2011 in the United States.

Miral was initially rated R by the MPAA for "some violent content including a sexual assault." Later, however, it was reclassified to PG-13 for "thematic material, and some violent content including a sexual assault" after an appeal of the R rating by the Weinstein Company.

== Reception ==
=== Critics ===
Miral received negative reviews from critics. On review aggregator website Rotten Tomatoes, the film holds an approval rating of 18%, based on 65 reviews, and an average rating of 4.5/10. On Metacritic, the film has a weighted average score of 45 out of 100, based on 51 critics, indicating "mixed or average reviews".

Kelly Vance wrote that "Pinto handles the central role with a certain dignity, but the real drama is in Miral’s rejection of violence in favor of Hind Husseini’s (Abbass) example of education and negotiation".

Kenneth Morefield opined that "Miral is an ambitious film, and it may be that Schnabel's reputation has led to unrealistic expectations about what any film can (or should attempt to) accomplish. While it falls short of greatness, it has many admirable qualities".

Sheri Linden of The Los Angeles Times writes, "The lack of a compelling lead figure, combined with Schnabel's tentative approach to the material, casts the film's later stretches in the balmy glow of soap opera." Justin Chang of Variety similarly adds, "Schnabel's signature blend of splintered storytelling and sobering humanism feels misapplied to this sweeping multigenerational saga of four Arab women living under Israeli occupation, the youngest of which, Miral, emerges a bland totem of hope rather than a compelling movie subject."

Deborah Young of The Hollywood Reporter described the film as "a political film with a message of hope, on the obvious side".

Miral was reviewed by Geoffrey Macnab of The Independent as "choppily edited" and "unevenly performed" but also "courageous" and "groundbreaking."

== Public discussion with filmmakers ==
An open public panel discussion about Miral took place on 30 March 2011 at the Center for Palestine Studies at Columbia University with film director Julian Schnabel and Palestinian journalist Rula Jebreal on whose autobiographical novel the film was based. Helga Tawil Souri, Professor of Media, Culture, & Communication at NYU, and Hamid Dabashi, Professor of Iranian Studies & Comparative Literature at Columbia University, led and moderated the panel discussion. During the discussion with the moderators, Schnabel and Jebreal discussed the events that led to the film's premiere at the UN General Assembly. Schnabel described the film as sending a political message in his discussions with UN General Assembly President, Mr. Joseph Deiss.

The premiere at the UN was opposed by the Israeli government and the American Jewish Committee as it depicted Israel in a "highly negative light." The Jewish-American director Julian Schnabel urged AJC members to see the film, as he felt they had misunderstood its intent. "I love the State of Israel," wrote Schnabel, "I believe in it, and my film is about preserving it, not hurting it … Instead of saying 'no,’ I ask the AJC to say 'yes,’ see Miral and join the discussion." Hollywood stars Sean Penn, Robert De Niro, Steve Buscemi and Josh Brolin attended the premiere.

== See also ==
- Deir Yassin massacre
- Israeli Declaration of Independence
- 1948 Arab–Israeli War
