= The Savior (2014 film) =

- المخلص
- Directed by: Robert Savo
- Written by: Philip Dorr
- Screenplay by: Philip Dorr
- Produced by: Robert Savo
- Starring: Abeer Issa; Ashraf Barhom; Ghassan Mashini; Mohammed Bakri; Nadera Emr; Shredi Jabarin; Yussuf Abu-Warda; Zuhair al Noubani
- Cinematography: Emil Topuzov
- Edited by: Ruslan Grudev; Alexander Tsvetkov
- Music by: Talal Abu-Alragheb
- Production company: Grace Productions
- Release date: 2014
- Running time: 136 min.
- Countries: Palestine, Jordan, Bulgaria
- Language: Arabic

The Savior (Arabic: المخلص, romanized: al-Mukhalliṣ) is a 2014 Arabic language Bulgarian-Jordanian film about the life of Jesus directed by Robert Savo written by Philip Dorr.

The Life of Jesus

== Cast ==
- Yussuf Abu-Warda, as Luke the Evangelist
- Ayman Nahas, as John the Baptist
- Shredy Jabarin, as Jesus
- Hanan Hillo, as Mary, mother of Jesus
- Nariman al Qurneh, as Mary Magdalene
- Mohammad Bakri, as Herod
- Maisa Abd Elhadi, as Salome
