= Kadosh =

1999 Israeli film

- Directed by: Amos Gitai
- Written by: Eliette Abecassis; Amos Gitai
- Produced by: Amos Gitai; Michel Propper
- Starring: Yaël Abecassis; Yoram Hattab; Meital Barda; Uri Klauzner; Yussuf Abu-Warda
- Cinematography: Renato Berta
- Edited by: Monica Coleman; Kobi Netanel
- Music by: Philippe Eidel; Louis Sclavis
- Production companies: MP Productions; Agav Hafakot
- Distributed by: Ocean Film (France); C-Films (Netherlands); Mikado (Italy); Kino International (United States)
- Release dates: 10 June 1999 (France); 18 February 2000 (United States)
- Running time: 116 minutes
- Countries: France; Israel
- Language: Hebrew
- Box office: $770,132 (United States)

Kadosh (Hebrew: קדוש, lit. 'Sacred') is a 1999 film by Israeli director Amos Gitai based on a script he co-wrote with Eliette Abecassis and starring Yaël Abecassis, Yoram Hattab, Meital Barda and Uri Klauzner and Yussuf Abu-Warda.

The movie was entered into the 1999 Cannes Film Festival.

== Plot ==
Kadosh is a drama about the Haredi society. In the opening scene, Meir (Yoram Hattab), a young Talmudic scholar, thanks God in his morning prayers for not being born a woman. At first, the marriage of Meir and his wife, Rivka (Yael Abecassis), appears tender and idyllic, but as the movie progresses, it becomes clear that Meir is concerned with the fact that he is childless after ten years of marriage. Meir's father, the Rabbi of their community in Jerusalem, tells Meir he is required to divorce Rivka because a woman's only function is to have children. Eventually, Meir complies, which destroys Rivka emotionally, and she moves away so that Meir can marry a cousin.

Rivka's younger sister, Malka, marries Yosef in a match arranged by her parents, even though she loves Yaakov, a rock singer who has abandoned the religious community. When Yosef is sexually cold to her, she leaves for a night with Yaakov; when she returns, Yosef calls her a "slut" and beats her with a belt. She runs out of their apartment.

Meir, having divorced Rivka and re-married, shows up at Rivka's apartment on the Purim holiday (when men traditionally get drunk), and wants to be with her (a Haredi man would normally never be alone with a woman who is not his wife). She retreats initially. We do not see what happens, but when Malka runs to Rivka's apartment after Yosef beats her, Rivka babbles about being pregnant.

In a scene which could be a dream or allegory, Rivka comes to Meir, who is sleeping, lies down with him, and drapes herself all over him, but he does not wake up (nor is his new wife present, suggesting this is not actually the storyline). Eventually, she falls asleep on top of him. He wakes up, and cannot rouse her. He shakes Rivka, and tries to wake her, as she has apparently died of a broken heart. The movie ends with Malka, alone after having left Yosef, looking over the city of Jerusalem.

== Cast ==
- Yaël Abecassis – Rivka
- Yoram Hattab – Meïr
- Meital Barda – Malka
- Uri Klauzner – Yossef (as Uri Ran-Klausner)
- Yussuf Abu-Warda – Rav Shimon
- Lea Koenig – Elisheva (as Lea Koenig)
- Sami Huri – Yaakov
- Rivka Michaeli – Gynaecologist
- Samuel Calderon – Uncle Shmouel
- Noa Dori – Noa
- Shireen Kadivar – Lexa

== Reception ==
The film was described as "powerful despite a weak direction" and was noted for documenting the history of Jerusalem and orthodox Jewish communities.

The movie was reviewed in the New York Times.
