= Rula Jebreal =

Palestinian born Italian writer (born 1973)

- رولا جبريل
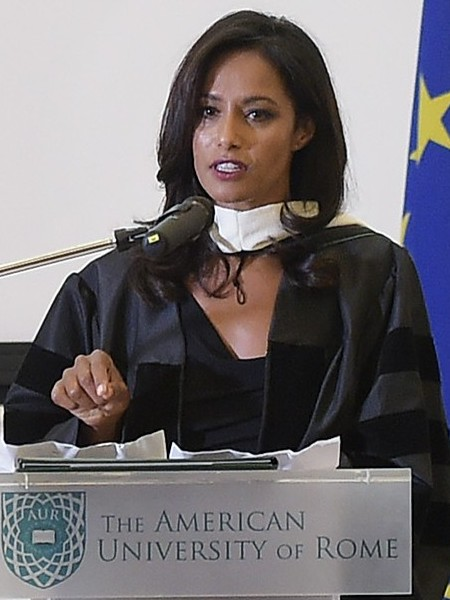
- Jebreal at the American University of Rome in September 2017
- Born: 24 April 1973 (age 53); Haifa, Israel
- Citizenship: Israeli; Italian
- Education: University of Bologna
- Occupations: Journalist; commentator; author
- Spouse: Arthur Altschul, Jr. (m. 2013; div. 2016)
- Children: 1
- Website: rulajebreal.net

External videos
- Jebreal on her secret interview with Jamal Khashoggi

Rula Jebreal (/dʒɪˈbriːl/ jib-REEL; Arabic: رولا جبريل, romanized: Rūlā Jibrīl; Hebrew: רולא ג׳בריל; born 24 April 1973) is a Palestinian foreign policy analyst, journalist, novelist, and screenwriter with dual Israeli and Italian citizenship. She was a commentator for MSNBC.

== Early life and education ==
Jebreal was born in Haifa, Israel, to Nigerian-born Othman Jebreal and his wife Zakia, and grew up in Jerusalem. Her father was a Sufi imam and a groundskeeper at Al-Aqsa Mosque. Her mother, who suffered from severe abuse in her childhood, committed suicide by walking into the sea and drowning in 1978, when Jebreal was 5. She and her sister Rania were immediately put into the Dar El-Tifel orphanage by their father, and were raised there until 1991. She regards its founder, Hind al-Husseini, as her teacher and mother, crediting her with saving her life. In 1993, she received a scholarship from the Italian government to study at the University of Bologna, where she graduated with a degree in physiotherapy.

== Career ==
Jebreal worked as a journalist in Italy for twelve years. In 2006 she worked with Michele Santoro as an interviewer on AnnoZero, a political television show in Italy. Jebreal's first novel Miral was published in 2003. The film version, adapted by Jebreal, and directed by Julian Schnabel, was first released in 2010. Jebreal's second novel The Bride of Aswan was published in 2007. Her third book, Rejected, is a non-fiction study based on interviews with immigrants who have either made their way to successful careers in Italy or otherwise live on the margins of Italian society.

In 2026, Jebreal received widespread criticism for labelling U.S. House Minority Leader Hakeem Jeffries as an "AIPAC monkey" and "errand boy" on "The Left Hook" podcast with Wajahat Ali. The Congressional Black Caucus released a statement condemning her language as promoting racism against African-Americans, with U.S. politicians such as Ayanna Pressley and Ritchie Torres putting out condemnations of their own. Jonathan Chait, a writer for The Atlantic claimed her statement had antisemitic implications as well, arguing that she was making Jeffries out to be a "brainless puppet" for Jews.

== Personal life ==
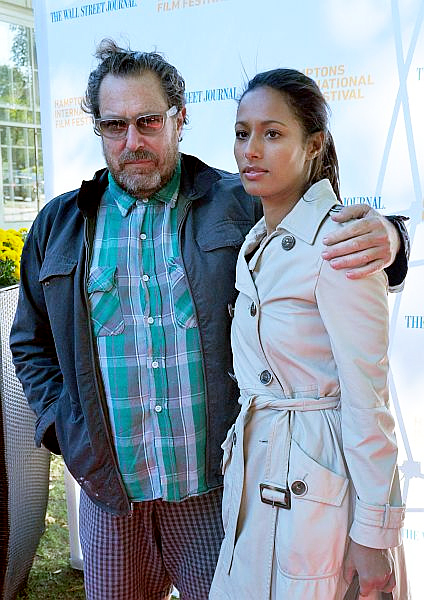
Jebreal and Julian Schnabel in 2010

Jebreal has a daughter, Miral, whose father is artist Davide Rivalta (it). Jebreal's collaboration with Julian Schnabel on Miral extended beyond the movie, being in a relationship with him from 2007 to 2011. In 2013, she married Arthur Altschul, Jr., son of banker Arthur Goodhart Altschul Sr. and a member of the Lehman family. She divorced Altschul in 2016 and started dating Roger Waters, founder of Pink Floyd. She is fluent in four languages: Arabic, Hebrew, English and Italian. She describes herself as a "secular Muslim".

== Works ==
- La strada dei fiori di Miral, BUR Biblioteca Univ. Rizzoli, 2005, ISBN 978-88-17-00850-1
  - Miral. Translated by John Cullen. Penguin. 2010. ISBN 978-0-14-311619-6.
  - Ørkenblomsten, Engelstad forl., 2005, ISBN 978-82-92533-10-9
  - Miral – Ein Land. Drei Frauen. Ein gemeinsamer Traum, Translated Leon Mengden, Btb, 2010, ISBN 978-3-442-74148-9
- La sposa di Assuan, (Bride of Aswan) Rizzoli, 2005, ISBN 978-88-17-00867-9
  - La promise d'Assouan, Translated Lucie Comparini, Altal éd., 2007, ISBN 978-2-916736-04-4
  - A esposa de Assuão, Campo das Letras, 2007, ISBN 978-989-625-237-3
- Divieto di soggiorno: l'Italia vista con gli occhi dei suoi immigrati, (Rejected) Milan, Italy: Rizzoli, 2007, ISBN 978-88-17-01270-6
