= Misha Segal =

Israeli music producer and film composer

Misha Segal מישה סגל
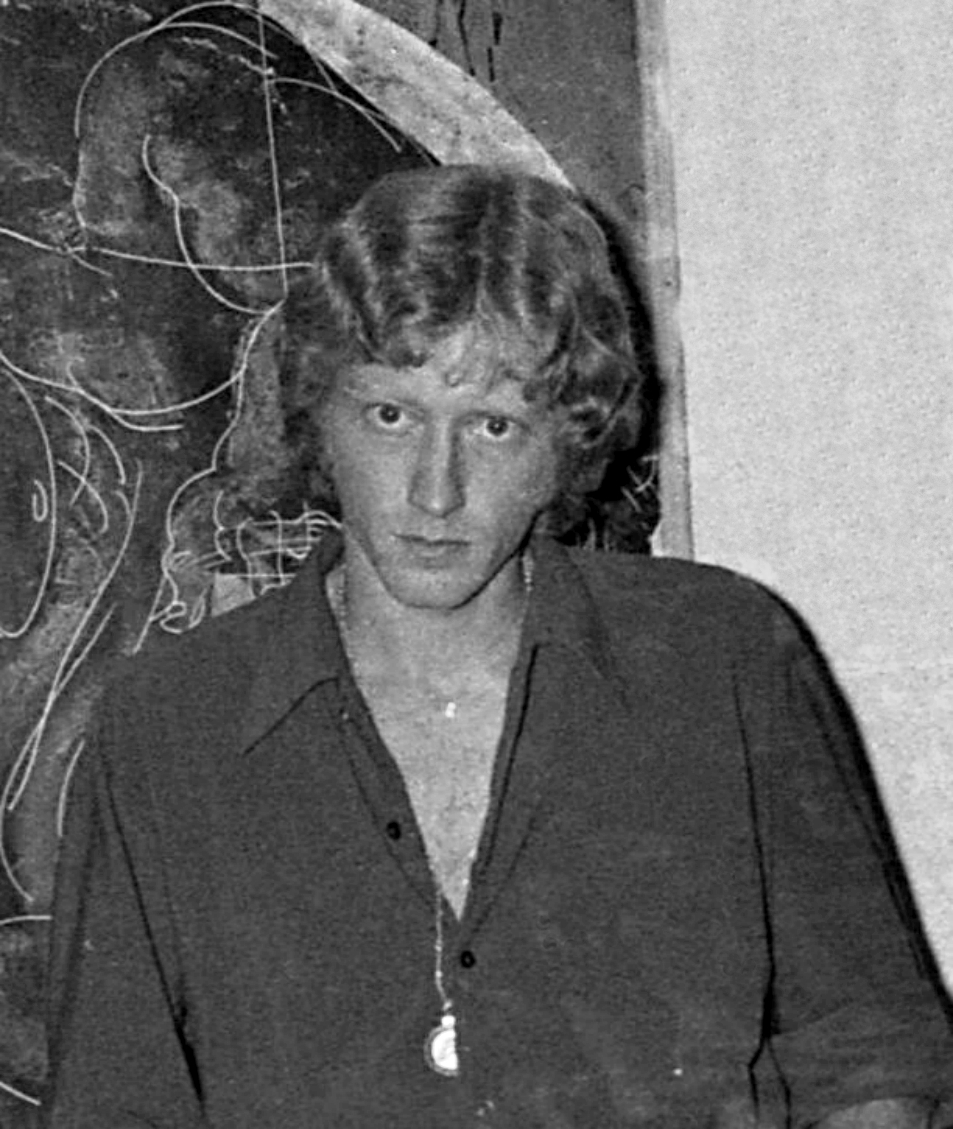
- Misha Segal, 1969

Background information
- Born: Haifa, Israel
- Genres: Film composer
- Occupation: Composer

Misha Segal (Hebrew: מישה סגל) is an Israeli music producer and film composer. He studied music, film, and philosophy at Tel Aviv University and apprenticed under Dieter Schöhnbach in Germany. Segal also studied composition and conducting at the Guildhall School of Music and Drama in London, after which point he attended the Berklee College of Music in Boston. Segal has stated that he has been influenced by jazz, Elton John and The Beatles.

Segal has worked on several projects, including Blue Lou and Misha Project - Highly Classified, a Christmas CD with Diane Arkenstone, and a piano collection made to raise awareness for lung cancer awareness.

Segal was born in Haifa, Israel, to a Jewish family. He served in the Israel Defense Forces Orchestra of the Israeli Air Force.

== Awards ==
- Award of the Israeli Film Academy for Best Music (2008, nominated - Sof Shavua B'Tel Aviv)
- Black Reel for Best Original Score (2012, nominated - Mooz-lum)
- Daytime Emmy for Outstanding Music Composition in Children's Programming (1984, won - for "Andrea's Story: A Hitchhiking Tragedy", episode 12.4 of ABC Afterschool Specials)
- Brit Award (The Phantom of the Opera)

== Discography ==
- Let it In (1979, as Charme)
- The Phantom of the Opera (1989, soundtrack)
- Zambooka (1991)
- Connected to the Unexpected (1996, as Misha)
- Female (2003)
- Female Part II (2005)
- Simplemente el Piano Romantico (2006)
- Be My Love: Female, Pt. 3 (2006)

== Selected composer filmography ==
=== Film ===
- Ninja III: The Domination (1984)
- The Last Dragon (1985)
- KGB: The Secret War (1985)
- Young Lady Chatterley II (1985)
- Steele Justice (1986)
- The New Adventures of Pippi Longstocking (1988)
- The Phantom of the Opera (1989)
- For My Father (2008)
- The Human Centipede 3 (Final Sequence) (2015)
- Clinger (2015)
- Legend of the Demon Cat (2017)
- Frank & Ava (2018)
- The Lurker (2019)

=== Television ===
- The Facts of Life Goes to Paris (1982)
- Baby Makes Five (1983, 4 episodes)
- ABC Afterschool Specials (1982-1990, 5 episodes)
- CBS Schoolbreak Special (1984-1991, 6 episodes)
