= Disengagement (film) =

- © 2007 Studio Canal
- Directed by: Amos Gitai
- Written by: Amos Gitai; Marie-Jose Sanselme
- Produced by: Nicolas Blanc; Laurent Truchot; Pierfrancesco Fiorenza
- Starring: Juliette Binoche; Jeanne Moreau; Dana Ivgy; Liron Levo
- Cinematography: Christian Berger
- Edited by: Isabelle Ingold
- Distributed by: Studio Canal
- Release date: September 6, 2007 (Venice Film Festival)
- Running time: 115 minutes
- Countries: France; Israel
- Languages: English; French; Hebrew

Disengagement (Désengagement) is a film directed by Amos Gitai, starring Juliette Binoche, with Jeanne Moreau in a supporting role. The film is a French/Italian/Israeli co-production, and was shot in France, Germany and Israel. It is the third film of Gitai's "Border" or "Frontier" trilogy.

The singer Barbara Hendricks appears in the film in a small role, performing Gustav Mahler's Song of the Earth.

The film premiered at the 2007 Venice Film Festival in an out-of-competition slot, where it won the Roberto Rossellini Award. The picture was then screened at the 2007 Toronto International Film Festival.

== Synopsis ==
Following the death of her father, Ana (Binoche) and her adopted brother Uli (Liron Levo) meet in Avignon. It is stated in her father's will that Ana cannot receive her inheritance until she has found the child she abandoned as a teenager. This journey leads her to Gaza during the 2005 Israeli disengagement, a time fraught with danger and uncertainty.

== Cast ==
- Juliette Binoche as Ana
- Liron Levo as Uli
- Jeanne Moreau as Françoise
- Barbara Hendricks as Barbara
- Dana Ivgy as Dana
- Hiam Abbass as Hiam
- Tomer Russo as Tomer
- Israel Katorza as Israel
- Yussuf Abu-Warda as Youssef
- Uri Klauzner as Uri
- Amos Gitai

== Critical reception ==
The film received largely positive reviews from Variety and Screen International.
