= Kedma (film) =

- Directed by: Amos Gitai
- Written by: Mordechai Goldhecht; Amos Gitai
- Produced by: Marin Karmitz; Amos Gitai
- Starring: Andrei Kashkar; Helena Yaralova; Yussuf Abu-Warda; Moni Moshonov; Juliano Mer-Khamis
- Cinematography: Giorgos Arvanitis
- Edited by: Kobi Netanel
- Music by: David Darling; Manfred Eicher
- Distributed by: Celluloid Dreams
- Release date: May 22, 2002
- Running time: 100 minutes
- Country: Israel
- Languages: Hebrew; Arabic; French; German; Polish; Russian; Yiddish

Kedma is a 2002 Israeli film directed by Amos Gitai and starring Andrei Kashkar and Helena Yaralova. It was entered into the 2002 Cannes Film Festival.

== Plot ==
The film is a historical tragedy set during the opening stages of Israel's 1948 War of Independence. The film takes place in the final stages of the civil war in Mandatory Palestine just before Israeli independence. It follows the fate of a group of Polish-, Russian-, and Yiddish-speaking refugees from the Holocaust who are illegally brought to Israel by the Palmach. When they arrive, they are chased by British soldiers. Once they escape, they are immediately drafted into the war, and take part in a grueling battle against Arab irregulars. Toward its ending, the film centers on two long monologues: one by an Arab peasant (played by Yussuf Abu-Warda) who pledges to oppose the Jews forever, in a reworking of a poem by Tawfiq Ziad; and one by an emotionally demolished refugee who laments the seemingly endless suffering of his people.

Gitai intended the film to be a more realistic answer to the romanticized depiction of the war in Otto Preminger's Exodus. The final shot of Kedma, with a trail of military vehicles disappearing into the horizon, is identical to the final shot of Preminger's film.
