= Promised Land (2004 film) =

2004 French-Israeli film by Amos Gitai

- Film poster
- Hebrew: הארץ המובטחת
- Directed by: Amos Gitaï
- Written by: Amos Gitai, Marie-Jose Sanselme
- Produced by: Amos Gitaï, Michael Tapuach
- Starring: Rosamund Pike, Diana Bespechni, Hanna Schygulla
- Cinematography: Caroline Champetier
- Edited by: Yann Dedet, Isabelle Ingold
- Music by: Simon Stockhausen
- Production companies: Agav Hafekot Agav Productions, MP Productions
- Release date: 2004
- Running time: 88 min
- Countries: France; Israel
- Languages: Russian, Hebrew, Arabic, English

Promised Land (Hebrew: הארץ המובטחת) is a 2004 French-Israeli film, directed by Amos Gitai and starring Rosamund Pike, Diana Bespechni, and Hanna Schygulla. It tells the story of a group of East European girls smuggled into Israel to serve as prostitutes. The film is the first of Gitai's "Frontier" trilogy and premiered at the Venice Film Festival.

Director Gitai commented on the film: "If I have succeeded in spoiling even one man's appetite, and causing him to stop going to prostitutes - then I feel I have succeeded in doing something."

== Synopsis ==
The film opens at night in the Sinai desert. Under the moonlight, a group of men and women warm themselves around a campfire. Women come from Eastern Europe expecting to work as prostitutes in nice hotels in Egypt. Tomorrow they will suffer rape, humiliation and will be auctioned off by a Frenchwoman named Anne. They will pass from hand to hand, victims of a network of prostitution, eventually being smuggled into Israel to work in a Red Sea resort nightclub.

One night, at the brothel, Diana meets an English woman called Rose. She begs her for help. Their meeting is a sign of hope in the plight of these women.

== Cast ==
- Rosamund Pike : Rose
- Diana Bespechni : Diana
- Anne Parillaud : Anne
- Hanna Schygulla : Hanna
- Yussuf Abu-Warda : Yussuf
- Amos Lavie : Hezi

== Awards ==
- CinemAvvenire Award, Cinema for Peace Award at the 2004 Venice Film Festival.
