= For My Father =

2008 film

- סוף שבוע בתל אביב
- Directed by: Dror Zahavi
- Written by: Ido Dror; Dror Zahavi
- Starring: Shredi Jabarin
- Cinematography: Carl-Friedrich Koschnick
- Music by: Misha Segal
- Release dates: 20 June 2008 (Moscow); 13 July 2008 (Israel)
- Running time: 100 minutes
- Country: Israel
- Language: Hebrew

For My Father, known in Israel as Sof Shavua B'Tel Aviv (Hebrew: סוף שבוע בתל אביב, A Weekend in Tel Aviv) is a 2008 Israeli drama film directed by Dror Zahavi. It was entered into the 30th Moscow International Film Festival.

== Cast ==
- Shredi Jabarin as Tarek (as Shredy Jabarin)
- Hili Yalon as Keren
- Shlomo Vishinsky as Katz
- Jony Arbid as Abed (as Joni Arvid)
- Shadi Fahr-Al-Din as Salim
- Rozina Cambos as Zipora
- Dina Golan as Sara
- Chaim Banai as Rehavia (as Haim Banai)
- Oren Yadger as Shaul
- Michael Moshonov as Shlomi
