= Alila (film) =

2003 film by Amos Gitai

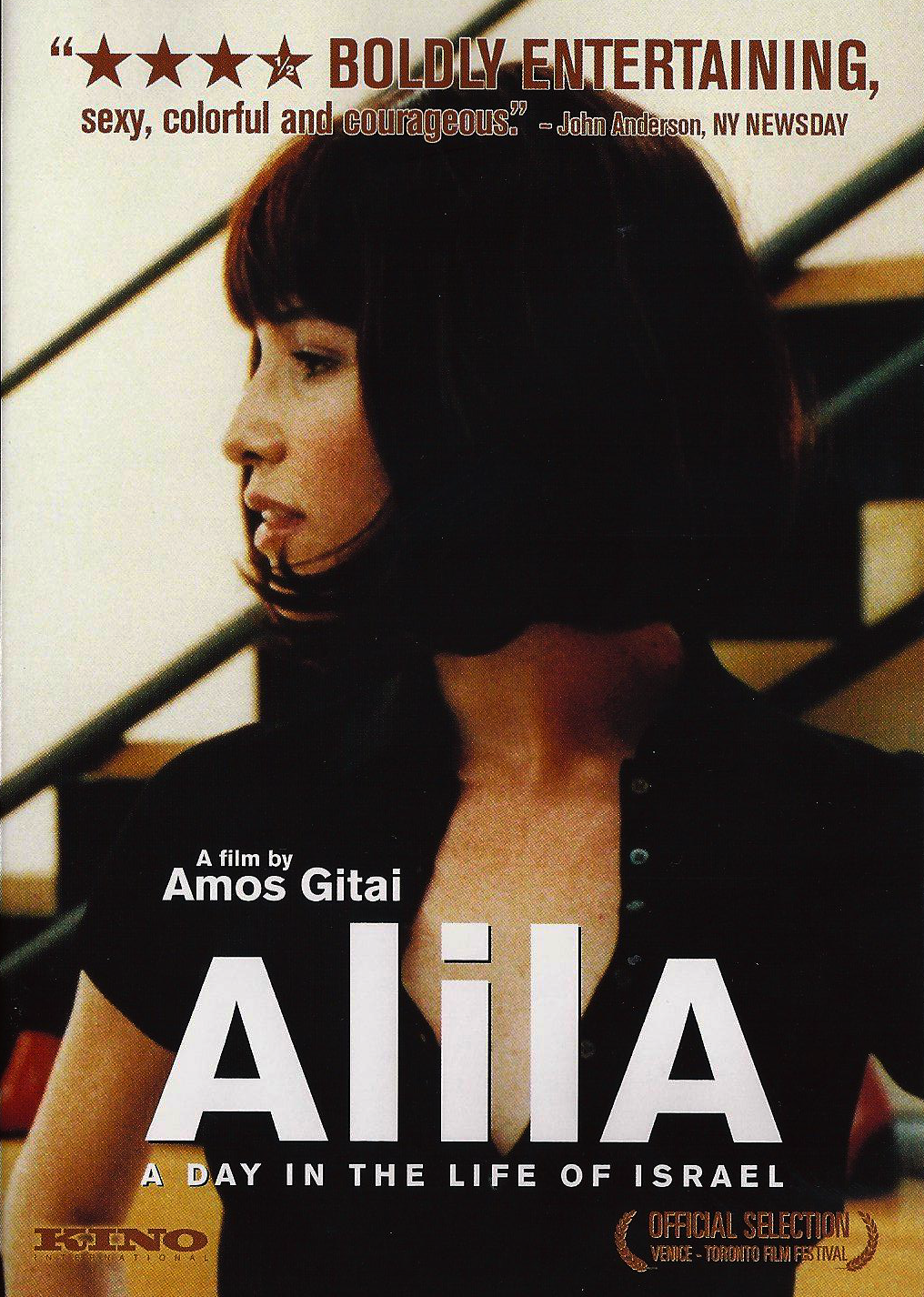
- Theatrical release poster
- Directed by: Amos Gitai
- Written by: Amos Gitai; Yehoshua Kenaz (novel)
- Produced by: Alain Mamou-Mani
- Starring: Yael Abecassis; Hanna Laslo; Uri Klauzner; Ronit Elkabetz
- Cinematography: Renato Berta
- Edited by: Monica Coleman; Kobi Netanel
- Music by: Pri Ganech
- Distributed by: Mars Distribution
- Release date: 12 September 2003
- Running time: 121 min
- Countries: Israel; France
- Language: Hebrew
- Box office: $48,500

Alila is a 2003 Israeli film directed by Amos Gitai and starring Yaël Abecassis, Uri Klauzner, and Hanna Laslo. The drama follows half a dozen very different characters through their lives in modern-day Israel, giving Gitai an opportunity to comment on his country's top social issues.

The film received mixed reviews. Newsday called it, "sexy, colorful, courageous and boldly entertaining," and the Village Voice called the director "Israel's one man new wave"; Stephen Holden of The New York Times stated: "There really isn't a likable character in the movie, which opens today in Manhattan. The filmmaker's jaundiced view of humanity is matched by his eye for the ugly".

== Plot ==
Instead of written credits at the beginning of the film, Gitai reads out the credits, introduces himself to the viewer, and explains that Alila is based on the novel Returning Lost Love. The rest of the movie is made up of forty individual single-shot scenes depicting the lives of several Israelis. The characters' lives overlap and collide. Gabi, a bobbed haired sexpot, and her lover Hezi—who is older, balding and married—rent a room to have an affair, while Ezra, a pot-bellied divorcee, supervises an illegal construction site next door. All this racket drives Schwartz, a Holocaust survivor, to a mental breakdown. Other characters include illegal immigrants, a teenage boy who's afraid to serve in the army, and a corrupt police officer. In each scene the camera moves through walls, over desks, and around rooms in order to keep the focus on the character it is following, in moments of drama as well as in moments of mundane daily activity.

== Cast ==
- Yael Abecassis as Gabi
- Hanna Laslo as Mali
- Ronit Elkabetz as Ronit
- Uri Klauzner as Ezra
- Amos Lavi as Hezi
- Lupo Berkowitch as Aviram
- Liron Levo as Ilan
- Yosef Carmon as Schwartz
- Amit Mestechkin as Eyal
- Lyn Hsiao Zamir as Linda
- Tomer Russo as Officer
- Carmel Betto as Carmel
- Dalit Kahan as Sharon
- Kobi Zahavi as Kiosk owner
- Eyal Elhadad as Locksmith

== Reception ==
Alila received mostly mixed reviews, with a score of 57 on Metacritic and a 41% "rotten" rating on Rotten Tomatoes. The film is said to have an "Altman-esque fabric" and a "Kiarostamian spirit"

Some reviewers point to the film's political tone and social commentary about modern Israel. One reviewer goes so far as to compare Gitai to Michael Moore. It's assumed that Gitai's film will resonate most with Israelis, but offer outsiders an intimate look at the nation.

Many reviews also comment on the sense of chaos in Gitai's film. Noisy people, their excitement and clamor, and the hop scotch from one story line to another creates a bustle in the film that's consistent throughout. Lewis Beale, of Film Journal International, writes, "It's a very Mediterranean atmosphere, in which everyone seems to love hard, hate with intensity and speak at the top of their lungs." This chaos, however, was not to all reviewers tastes. Peter Howell, of the Toronto Star simply stated that "It's a bit of a mess".

== Awards ==
Alila was nominated for two awards from the Israeli Film Academy in 2003:

- Best Costume Design – Laura Dinolesko
- Best Supporting Actress – Hana Laszlo

Alila was nominated for one award from the Valladolid International Film Festival in 2003:

- Golden Spike – director Amos Gitai

Alila was nominated for one award from the Venice Film Festival in 2003:

- Golden Lion – director Amos Gitai
