= Laila in Haifa =

2020 film

- Film poster
- Directed by: Amos Gitai
- Written by: Amos Gitai; Marie-José Sanselme
- Produced by: Amos Gitai; Laurent Truchot; Catherine Dussart
- Starring: Maria Zreik; Khawla Ibraheem; Bahira Ablassi; Naama Preis; Tsahi Halevi; Makram J. Khoury
- Cinematography: Éric Gautier
- Edited by: Yuval Orr
- Music by: Aleksey Kochetkov
- Production companies: Agav Films; CDP; United King Films
- Release date: 7 September 2020 (Venice)
- Running time: 99 minutes
- Countries: Israel; France
- Languages: Hebrew; Arabic; English

Laila in Haifa (Hebrew title: לילה בחיפה, Layla BeHaifa (Note: The Hebrew title is a pun: Hebrew: לילה may also mean "night".)) is a 2020 Israeli-French comedy-drama film directed by Amos Gitai. It was selected to be shown in the main competition section of the 77th Venice International Film Festival.

The events of the film take place over one night in a club in Haifa, Israel. The club Fattoush is the place where people of different background meet, as the director of the film puts it: "men and women, straight and gay, Jews and Arabs, radical and moderate".

== Cast ==
- Tzachi Halevy as Gil
- Maria Zreik as Laila
- Khawla Ibraheem as Khawla
- Bahira Ablassi as Bahira
- Naama Preis as Naama
- Hana Laszlo as Hanna
- Makram Khoury as Kamal
- Clara Khoury as Roberta
- Hisham Sulliman as Hisham
- Tom Baum as Tom
- Amir Khoury as Amir
- Asher Lax as Asher
- Andrzej Seweryn as Andre
