= Yuval Scharf =

Israeli stage and screen actress and model

- יובל שרף
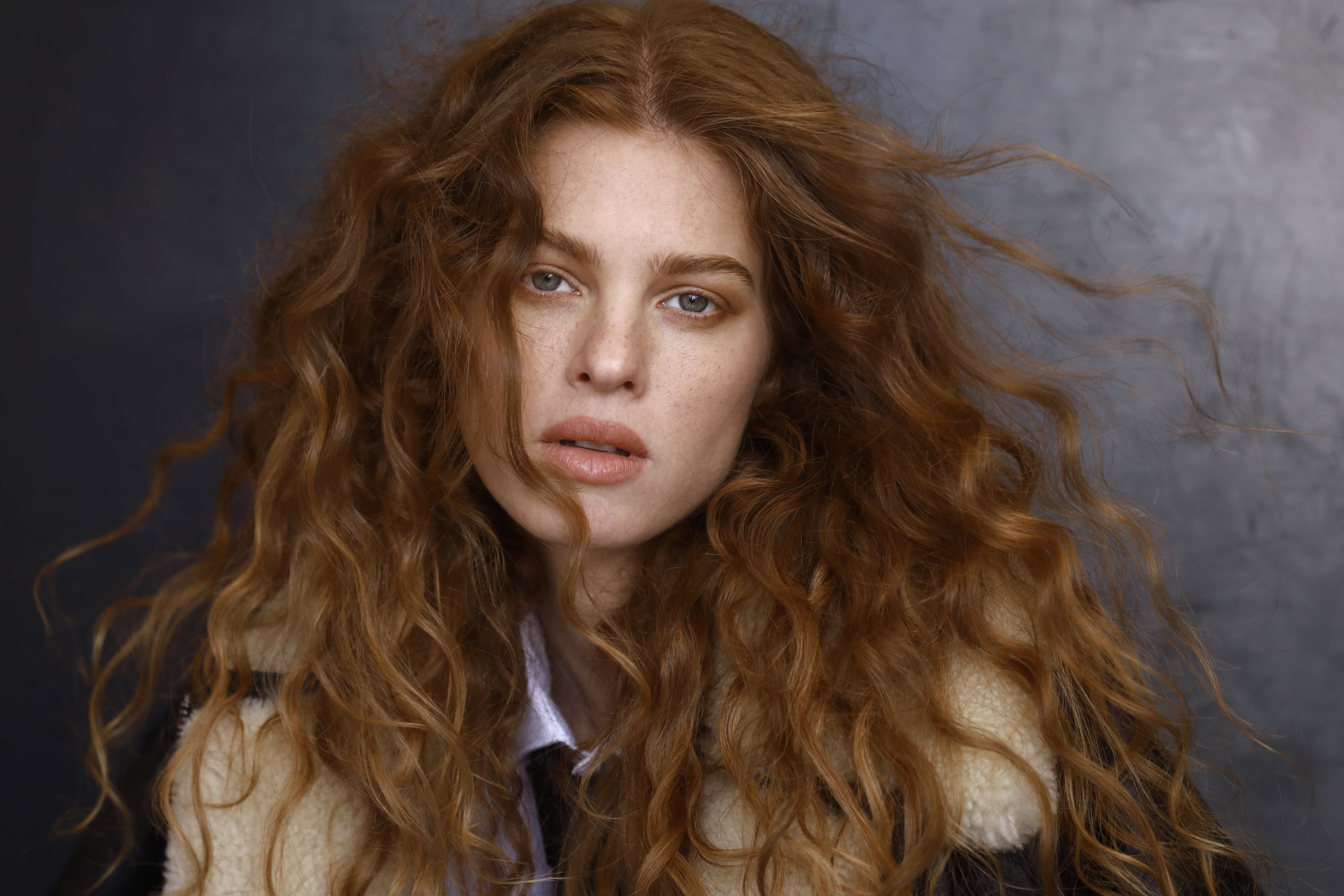
- Scharf in 2024
- Born: 4 June 1985 (age 41); Even Yehuda, Israel

Yuval Scharf (Hebrew: יובל שרף; born 4 June 1985) is an Israeli film, television and theatre actress, and model.

== Early life ==
Scharf was born in Tel Aviv, Israel, to a family of Ashkenazi Jewish (Polish-Jewish) background.

== Career ==
=== Television and Cinema ===
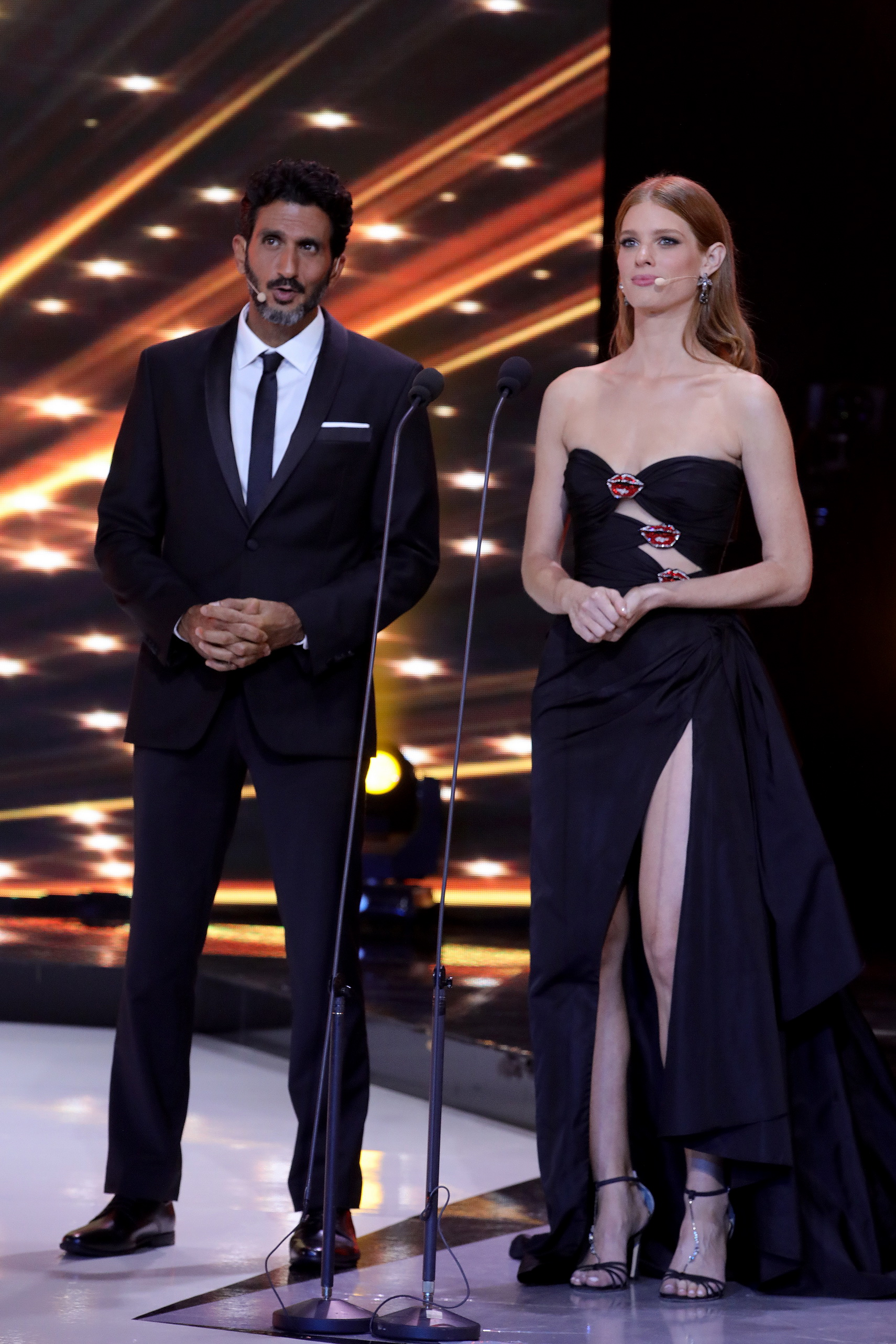
Tzachi Halevy (left) and Yuval Scharf hosting the 2019 Ophir Awards

In 2008 she played in Lost Islands. In 2013 she played Yael, a young journalist in the film Ana Arabia. In 2015 she played Mira in Moon in the 12th House. In 2018, she played Tanya in the BBC drama McMafia. She plays Rochel, an Ashkenazi love interest of a Sephardic Israeli, in the TV show Beauty Queen of Jerusalem. In 2023, she played Mossad agent Sarah in Ghosts of Beirut.

=== Theatre ===
At the Beit Lessin Theater she participated in several plays: In 2008, she played Jill in the play Aquus and was part of the cast in the play Alma and Ruth; in 2009 she participated in the play Conditions of Affection and in 2010 in the play Uncle Vanya.
