= Dror Zahavi =

Israeli film director (born 1959)

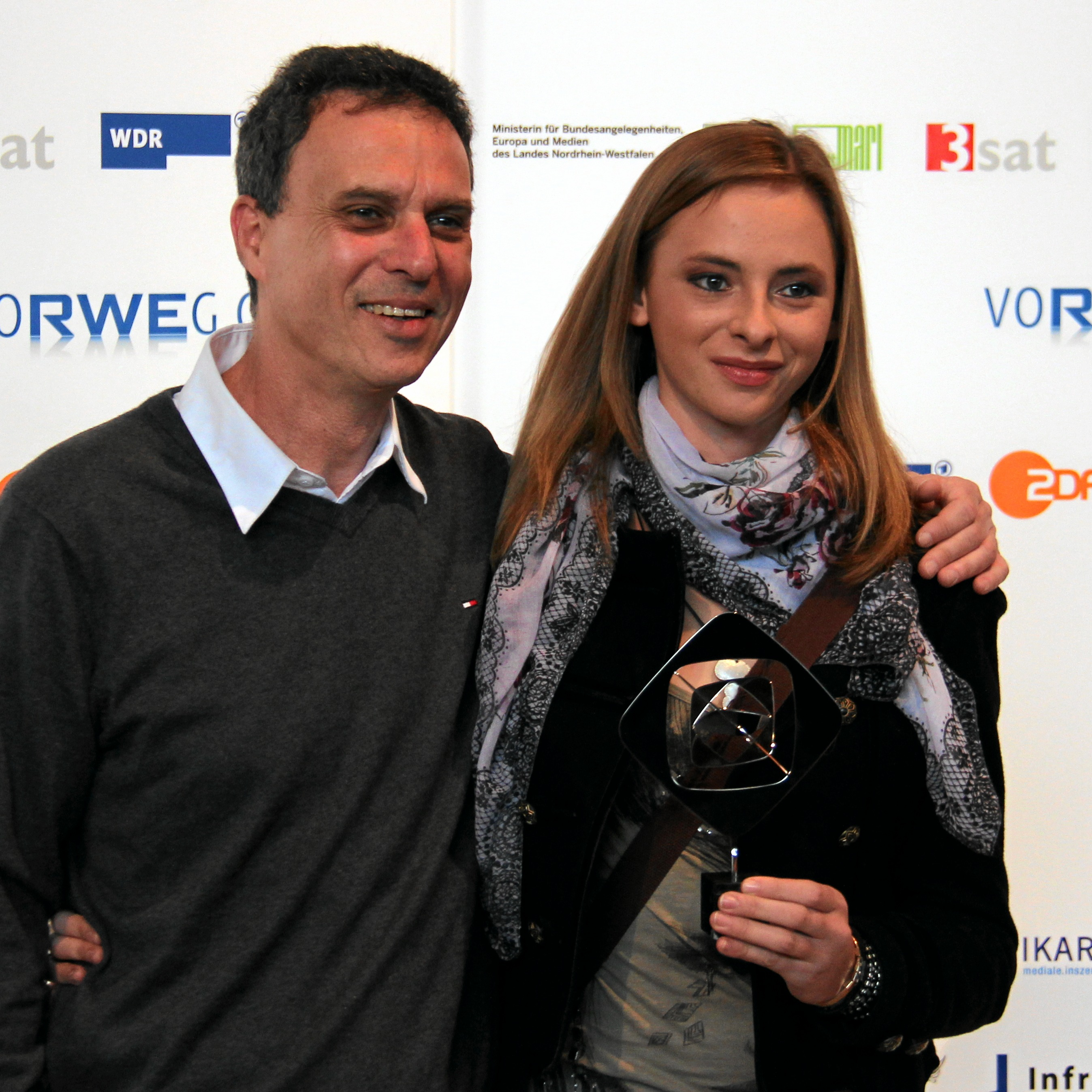
- Dror Zahavi (left) in 2011
- Born: 6 February 1959 (age 67); Tel Aviv, Israel
- Occupations: Film director, screenwriter
- Years active: 1992–present

Dror Zahavi (born 6 February 1959) is an Israeli film director and screenwriter. He has directed more than 25 films and television shows since 1992. His 2008 film, For My Father, was entered into the 30th Moscow International Film Festival.

== Selected filmography ==
- Kissing My Sister (2000, TV film)
- The Man Next Door (2001, TV film)
- Unpleasant Encounter in the Moonlight (2004, TV film)
- The Airlift (2005, TV film)
- The Hunt for Troy (2007, TV film)
- For My Father (2008)
- The Author of Himself: The Life of Marcel Reich-Ranicki (2009, TV film)
- Civil Courage (2010, TV film)
- Never Again (2011, TV film)
- Munich '72 (2012, TV film)
- Alles muss raus – Eine Familie rechnet ab (2014, TV film)
- Family! (2016, TV film)
