= Rabin, the Last Day =

- French release poster
- Directed by: Amos Gitai
- Written by: Amos Gitai; Marie-José Sanselme
- Produced by: Jean-Baptiste Dupont; Cyril Colbeau-Justin; Sylvie Pialat; Francesco Di Silvio; Amos Gitai
- Cinematography: Eric Gautier
- Edited by: Yuval Orr; Tahel Sofer; Isabelle Ingold
- Music by: Amit Poznansky
- Production companies: LGM Cinéma; Les Films du Worso; France 2 Cinéma; Orange Studio; Hamon Hafakot; Agav Films
- Distributed by: Le Pacte (France)
- Release dates: 7 September 2015 (Venice); 4 November 2015 (Israel); 16 December 2015 (France)
- Running time: 153 minutes
- Countries: Israel; France
- Languages: Hebrew; English
- Budget: $4.6 million

Rabin, the Last Day is a 2015 Israeli-French docudrama political thriller film directed by Amos Gitai. It was selected to compete for the Golden Lion at the 72nd Venice International Film Festival.

== Plot ==
The film depicts the events leading up to the assassination of Israeli Prime Minister Yitzhak Rabin on November 4, 1995. It follows and presents the stories of various characters on Rabin's last day, from the early morning hours until the moment of his death: the security agents, the political advisors, the religious extremists, the assassin, and his victim. The film integrates archival footage, amateur recordings, news segments, and dramatized scenes.

== Cast ==
- Yitzhak Hiskiya as chairman
- Pini Mittelman as commission member
- Michael Warshaviak as commission member
- Einat Weizman as commission lawyer
- Yogev Yefet as Rabin's murderer
- Tomer Sisley as Rabin's driver
- Rotem Keinan as commission lawyer
- Tomer Russo as hospital director
- Uri Gottlieb as attorney general
- Ruti Asarsai as police spokeswoman
- Dalia Shimko as psychiatrist
- Gdalya Besser as police officer
- Odelia More as teacher
- Eldad Prywes as Rabin's bodyguard
- Shalom Shmuelov as intelligence officer
- Mali Levi as journalist
- Stephen D. Root as journalist
- Liron Levo as soldier
- Yona Rosenkier as rallye driver
- Yael Abecassis as interviewer
- Shimon Peres as himself

== Reception ==
Rabin, the Last Day has a score of 61% on Metacritic. The Playlist gave the film a grade of B+, describing it as "deeply absorbing and intelligent". The Hollywood Reporter wrote that the film "benefits from fine technical work throughout, from Eric Gautier's sober cinematography to a soulful musical theme by Amit Poznansky". Jonathan Romney of Screendaily considered the film as one of Gitai's "most ambitious and compelling works yet", noting that the film's "slow, deliberate approach makes for a detached air which allows Gitai to show events with distinct clarity".
