= Ana Arabia =

- Directed by: Amos Gitai
- Written by: Amos Gitai
- Cinematography: Giora Bejach
- Release date: September 2, 2013 (Venice)

Ana Arabia ("I Am Arab") is a 2013 French-Israeli drama film written and directed by Amos Gitai. It was entered into the main competition at the 70th Venice International Film Festival. It consists of a single long take.

== Synopsis ==
The story follows seven characters living in a small enclave between Jaffa and Bat-Yam, the last area not yet transformed into real estate property. In a small orchard with several structures used for living and as a makeshift garage, a small community lives at their own laid-back pace, different from that of the surrounding city.

A young journalist named Yael (Yuval Scharf) arrives to investigate a mysterious story surrounding the death of the family matriarch, Anna, who was born in a concentration camp in Poland and later married Yusuf after arriving in Israel.

== Cast ==
- Yuval Scharf: Yael
- Yussuf Abu-Warda: Yussuf
- Sarah Adler: Miriam
- Asi Levi: Sarah
- Uri Gavriel: Hassan
- Norman Issa: Norman
