= Free Zone (film) =

- Directed by: Amos Gitai
- Written by: Amos Gitai; Marie-Jose Sanselme
- Produced by: Nicolas Blanc; Michael Tapuah; Laurent Truchot
- Starring: Natalie Portman; Hiam Abbass; Hanna Laslo
- Cinematography: Laurent Brunet
- Distributed by: BAC Films
- Release date: June 9, 2005
- Running time: 93 minutes
- Country: Israel
- Languages: English; Hebrew
- Box office: $32,381

Free Zone is a 2005 film directed by Amos Gitai. Shot in Israel and Jordan, the Israeli-Belgian-French-Spanish production stars Israeli Jewish actress Hanna Laslo, Palestinian actress Hiam Abbass, and Israeli-American actress Natalie Portman. It is the second film of Gitai's "Border" or "Frontier" trilogy.

The film made its debut at the 2005 Cannes Film Festival on May 19, 2005. It was released in Israel on June 9, 2005, and then appeared at numerous other film festivals throughout the rest of the year, with a limited release on December 16, 2005, in the United States.

== Plot ==
Rebecca (Natalie Portman) is a young American woman who has lived in Jerusalem for several months. She has just ended her marriage with a Jewish man, Breitberg, after he tells her of having raped a Palestinian woman while he was a soldier. Rebecca herself has a Jewish father but a gentile mother and so, despite her Jewish upbringing, is not considered a Jew according to religious tradition. Crying openly, Rebecca enters a tourist cab, driven by a Jewish Israeli woman, Hanna (Hanna Laslo), who is the daughter of Holocaust survivors. Hanna's destination, to which Rebecca agrees to accompany her, is the free-trade zone or "Free Zone" near Jordan's borders with Syria, Iraq, and Saudi Arabia to collect money owed to her husband, who has recently been wounded in a rocket attack. Upon reaching the Free Zone, they meet up with Laila (Hiam Abbass), a Palestinian woman who serves as the contact for Hanna's husband's black market partnership with a man known as "the American." The three women set off on a tense journey to retrieve Hanna's money and to find the American's son, Walid, who may have absconded with the money.

The film is bookended by a rendition of the traditional Passover song "Had Gadya", performed by Chava Alberstein. The song "Ain Ani" by Shotei Hanevua also plays in the taxi at the end of the film.

== Cast ==
- Natalie Portman as Rebecca. Partly Israeli, partly American, she left New York City to live in Jerusalem but has no family of her own there.
- Hanna Laslo as Hanna. After being expelled from Sinai, she established with her husband in the Negev.
- Hiam Abbass as Leila. A Palestinian Arab, rejected by her own son for her modern mores.
- Carmen Maura as Mrs. Breitberg. The mother of Julio. In the final cut, she only appears in a superimposed flashback.
- Makram Khoury as Samir, the American. A Palestinian orphan who was a refugee in Texas. Now living as a car trader in a Free Zone oasis.
- Aki Avni as Julio. Rebecca's former fiancé of Spanish-Jewish origin. They separated after he told her that he had raped a Palestinian refugee during a military operation.
- Liron Levo as military officer in the border with Jordan.

== Reception ==
Free Zone received negative reviews from critics. Review aggregator Rotten Tomatoes reports that 26% of critics gave the film a positive review based on 46 reviews, with an average score of 5/10. The website's consensus reads, "The symbolism in this cinematic metaphor on conflicts in the Middle East becomes so overbearing that it's hard to care about the characters or their plight."

== Awards ==
In the 2005 Cannes Film Festival, Hanna Laslo won the Best Actress award, and the film was nominated for the Palme d'Or. The president of the jury said afterward he considered honoring all three Free Zone actresses with an award for best ensemble acting.

== Controversy ==
During filming at Jerusalem's Western Wall on February 23, 2005, the Israeli police asked actors and film crew to leave after protests from Orthodox Jews who were praying there while the crew filmed a kissing scene between Natalie Portman and Israeli actor Aki Avni. The scene was not included in the final cut of the film.
