= Lea Koenig =

Israeli actress (born 1929)

- ליא קניג; ליאַ קעניג
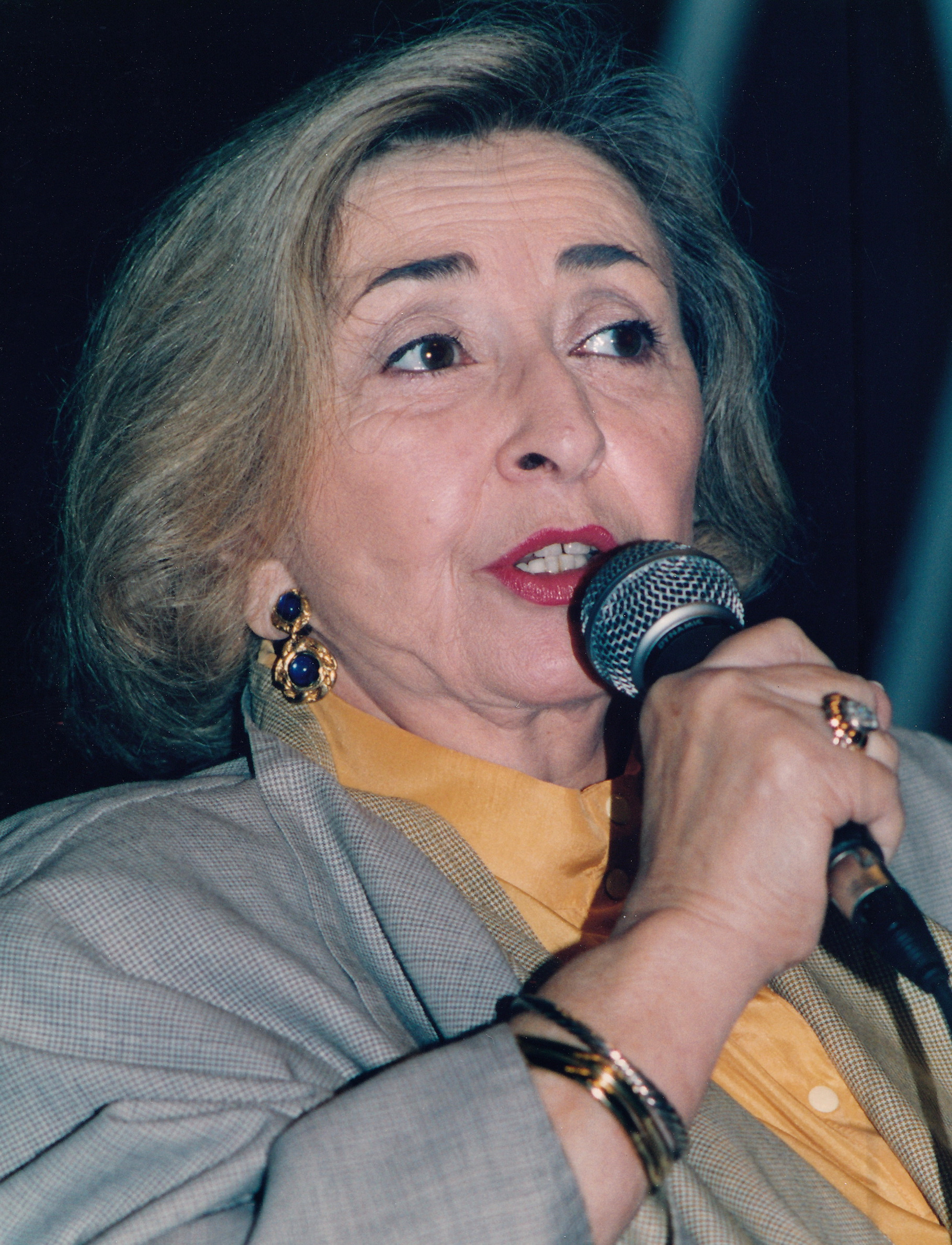
- Koenig circa 1999 or 2000
- Born: Lea Kamien; 30 November 1929 (age 96); Łódź, Poland
- Education: Bucharest National University of Arts
- Occupation: Actress
- Years active: 1948–present
- Spouse: Zvi Hirshl Stolper

Lea Koenig (or Lia Koenig; Hebrew: ליא קניג, Yiddish: ליאַ קעניג; born Lea Kamien; 30 November 1929) is an Israeli actress, nicknamed The First Lady of Israeli Theatre.

== Biography ==
Lea Koenig was born in 1929 in Łódź, Poland, to a secular Jewish family of Ashkenazi Jewish descent. Her parents were the Yiddish actors Dina and Józef Kamień. She spent her childhood in Poland, then in Tashkent, in the Uzbek Soviet Socialist Republic. Her father was murdered in the Holocaust. In the end of the 1940s, Lea Koenig with her mother emigrated to Romania, where she began studying at National University of Arts in Bucharest and debuted at Jewish Theatre. In 1961, she emigrated to Israel.

Primarily acting in Hebrew, Koenig performs in Israel and all over the world also in Yiddish theaters. She speaks English, Hebrew, German, Polish, Romanian, Russian and Yiddish.

== Awards and honors ==
- In 1987, Koenig was awarded the Israel Prize for acting.
- Both the Tel Aviv University and Bar-Ilan University have conferred Honorary Doctorates on her.
- In 2012 she received the EMET Prize for art and culture
- In 2018 Koenig was honored as one of the ceremonial torchbearers for Israel's 70th Independence Day

== See also ==
- List of Israel Prize recipients
