= Amos Gitai =

Israeli film director and screenwriter

- Born: 11 October 1950 (age 76); Haifa, Israel
- Education: Technion; University of California, Berkeley
- Occupations: Filmmaker; author
- Years active: 1973–present
- Spouse: Rivka Gitai (m. 1980)
- Parent: Munio Weinraub
- Website: amosgitai.com

Amos Gitai (Hebrew: עמוס גיתאי) is an Israeli artist and filmmaker, born 11 October 1950 in Haifa, Israel.

Gitai's work was presented in several major retrospectives in Pompidou Center in Paris, the Museum of Modern Art (MoMA) and Lincoln Center in New York, and the British Film Institute in London. To date, Amos Gitai has created over 90 works of art, including a wide variety of formats such as feature and short films, fiction and documentaries, experimental work, television productions, installations and theater works.

Between 1999 and 2017 eleven of his films participated in the Cannes Film Festival for the Palme d'Or as well as The Venice International Film Festival for the Golden Lion award.

He has worked with Juliette Binoche, Jeanne Moreau, Natalie Portman, Hana Laszlo, Yael Abecassis, Samuel Fuller, Hanna Schygulla, Annie Lennox, Rosamund Pike, Barbara Hendricks, Léa Seydoux, Valeria Bruni Tedeschi, Irene Jacob, Henri Alekan, Mathieu Amalric, Pippo Delbono Renato Berta, Nurith Aviv, Éric Gautier and more. Since 2000 he has been collaborating with the French screenwriter Marie-José Sanselme.

He has received several awards, including the Roberto Rossellini Prize (2005), the Leopard of Honor at the Locarno International Film Festival (2008), the Robert Bresson Prize (2013), the Paradjanov Prize (2014), and the Lucchino Visconti Prize (2021). He is a Commander des Arts and Letters and a Chevalier de la Légion d'honneur (2017). In 2018, Amos Gitai was elected professor of artistic creation at the Collège de France, with a series of nine lectures on cinema, followed by a symposium.

Amos Gitai has been working for approximately 40 years. His work also includes video installations, theatre productions and books. While the work is indeed varied, this diversity is extremely coherent. Over the years, Amos Gitaï articulates and re-articulates works which never cease to respond to and echo each other. He continues to explore new narrative and stylistic avenues, always in relation to contemporary reality, even when the narrative takes a detour into the historical or mythological past.

Amos Gitai has often spoken about the civic role of artists in society: "Sometimes art acts with a delay, preserving memory, the memory that those in power would like to erase because they call for obedience and do not want to be disturbed, they do not want dissent. But if artists remain true to their inner voice, they produce work that travels through time."

== Early life ==
Gitai was born to Munio Weinraub, an architect formed at the pre-war German Bauhaus art school, and to Efratia Margalit, an intellectual, a storyteller and a teacher. He graduated from the Hebrew Reali School in Haifa in 1968. He holds a degree in architecture from the Technion in Haifa and a PhD in architecture from the University of California, Berkeley.

In 1973, during the Yom Kippur War, Gitai had to interrupt his architecture studies as he was called up to the reserve service as part of a helicopter rescue crew. Gitai was wounded when the helicopter he was in was hit by a Syrian missile. During his missions, he used a Super 8 camera to document the war. After the war, he embarked on a career as a filmmaker and made his first documentary in 1980, House.

== Film career ==
Gitai began his career directing mostly documentaries. In 1980 he directed his first full-length film House, which follows a house in West Jerusalem, abandoned during the 1948 war by its Palestinian owner. In the film, Gitai follows the different house tenants over the years, making the house the focus of the Israeli socio-political conflict. It opens a democratic cinematic space around the same house where a split of perspectives on the situation and its history takes place.

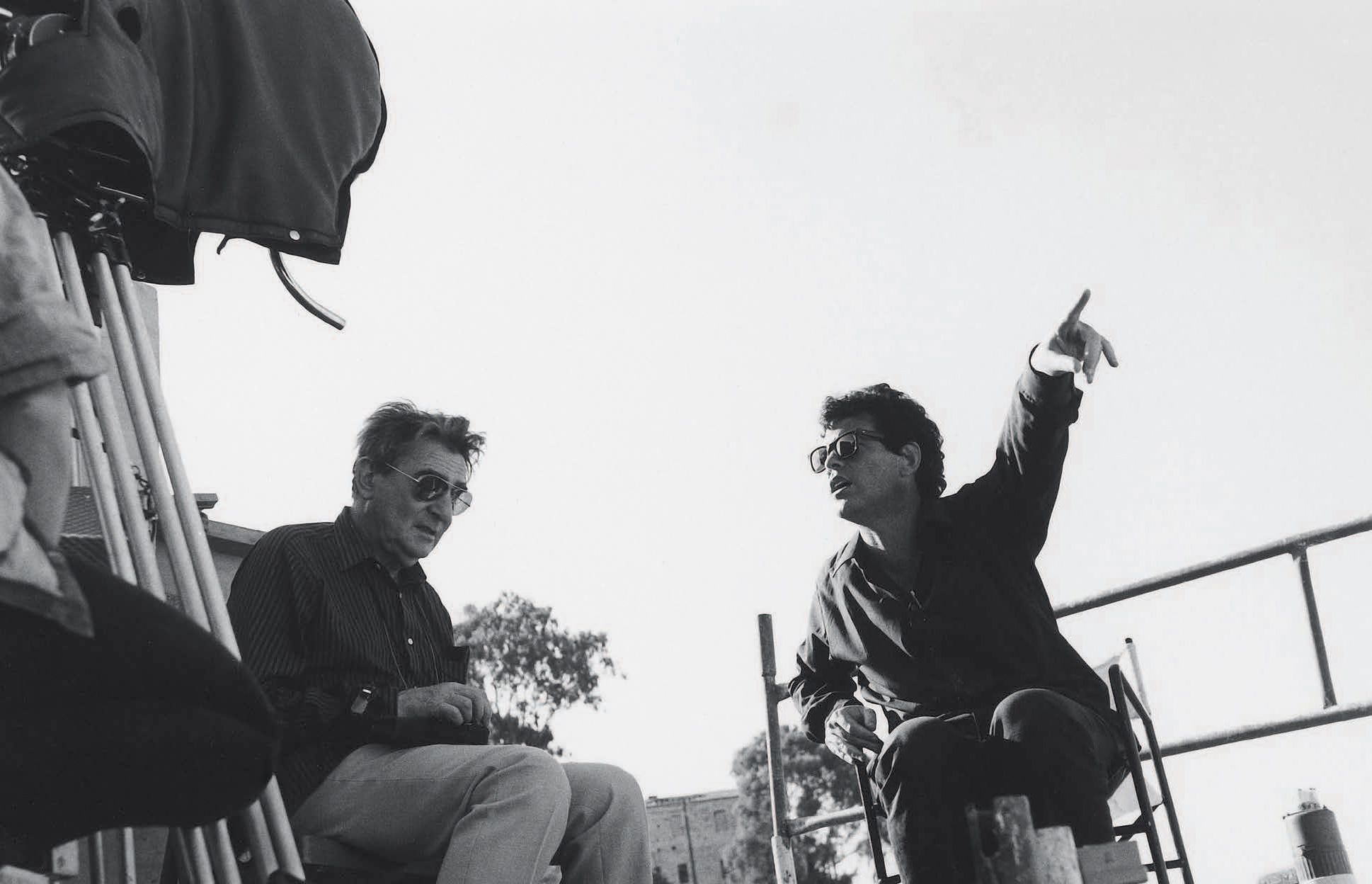
Amos Gitai and Henri Alekan, shooting Esther, 1986.

Gitaï wants this house to be both a symbol and something very concrete; he wants it to become a character in a film. He achieves one of the most beautiful things a camera can register 'live', as it were; people who look at the same thing but see different things – and who are moved by that vision. In this crumbling shell of a house, real hallucinations begin to take shape. The film's central idea is simple and the film has simply the force of that idea, no more, no less."

— Serge Daney, Libération, 1.3.1982

The film was rejected and censored by Israeli television, an event which marked the filmmaker's conflictual relationship with the authorities of his country. It was to make this film exist despite the censorship and to continue along the path he had just begun, that he said at that time: "I decided to become a filmmaker". This relationship was soon to be fueled by the controversy surrounding his film Field Diary, made before and during the invasion of Lebanon in 1982, and resulting in a long exile in France (1983–1993).

House was the first part of a trilogy including the films A House in Jerusalem (1998), and News from Home / News from House (2005). It was the first of many trilogies; a concept Gitai consistently worked with during his career, offering a complex and layered view of the geopolitical Israeli reality.

To his biographical elements (his family origins, the generation to which he belongs, his architectural studies, the making of the House and its effects) must be added the experience of the Yom Kippur War, in which he nearly died at the age of 23, and which would shape all his subsequent work. The traumatic event itself became the subject of a series of experimental short films and documentaries, before he directed Yom Kippur in 2000. The film's positive reception at the Cannes Film Festival brought him widespread recognition and confirmed his place as a major voice in world cinema. The way this intimate yet collective experience is rendered through a striking visual sensibility is characteristic of Gitai's approach. The film also marks the beginning of his long collaboration with screenwriter Marie-José Sanselme, which has continued to the present day.

He continues with the making of the three Wadi (Wadi 1981, Wadi Ten Years After 1991, Wadi Grand Canyon 2001) which similar to House is dealing with a specific location and examines the complex relationships between the residents of the former stone quarry – Eastern European immigrants, survivors of the camps and Arabs who have also been expelled from their homes due to the wars in Israel. Gitai turns the valley into a symbol of a possible coexistence.

His third trilogy deals with Israeli political-military practices (Field Diary, 1982; Giving Peace a Chance, 1994; The Arena of Murder, 1996). Yann Lardeau wrote about Field Diary:

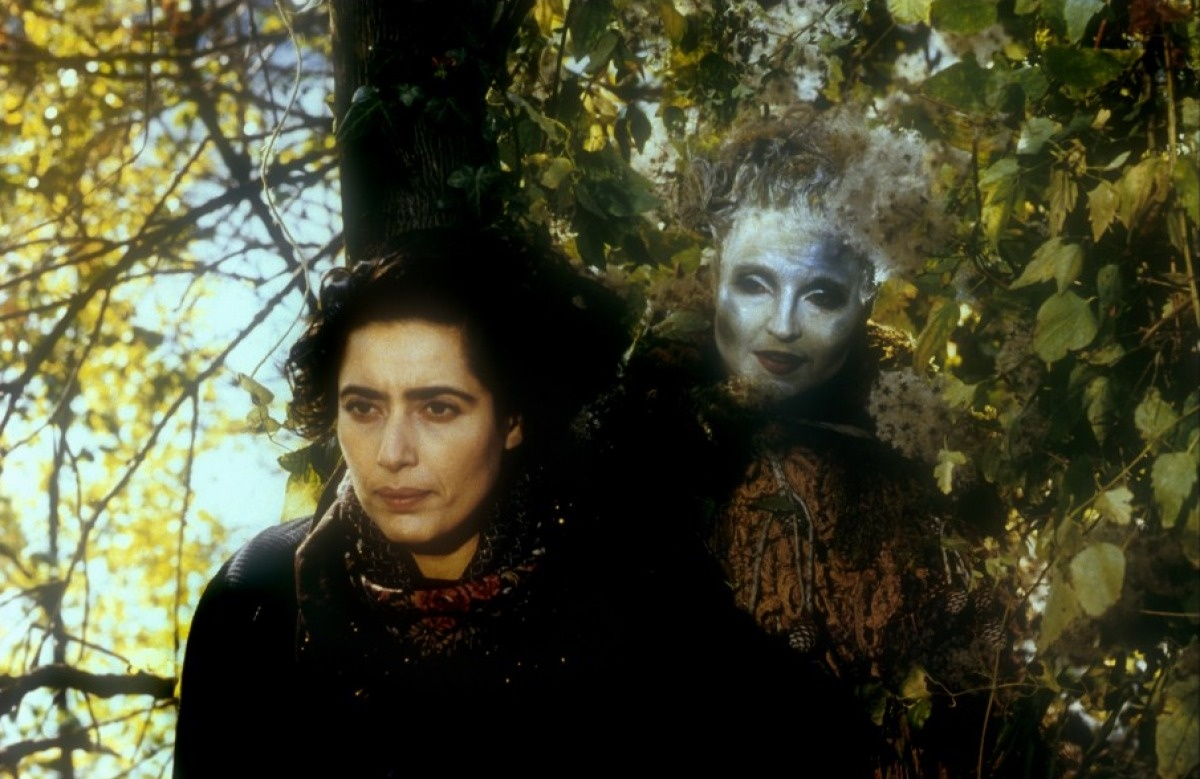
Ophrah Shemesh and Hanna Schygulla in Golem, the Spirit of the Exile, 1991

"(...) We never go inside the reality of the war but always remain at the edge of the scene, on its tangent. The camera constantly glides over its subject without ever penetrating it, attacking it, like our eye on the surface of the screen, reproducing within the film our real situation as spectators. (...) Field Diary offers a civilian image of war, […] setting it apart from the rest of audio-visual production by its content as much as by its mode of operation, by the solution it offers to a problem that pertains to the ethics of the filmmaker as much as to the aesthetics of cinema"

— Yann Lardeau, Cahiers du cinéma, n° 344, February 1983

He continued with the making of the trilogy on the procedures of world capitalism (Pineapple, 1984; Bangkok-Bahrain/Labour for Sale, 1984; Orange, 1998) and the trilogy on the resurgence of the European extreme right (In the Wupper Valley, 1993; In the Name of the Duce/Naples-Rome, 1994; Queen Mary '87, 1995). In addition he made trilogies of fiction, trilogies of exile (Esther, 1985; Berlin-Jerusalem, 1989; Golem, the spirit of exile, 1991), trilogies of cities (Devarim, 1995; Yom Yom, 1998; Kadosh, 1999), trilogy of historical events decisive for Israel (Yom Kippur, 2000; Eden, 2001; Kedma, 2002 and trilogy of borders (Promised Land, 2004; Free Zone, 2005; Disengagement, 2007).

He then devoted a diptych to his parents, with the first film Carmel (2009), an intimate reflection on the correspondence of his mother Efratia (Gallimard, 2010). The second film Lullaby to My Father (2012) traces the journey of his father Munio Gitai Weinraub from his childhood in Silesia, his Bauhaus studies with Mies van der Rohe and Hannes Meyer at the time of the rise to power and the conquest of power by the Nazis.

"It's like a jigsaw puzzle, and even more like a kaleidoscope, voices mingle, and faces, Jeanne Moreau, Hanna Schygulla, damaged photos, memories, vestiges, the quest is all personal, it's precisely in this way that it becomes universal, associating relationship to one's land and its history (the Gitai family's journey is inseparable from the founding of the State of Israel), rootedness and vagrancy, attraction and repulsion."

— Pascal Mérigeau, CinéObs, 17 January 2013

Gitai conducts tireless research on aesthetic means, which is anchored in the experimental uses of the camera from adolescence, and goes through the assertive stylisation of early fiction under the claimed influence of Bertolt Brecht and expressionism, as well as through the search for filming devices adapted to particular projects. One of the stylistic figures most willingly employed by Amos Gitai is the sequence shot, the long duration of the recording being used for multiple purposes never limited to visual seduction, but always in search of meaningful effects. A committed artist, Gitai is also the inventor of unexpected dramatic structures, such as the asymmetrical doubling of Berlin-Jerusalem, the spatial blocks of Alila or the temporal blocks of One day you'll understand (2008), the destabilizing fluidity of the Promised Land, the critical superimpositions of The Arena of Murder and Free Zone, to the abruptly broken-in-two narrative of Disengagement (2007) or the single 81-minute sequence shot of Ana Arabia (2013), which depicts a moment in the life of a small community of Jewish and Arab outsiders on the outskirts of Jaffa.

"Shot on 6 March, between 4 and 5:30 pm, Ana Arabia, Amos Gitai's 21st feature-length fiction film, is much more concise than the other films. ...] The first day of shooting was set for Sunday, March 3. But what was shot on that day was not at all the film that Gitaï finally showed in Venice. Between Sunday evening and Wednesday, the main character disappeared: the actress who played the character left the set and the script was profoundly reworked. It is the culmination of a succession of metamorphoses that shaped the film, an illustration of the Gitai method. [...] Discovering the finished film, made from the remains of the one that almost happened on a Sunday and the efforts of a whole team over the next three days, a phrase from the director came back. He spoke of the situation in the Middle East: "We have no choice, we must remain optimistic despite what we know. We must inject hope into reality." A good summary of the shooting plan for this unique shot."

— Thomas Sotinel, Le Monde, 19 September 2013

35 years after Field Diary (1982), Gitai returned to the West Bank with West of the Jordan River (2017), which describes the relationship between Israelis and Palestinians today. A tribute to those, "civilian or military, known or anonymous, who, in Israel, have not renounced reconciliation with the Palestinians", the film is presented in the Directors' Fortnight13 at the Cannes Film Festival.

2018 was an active year for Amos Gitai, when he was invited by the Venice Mostra to present two films in the competition of the Venice Film Festival. A Tramway in Jerusalem (2019) is a themed comedy that humorously observes moments of daily life on the Jerusalem tramway. The film stars 36 Israeli actors Yaël Abecassis, Hanna Laszlo, singer Noa Achinoam Nini, Palestinians and Europeans Mathieu Amalric and Pippo Delbono. On this tramway line that connects several neighborhoods in Jerusalem, from east to west, recording their variety and differences, this comedy humorously looks at moments in the daily lives of a few passengers.

The film is preceded by Amos Gitai's A Letter to a Friend in Gaza (2018, 34 mins, in Hebrew & Arabic), which responds to the current crisis between Israel and Gaza. Tao Palestinians and two Israelis read texts inspired by Mahmoud Darwish, Yizhar Smilansky, Emile Habibi and Amira Hass, as an homage to a famous letter written by Albert Camus in 1943, which gives its title to the film.

=== Gitai works on Rabin ===
Gitai in 2015

In 2015, his film The Last Day of Yitzhak Rabin was presented in competition at the Venice Mostra and then at the Toronto International Film Festival. Twenty years after the assassination of the Israeli Prime Minister by a religious right-wing student on November 4, 1995, in Tel Aviv, Gitai looks back on this traumatic event. Placing the assassination in its political and social context, Yitzhak Rabin's Last Day mixes fictional reconstructions and archival footage in this political thriller that is also about the growing crisis in contemporary Israeli society.

"My dear country, which I love very much, is not doing very well. It lacks, in particular, a political figure who would have the courage, I would even say the optimism, despite everything that is happening in the Middle East, to move forward, to reach out, to create a dialogue in this impossible world. This absence of a visionary figure is dramatic. In this context, what can I do? I am not a politician. I trained as an architect and I am a filmmaker. Then I remembered what Jeanne Moreau once said to me: "Every new project is an opportunity for me to learn certain things I don't know yet. "So I decided to make this film. It was an opportunity to ask Israeli society a question"

— Amos Gitai, Le Monde, 9 September 2015

Continuing his reflection on how art can reflect a historical event, Amos Gitai has also created in 2016 an exhibition/installation, Yitzhak Rabin: Chronicle of an Assassination. It was presented first at the Maxxi Museum, Rome, under the title 'Chronicle of an Assassination Foretold', then at the BOZAR Museum in Brussels and at the Collection Lambert in Avignon (spring/summer 2016). Ceramics, photographs, video installations and archival documents take up space to offer a new reading of the events leading up to Yitzhak Rabin's assassination.

This exhibition echoes a theatrical performance given in the Cour d'Honneur of the Palais des Papes on 10 July 2016 for the Avignon Festival. Based on the memories of Leah Rabin, Yitzhak Rabin's wife, Amos Gitai imagines an "able with four female protagonists, two actresses, Hiam Abbass and Sarah Adler, and two musicians, Edna Stern (piano) and Sonia Wieder-Atherton (cello), four voices associated in a recitative mode, between lament and lullaby, which go back in time. The show was performed in the same year in English at the Lincoln Center in New York and at the Ford Theater in Los Angeles, then at the Philharmonie de Paris in 2018 with soprano Barbara Hendricks, at the Théâtre du Châtelet, in a production by the Théâtre de la Ville (Paris), in 2021, at the Coronet Theater in London (also in 2021), and more recently in German at the Burgtheater in Vienna (Austria) in 2024. The show is never exactly the same from one performance to the next, since Gitai conceives each new presentation of the show as a re-creation, combining music, text, voices, and videos.

Finally, Gitai’s donation of his archives on his work on Rabin's assassination to the Bibliothèque nationale de France in 2018 led to an exhibition first presented at the Bibliothèque nationale de France, followed by a donation from the BnF to the Museo Reina Sofia in Madrid in 2021.

"If we consider the ‘Rabin work’ as a whole, these multiple intersections between reflections on history, essays on current political events, personal diaries, the effervescence of genres, the use of archives, and forays into theater and museography make it a core element of Amos Gitai's work, it's very emblem.”

— Antoine de Baecque, Gitai Rabin, Chroniques d’un assassinat, Gallimard/BNF, 2021

=== Novel adaptations ===
Gitai adapted several novels. Devarim is an adaptation of Yaakov Shabtai's Past Continuous. One day you'll understand ("Plus tard tu comprendras", 2008) is based on an autobiographical book by Jérôme Clément, president of the Arte television channel and one of the leading figures of French culture, and tells the story of a French writer tracing the story of his Jewish mother (Jeanne Moreau) and her family during World War II. Roses à crédit (2010) is an adaptation of the novel by Elsa Triolet and takes a look at the materialist, post-war world of the French lower middle-class. The film was shot entirely in France.

In 2014 he directed the film Tsili, inspired by the novel by Aharon Appelfeld, which describes the wandering of its heroine submerged in the nightmare of the Second World War. Tsili, a young Jewish woman, gathers all the forces of intuition and vitality to survive in this desperate universe. starring Sarah Adler, Meshi Olinski, and Lea Koenig. adapted from a novel by Aharon Appelfeld, he returns to the Second World War and the Holocaust:

"Aharon Appelfeld is an author that I respect infinitely, first of all because he doesn't instrumentalize the Shoah. He doesn't use things outside of his experience, there is a minimalism in his writing that I find essential, profoundly accurate and moving. Adapting this text for me allowed me to create some distance, not to be illustrative. I wanted to make a film of tenderness in the middle of this hell. That's the contrast that interested me. Appelfeld weaves his stories with tiny details. It's a fiction but it's partly based on his autobiographical experience : his character, Tsili, reacts to threatening sounds or birdsong, she smells, she contemplates the landscape... It is all this juxtaposition of delicate details that makes us feel the claustrophobic environment in which she lives. The forest in which she has taken refuge protects her from cruelty and imprisons her at the same time. With Tsili, I close a cycle of four very intimate films: Carmel, based on my mother's correspondence; Lullaby to my father, dedicated to my father, a Bauhaus architect driven out of Europe by the Nazis; Ana Arabia, which evokes a community of Jews and Arabs in Jaffa. After Kadosh and Yom Kippur, I needed to move towards a more radical film language, to avoid the conventions of cinema."

— Amos Gitaï (remarks collected by Alexandra Schwarzbrod), Libération, 12 August 2015

=== Recent films ===
More recently, Gitai directed the "Confinement Trilogy", with Un tramway à Jérusalem (2019), Laila in Haifa (2020) and Shikun(2024)[5]. Inspired by Eugène Ionesco's play Rhinoceros, Shikun tells the story of the emergence of intolerance and totalitarian thinking through a series of episodes set in Israel in a single building, the Shikun. In this hybrid group of people of different origins and languages, some turn into rhinoceroses, but others resist. An ironic metaphor for life in our contemporary societies, starring Irène Jacob and Bahira Ablassi. The film was presented in the official selection at the Berlin Film Festival| Berlinale | in 2024. In the same year, Amos Gitai presented his film Why War at the Venice Film Festival (Biennale Cinema 2024 | Homepage 2024, also in the official selection. Inspired by the correspondence between Albert Einstein and Sigmund Freud in 1932 on how to avoid war, as well as texts by Susan Sontag and Virginia Woolf, this essay film attempts to trace the roots of human conflict in order to explain the savagery of the wars that devastate our world. It stars Mathieu Amalric (Freud), Micha Lescot (Einstein), Irène Jacob, and Jérôme Kircher. The film denounces war without showing it because "on both the Israeli and Palestinian sides, the pain of others is denied," the filmmaker said in an interview with Le Monde.

=== Exhibitions and publications ===
Cinema installations, exhibitions and book publications are integral to Gitai's work. He has exhibited and published in leading institutions in Israel and around the world such as the Israel Museum in Jerusalem, the Tel Aviv Museum, the Pompidou Center in Paris, MoMa in New York, the Reina Sofia Museum in Madrid and more. Many of his exhibitions were dedicated to his parents Munio and Efratia, such as the 1996 retrospective initiated at the Pompidou Center, which deals with the work of his father (the only retrospective devoted to an Israeli architect in the Paris Museum) or the publication of his mother's letters – Efratia Gitai's letters in 1994.

In 2011, he presented the exhibition Traces at the Palais de Tokyo in Paris, the Bauhaus Museum in Dessau, Germany and the Art Museum at Kibbutz Ein Harod in Israel. In Traces, Gitai created an audio-visual stroll with great intimacy through images taken from fourteen of his films. Images and sounds, side by side, of destroyed walls in World War II, of stolen property of the Jews living there, of a crowd chanting "Mussolini" during Mussolini's granddaughter's election campaign in a video taken in Auschwitz. The work ranges from the violent reality of the Middle East to the soft waltz of a veteran couple on the evening of their arrest. The journey shown in the work evokes the violence of its history and echoes, and creates a personal reflection on the xenophobia that can change fates.

In the same year, Gitai inaugurated the Museum of Architecture Munio Gitai Weinraub in his father's old offices in Haifa.

After directing his film Rabin, The Last Day in 2015, Gitai continued investigating Rabin's murder in presenting the exhibition Yitzhak Rabin : Chronicle of an Assassination, presented at the MAXXI Museum in Rome, Italy, at the BOZAR Museum in Brussels, Belgium and at the Fondation Lambert in Avignon, France. Through working with ceramics, photographs and video installations, Gitai aimed at a new reading of the events leading up to the murder.

He also presented the exhibition Before and After, featuring two experimental films he filmed on his Super 8 camera during the 1973 Yom Kippur War. The film Before and After and Black and White were exhibited along with still photographs. In Before and after, Gitai returned to his traumatic injury during a helicopter crash from which he managed to escape. The Super 8 camera shows the military jacket he wore at the time of the accident. It becomes the film's central figure. Along with the series of photographs presented, Gitai continued his post-mortem decoding work of the moment the experience became a personal memory. this is a process in which the subject disappears; What appears in its place is extreme compression of thick, grainy material, which translates to the stigma of the time and makes a picturesque feeling appear. What artistic situations can give a proper description of that event, to that trauma? What traces remain in memory – a few weeks after, or forty years after? The artist's journey is mutually and simultaneously fed by both film and still photography.

In July 2016, a 540-page book on Amos Gitai was published by Galerie Enrico Navarra and Sébastien Moreu. The book includes more than 250 reproductions from movies and research, but also family archives and creations by Amos Gitai and 7 conversations between Gitai and : Hans-Ulrich Obrist, Guy Amsellem, Arthur Miller, Hou Hanru, Annette Michelson, Richard Ingersoll, Elisabeth Lebovici & Stephan Levine), two poems (Mount Carmel and Lullaby to My Father) and a poetic essay on the Golem.

In 2008–2009, the Pinakothek der Moderne in Munich dedicated a major exhibition to Amos Gitai and his father Munio Weinraub Gitai entitled Architektur und Cinema in Israel, which was presented the following year at the Tel Aviv Museum of Modern Art.

In 2014, the Reina Sofia Museum (Madrid) dedicated a major exhibition to him, Amos Gitai biografías. In the same year, the Cinémathèque française presented his film archives in an exhibition entitled Amos Gitai, architecte de la mémoire.

In 2022 (February–April), at the invitation of the City of Florence, Amos Gitai will take over the Sala d'Arme of the Palazzo Vecchio with an installation entitled Promised Lands. Using fragments from his theatrical and cinematographic work, he will evoke migrants and their destinies, history and the present, in various languages spoken around the Mediterranean.

To mark the 50th anniversary of the Yom Kippur War, Amos Gitai presents a multimedia exhibition entitled Kippur, War Requiem at the Tel Aviv Museum of Art (September 2023 – February 2024) and then at the Taddaeus Ropac Gallery (Salzburg, Austria).

=== Theatrical performances ===
IGitai's body of work includes theater. Like his cinematic interest, also in his theatrical pieces, Gitai focuses on the tension between the personal and the historical, between the local and the universal. Many of his works have been presented at leading institutions around the world, such as the Avignon Festival in France, the Paris Philharmonic and the Lincoln Center in New York. Among his works, Metamorphosis of a Melody that opened the Venice Biennale in 1993 and The War of the Sons of Light Against the Sons of Darkness with Jeanne Moreau that was presented in Festival d'Avignon in 2009 and in Odeon Theater in Paris in 2010.

At the same year he created the piece Efratia Gitai: Letters, which premiered at the Odeon Theater in Paris in 2010. Similar to The War of the Sons of Light Against the Sons of Darkness, Gitai worked with Jeanne Moreau who was reading his mother's letters.

"Efratia Munschik-Margalit was born in Haifa in 1909 and died in 2003 at the age of 93. Her correspondence reveals, from the first letters of 1928, in which she addressed her father and sisters, her independent spirit, her curiosity to the world and to political life, until the letters of the 1990s, shortly before her death. An intellectual and a traveler, Ephratia captivates us with her taste for life and the energy she brings with her to the different experiences in it. (...) Her political and historical vision, her pleasure in life, her love for landscapes, Mount Carmel where she lives with her husband Munio, but also that of London's cold streets, or a lake in Finland its ... these experiences as a woman, the wisdom and her strong desire to learn and understand the world passes to us through these letters."

— Blandine Masson, France Culture

Another piece is Yitzhak Rabin : Chronicle of an Assassination, created following the movie Rabin, The Last Day (2015) and premiered at the 2016 Avignon Festival. In this work, Gitai drew on the memories of Leah Rabin, the prime minister's wife, and produced a parable liberated from all formalism. Four female heroines, four voices reciting the text that becomes a text between lament and lullaby, recreate the unprecedented course of history and violence in which the nationalist forces opposed the peace project led by Yitzhak Rabin, by defection and incitement. Four voices taken, as if "in an echo chamber," between documentary imagery and extracts from classical literature – the same vivid memory that always accompanied the filmmaker and director in his understanding of Israeli state and society.

In 2019, the stage version of A Letter to a Friend in Gaza premiered at the Spoleto Festival in the United States. The piece was multimedia. At a time when art and entertainment are often synonymous, the play restored confidence in the theater's ability to ask difficult political and cultural questions. The audience cannot remain passive, and takes on the difficult task of understanding the theatrical experience in the face of his thoughts, perceptions and opinions regarding the Israeli-Palestinian conflict. Instead of proposing theory or solution, the play serves as a powerful trigger for much-needed political imagination. A Letter to a Friend in Gaza was originally a 34-minute film screened in 2018 at the Venice Festival. It was Nigel Redon, the director of the Spoleto Festival, who suggested Gitai to work on a stage version for the festival. His film and stage work share texts and actors, yet, paradoxically, the structure and feel of the film seem more theatrical, while the open horizon and stratified composition of the half-hour theatrical version give the impression of cinema.

In spring 2023, Amos Gitai created a theatrical adaptation of his documentary trilogy House at the Théâtre de la Colline in Paris. On stage, the story of the House becomes a metaphor and the site of an artistic dialogue between actors and musicians from all over the Middle East, with different languages, origins and musical traditions, united in an attempt to tell together the memory of the past and the possibility of reconciliation. "A mosaic of individual narratives, all dealing with the idea of home, lost or found". The cast includes Irène Jacob, Micha Lescot, Menashe Noy, Bahira Ablassi, Kioomars Musayyebi and Alexey Kochetkov, with musical contributions from choirmaster Richard Wilberforce, soprano Dima Bawab and lighting by Jean Kalman.

Invited by major European venues, the show was performed at the Berlin Festspiele then at the Barbican in London, at the Teatro Argentina as part of the Roma Europa Festival in Rome, and in 2025 at the Teatro Canal in Madrid.

After creating House in 2023, Amos Gitaï returns to the Théâtre national de La Colline in Paris in 2025 with a new show entitled Golem. This legendary figure from Kabbalistic texts—the Golem is a clay creature created to protect the Jewish community in response to persecution—was already the subject of a film trilogy in the early 1990s, with Birth of a Golem (1990), Golem: The Spirit of Exile (1991), The Petrified Garden (1993). With this new multimedia theater production in nine languages, Gitai draws inspiration from a children's story by Isaac Bashevis Singer, texts by Joseph Roth and Lamed Shapiro, and one of his own texts, "Take Some Dust", and the biographies of his actors, to superimpose this myth on contemporary questions about the relationship between creation and destruction, and create a parable about the fate of persecuted minorities. The show was performed in the ancient theater of Pompeii (Italy) in June 2025.

Archives

Amos Gitai's films are preserved in several film libraries around the world, including the Cinémathèque française, the Cinémathèque Suisse, and the Jerusalem Cinematheque. In addition, the filmmaker deposited the paper archives of several films at the Cinémathèque française in 2014.

In 2017, Stanford University (Stanford Libraries' Department of Special Collections) acquired the digital archives of eight films by Amos Gitai (the trilogy House, Later You Will Understand, Tsili, the border trilogy (Promised Land, Free Zone, Disengagement), comprising 19 hard drives with 10.5 terabytes of data.

In 2018, Amos Gitai donated to the Bibliothèque nationale de France all the documentary material collected or produced since 1994 on Yitzhak Rabin: research, rushes, photographs, scripts, editing stages, comprising 30,000 documents and 150,000 files relating to seven films, documentaries and fiction: Let's Give Peace a Chance (1994), The Arena of Murder (1996), The Last Day of Yitzhak Rabin (2015). These documents, which are mainly digital, are the subject of a pioneering research and development program on new film archives, in collaboration with Stanford University. Echoing the exhibition designed by Amos Gitai and presented at the BnF on this occasion (May–November 2021), Gallimard is publishing a book, Amos Gitai/Yitzhak Rabin, which offers reflections and analyses on the Rabin archives deposited at the BnF, as well as two long poems composed by Gitai.

"The decision to donate the collection to the Library was also dictated by the desire to preserve this highly symbolic collection in a country, France, where he experienced a warm welcome and support for creativity during his years of exile from Israel."

=== Teachings and conferences ===
Amos Gitai often teaches and attends conferences around the world. In 2017, he was a guest professor at University of California, Berkeley, where he studied in his youth. His lectures focused on his documentary and fictional work. Through the screening of several films, the audience was able to dive into Israel's political and social issues. As a skilled architect, Gitai has a unique way of understanding and representing a human experience through time and space, and through the films House, City and Border, Gitai managed to present a complex narrative and image of Israel in the context of a larger global discourse.

In 2018, after being elected as chair in Artistic Creation at the Collége de France in Paris, Gitai was invited to give a series of 9 lessons and lectures on his cinematic work through an ethical, political and artistic lens, called 'Crossing the Borders'. His lessons were: The documentary as metaphor; "I don't politicise my films, they have politicised me"; Depicting War; Space and Structure, Cinema and Architecture; Cinema and History; Is Cinema More Authoritarian Than Literature?; Collective Mythologies and Memories; Chronicle of an Assassination.

Amos Gitai was also a visiting professor in 2018 at Columbia University; in 2021 at the University of Tel Aviv; and in 2021-2022 at the Van Leer Institute, Jerusalem, for a series of lectures entitled: Transition, Crossing, Border.

Architecture

In 2014, the Cité de l'architecture et du patrimoine (Paris) organized eight meetings between Amos Gitai and various guests, based on his documentary series Architecture in Israel/Conversations with Amos Gitai (2012), consisting of 16 films of 23 minutes each. In this series, Gitai meets architects, sociologists, archaeologists, researchers, writers, and theologians, and converses with them about architectural and urban planning themes, drawing on the history and current events of Palestine and Israel—the Ottoman period, the British Mandate, Bedouin settlements, eclectic, brutalist, and modern architecture, and more. In each episode, archival materials—photos, plans, architectural drawings, etc.—illustrate these conversations. During meetings organized by the Cité de l'Architecture et du Patrimoine, guests compare their views on a discipline that remains, in many ways, an essential focus for the director.

In the 2010s, Amos Gitai created the Munio Weinraub Gitai Architecture Museum in Haifa, in collaboration with the Haifa Municipality and the Haifa Museum Society, in his father's former architect's studio. Each year, the museum hosts temporary exhibitions on Israeli and international architecture and organizes meetings with architects and artists interested in architecture and urban planning. The exhibitions, which are thematic or monographic, aim to provoke discussion and exchange about architecture and its place in society.

Awards

- 1989: Filmcritica "Bastone Bianco" Award - Special Mention at the Venice Film Festival 1989 for Berlin-Jerusalem
- 1998: Wolgin Award at the Jerusalem Film Festival for Yom Yom
- 1998: Best Israeli Screenplay at the Jerusalem International Film Festival for Yom Yom
- 1999: UNESCO Prize at the Venice Film Festival 1999 for Zion, Auto-Émancipation
- 2000: BAFTA for Best Foreign Film for Kadosh
- 2000: François-Chalais Prize at the Cannes Film Festival 2000 for Kippur
- 2002: UNESCO Prize at the Venice Film Festival 2002 for 11'09"01 - September 11
- 2004: CinemaAvvenire Award at the Venice Film Festival 2004 for Terre promise
- 2005: Roberto Rossellini Award at the Cannes Film Festival 2005
- 2008: Honorary Leopard at the 61st Locarno International Film Festival for his entire body of work
- 2013: Robert Bresson Prize at the Venice Film Festival 2013
- 2013: Green Drop Award at the Venice Film Festival 2013 for Ana Arabia
- 2013: SIGNIS Award - Honorable Mention at the Venice Film Festival 2013 for Ana Arabia
- 2014: Paradjanov Prize
- 2015: Mousse d'Or at the Venice Film Festival 2015 for The Last Day of Yitzhak Rabin
- 2015: Human Rights Film Network Award at the Venice Film Festival 2015 for The Last Day of Yitzhak Rabin
- 2018: UNIMED Award at the Venice Film Festival 2018 for A Tramway in Jerusalem
- 2018: Human Rights Film Network Award at the Venice Film Festival 2018 for Letter to a Friend in Gaza

Nominations and selections

- For Berlin-Jerusalem
  - 1989: Golden Lion at the 46th Venice Film Festival
- For Yom Yom
  - 1998: Ophir Award for Best Director and Ophir Award for Best Screenplay
- For Kadosh:
  - 1999: Palme d'Or at the 52nd Cannes Film Festival
  - 1999: Grand Prix at the 52nd Cannes Film Festival
  - 1999: Jury Prize at the 52nd Cannes Film Festival
  - 1999: Best Director Award at the 52nd Cannes Film Festival
  - 1999: Ophir for Best Director and Ophir for Best Screenplay (with Eliette Abecassis)
- For Kippur:
  - 2000: Palme d'Or at the 53rd Cannes Film Festival
  - 2000: Grand Prix at the 53rd Cannes Film Festival
  - 2000: Jury Prize at the 53rd Cannes Film Festival
  - 2000: Best Director Award at the 53rd Cannes Film Festival
  - 2000: Special Mention for the entire cast at the 53rd Cannes Film Festival
  - 2000: Ophir Award for Best Director
- For Eden:
  - 2001: Golden Lion at the 58th Venice Film Festival
- For Kedma:
  - 2002: Palme d'Or at the 55th Cannes Film Festival
  - 2002: Grand Prix at the 55th Cannes Film Festival
  - 2002: Jury Prize at the 55th Cannes Film Festival
  - 2002: Best Director Award at the 55th Cannes Film Festival
- For 11'09"01 - September 11:
  - 2003: César Award for Best European Film at the 28th César Awards
- For Alila:
  - 2003: Golden Lion at the 60th Venice Film Festival
- For The Promised Land:
  - 2004: Golden Lion at the 61st Venice Film Festival
- For Free Zone
  - 2005: Palme d'Or at the 58th Cannes Film Festival
  - 2005: Grand Prix at the 58th Cannes Film Festival
  - 2005: Jury Prize at the 58th Cannes Film Festival
  - 2005: Best Director Award at the 58th Cannes Film Festival
  - 2005: National Education Award at the 58th Cannes Film Festival
- For Ana Arabia:
  - 2013: Golden Lion at the 70th Venice Film Festival
  - 2013: Grand Jury Prize at the 70th Venice Film Festival
  - 2013: FIPRESCI Prize at the 70th Venice Film Festival
  - 2013: Special Jury Prize at the 70th Venice Film Festival
- For The Last Day of Yitzhak Rabin:
  - 2015: Golden Lion at the 72nd Venice Film Festival
  - 2015: Best Screenplay Award at the 72nd Venice Film Festival
  - 2015: Green Drop Award at the 72nd Venice Film Festival
- For West of the Jordan:
  - 2017: Golden Eye at the 70th Cannes Film Festival
- For Laila in Haifa:
  - 2020: Golden Lion at the 77th Venice Film Festival
  - 2020: Queer Lion at the 77th Venice Film Festival
- For Shikun:
  - 2024: 74th Berlin International Film Festival
- For Why War:
  - 2024: 82nd Venice Film Festival

Honors

- Doctor honoris causa from the University of Versailles – Saint-Quentin-en-Yvelines (2011)
- Commander of the Order of Arts and Letters
- Knight of the Legion of Honor (2017)
- Grand Officer of the Order of the Star of Italy (2019)

== Favourite films ==
In 2022, Gitai participated in the Sight & Sound film polls of that year. It is held every ten years to select the greatest films of all time, by asking contemporary directors to select ten films of their choice.

Gitai selections were:

- Germania anno zero (1948)
- Touch of Evil (1958)
- Stalker (1979)
- Ivan the Terrible (1944)
- La Caduta degli Dei (1969)
- The Naked Kiss (1964)
- Le Mépris (1963)
- Berlin Alexanderplatz (1931)
- Some Came Running (1958)
- L'Argent (1983)

== Filmography ==
=== Fiction ===
- Laila in Haifa (2020)
- A Tramway in Jerusalem (2018)
- Rabin, the Last Day (2015)
- Tsili (2014)
- Ana Arabia (2013)
- Lullaby to My Father (2011)
- Roses à crédit (2010)
- La Guerre des fils de lumière contre les fils des ténèbres (2010)
- Carmel (2009)
- One Day You Will Understand (Plus tard tu compremderas (2008)
- Disengagement (2007)
- Free Zone (2005)
- Promised Land (2004)
- Alila (2003)
- Kedma (2002)
- Eden (2001)
- Kippur (2000)
- Kadosh (1999)
- Yom Yom (1998)
- Devarim (1995)
- Golem The Petrified Garden (1993)
- Golem, the Spirit of Exile (1991)
- Birth of a Golem (1990)
- Berlin-Jerusalem (1989)
- Esther (1985)

=== Documentaries ===
- The Road to Jericho (2026)
- Golem in Pompei (2025)
- Why War (2024)
- Shikun (2024)
- Letter to A Friend in Gaza (2019)
- West of the Jordan River (2017)
- Reflections on Architecture (2016)
- Architecture in Israel: Conversations with Amos Gitai (2013)
- The War of the Sons of Light Against the Sons of Darkness (2009)
- New from Home / News from House (2005)
- Wadi Grand Canyon 2001 (2001)
- Zion, Auto-Emancipation (1998)
- A House in Jerusalem (1998)
- Orange (Tapuz) (1998)
- Kippur, War Memories (1997)
- War and Peace in Vesoul (1997)
- The Arena of murder (1996)
- Munio Weinraub Gitai Architect (1909–1970) (1996)
- Milim (1996)
- Metamorphosis of a Melody (1996)
- Queen Mary '87 (1994)
- Give Peace a Chance (1994)
  - Part 1: In the Land of Oranges
  - Part 2: Political Route
  - Part 3: Writers Speak
  - Part 4: Theater For Life
- In the Name of the Duce (1994)
- In the Valley of the Wupper (1993)
- Wadi, Ten Years After (1991)
- Brand New Day (1987)
- Reagan: Image for Sale (1984)
- Bangkok-Bahrein/Labour for sale (1984)
- Pineapple (Ananas) (1983)
- Field Diary (Yoman sade) (1982)
- Wadi (1981)
- American Mythologies (1981)
- In Search of Identity (1980)
- House (Bayit) (1980)
- Wadi Salib Riots (1979)

=== Short films ===
- Words With Gods (2014)
- The Book of Amos (2012)
- The Dybbuk of Haifa (2007)
- 11 September – 11'09'01' (2002)
- Surgeon General's Warning (2001)
- Reagan: Image for Sale (1984)
- American Mythologies (1981)
- In Search of Identity (1980)
- Cultural Celebrities (1979)
- Jimmy Carter's visit in Israel (1979)
- Wadi Rushmia (1978)
- Architectura (1978)
- Under the Water (1977)
- Singing in Afula (1977)
- Public House (1977)
- Political Myths (1977)
- Hagvul (The Border) (1977)
- Dimitri (1977)
- Charisma (1975)
- My Mother at the Seashore (1975)
- Lucy (1974)
- Blowing Glass (1974)
- The International Orthodontist Congress (1974)
- Pictures in the Exhibition (1974)
- Memphis U.S.A (part 2) (1974)
- Memphis U.S.A. (Faces) (1974)
- Water (1974)
- Ahare (Images After War) (1974)
- Images of War 1, 2, 3 (1974)
- Arlington U.S.A (1974)
- Shosh (1973)
- Talking About Ecology (1973)
- Fire Eats Paper, Paper Eats Fire (1973)
- Memories of a comrade of the 2nd Aliya (1972)
- Windows in David Pinsky no.5 (1972)
- Souk Women's dialogues (1972)
- Waves (Galim) (1972)
- Geography according to Modern man and His Control on the Environnement (1972)
- Textures (1972)
- Black Is White (1972)
- Details of Architecture (1972)
- Arts and Crafts and Technology (1972)

== Exhibitions/Installations ==
- Kippur, War Requiem, Tel Aviv Museum of Art, Israel, 2023
- Promised Lands, Palazzo Vecchio, Sala d'Arme, Florence, Italy, 2022
- Champs de mémoire, Théâtre de la Ville, Paris, France, 2019
- The Law of the Pursuer, SAVVY Contemporary, Berlin, Allemagne, 2017
- Yitzhak Rabin: Chronicle of an Assassination, MAXXI, Rome, Italie, 2016; Bozar-Centre for Fine Arts, Bruxelles, Belgique, 2016; Collection Lambert, Avignon, France, 2016; Galerie 75 Faubourg, Paris, France, 2017
- Amos Gitai Before and After, Galerie Thaddaeus Ropac, Salzbourg, Villa Kast, Autriche, 2015
- Amos Gitai Architecte de la mémoire, Cinémathèque Française, Paris, France, 2014; Musée de l'Élysée, Lausanne, Suisse, 2015; Cinéma Galeries, Bruxelles, Belgique, 2015
- Amos Gitai Strade | Ways Talking to Gabriele – Carpet – Lullaby to my Father, Palazzo Reale, Salle des Cariatides, Milan, Italie, 2014–15
- Amos Gitai Army Days Horizontal. Army Days Vertical, Galerie Thaddeus Ropac, Espace de Pantin, France, 2014
- Las biografías de Amos Gitai, Museo Nacional Centro de Arte Reina Sofía, Madrid, Spain, 2014
- Before and After, Galerie Thaddeus Ropac, Espace de Pantin, France, 2014; Villa Kast, Salzbourg, Austria 2015
- Disaster – The End of Days, Galerie Thaddeus Ropac, Espace de Pantin, France, 2014
- Amos Gitai Architecture de la mémoire, Église des Frères-Prêcheurs, Rencontres photographiques de Arles, France, 2012
- Amos Gitai Architetture della memoria, Mole Antonelliana, Museo Nazionale del Cinema, Turin, Italie, 2011– 2012
- Traces. Lullaby to My Father, Museum of Art, Ein Harod, Israel, 2011; Meisterhaus Vassily Kandinsky/Paul Klee – Dining room, Bauhaus, Dessau, Germany, 2011
- Traces. Efratia's Correspondence, Museum of Art, Ein Harod, Israel, 2011
- Traces – Munio Gitai Weinraub, Museum of Art, Ein Harod, Israel, 2011
- Amos Gitai Traces, Palais de Tokyo, Paris, France, 2011
- Lullaby for my father, a video presentation in Kibbutz Kfar Masaryk, Israel, 2010
- Amos Gitai Citations, Biennale Evento, Base sous-marine, Bordeaux, France, 2009
- Munio Weinraub, Amos Gitai Architektur und Film in Israel, Pinakothek der Moderne-Architektur Museum, Munich, Germany, 2009; Tel Aviv Museum of Art, Israel, 2009
- Amos Gitai: Non-Fiction, MoMA, New York, 2008
- Amos Gitai News From House News From Home, Kunst-Werke, Berlin, Germany, 2006; Centre chorégraphique national, Montpellier, France, 2006
- In memory of Munio Gitai Weinraub, Centre Pompidou, Paris, France, 2006
- Amos Gitai Parcours, Centre Pompidou, Paris, France, 2003
- Public Housing, Museum of Art, Ein Harod, Israel; Herzliya Museum of Contemporary Art, Herzliya, Israel; Saitama Museum of Modern Art, Saitama, Japan, 2000; Jerusalem Museum, Israel, 1994
- Opening Chen Zhen, Helena Rubinstein Pavillon, Tel Aviv, Israel, 1998
- Recycling Exhibition, Israel Museum, Jerusalem, Israel, 1975

== Performances ==
- Golem, La Colline Théâtre National, 2025, Teatrum Mundi, Pompeii, 2025
- House, La Colline Théâtre National, adaptation of documentary trilogy House (House, 1980; A house in Jerusalem, 1998; News from Home / News from House, 2005); Berlin Festspiele, 2024; Teatro Del Canal, Madrid, 2025
- Yitzhak Rabin: Chronik eines Mordes (Chronicle of an Assassination), Burgtheater, Vienna, Austria, 2024; Theatre de la Ville, Paris, France, 2021; Coronet Theater of London, UK, 2021; Philharmonie de Paris, France, 2018; John Anson Ford Theater, Los Angeles, USA, 2017; Lincoln Center Festival, New York, USA, 2017; Festival d'Avignon, France, 2016
- Interior Exiles, Theatre de la Ville, Paris, France, 2020
- Otello, Teatro di San Carlo, Naples, Italy, 2016
- A Reading of Efratia Gitai Correspondence, Odéon-Théâtre de l'Europe, Paris, France, 2010;Coronet Theater of London, UK, 2019; MoMa, New York, USA, 2020
- Letter to a Friend in Gaza, Coronet Theater of London, UK, 2019; Theatre de la Ville, Paris, France, 2019; Emmet Robinson Theater, Spoleto Festival, Charleston, USA, 2019
- The War of the Sons of Light Against the Sons of Darkness, Odéon-Théâtre de l'Europe, Paris, France 2010; Festival d'Avignon, France, 2009; Fortress Rumeli Hisari, Istanbul, Turkey, 2009; Venice Biennale, Italy, 1993
- Metamorphosis of a Melody, Venice Biennale, 1993; Gibellina, Sicily, Italy, 1992

== Teachings ==
Collège de France, Chair of Artistic Creation 2018–2019: Crossing borders, nine lectures followed by a colloquium: The creative process: contradictions, ethics, (re)interpretations.

- Inaugural lesson: The camera is a kind of fetish – Filming in the Middle East.
- Documentary as metaphor. House and Wadi, two documentary trilogies filmed over a quarter-century; Pineapple
- "I don't politicize my films, they politicize me".
- Representing war
- Space and structure, cinema and architecture
- Cinema and history
- Is cinema more authoritative than literature?
- Mythologies and collective memories
- Chronicle of an assassination

== Books ==
  - Amos Gitai, Kippur, War Requiem, Tel Aviv Museum of Art, 2023
  - Jean-Michel Frodon (Ed), Amos Gitai et l’enjeu des archives, Editions du Collège de France, 2021, https://www.college-de-france.fr/fr/editions/hors-collection/amos-gitai-et-enjeu-des-archives-9782722605794
  - Amos Gitai / Yitzhak Rabin Chroniques d'un assassinat, Antoine de Baecque, Patrick Boucheron, Ouzi Elyada, Amos Gitai, Marie-José Sanselme, Éditions Gallimard / Bibliothèque nationale de France, Paris, 2021
  - Amos Gitai, Galerie Enrico Navarra, éditions Sébastien Moreu, Paris, 2016
  - Serge Toubiana (dir.), Frédéric Maire (dir.) et Matthieu Orléan (dir.), Amos Gitaï, architecte de la mémoire, Paris, Cinémathèque française / Éditions Gallimard, 2014 (ISBN 978-2-07-014411-2
  - Efratia Gitai Correspondence, Rivka Markovizky (Ed.), CPL Editions (Memoirs & Biographies) Centro Primo Levi, New York, 2018 – ISBN 1-941046-25-8; (In Hebrew) Yediot Aharonot, Tel-Aviv, 2011; (In French), Éditions Gallimard, Paris, 2010
  - Genèses, Jean-Michel Frodon, Amos Gitai, Marie-José Sanselme, Éditions Gallimard, Paris, 2009
  - Munio Weinraub / Amos Gitai – Architektur und Film in Israel, Architektur Museum – Pinakothek der Moderne, Munich, 2008
  - Amos Gitai: Exile and Atonement, Ray Privett, Cinema Purgatorio, 2008.
  - News from Home, Amos Gitai, Walther König, Köln, 2006
  - Cinema di Amos Gitai: Frontiere e territori (Il), Serge Toubiana, Bruno Mondadori, Torino, 2006
  - Serge Toubiana & Baptiste Piégay, The Cinema of Amos Gitai, Lincoln Center / Cahiers du cinéma, 2005 (ISBN 2-86642-225-2); (in French) Exils et territoires, le cinéma d’Amos Gitai, Cahiers du cinéma, 2003; (in Spanish) Exilios y territories, el cine de Amos Gitai, Serge Toubiana, Baptiste Piégay, Semana Internacional de Cine, Valladolid, 2004
  - Mont Carmel, Amos Gitai, Éditions Gallimard, 2003; Monte Carmelo, Amos Gitai, Bompiani, Milano, 2004
  - Serge Toubiana, Amos Gitai, Mostra internacional de cinema / Cosac Naify, São Paulo, 2004
  - Parcours, Amos Gitai, Centre Pompidou, Paris, 2003
  - Kippour (scénario), Amos Gitai, Marie-José Sanselme, Arte Editions / 00h00.com, Paris, 2003
  - Amos Gitai, Cinema, Politics, Aesthetics, Irma Klein, KM, Tel Aviv, 2003
  - Amos Gitai, Cinema forza di pace, Edited by Daniela Turco, Le Mani, Genova, 2002
  - Munio Gitai Weinraub, Bauhaus architect in Israel, Richard Ingersoll, Electa, Milano, 1994
  - (en) Paul Willemen, The Films of Amos Gitai, a Montage, BFI Publishing, 1993 (ISBN 978-0851704166)
  - The War of the Sons of Light Against the Sons of Darkness, Amos Gitai, Mazzotta, Milano, Genèses, Jean-Michel Frodon, Amos Gitai, Marie-José Sanselme, Éditions Gallimard, Paris, 2009.
  - Amos Gitai, Edited by Alberto Farassino, Mostra Internazionale Riminicinema, Rimini, 1989
