= In Search of the Second Amendment =

- DVD cover
- Directed by: David T. Hardy
- Written by: David T. Hardy
- Produced by: David T. Hardy
- Starring: David T. Hardy; Various professors and scholars
- Narrated by: David T. Hardy
- Cinematography: David T. Hardy
- Edited by: David T. Hardy
- Music by: Jason "Prophecy" Miller of Prophetik Music
- Distributed by: Second Amendment; Films LLC (DVD)
- Release date: December 19, 2006
- Running time: 111 minutes
- Country: United States
- Language: English
- Budget: US$45,000

In Search of the Second Amendment is a documentary film on the Second Amendment of the United States Constitution. It was produced and directed by American author and attorney David T. Hardy. He argues the individual rights model of the Second Amendment. Hardy also discusses the Fourteenth Amendment.

== Outline of the documentary ==
How Did You Become Interested in the Second Amendment?

- Legal Scholarship and the Second Amendment

England and the Militia

- Duty to be Armed

1688
A Medieval Duty Becomes an "Antient and Indubitable Right"

- King Charles I, Oliver Cromwell, and Richard Cromwell
- King Charles II, King James II, and Gun Control
- The Glorious Revolution, King William III, Queen Mary II, and the Bill of Rights 1689

1603–1768
Rights of Englishmen, Rights of Americans

- The Colonies and the Duty to be Armed
- The Right to Arms and William Blackstone

1768–1775
The Right Is Challenged as Revolution Approaches

- Britain takes notice and the Redcoats Come to Boston
- Conflict Breaks Out

1776–1780
The First State Constitutions Give Different Models for a Right to Arms

- Virginia Declaration of Rights
- Pennsylvania Declaration of Rights
- Massachusetts Declaration of Rights

1787–1789
A Proposal for a New Constitution Leads to Calls for a National Right to Arms

- The Constitutional Convention and the Bill of Rights
- State Ratification and Declaration of Rights Proposals
- Virginia and the Demand for a Bill of Rights
- The Compromise and James Madison
- Drafting of the Right to Arms
- The Militia and Standing Armies

1789
In the First Congress, James Madison Fulfils the Great Compromise

- Madison and the Bill of Rights
- How the Second Amendment was Drafted
- The Militia, the States, and the Federal Government
- The Senate and the Second Amendment
- Tench Coxe
- St. George Tucker
- William Rawle
- Thomas Cooley
- Contemporaries and the Second Amendment

So What's the Debate? Tracing the Origin of the Belief that the 2nd Amendment Relates to a State's Right to have a National Guard

- Meaning of "The People"
- Origin of the Collective Right
- Kansas Supreme Court
- The National Guard
- United States v. Miller (1939)
- United States v. Emerson (2001)

1868
The 14th Amendment Creates a New Guarantee of the Right to Arms: The Afro–American Experience

- Slave Codes
- Dred Scott v. Sandford (1856)
- Black Codes
- Views and Response of Congress
- Civil Rights Act of 1866 and Freedmen's Bureau Act of 1866
- The Federal Bill of Rights and the States
- The Fourteenth Amendment
- In Re Slaughter–House Cases (1873)
- United States v. Cruikshank (1875)
- D. W. Griffith's The Birth of a Nation

Civil Rights Movement

- Professor Olson's and Don Kate's Experiences as workers during the Civil Rights Movement
- Deacons for Defense
- Robert Williams and the NRA
- Lumbee Indian Tribe

American Enterprise Institute (AEI) Symposium on the Right to Arms

- Meaning of "The People" Revisited
- Dred Scott Revisited
- A New View of Standing Armies and Militias
- The Fourteenth Amendment Revisited
- Republican and Democratic Party Platforms on the Right to Arms
- Freedmen's Bureau Act of 1866 Revisited
- 18th and 19th Century Interpretation of the Second Amendment

Governments, Genocides, and Utility of the Right

- Armed Resistance and Genocide
- Protection from Different Sources of Oppression
- Frequency of Defensive Gun Uses and Crimes Committed
- Guns and Number of Lives Saved vs. Lives Taken
- Police and the Legal Duty to Protect the Public
- Warren v. District of Columbia (1981)
- View of Fellow Citizens
- Effectiveness of Defensive Gun Use
- Right of Self-defense and the Right to Arms
- Protecting the Second Amendment and Other Rights

Final Scene

- Closing Words
- Credits
- Dedications

== Persons appearing in the documentary ==
Professors of law

Professor	School
Akhil Amar	Yale Law School
Randy Barnett	Boston University School of Law
Robert Cottrol	George Washington University Law School
Brannon Denning	Cumberland School of Law
Nicholas Johnson	Fordham University School of Law
Sanford Levinson	University of Texas School of Law
Nelson Lund	George Mason University School of Law
Joyce Lee Malcolm	George Mason University School of Law
Joseph Olson	Hamline University School of Law
Daniel Polsby	George Mason University School of Law
Glenn Harlan Reynolds	University of Tennessee College of Law
Eugene Volokh	UCLA School of Law

Professors of criminology

Professor	School
Gary Kleck	Florida State University

Others

Name	Background
Carol Bambery	Attorney, NRA Director
Clayton Cramer	Historian, author
Sandy Froman	Attorney, NRA President
Stephen Halbrook	Attorney, Second Amendment author
David T. Hardy	Attorney, Second Amendment author
Roy Innis	National Chairman of CORE, NRA Director
Don Kates	Civil rights attorney, author
Dave Kopel	Attorney, Research Director of Independence Institute
Larry Pratt	Author, Executive Director of GOA
