= Yaari =

Yaari or Ya'ari (Hebrew: יערי) is a Hebrew-language surname. In Hebrew, "Yaari" (יַעֲרִי) means "belonging to the forest" or "of the forest," derived from the word "ya'ar" (יער) which means "forest". Notable people with the surname include:

- Aviezer Ya'ari (1930–2026), Israeli general
- David Yaari (born 1969), American-Israeli entrepreneur, philanthropist, community organizer and activist
- Ehud Yaari (born 1945), Israeli journalist
- Meir Ya'ari (1897–1987), Israeli politician
- Menahem Yaari (born 1935), Israeli economist
- Nurit Yaari – Israeli theatre scholar, dramaturg, director and consultant (1947-2025)
- Sharon Yaari (born 1966), Israeli photographer and educator
- Yedidya Ya'ari (born 1947), Israeli Navy
