= The Volokh Conspiracy =

American legal blog

- Website type: Legal blog
- Available in: English
- Creator: Eugene Volokh
- Parent: Reason magazine
- Website: reason.com/volokh
- Registration: None
- Launched: April 2002; 24 years ago

The Volokh Conspiracy (/ˈvɑːlək/ VOL-ik) is a legal blog co-founded in 2002 by law professor Eugene Volokh, covering legal and political issues from an ideological orientation it describes as "generally libertarian, conservative, centrist, or some mixture of these." It is one of the most widely read and cited legal blogs in the United States. The blog is written by legal scholars and provides discussion on complex court decisions.

In January 2014, The Volokh Conspiracy migrated to The Washington Post, with Volokh retaining full editorial control over its content. After June 2014, the blog was behind a paywall. In 2017, the blog moved to Reason. Volokh cited his principal reason for the move was to “be freely available to the broadest range of readers” and to have more editorial independence.

== Background ==
The Volokh Conspiracy was founded in April 2002 by Eugene Volokh, a First Amendment expert and Soviet Jewish refugee. After being offered a guest-blogging gig on Instapundit, Volokh decided to start his own blog in order to quickly disseminate his views in real time to a popular audience. Volokh, who graduated UCLA at the age of 15 with a degree in computer science and had been professor at UCLA law since the age of 24, built the site himself and invited his brother, Sasha, then a graduate student, to join him. The blog was initially called The Volokh Brothers and then changed to The Volokh Conspiracy, in reference to Hillary Clinton's claim of a "vast right-wing conspiracy." Volokh recruited other contributors through a "closely guarded selection process."

The blog is written by legal scholars and provides discussion on complex court decisions.

== Affordable Care Act ==
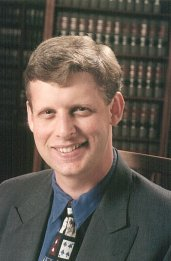
Eugene Volokh, founder of The Volokh Conspiracy

The Volokh Conspiracy, among other blogs, played an important role in influencing the view of Americans against the Patient Protection and Affordable Care Act (ACA). Many of The Volokh Conspiracy's postings were picked up by journalists and integrated into traditional media outlets. Subsequently, The Volokh Conspiracy impacted the questioning and opinions of judges and Supreme Court justices. Law professor Andrew Koppelman wrote that the blog was the "most important incubator" for constitutional challenges to the ACA.

According to legal scholar Dick Howard, The Volokh Conspiracy "provided a forum for conservative legal scholars to develop arguments against the individual mandate, helping to break down the perception of expert consensus on the constitutional issues in play." Additionally, authors of the blog were influential behind the National Federation of Independent Businesses v. Sebelius case where they were invited to submit an amicus brief which would be later referenced by Justice Antonin Scalia at oral argument. The blog was the originator of the "broccoli horrible" argument against the ACA.

Some contributors of the blog—including Randy Barnett, Jonathan Adler, David Bernstein, Orin Kerr, David Kopel, and Ilya Somin—wrote about their experiences challenging the ACA in a book titled A Conspiracy Against Obamacare: The Volokh Conspiracy and the Affordable Care Act (2014). The book details the precursor to the challenges and provides the text of the actual blogs that helped influence legal battles against the ACA. In the foreword of the book, former Solicitor General Paul Clement, the lead attorney who contested the ACA, compared The Volokh Conspiracy to the Federalist Papers and wrote: "[I]f ever a legal blog and a constitutional moment were meant for each other, it was the Volokh Conspiracy and the challenge to the Affordable Care Act."

== Reception ==
The Volokh Conspiracy has been described as one of the most widely read and cited legal blogs in the United States. It receives over 30,000 daily views as of 2007. The blog's readership consists of scholars and policymakers across the ideological spectrum. The Volokh Conspiracy blog appeared in ABA Journal's "Blawg 100 Hall of Fame".

Yale constitutional law professor Jack Balkin, founder of the liberal legal blog Balkinization, stated that The Volokh Conspiracy "discusses law and public policy at a very sophisticated level...It’s an example of how blogging transcends existing categories and expectations." Legal scholar Cass Sunstein wrote that the blog often provides "illuminating criticism" of the Supreme Court and found it filled with "civility, intelligence, and overall high quality," despite occasional group polarization. Lawyer Tom Goldstein, who co-founded SCOTUSblog, asserts that The Volokh Conspiracy "remains the single best place to go for interesting, thought-provoking, high-level thinking on the law."

Adam Liptak, Supreme Court correspondent for the New York Times, wrote that the Volokh Conspiracy "is the most influential law blog with a point of view." Andy Guess of Inside Higher Ed wrote that the blog "probably has more influence in the field – and more direct impact – than most law reviews."

Law professor and blogger Glenn Reynolds lists The Volokh Conspiracy as his favorite legal blog. Justice Elena Kagan is said to be a regular reader of the blog. Fact-checkers like PolitiFact and FactCheck.org have repeatedly cited The Volokh Conspiracy for legal analysis.

== Contributors ==
Over twenty law professors from across the country contribute to The Volokh Conspiracy. Notable contributors, past and present, include:

- Eugene Volokh, professor of law at UCLA School of Law, one of its founders
- Alexander "Sasha" Volokh, professor of law at Emory University School of Law, brother of Eugene Volokh
- Jonathan H. Adler, professor of law at the Case Western Reserve University School of Law, who contributed under the pseudonym "Juan Non-Volokh" until May 1, 2006
- Kenneth Anderson, professor of law at American University
- Stewart Baker, former Assistant Secretary of Homeland Security
- Randy Barnett, professor of law at Georgetown University Law Center
- William Baude, professor of law at University of Chicago Law School
- David Bernstein, professor of law at George Mason University School of Law
- Josh Blackman, professor of law at South Texas College of Law
- Dale Carpenter, professor of law at University of Minnesota Law School, and adjunct professor of law at William Mitchell College of Law
- Paul Cassell, professor of law at S.J. Quinney College of Law at the University of Utah
- Tyler Cowen, professor of economics at George Mason University, and James Buchanan Center and Mercatus Center scholar
- Clayton Cramer, historian
- Orin Kerr, professor of law at Stanford Law School, formerly at UC Berkeley School of Law
- Eugene Kontorovich, professor of law at Antonin Scalia Law School
- David Kopel, research director of the Independence Institute and adjunct professor, University of Denver Sturm College of Law
- Jim Lindgren, professor of law at Northwestern University School of Law and director of their Demography of Diversity Project
- Eric Posner, professor of law at University of Chicago Law School
- Nicholas Quinn Rosenkranz, professor of law at Georgetown University Law Center
- Ilya Somin, professor of law at George Mason University School of Law
- Todd Zywicki, professor of law at George Mason University School of Law

Articles are often posted by guest law professors who are not among the listed conspirators.
