= Aharon Shabtai =

Israeli poet and translator (born 1939)

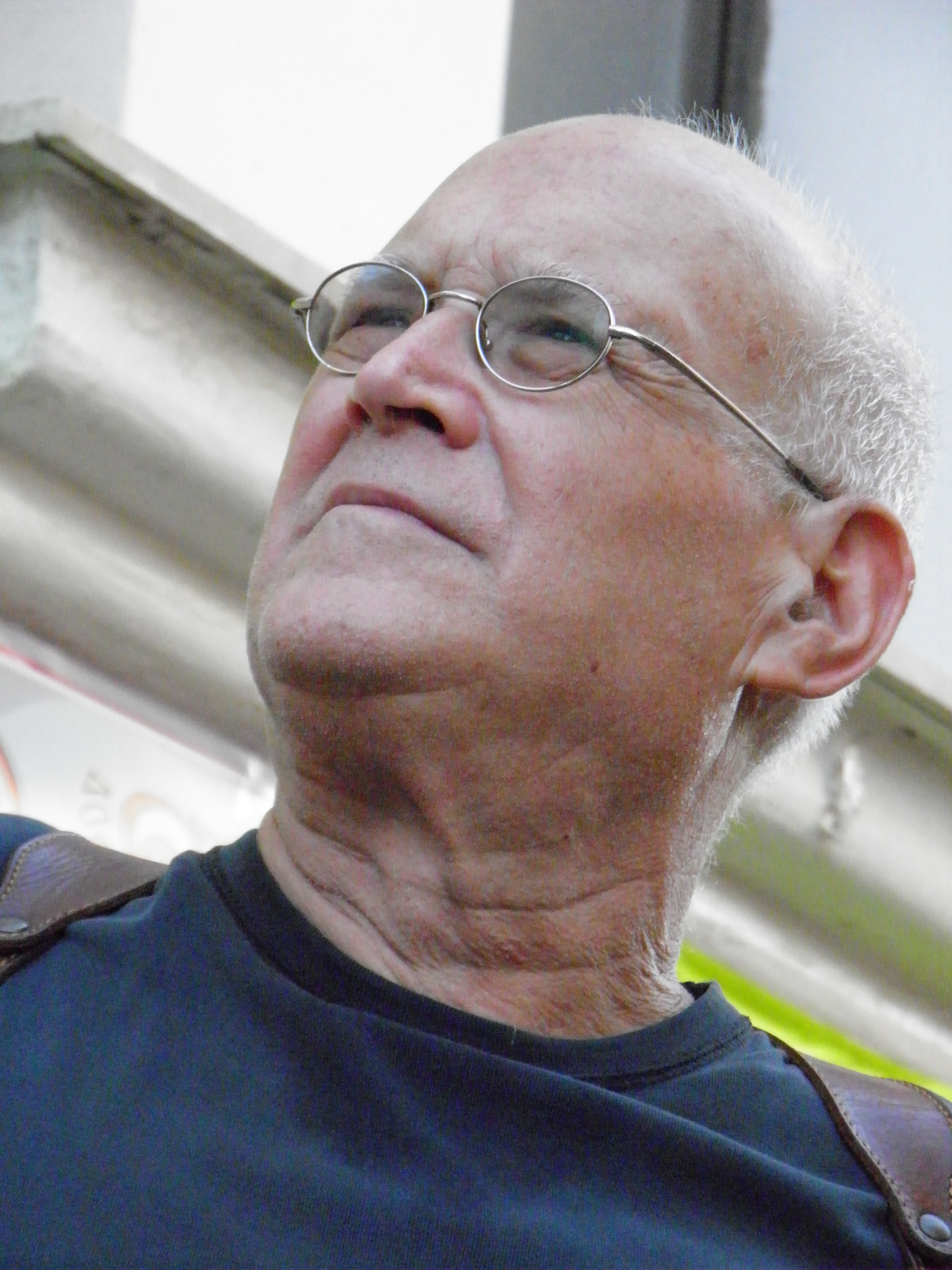
Aharon Shabtai

Aharon Shabtai (Hebrew: אהרון שבתאי; born April 11, 1939) is an Israeli poet and translator.

== Biography ==
Aharon Shabtai studied Greek and philosophy in Jerusalem, at the Sorbonne and at Cambridge, and he teaches literature in Tel Aviv University. He has published some 20 books of poetry in Hebrew, and English translations of his work have appeared in the American Poetry Review, the London Review of Books, and Parnassus: Poetry in Review.

His poetic style has varied over the years, from minimalist and romantic ("The Domestic Poem"), to erotic ("Ziva") and fiercely political ("Sun Sun").

He is the younger brother of Yaakov Shabtai, author of the novel Past Continuous, and was married to the linguist and political activist Professor Tanya Reinhart until her death in 2007. He is also the uncle of Hamutal Shabtai, who is a psychiatrist and a novelist.

== Awards and recognition ==
- In 1993, Shabtai received the Israeli Prime Minister's Prize For his translations.
- In 1999, Shabtai was awarded the Tchernichovsky Prize for exemplary translation.

== Books ==
=== In Hebrew ===
- Zima (Lust), Brosh, 2014 (with Jonathan Hirschfeld)
- Shemesh Shemesh (Sun Sun), Hargol, 2006
- Artzenu (Our Land), Ha-kibbutz ha-meuchad, 2002
- Politiqa (Politics), Even Hoshen, 1999
- Be-xodesh May ha-nifla’ (In the Wonderful Month of May), Siman Qri’a/ Ha-kibbutz ha-meuchad, 1997
- Ha-lev (The Heart), Siman Qri’a/ Ha-kibbutz ha-meuchad, 1995
- Metaziviqa (Metazivika), Zmora Bitan, 1992
- Ziva (Ziva), Zmora Bitan, 1990
- Gerushin (Divorce), Mosad Bialik, 1990
- Ahava (Love), ‛Am ‛Oved, 1988
- Begin (Begin), Keter, 1986
- Ha-hartza’a ha-rishona (The First Lecture), ‛Akhshav, 1985
- Sefer ha-klum (The Book of Nothing), Sifriyat Po‛alim, 1982
- Ha-xamor (The Donkey), ‛Eqed, 1982
- Xut (Thread), Proza, 1981
- Xara’, mavet (Shit, Death), ‛Akhshav, 1979
- Ha-po’ema ha-beytit (The Domestic Poem), Siman Qri’a, 1976
- Qibbutz (Kibbutz), Ha-kibbutz ha-meuchad, 1973
- Xadar ha-morim (Teachers’ Room), ‛Akhshav, 1966

=== In French ===
Le Poème Domestique, Editions de l’Éclat (Paris), 1987 La Première Lecture, Editions de l’Éclat (Paris), 1990

=== In English ===
Love and Other Poems, The Sheep Meadow Press (New York), 1997 J’accuse, New Directions (New York), 2003

== See also ==
- Hebrew literature
