= Past imperfect (disambiguation) =

The past imperfect (usually just called the imperfect) is a verb tense used in several languages.

Past Imperfect may also refer to:

== Television ==
- "Past Imperfect" (CSI: NY), a 2007 episode
- "Past Imperfect" (Doctors), a 2005 episode
- "Past Imperfect" (Holby City), a 2007 episode
- "Past Imperfect" (Roseanne), a 1994 episode

== Literature ==
- Past Imperfect: Facts, Fictions, and Fraud, a 2004 nonfiction book by Peter Charles Hoffer
- Past Imperfect: French Intellectuals, 1944-1956, a 1992 book by Tony Judt
- Past Imperfect (novel), a 2008 novel by Julian Fellowes
- Past Imperfect, a 2001 memoir by Grisha Bruskin
- Past Imperfect, a 2005 poetry collection by Suzanne Buffam
- Past Imperfect, a 1942 autobiography by Ilka Chase
- Past Imperfect, a 1978 autobiography by Joan Collins
- Past Imperfect, a 2001 science fiction anthology edited by Martin H. Greenberg
- Past Imperfect, a story series in the British comic 2000 AD

== Other uses ==
- Past Imperfect, a 1990s series of etchings by Yoshiko Shimada
- Past Imperfect, a 2008 album by the Wreckery

== See also ==
- Past perfect (disambiguation)
