= Todd Hasak-Lowy =

American novelist

- Born: Detroit, Michigan, U.S.
- Education: University of Michigan; University of California, Berkeley (PhD)
- Occupations: Novelist; essayist; writer
- Spouse: Taal Hasak-Lowy
- Children: 2
- Parent(s): Ron Lowy; Suzanne Levin
- Writing career
- Genres: Non-fiction; short story

Todd Hasak-Lowy is an American novelist, essayist, non-fiction and short story writer. Currently, he is a professor of Creative Writing and Literature at the School of the Art Institute of Chicago. He was formerly an Associate Professor of Hebrew Language and Literature at the University of Florida before moving to Evanston, Illinois to focus on writing. His first book, The Task of this Translator (Harcourt Books), a short story collection, was published in 2005. His first novel, Captives, appeared in fall 2008. 33 Minutes, his first middle-grade novel, was published in 2013, and Me Being Me is Exactly as Insane as You Being You, his first young adult novel was published in 2015. His next work was a narrative memoir for readers aged 9–13, Somewhere There is Still a Sun, co-written with Holocaust survivor Michael Gruenbaum, and published in 2015. It tells the story of Michael’s life from 1939-1945 in Prague and, later, the Terezin Concentration Camp. Roses & Radicals: The Epic Story of How American Women Won the Right to Vote was published in 2018. Hasak-Lowy's latest work, published in 2020, is We Are Power: How Nonviolent Activism Changes the World.

== Early life ==
Hasak-Lowy was born in Detroit, Michigan and raised in its suburbs by his father, Ron Lowy, an architect, and his mother, Suzanne Levin. He was the eldest of three boys. Hasak-Lowy is Jewish. His elder brother, Jordan, became a practitioner of Chinese medicine. His younger brother, Adam, became a Jewish educator.

Hasak-Lowy describes "the most important part" of his childhood as attending Habonim Camp Tavor in Three Rivers, Michigan, part of the Habonim-Dror youth movement. After graduating from high school, he spent a year in Israel living on a kibbutz working on irrigation.

Upon returning from Israel, Hasak-Lowy attended the University of Michigan, majoring in Near Eastern and North African Studies. He describes himself as "knowing by around age 20 that [he] wanted to become a professor, and I knew that I wanted to study Israel and the Middle East."

Hasak-Lowy decided to study Comparative Literature. He attended the University of California, Berkeley for eight years beginning in 1994. He studied Hebrew and Arabic literature, receiving his PhD in 2002.

== Career ==
=== First books ===
In 2002, Hasak-Lowy relocated with his wife, Taal, and daughter, Ariel, to Gainesville, Florida for a position teaching Hebrew language and literature at the University of Florida. During his time in Gainesville, his second daughter, Noam, was born. Hasak-Lowy taught at the University of Florida for eight years, earning tenure in 2009.

In 2005, he published a book of short stories entitled The Task of This Translator. It was reviewed positively by Richard Eder in the New York Times, who described the author's "explosive originality: a mix of zany wit, reverse-spin writing and enlarged purpose." Hasak-Lowy published his first novel, Captives, in 2008, and a book-length academic study, Here and Now: History, Nationalism, and Realism in Hebrew Fiction.

=== Relocation to Chicago and writing for younger readers ===
Hasak-Lowy describes a growing tension between his academic work and creative writing, which—along with other reasons—resulted in his family relocating to Evanston, Illinois in 2010. He began to teach literature at the School of the Art Institute of Chicago and expanded his writing to include works for children and young adults. Published in 2013, 33 Minutes was his first middle-school novel, detailing the changing nature of a friendship between two boys, followed by the Young Adult title Me Being Me is Exactly as Insane as You Being You, a novel written in lists published in 2015.

Hasak-Lowy's next projects for younger readers combined collaboration, extensive research and storytelling. Somewhere There Is Still a Sun, also published in 2015, tells the story of Holocaust survivor Michael Gruenbaum. Roses & Radicals: The Epic Story of How American Women Won the Right to Vote, co-written with Susan Zimet, is a history of the women's suffrage movement in the United States published in 2018.

Hasak-Lowy's latest work, published in 2020, is We Are Power: How Nonviolent Activism Changes the World.

Several of Hasak-Lowy's works have been translated into other languages.

=== Translation work ===
In addition to his own creative writing, Hasak-Lowy began translating Hebrew literature into English in 2009. His first translation, of Asaf Schurr’s novel Motti, came out in 2011. It won the Risa Domb/Porjes Hebrew-English Translation Prize in 2013. Hasak-Lowy's subsequent translation work includes Dror Burstein's Netanya, Dror Mishani's A Possibility of Violence, and Orly Castel-Bloom's An Egyptian Novel.

=== Creative inspiration ===
Hasak-Lowy describes the creative spark that led him to write occurring early in graduate school, while studying narrative and reading a comic book in the spirit of R. Crumb or Harvey Pekar. He cites two novels, Nicholson Baker's The Mezzanine and Yaakov Shabtai's Past Continuous, as the catalyst for the forming of his creative voice.
