= Arming America =

Discredited 2000 book

Arming America: The Origins of a National Gun Culture
- Author: Michael A. Bellesiles
- Genre: History
- Publisher: Alfred A. Knopf
- Publication date: 2000
- Publication place: United States
- Pages: 603
- ISBN: 0-375-40210-1
- Dewey Decimal: 683.4/00973 21
- LC Class: HV8059.B395 2000

Arming America: The Origins of a National Gun Culture is a discredited 2000 book by historian Michael A. Bellesiles about American gun culture, an expansion of a 1996 article he published in The Journal of American History. Bellesiles, then a professor at Emory University, used research missing context to argue that during the early period of US history, guns were uncommon during peacetime and that a culture of gun ownership did not arise until the mid-nineteenth century.

Although the book was awarded the prestigious Bancroft Prize in 2001, it later became the first work for which the prize was rescinded, following a decision of Columbia University's Board of Trustees that Bellesiles had "violated basic norms of scholarship and the high standards expected of Bancroft Prize winners."

== Thesis ==
The thesis of Arming America is that gun culture in the United States did not have roots in the colonial and early national period but arose during the 1850s and 1860s. The book argues that guns were uncommon during peacetime in the United States during the colonial, early national, and antebellum periods, that guns were seldom used then and that the average American's proficiency in use of firearms was poor. Bellesiles maintains that more widespread use and ownership of guns dated to the Civil War, a period of widespread advance in firearm manufacturing and a consequent reduction in price and improvement in accuracy.

== Scrutiny ==
The book garnered many enthusiastic professional reviews and won the prestigious Bancroft Prize in 2001. The book's thesis bore upon ongoing political controversies around gun control and the Second Amendment, and many gun rights advocates criticized it. Actor Charlton Heston, then-president of the National Rifle Association, described the book's argument as "ludicrous."

Conversely, Roger Lane's review in The Journal of American History said that the book's research was “meticulous and thorough.” He wrote that Bellesiles had "attacked the central myth behind the National Rifle Association's interpretation of the Second Amendment." Lane declared Bellesiles’ evidence so formidable that "if the subject were open to rational argument," the debate would be over. Peter S. Onuf called the book "a myth-busting tour-de-force."

Several apparent errors and distortions were first identified by Clayton Cramer, an amateur historian and gun enthusiast. Cramer, who had been skeptical of Bellesiles' thesis since reading his 1996 article, later argued that the reason "why historians swallowed Arming America's preposterous claims so readily is that it fit into their political worldview so well... they didn’t even pause to consider the possibility that something wasn’t right." Historian Peter Charles Hoffer, an advocate of gun control, lent support to Cramer's charge when, in a 2004 examination of the Bellesiles case, he noted that influential members of the historical profession had "taken strong public stands on violence in our society and its relation to gun control." For instance, the academics solicited for blurbs by Bellesiles’ publisher Alfred A. Knopf "were ecstatic in part because the book knocked the gun lobby."

According to Hoffer, Bellesiles energized this professional consensus by attempting to play "the professors against the NRA in a high-wire act of arrogant bravado." For instance, he replied to Heston’s criticism by telling the actor to earn a Ph.D. before criticizing the work of scholars. He pointed out that Cramer was "a long time advocate of unrestricted gun ownership" while he was a scholar who had "certain obligations of accuracy that transcend current political benefit." After Bellesiles said he had been flooded by hate mail, both the American Historical Association and the Organization of American Historians endorsed a resolution condemning the harassment. As Hoffer later wrote, Bellesiles was convinced that whether the entire profession agreed with "his stance on gun ownership (and I suspect most did), surely academic historians would not let their expertise be impugned by a rank and partisan amateur like Cramer."

In the end, according to Robert C Williams, the politics of the issue mattered less to historians "than the possibility that Bellesiles might have engaged in faulty, fraudulent, and unethical research." As critics subjected the historical claims of the book to close scrutiny, they demonstrated that much of Bellesiles' research, particularly his handling of probate records, was inaccurate and possibly fraudulent. This criticism included noting several serious errors in the tables published in the book, as well as in the Journal of American History article, namely, that they did not provide a total number of cases and gave percentages that "were clearly wrong."

In two scholarly articles, law professor James Lindgren of Northwestern University noted that in Arming America, Bellesiles had

- purported to count guns in about a hundred wills from 17th- and 18th-century Providence, Rhode Island, but these did not exist because the decedents had died intestate (i.e., without wills);
- purported to count nineteenth-century San Francisco County probate inventories, but these had been destroyed in the 1906 earthquake and fire; on this point, Bellesilles claimed he had actually consulted the more complete archives at nearby Contra Costa County, but the committee also disputed this claim
- reported a national mean for gun ownership in 18th-century probate inventories that was mathematically impossible;
- misreported the condition of guns described in probate records in a way that accommodated his thesis, as for instance, claiming that in Providence records most guns were listed as old or broken when fewer than 10% were so listed;
- miscited the counts of guns in nineteenth-century Massachusetts censuses and militia reports,
- had more than a 60% error rate in finding guns listed as part of estates in Vermont records; and
- had a 100% error rate in the cited gun-related homicide cases of seventeenth-century Plymouth Colony.

Critics also identified problems with Bellesiles's methods of citation. Cramer noted that Bellesiles had misrepresented a passage by George Washington about the quality of three poorly prepared militia units as if his criticism applied to the militia in general. (Washington had noted that the three units were exceptions to the rule.) Cramer wrote, "It took me twelve hours of hunting before I found a citation that was completely correct. In the intervening two years, I have spent thousands of hours chasing down Bellesiles’s citations, and I have found many hundreds of shockingly gross falsifications."

== Emory investigation and resignation ==
As criticism increased and charges of scholarly misconduct were made, Emory University conducted an internal inquiry into Bellesiles's integrity, appointing an independent investigative committee composed of three leading academic historians from outside Emory. Bellesiles failed to provide investigators with his research notes, claiming the notes were destroyed in a flood.

In the initial hardcover edition of the book, Bellesiles did not give the total number of probate records which he had investigated, but the following year, after the flood, Bellesiles included in the paperback edition the claim that he had investigated 11,170 probate records. "By his own account," writes Hoffer, "the flood had destroyed all but a few loose papers of his data. It was a mystery how supposedly lost original data could reappear to enable him to add the number of cases to the 2001 paperback edition, then disappear once again when the committee of inquiry sought the data from him" (Hoffer, 153). One critic tried, unsuccessfully, to destroy penciled notes on yellow pads by submerging them in his bathtub, in order to prove that water damage would not have destroyed Bellesiles' notes.

The scholarly investigation confirmed that Bellesiles' work had serious flaws, calling into question both its quality and veracity. The external report on Bellesiles concluded that "every aspect of his work in the probate records is deeply flawed" and called his statements in self-defense "prolix, confusing, evasive, and occasionally contradictory." It concluded that "his scholarly integrity is seriously in question" and that he was in violation of the American Historical Association's standards of scholarly integrity.

Bellesiles disputed these findings, claiming to have followed all scholarly standards and to have corrected all errors of fact known to him. Nevertheless, with his "reputation in tatters," Bellesiles issued a statement on October 25, 2002, announcing the resignation of his professorship at Emory by year's end. In 2010 he published his first book since the scandal, 1877: America's Year of Living Violently, with The New Press while working as adjunct professor at Central Connecticut State University. In 2012 Bellesiles was working as a bartender while continuing to write history.

== Aftermath of the scandal ==
In 2002, the trustees of Columbia University rescinded Arming America's Bancroft Prize, the first such action in the history of the prize. Alfred A. Knopf, publisher of Arming America, did not renew Bellesiles' contract, and the National Endowment for the Humanities withdrew its name from a fellowship that the Newberry Library had granted Bellesiles. In 2003, Arming America was republished in a revised and amended edition by Soft Skull Press. Bellesiles continued to defend the book's credibility and thesis, arguing that roughly three-quarters of the original book remained unchallenged. In a 2019 podcast interview with Daniel Gullotta, Bellesiles blamed the controversy on his decision not to publish his book through a university press. He also disputed claims that he had written the book with a left-wing agenda, claiming he had identified as a Burkean conservative Republican trying to dispute the idea that gun violence was an inherent part of American culture and that white Americans in the 18th and early 19th centuries were “mass murderers" and "genocidal lunatics."

Historians who initially admired Arming America ceased to defend Bellesiles. The nationally prominent historian Garry Wills, who had enthusiastically reviewed Arming America for the New York Times, later said, in a 2005 interview on C-SPAN, "I was took. The book is a fraud." Wills noted that Bellesiles "claimed to have consulted archives he didn't and he misrepresented those archives," although "he didn't have to do that," since "he had a lot of good, solid evidence." Wills added, "People get taken by very good con men."

Historian Roger Lane, who had reviewed the book positively in The Journal of American History, offered a similar opinion: "It is entirely clear to me that he's made up a lot of these records. He's betrayed us. He's betrayed the cause. It's 100 percent clear that the guy is a liar and a disgrace to my profession. He's breached that trust." Historian Pauline Maier reflected that it seemed historians had "ceased to read carefully and critically, even in the awarding of book prizes."

However, some scholars and commentators continued to defend Bellesilles. Jon Wiener claimed in his book Historians in Trouble: Plagiarism, Fraud, and Politics in the Ivory Tower that Bellesilles had been the victim of a politicized witch hunt.

As Hoffer concluded, "Bellesiles's condemnation by Emory University, the trustees of the Bancroft Prizes, and Knopf provided the gun lobby with information to blast the entire history profession....Even though H-Law, the Omohundro Institute, the OAH, and the AHA rushed to his side and stated principled objections to the politicization of history, they hesitated to ask the equally important question of whether he had manipulated them and betrayed their trust."

== See also ==
- Confirmation bias
- Past Imperfect: Facts, Fictions, Fraud—American History from Bancroft and Parkman to Ambrose, Bellesiles, Ellis, and Goodwin by Peter Charles Hoffer

== Editions of the Book ==
- Arming America: The Origins of a National Gun Culture (New York: Alfred A. Knopf, 2000) ISBN 0-375-70198-2
- Arming America: The Origins of a National Gun Culture, 2d ed. (Brooklyn, New York: Soft Skull Press, 2003) ISBN 1-932360-07-7
