= Jay Clark =

Jay Clark may refer to:

- Jay Clark (coach), American collegiate gymnastics coach
- Jay Clark (sport shooter) (1880–1948), American sport shooter

== See also ==
- Jay Clarke (disambiguation)
- Jason Clark (disambiguation)
- Jason Clarke (born 1969), Australian actor
- Jason Clarke (designer), Canadian production designer and art director
- Jason Clarke (writer) (born 1978), American writer and web developer
- Josh Clarke (footballer, born 1994), English professional footballer with the third name 'Jason'
