= Jason Clark =

Jason Clark may refer to:

- Jason Clark (darts player) (born 1969), British darts player
- Jason Clark (rugby league) (born 1989), Australian rugby league player
- Jason Clark (basketball) (born 1990), American basketball player
- J. Clark (Jason Crowe Clark), American musician

== See also ==
- Jason Clarke (born 1969), Australian actor
- Jason Clarke (designer), Canadian production designer and art director
- Jason Clarke (writer) (born 1978), American writer and web developer
- Josh Clarke (footballer, born 1994), English professional footballer with the third name 'Jason'
- Jay Clarke (disambiguation)
- Jay Clark (disambiguation)
