= Uncle Peretz Takes Off =

Short story collection by Yaakov Shabtai

1993 edition (publ. Mosaic Press)

Uncle Peretz Takes Off (הדוד פרץ ממריא, Ha-Dod Peretz Mamree in Hebrew), is a collection of short stories by Israeli writer Yaakov Shabtai. An English translation by Dalya Bilu was published in 2004. The stories present a gallery of characters in Tel Aviv of the 1940s, including Uncle Shmuel who tries to make his fortune as a poulterer, the nude model Tamara Bell, and Albert Weiss-Fink, who dreams of bringing a traveling circus to Palestine.

== Writing and Publication history ==
The thirteen stories which make up the first edition of the collection were all written between 1966 and 1971, when Yaakov Shabtai was in his thirties, and still mostly focused on his work as a playwright. Following his experience with these stories, Shabtai decided to dedicate himself to prose. Once the collection was published he turned to writing novels, and never attempted to write short stories again.

The first Hebrew edition of the book was published in 1972 and included thirteen stories. An expanded edition, including seven previously unpublished stories from Shabtai's estate, was published posthumously in 1985. The English edition includes the 13 original stories and one additional story, "The Czech Tea Service", from the new collection.

== The Stories ==
=== The original stories ===
Shabtai paid close attention to the overall structure of the collection, believing that it also reflected the internal ideas of the stories. Though at first the book included additional stories, such as "The Gospel according to Lucas," Shabtai decided to leave them out since they did not fit the overall structure.

Seven of the stories - the first five and the final two - deal with memory and serve as a frame for the book. The first story, "Adoshem", recounts the narrator's Bar Mitzvah, while the last story, "Departure", presents the death of his grandmother. the character of the narrator reappears in all seven of these "memory" stories, as either protagonist or witness. All the stories in the collection except two, "Cordoba" and "The Voyage to Mauritius", take place in Tel Aviv.

The thirteen stories, in order, are:

- Adoshem
- Model
- True Tenderness
- Uncle Shmuel
- A Marriage Proposal
- Past Continuous
- Cordoba
- Twilight
- The Voyage to Mauritius
- A Private and Very Awesome Leopard
- Uncle Peretz Takes Off
- The Visit
- Departure

=== The estate stories ===
Shabtai deemed these seven stories as unfitting for the collection; they were later added by his wife, who managed his estate, as the first volume in a series which would publish Shabtai's complete literary output. Except for "The Czech Tea Service," none of these stories were translated into English and their titles are direct translations of the original Hebrew names.

The seven stories are:

- Family - an early draft of "A Private and Very Awesome Leopard"
- The Czech Tea Service - partly integrated into the novel Past Continuous
- Lesson
- Chardash
- Love Adventure
- A Wick from the Cathedral Bell's Rope
- The Gospel according to Lucas
