= Jay Clarke =

Jay Clarke may refer to:

- Jay Clarke, American musician also known as Ash Black Bufflo
- Jay Clarke, real name of English DJ Jodie Harsh
- Jay Clarke (tennis) (born 1998), British tennis player
- Nig Clarke (1882–1949), Jay "Nig" Clarke, baseball player

== See also ==
- Jay Clark (disambiguation)
- Jason Clark (disambiguation)
- Jason Clarke (born 1969), Australian actor
- Jason Clarke (designer), Canadian production designer and art director
- Jason Clarke (writer) (born 1978), American writer and web developer
- Josh Clarke (footballer, born 1994), English professional footballer with the third name 'Jason'
