= Stupid White Men =

2001 book by American filmmaker Michael Moore

Stupid White Men ...and Other Sorry Excuses for the State of the Nation!
- U.S. cover
- Author: Michael Moore
- Language: English
- Subject: Politics of the United States
- Publisher: Harper
- Publication date: 2001
- Publication place: United States
- Media type: Hardback, paperback, e-book
- ISBN: 0-06-039245-2
- OCLC: 49040476
- LC Class: E902 .M66 2001

Stupid White Men ...and Other Sorry Excuses for the State of the Nation! is a book by American filmmaker Michael Moore published in 2001. Although the publishers were convinced it would be rejected by the American reading public after the September 11 attacks, it spent 50 consecutive weeks on New York Times Best Seller list (including eight weeks at number 1) for hardcover nonfiction and went to 53 printings. It is generally known by its short title, Stupid White Men.

The book is highly critical of then-recent U.S. government policies in general, especially the policies of the Clinton and then-nascent Bush administrations. Moore's "A Prayer to Afflict the Comfortable" was originally published in this book.

== Publication issues ==
Moore completed Stupid White Men shortly before the September 11, 2001 attacks. His publisher, HarperCollins, initially refused to release the book, fearing bad publicity in the wake of the attacks (despite an advance printing of over 50,000 copies).

HarperCollins wanted Moore to rewrite half of the book. They asked him to tone down criticism of George W. Bush, who had just been elected as President. They also wanted to change the title to Michael Moore: The American and remove the chapters "Kill Whitey" (which criticizes what Moore perceives as negative aspects of white American culture), "Dear George" (a negative open letter to Bush), and "A Very American Coup" (which discusses the election in Florida and accuses the Bush campaign of winning via electoral fraud). Furthermore, they demanded that Moore personally pay the $100,000 cost of printing the revised book. If he didn't comply, they would abandon the project and pulp the copies already printed. In the book, Moore suggests that Rupert Murdoch, owner of News Corporation and HarperCollins, "passed down" this decision.

On December 1, Moore made a presentation in New Brunswick, New Jersey. He told the audience about the struggle to get his book published and that the only copies in existence were about to be recycled and probably would come back as Rush Limbaugh or Bill O'Reilly books. Moore read the first chapters of his book to the group. In the audience that day was Ann Sparanese, a librarian from Englewood, New Jersey. Sparanese sent word to various email lists including the Social Responsibilities Round Table (SRRT) and Library Juice, explaining Moore's predicament. She said, "[T]his battle wasn't just one man's struggle with a publishing house, but was a battle to preserve free speech and to stop censorship". Moore was unaware of this until he received an angry phone call from HarperCollins two days after the reading.

Despite HarperCollins' predictions—and, according to Moore, their deliberately limited promotion of the book—it became enormously popular, becoming the highest-selling nonfiction book in 2002 at such major outlets as Barnes & Noble and Amazon.com. It became the top-selling title in its native United States and other countries including the United Kingdom (including being the number one seller on Amazon.co.uk before a British printing was even proposed), Germany, and Ireland.

This book and other works by Moore were subsequently criticized in another book, Michael Moore Is a Big Fat Stupid White Man, which HarperCollins published.
