= David Bernstein (law professor) =

American academic (born 1967)

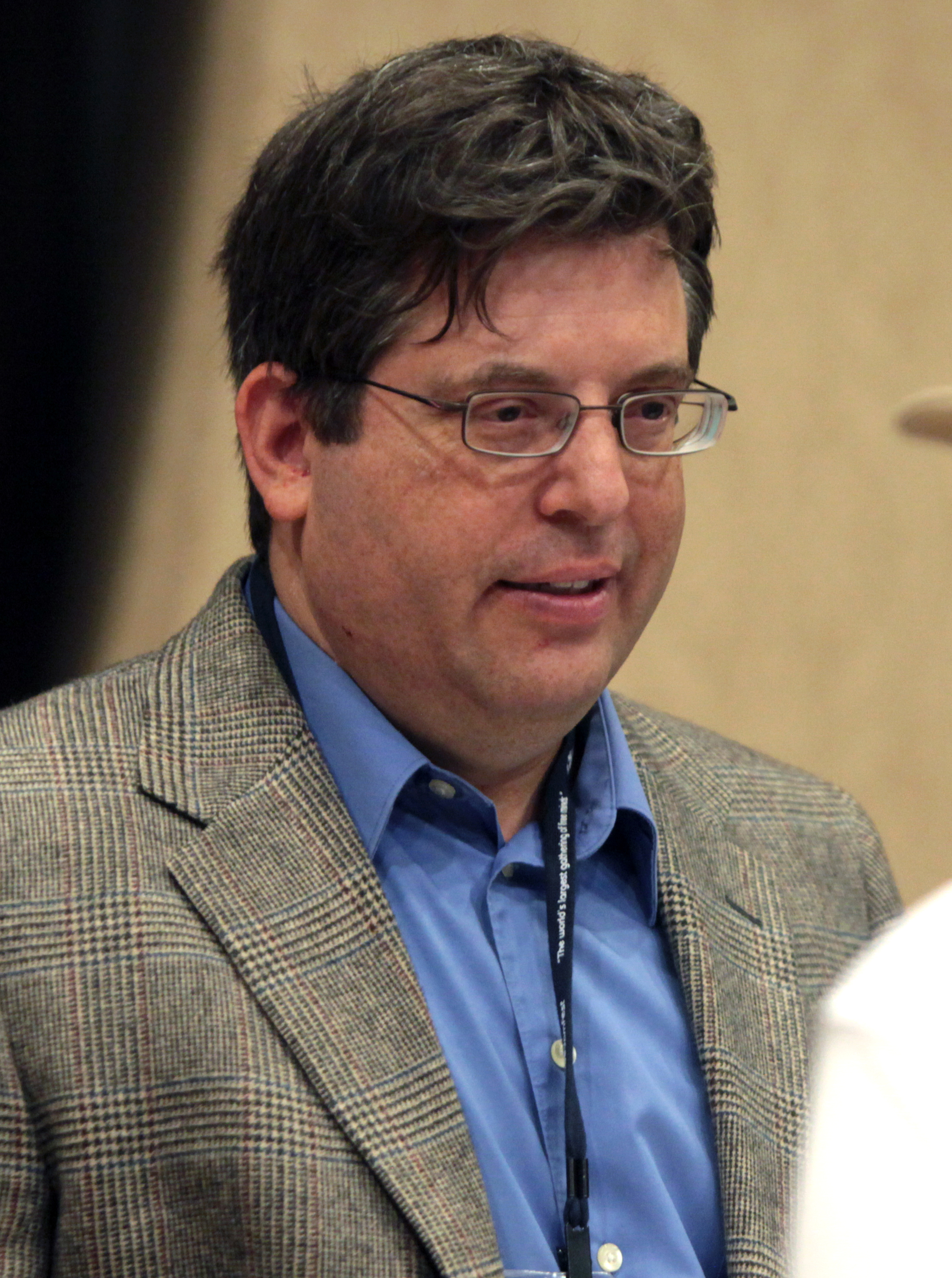
- Born: 1967 (age 58–59)
- Education: Brandeis University (BA); Yale University (JD)
- Occupations: Law professor, author
- Known for: The Volokh Conspiracy

David E. Bernstein (born 1967) is an American legal scholar at the George Mason University School of Law in Arlington, Virginia, where he has taught since 1995. His primary areas of scholarly research are constitutional history and the admissibility of expert testimony. Bernstein is a contributor to the legal blog The Volokh Conspiracy. Bernstein is a graduate of the Yale Law School, where he was a John M. Olin Fellow in Law, Economics and Public Policy, a Claude Lambe Fellow of the Institute for Humane Studies, and a senior editor of the Yale Law Journal. He received his undergraduate degree from Brandeis University.

== Books ==
- Classified: The Untold Story of Racial Classification in America, Bombardier Press, 2022, ISBN 978-1637581735
- Lawless: The Obama Administrations Unprecedented Assault on the Constitution and the Rule of Law, Encounter, 2015, ISBN 978-1594038334
- A Conspiracy Against Obamacare: The Volokh Conspiracy and the Health Care Case (co-author with several others), Palgrave MacMillan, 2013.ISBN 1137363746
- Rehabilitating Lochner: Defending Individual Rights against Progressive Reform, University of Chicago Press, 2011, ISBN 978-0-226-04353-1
- You Can't Say That: The Growing Threat to Civil Liberties from Antidiscrimination Laws, Cato Institute, 2003, ISBN 978-1-930865-53-2
- The New Wigmore: Expert Evidence (treatise, with Kaye and Mnookin) Aspen Publishers, 2004, ISBN 978-0-7355-4555-7
- Only One Place of Redress: African Americans, Labor Regulations and the Supreme Court from Reconstruction to the New Deal, Duke University Press, 2001, ISBN 978-0-8223-2583-3
- Phantom Risk: Scientific Inference and the Law (co-editor, with Foster and Huber) The MIT Press, 1999, ISBN 978-0-262-56119-8
