= Aviezer Ya'ari =

Israeli general (1930–2026)

- אביעזר יערי
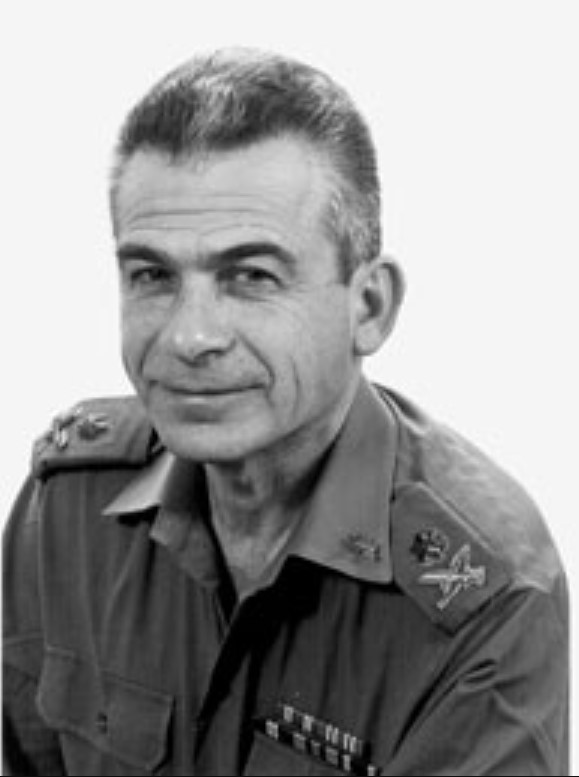
- Ya'ari in 1986
- Born: 24 February 1930; Merhavia, Mandatory Palestine
- Died: 27 July 2026 (aged 96); Tel Aviv, Israel
- Relatives: Meir Ya'ari (father)
- Military career
- Allegiance: Israel
- Branch: Israel Defense Forces
- Rank: Aluf (Major General)
- Commands: Israel National Defense College; Head of Research Division, Aman
- Conflicts: 1948 Arab–Israeli War; Six-Day War; Yom Kippur War

Aviezer Ya'ari (Hebrew: אביעזר יערי; 24 February 1930 – 27 July 2026) was an Israel Defense Forces Major General who served as the head of the Military Intelligence and commander of the Israel National Defense College.

== Early life and career ==
Aviezer Ya'ari was born in Merhavia, Mandatory Palestine on 24 February 1930. He was the son of Meir Ya'ari, leader of the Hashomer Hatzair, and his wife, Anda Ya'ari. He joined the Haganah and participated in many defenses of Israel. He studied secondary at Mishmar HaEmek after moving there at age 12 from Merhavia. In 1977, during his military career in the Israel Defense Forces, Ya'ari studied at the Israel National Defense College. He graduated in 1978 before getting a role as head of the Research Division in Military Intelligence.

Ya'ari began his military career in 1948 by joining the Palmach and later serving in the Golani Brigade and the 7th Armored Brigade. After completing an officer course in 1949, he left the Brigade to return to Merhavia. He served as a reservist in the 9th Infantry Brigade, with which he fought in the Battle of Tel Motilla in 1951 and the Suez Crisis in 1956. He participated in the battles in the Golan Heights during the Six-Day War.

He rejoined the military career as the intelligence officer in the Military Intelligence Directorate. In 1971, he was promoted to Lieutenant Colonel and was responsible for intelligence analysis on Syria, Lebanon, and Iraq. On 1 October 1973, five days before the Yom Kippur War, he got a signal of the Egyptian and Syrian attacks and warned operational commanders, including Albert Mandler. However, he was reprimanded by his superiors for contradicting Aman's official assessment that war will not happen soon. Following the war, Ya'ari was promoted to Colonel and named head of Northern Command Intelligence in 1975 under Rafael Eitan. In 1978, he was appointed the Assistant to the Head of Military Intelligence for Research. During debates of the Operation Opera, he supported striking Iraq's Osirak nuclear reactor. He took a counter stance to his directorate chief Yehoshua Sagi. During the 1982 Lebanon War, he advised Defense Minister Ariel Sharon against advancing IDF troops into Beirut. He continued his career as commander of the Israel National Defense College from 1983 until his retirement in 1987 with the rank of Aluf. He also served in the State Comptroller's Office as head of defense establishment oversight from 1987 to 2000.

== Personal life and death ==
Ya'ari was married to Sonia Ya'ari, they had three daughters together. Then, he married Aya Luft, a veterinarian, who died in 2015.

Ya'ari died in Tel Aviv on 27 July 2026, at the age of 96.
