= Joyce Lee Malcolm =

American historian (born 1941)

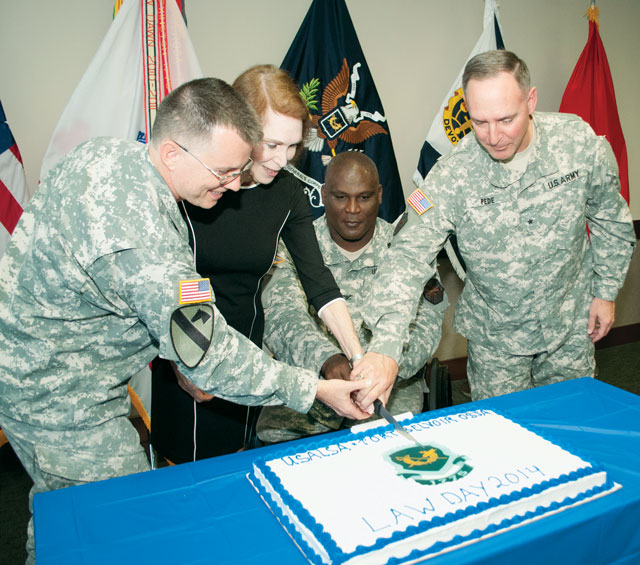
Joyce Malcolm with U.S. Army lawyers and Gregory Gadson on Law Day in 2014

Joyce Lee Malcolm (born October 17, 1941) is the Patrick Henry Professor of Constitutional Law and the Second Amendment at George Mason University School of Law. She has been called "the leading historian on the history of English gun control and gun rights" by David Kopel.

== Education ==
Malcolm received her B.A. from Barnard College and her M.A. and Ph.D. from Brandeis University.

== Career ==
Malcolm taught at Bentley University from 1988 to 2006, serving as an associate professor of history for the first four of these years and a full professor for the remaining fourteen. In 2006, she joined George Mason University and became the Patrick Henry Professor of Constitutional Law and the Second Amendment there, a position she has held ever since. The position is wholly funded by the National Rifle Association of America (NRA). Her other positions prior to joining George Mason University included professorships at Princeton University, Boston University, Northeastern University and Cambridge University.

== Work on the Second Amendment and gun control ==
Malcolm is the author of the book To Keep and Bear Arms: The Origins of an Anglo-American Right, published in 1994 by Harvard University Press. The book details the origin of the Second Amendment in the American Constitution, which, according to the book, lies in a British tradition of maintaining a civilian army to counteract tyranny. In the book, Malcolm also claims that beginning in the 14th century, even as firearm ownership became more common over the following five centuries, violent crime rates declined. She has been called one of the five "inner circle" proponents of the "Standard Model" interpretation of the Second Amendment, along with Robert J. Cottrol, Stephen P. Halbrook, Don B. Kates, and Robert E. Shalhope.

=== Views on gun control ===
In 2012, Malcolm wrote an opinion piece for the Wall Street Journal stating that strict gun control laws enacted after mass shootings in Britain and Australia "haven't made their people noticeably safer, nor have they prevented massacres." The following year, she told PBS NewsHour that she thought the Assault Weapons Ban of 2013 was unconstitutional because recent Supreme Court decisions had found that the Second Amendment protects an individual right to own guns that are commonly used for protection.

== Other work ==
Malcolm is also the author of Peter's War: A New England Slave Boy and the American Revolution, a 2009 book that tells the story of the American Revolution from the perspective of an enslaved boy named Peter Sharon, who fought in the colonies' army during the war and a biography of Benedict Arnold entitled The Tragedy of Benedict Arnold: An American Life.

== Awards and honors ==
Malcolm is a fellow of the Royal Historical Society, and Peter's War: A New England Slave Boy and the American Revolution was nominated for a Pulitzer Prize in 2010.
