= Clayton Cramer =

American amateur historian, author, gun enthusiast, and software engineer

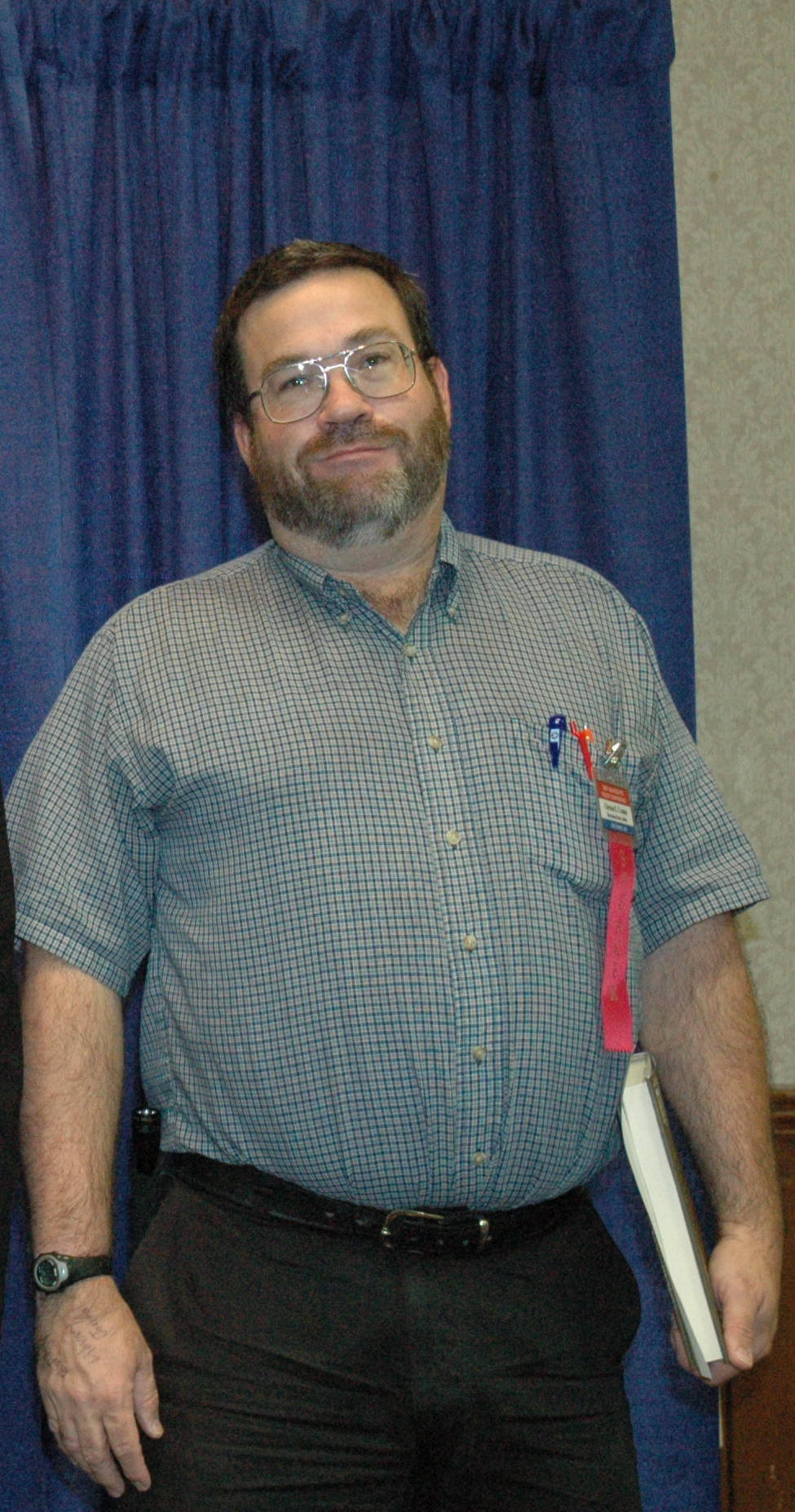
Clayton Cramer

Clayton E. Cramer is an American historian, author and gun rights activist. He played an important early role in documenting errors in the book Arming America by Michael A. Bellesiles.

His work was cited by the United States District Court for the Northern District of Texas in United States v. Emerson, 46 F.Supp.2d 598 (N.D.Tex. 1999). His research also informed the Supreme Court decision in the Second Amendment cases District of Columbia v. Heller and McDonald v. Chicago.

== Arming America controversy ==
In 1996, while working on his master's thesis, Cramer read a paper by Bellesiles on early gun laws, published in the Journal of American History. This paper formed a basis for Bellesiles' later book, Arming America. Cramer's thesis "examined the development of concealed weapon laws in the early Republic", believing Bellesiles' paper contradicted his own knowledge of gun availability in early America.

Cramer was later sent an early review copy of Arming America: The Origins of a National Gun Culture. Upon reading it, Cramer immediately noted significant discrepancies with what he knew of American history, particularly at the time of the American Revolution. He began checking facts and discovered that many of Bellesiles' citations and quotes did not match the historical record. "I sat down with a list of bizarre, amazing claims that Bellesiles had made, and started chasing down the citations at Sonoma State University’s library. I found quotations out of context that completely reversed the author’s original intent. I found dates changed. I found the text of statutes changed — and the changes completely reversed the meaning of the law. It took me twelve hours of hunting before I found a citation that was completely correct."

Cramer's research encountered resistance from journal editors and other historians, but he continued alleging fraud against Bellesiles' scholarship. Other critics, including James Lindgren of Northwestern University, supported Cramer's claims, and Emory University conducted an investigation which was strongly critical of Bellesiles' ethical standards. Bellesiles resigned his position at Emory on the day the report was released. On December 13, 2002, Bellesiles' Bancroft Prize was revoked by the Columbia University Board of Trustees.

== Other activities ==
In 2008, Cramer ran for Idaho State Senator from District 22 as a Republican, but was defeated in the primary.

Cramer is critical of making involuntary commitment of mentally ill persons difficult, and has researched and compiled a book explaining the origins of this policy.

== Publications ==
- By the Dim and Flaring Lamps: The Civil War Diary of Samuel McIlvaine. Monroe, NY: Library Research Associates. 1990. ISBN 0-912526-46-7.
- Cramer, Clayton E. (Winter 1993–1994). "Ethical Problems of Mass Murder Coverage in the Mass Media". Journal of Mass Media Ethics. 9 (1): 26–42. doi:10.1207/s15327728jmme0901_3. ISSN 0890-0523.
- For the defense of themselves and the state : the original intent and judicial interpretation of the right to keep and bear arms. Westport, CT: Praeger. 1994. ISBN 0-275-94913-3.
- Firing Back: A Clear, Simple Guide to Defending your Constitutional Right to Bear Arms. Iola, WI: Krause Publications. 1995. ISBN 0-87341-344-X.
- "The Racist Roots of Gun Control". Kansas Journal of Law & Public Policy. 42 (2): 17–25. Winter 1995. ISSN 1055-8942. Archived from the original on 2015-04-28.
- Cramer, Clayton; Kopel, David B. (Spring 1995). "Shall Issue: The New Wave of Concealed Handgun Permit Laws". Tennessee Law Review. 62 (3): 679–757. ISSN 0040-3288. Archived from the original on 2014-12-07.
- Cramer, Clayton; Kopel, David B.; Hattrup, Scott G. (Fall 1995). "A Tale of Three Cities: The Right to Bear Arms in State Supreme Courts". Temple Law Review. 68 (3): 1178–1241. ISSN 0899-8086.
- Black Demographic Data, 1790-1860: A Sourcebook. Westport, CT: Greenwood Press. 1997. ISBN 0-313-30243-X.
- Concealed Weapon Laws of the Early Republic: Dueling, Southern Violence, and Moral Reform. Westport, CT: Praeger. 1999. ISBN 0-275-96615-1.
- "Shots in the Dark (Review of Arming America: The Origins of a National Gun Culture, by Michael A. Bellesiles)". National Review Online. September 23–24, 2000. ISSN 0028-0038. Archived from the original on 2013-04-25.
- "Why Footnotes Matter: Checking Arming America's Claims" (PDF). Plagiary. 1 (11): 1–31. 2006. ISSN 1559-3096.
- Armed America: The Remarkable Story of How and Why Guns Became as American as Apple Pie. Nashville, TN: Nelson Current. 2007. ISBN 978-1-59555-069-9.
- My Brother Ron: A Personal and Social History of the Deinstitutionalization of the Mentally Ill. Scotts Valley, CA: CreateSpace Independent Publishing Platform. 2012. ISBN 978-1477667538.
- "On the right side of the bullet: More Americans protect themselves with guns than you think." Washington Times.February 9, 2012.
