= Past perfect (disambiguation) =

Past perfect is a verb tense which represents actions that occurred before other actions in the past.

Past perfect may also refer to:

- Past Perfect (novel), a 1984 novel by Yaakov Shabtai
- Pastperfect, a 2004 DVD by VNV Nation
- Past Perfect Future Tense, an album by Magne F
- Past Perfect (2003 film), an Italian film
- Past Perfect (1996 film), an action-science fiction film
- PastPerfect, a museum management software by PastPerfect Software Inc.

== See also ==
- Past tense,
- Perfect (grammar),
- Past perfect progressive (also known as past perfect continuous)
