= Michael Moore Is a Big Fat Stupid White Man =

2004 book by David T. Hardy and Jason Clarke

- Author: David T. Hardy; Jason Clarke
- Subject: Michael Moore
- Genre: Politics, parody, humor
- Publisher: Harper
- Publication date: 2004

Michael Moore Is a Big Fat Stupid White Man is a book by David T. Hardy and Jason Clarke about author and filmmaker Michael Moore, criticizing him and his works. The title can be seen as a parody of the titles Stupid White Men by Moore and Rush Limbaugh is a Big Fat Idiot by Al Franken. It was listed as a best-seller by The New York Times in August 2004.
