= Marty Lederman =

American government official

Academic background
- Education: University of Michigan (AB); Yale University (JD)

Academic work
- Discipline: Constitutional Law; National Security Law
- Institutions: Georgetown University Law Center

Martin "Marty" S. Lederman is the former Deputy Assistant Attorney General in the Department of Justice's Office of Legal Counsel (OLC), appointed by President Obama in January 2009. He previously served as an Attorney Advisor in OLC from 1994 to 2002. He has concentrated on questions involving freedom of speech, the Religion Clauses, congressional power and federalism, equal protection, separation of powers, copyright, and food and drug law.

Lederman helped draft the June 2010 memorandum authorizing the assassination of U.S. citizen and Islamic cleric Anwar al-Awlaki.. Lederman wrote an amicus curiae brief that was described as leading the

U.S. Supreme Court to decline an application for stay by the second Trump administration of a lower court ruling. The lower court had ruled against the administrations actions in Operation Midway Blitz.

== Career ==
Lederman is an associate professor of law at the Georgetown University Law Center. He teaches courses in constitutional law, separation of powers, and executive branch lawyering. When not serving in government, he has been a regular contributor to the weblogs SCOTUSblog and Balkinization. His blogging and scholarship focuses on matters related to executive power, detention, interrogation, civil liberties, and torture.

Lederman was formerly an attorney at Bredhoff & Kaiser, where his practice consisted principally of federal litigation, including appeals on behalf of labor unions, employees and pension funds, with particular emphasis on constitutional law, labor law, civil rights, Racketeer Influenced and Corrupt Organizations Act (RICO) and employment law. He graduated from University of Michigan and Yale Law School. He served as law clerk to then-Chief Judge Jack B. Weinstein, on the United States United States District Court for the Eastern District of New York, and to Judge Frank M. Coffin, on the United States Court of Appeals for the First Circuit.

In November 2020, Lederman was named a volunteer member of the Joe Biden presidential transition Agency Review Team to support transition efforts related to the United States Department of Justice. In early 2021, Lederman left Georgetown Law to join the Biden administration in the OLC as Deputy Assistant Attorney General. This was his third time serving at the OLC, where he was Deputy Assistant Attorney General from 2009 to 2010 and an Attorney Advisor from 1994 to 2002.
