= Past Imperfect: Facts, Fictions, and Fraud =

2004 book by Peter Charles Hoffer

- 2007 dust cover image
- Author: Peter Charles Hoffer
- Publication date: 2004
- ISBN: 978-1-586-48445-3

Past Imperfect: Facts, Fictions, and Fraud — American history from Bancroft and Parkman to Ambrose, Bellesiles, Ellis, and Goodwin is a 2004 non-fiction book, written by Peter Charles Hoffer, that covers the historiography of U.S. History in Part 1 and the controversies surrounding Stephen Ambrose, Michael Bellesiles, Joseph Ellis, and Doris Kearns Goodwin in Part 2. A second edition was released on July 3, 2007 in which the book was "revised and updated [and] edited with a new final chapter and conclusion."

== Reviews ==
- The American Archivist
- Journalism History
- Pacific Historical Review
- The Public Historian
- The Washington Post
- The Wilson Quarterly
