= Merhavia (kibbutz) =

Kibbutz in Northern Israel

Merhavia: מֶרְחַבְיָה (Hebrew)

Hebrew transcription(s)
  - Standard: Merhavya
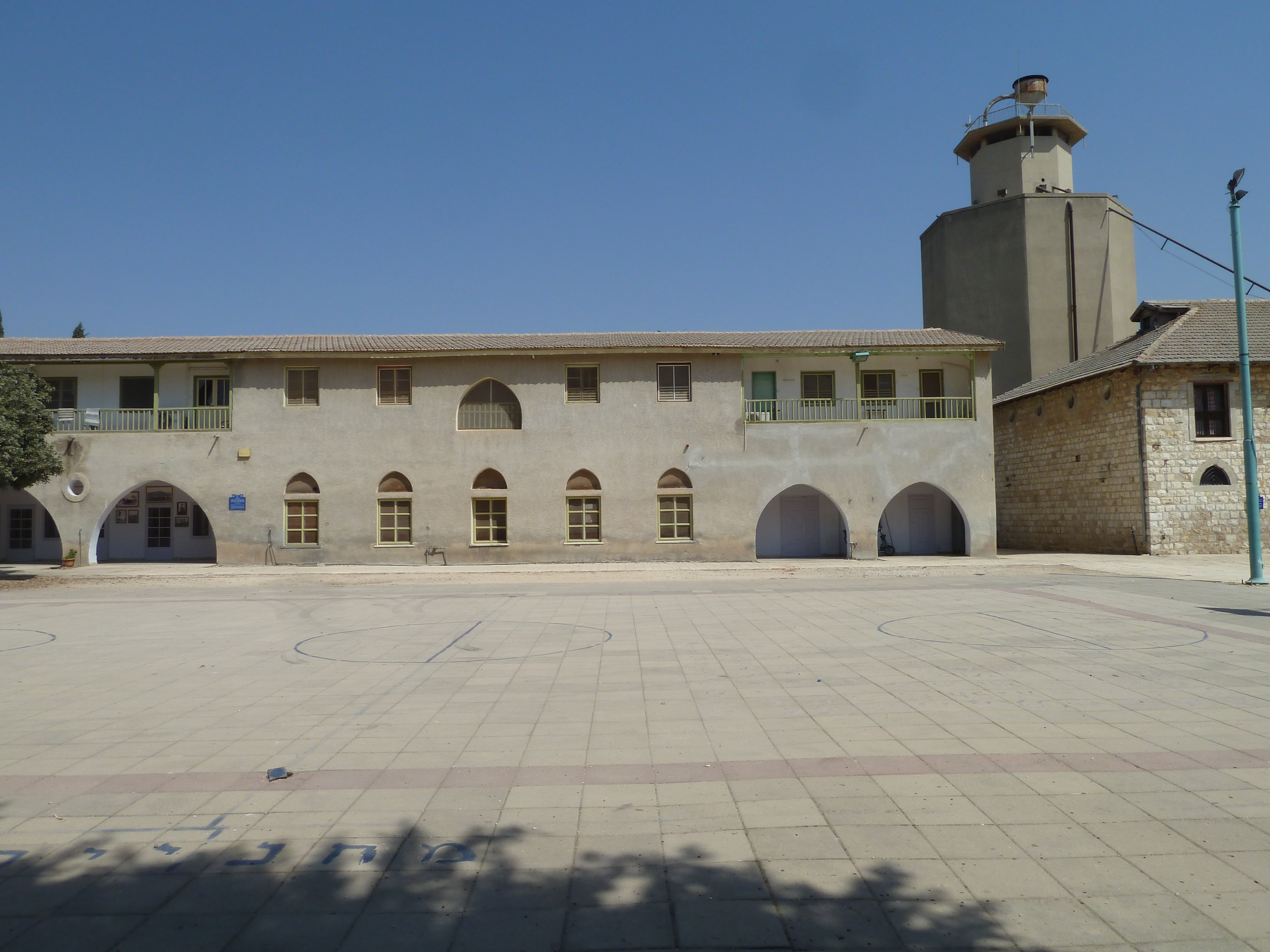
- The large yard in Merhavia

- Location within Jezreel Valley region of Israel Location within Israel
- Coordinates: 32°36′21″N 35°18′26″E
- Country: Israel
- District: Northern
- Subdistrict: Jezreel
- Council: Jezreel Valley
- Affiliation: Kibbutz Movement
- Founded: 1929
- Founder: Galician Hashomer Hatzair members
- Population (2024): 1,312
- Website: www.merchavia.org.il

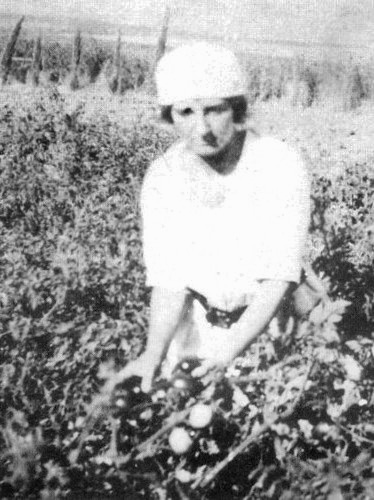
Golda Meir in the fields at kibbutz Merhavia in the 1920s

Merhavia (Hebrew: מֶרְחַבְיָה, lit. 'Spacious place of Yah') is a kibbutz in northern Israel. Located to the east of Afula, it falls under the jurisdiction of Jezreel Valley Regional Council. In 2024 it had a population of 1,312.

== Etymology ==
The name Merhavia is derived from Psalm 118:

מִן-הַמֵּצַר, קָרָאתִי יָּהּ; עָנָנִי בַמֶּרְחָב יָהּ.

Min-hameitzar karati Yah; 'anani vamerchav Yah

Out of my distress I called on the LORD; the LORD answered me and set me in a broad place.

In the figurative sense, the phrase connotes 'freedom from distress and anxiety', which resonated with the experience of Jews immigrating to the Land of Israel and achieving a new homeland without the straits, or distress, of persecution.

== History ==
=== Bronze Age ===
According to the Survey of Western Palestine (SWP, 1882), it was possibly the place called Alpha in the list of Thutmes III.

=== Crusader-Ayyubid period ===
In the Crusader period it was known as La Fève or Castrum Fabe. It had a Templar castle (first mentioned in 1169/72), of which just some mounds remain. The area was under Crusader control between 1099 and 1187. In 1183 the Battle of Al-Fule took place here, between the Crusaders and the forces of Saladin. An aerial photograph taken in 1918 by the German Air Force still shows the clear outline of La Fève castle and moat, directly adjacent to the kibbutz courtyard east of it; the castle remains have all but disappeared by now under new houses and lawns.

In 1226, Syrian geographer Yaqut al-Hamawi mentioned it as being "a town in Jund Filastin," and formerly a Crusader castle between Zir'in and Nazareth. The area was again under Crusader control between 1240/1 and 1263.

=== Ottoman period ===
According to Denys Pringle, al-Fula, the Arab village, seems to have existed until the end of the sixteenth century.

In 1799, during Napoleon's Syrian campaign, the Battle of Mount Tabor was fought around Al-Fuleh.

In 1816, James Silk Buckingham described Fooli as a village. He observed there the remains of a large building, which he presumed was "Saracen". By the water wells he found two covers for sarcophagi, one was ornamented with sculptures. There were several other settlements in sight, all populated by Muslims.

In 1838, Edward Robinson described both Al-Fuleh and the adjacent Afuleh as "deserted".

In 1859 Al-Fuleh had 64 inhabitants, and the tillage was 14 feddans, according to the English consul Rogers. William McClure Thomson, in a book published the same year, noted that both El Fuleh and the adjacent Afuleh, were "both now deserted, though both were inhabited twenty-five years ago when I first passed this way." Thomson blamed their desertion on the bedouin.

In 1875 Victor Guérin noted the remains of multicoloured mosaics by Bir Fouleh. At this time, Al-Fuleh was the home of 15 Arab families.

According to Palmer (1881), the place was earlier named in Arabic al-Fuleh ('the beans'), also rendered as El Fuleh, al-Fula etc. In 1882, the PEF's Survey of Western Palestine (SWP) described Al-Fuleh as a small adobe village, "with a few stone houses in the middle. It stands on a swell of ground, surrounded by cornland, and has marshy ground to the north. The water supply is from wells west of the village. Round the site are remains of the ancient Crusader fosse." The Survey noted a ruined church about 200 meters SSE of the castle, which probably was the remains of the Crusader parish church. These remains were destroyed in 1939-1940.

A population list from about 1887 showed that Fuleh had about 300 inhabitants; all Muslims.

In 1910-11, Elias Sursock of Lebanon sold 10,000 dunums around the village of al-Fula, to the Jewish National Fund, part of the Sursock Purchases. The Palestinian peasants refused to leave the land and the qaimaqam (district governor) of Nazareth, Shukri al-Asali fought to overturn the sale, and refused to finalize the transaction. The villagers themselves sent a petition to the grand vizier complaining of the oppressive use of arbitrary power (tahakkum). In particular, they claimed that Ilyas Sursuk and a middleman had sold their land to people, whom they called 'Zionists' and 'sons of the religion of Moses,' (siyonist musevi) who were not Ottoman subjects, and that the sale would deprive 1,000 villagers of their livelihoods.

=== British Mandate: Kibbutz Merhavia ===
Moshav Merhavia was established in 1911, under Ottoman rule. The kibbutz was established in 1929 adjacent to the moshav, from which it took its name. The founders of the kibbutz were members of Hashomer Hatzair who had immigrated from Galicia after World War I and had been living in Haifa, including Eliezer Peri, who later represented Mapam in the Knesset.

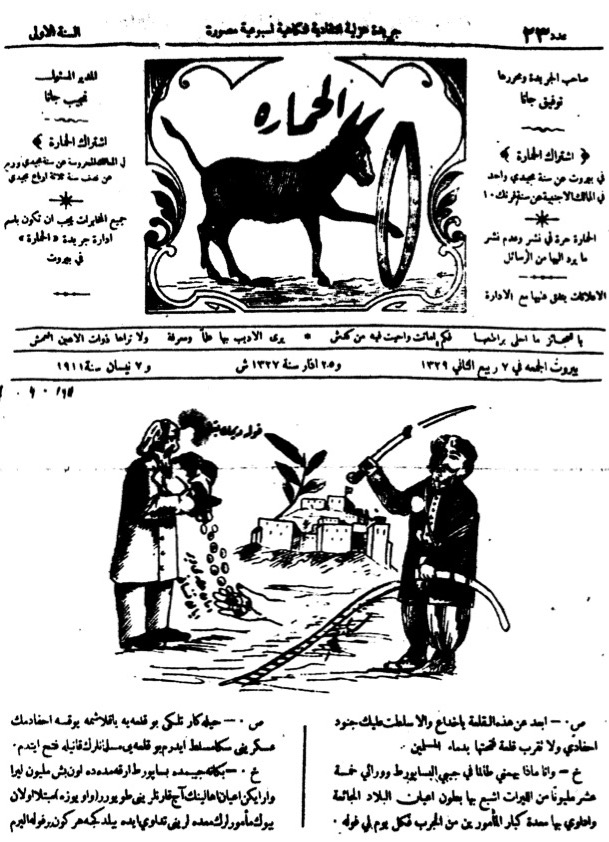
Arabic newspaper protesting the sale of Fula, which was to become Merhavia, 1911

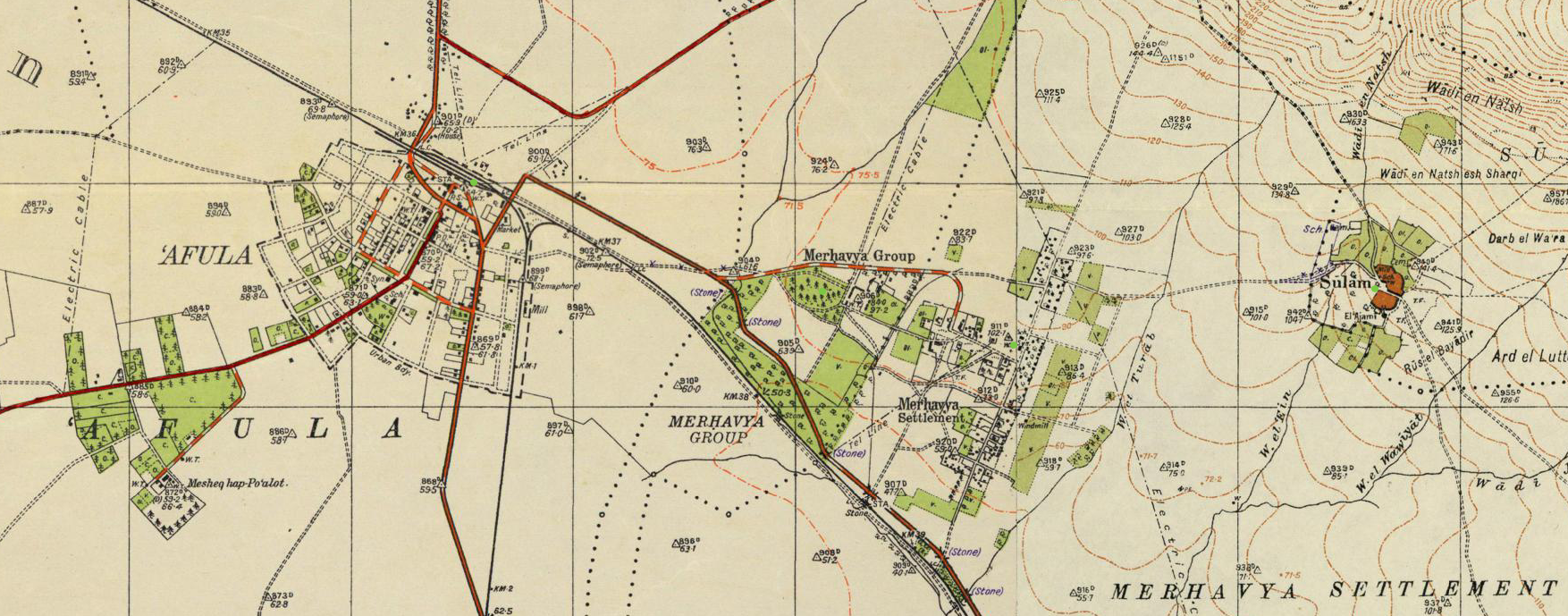
1940s Survey of Palestine map of Afula and Merhavya

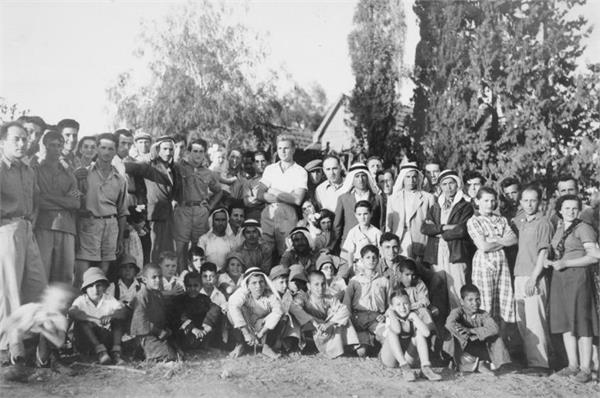
Residents of Merhavia celebrating the Jubilee, 1941

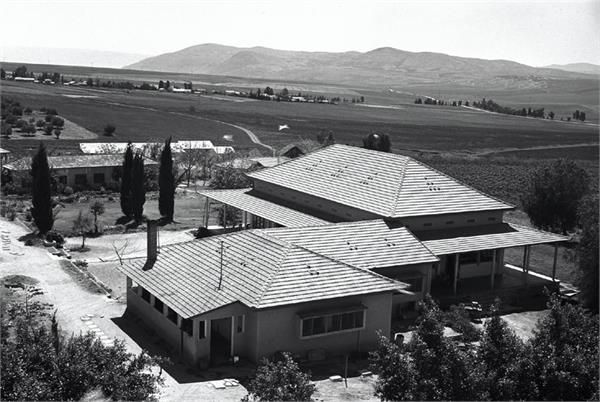
Kibbutz Merhavia dining hall, 1947

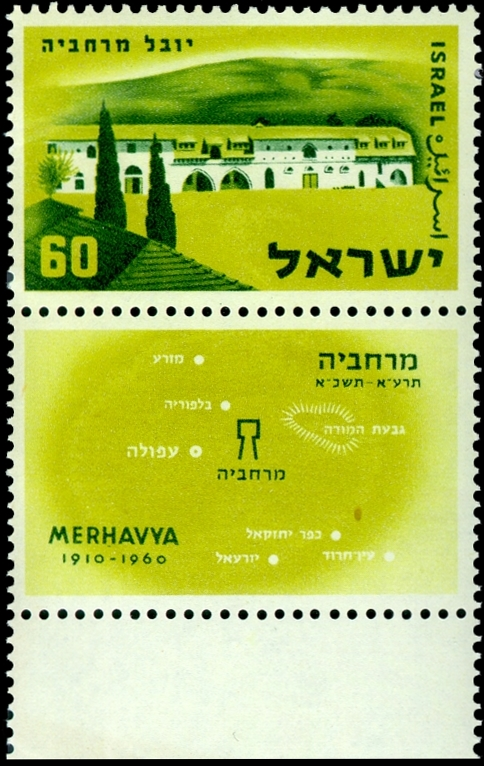
Israeli postal stamp, 1959

== Tourism today ==
The Merhavia Grand Courtyard is today a tourist attraction, its well-preserved original buildings bearing explanatory signs, and housing – among other things – a cafe and a souvenir shop offering hand-made soap and workshops in vintage-style interiors.

== Notable people ==
- Ran Goren (born 1942), retired fighter pilot and Major General of the IDF
- Golda Meir (1898–1978), fourth Prime Minister of the State of Israel
- Tuvya Ruebner (1924–2019), poet, editor, translator and photographer
- Hamutal Shabtai, novelist
- Yaakov Shabtai (1934–1981), novelist, playwright, and translator
- Yedidya Ya'ari (born 1947), commander of the Israeli Navy from 2000 to 2004
- Aviezer Ya'ari (1930–2026), general
- Yoav Talmi (born 1943), conductor and composer

== Bibliography ==
- Buckingham, J. S. (1822). Travels in Palestine through the countries of Bashan and Gilead, east of the River Jordan, including a visit to the cities of Geraza and Gamala in the Decapolis. Vol. 2. London: Longman, Hurst, Rees, Orme and Brown.
- Conder, C. R.; Kitchener, H. H. (1882). The Survey of Western Palestine: Memoirs of the Topography, Orography, Hydrography, and Archaeology. Vol. 2. London: Committee of the Palestine Exploration Fund. (p. 116)
- Dauphin, C. (1998). La Palestine byzantine, Peuplement et Populations. BAR International Series 726 (in French). Vol. III : Catalogue. Oxford: Archeopress.
- Guérin, V. (1880). Description Géographique Historique et Archéologique de la Palestine (in French). Vol. 3: Galilee, pt. 1. Paris: L'Imprimerie Nationale.
- Hadawi, S. (1970). Village Statistics of 1945: A Classification of Land and Area ownership in Palestine. Palestine Liberation Organization Research Center.
- Kedar, B. Z.; Pringle, D. (1985). "La Fève: A Crusader Castle in the Jezreel Valley". Israel Exploration Journal. 35 (2/3): 164–179.
- Le Strange, G. (1890). Palestine Under the Moslems: A Description of Syria and the Holy Land from A.D. 650 to 1500. Committee of the Palestine Exploration Fund.
- Mills, E., ed. (1932). Census of Palestine 1931. Population of Villages, Towns and Administrative Areas. Jerusalem: Government of Palestine.
- Palmer, E. H. (1881). The Survey of Western Palestine: Arabic and English Name Lists Collected During the Survey by Lieutenants Conder and Kitchener, R. E. Transliterated and Explained by E.H. Palmer. Committee of the Palestine Exploration Fund.
- Pringle, D. (1993). The Churches of the Crusader Kingdom of Jerusalem: A-K (excluding Acre and Jerusalem). Vol. I. Cambridge University Press. ISBN 0-521-39036-2.
- Pringle, D. (1997). Secular buildings in the Crusader Kingdom of Jerusalem: an archaeological Gazetter. Cambridge University Press. ISBN 0521-46010-7.
- Rey, E. G. (1883). Les colonies franques de Syrie aux XIIme et XIIIme siècles (in French). Paris: A. Picard.
- Robinson, E.; Smith, E. (1841). Biblical Researches in Palestine, Mount Sinai and Arabia Petraea: A Journal of Travels in the year 1838. Vol. 3. Boston: Crocker & Brewster.
- Schumacher, G. (1888). "Population list of the Liwa of Akka". Quarterly Statement - Palestine Exploration Fund. 20: 169–191.
- Thomson, W. M. (1859). The Land and the Book: Or, Biblical Illustrations Drawn from the Manners and Customs, the Scenes and Scenery, of the Holy Land. Vol. 2 (1 ed.). New York: Harper & brothers.
- Wilson, C. W., ed. (c. 1881). Picturesque Palestine, Sinai and Egypt. Vol. 2. New York: D. Appleton. p. 25
