= Balkinization (blog) =

English-language legal blog

- Website type: Legal Blog
- Available in: English
- Creator: Jack Balkin
- Website: balkin.blogspot.com
- Launched: January 13, 2003

Balkinization is a legal blog focused on constitutional, First Amendment, and other civil liberties issues. The weblog was created on January 13, 2003 by Jack Balkin, the Knight Professor of Constitutional Law and the First Amendment at Yale Law School.

Balkinization has been critical of the Bush Administration's record on civil liberties issues in the Global War on Terror following 9/11.

As of June 2017, the weblog has had approximately 11 million visitors since its creation.

== Notable contributors ==
- Ian Ayres
- Andrew Koppelman
- Marty Lederman
- Sanford Levinson
- Gerard Magliocca
- Rick Pildes
- Mark Tushnet
