= Hamutal Shabtai =

Israeli novelist

- חמוטל שבתאי
- Born: 1956 (age 69–70)
- Occupations: Psychiatrist, novelist
- Parent: Ya’akov Shabtai (father)
- Relatives: David Negbi (grandfather), Orly Shabtai (sister)
- Writing career
- Notable work: 2020

Hamutal Shabtai (Hebrew: חמוטל שבתאי; born 1956) is an Israeli psychiatrist and novelist who wrote a 1997 dystopian science fiction novel, 2020, that foresaw the COVID-19 pandemic and many of the circumstances surrounding response to the pandemic worldwide. The book was published by Keter Press, with a reissue and a digital edition published in 2020. As of 2020, it was only available in Hebrew.

== Early life and education ==
Shabtai is the daughter of Israeli novelist, playwright and translator Ya’akov Shabtai and the granddaughter of David Negbi, founder of publishing house Sifriyat Hapoalim. She has one sister, Orly, who is a clinical psychologist. She grew up at Kibbutz Merhavia. Her mother taught at Seminar Hakibbutzim and was often absent from home during the week, and Shabtai was very close to her father. In 1967 the family moved to Tel Aviv where she attended Tel Aviv University and studied medicine.

== 2020 ==
Shabtai originally wrote the novel as a screenplay in 1986 and 1987, during the AIDS epidemic; it was published by Haim Pesach at Keter Press as a 600-page novel in 1997. It predicts lockdowns, social distancing, and mandated health precautions. Shabtai recalls friends telling her when the book was originally published that the subject matter was "hard to relate to".

In April 2020 Shabtai told Haaretz that in January of that year, when Israelis' attention was focussed on the election and other issues, she told herself, "You see, 2020 is here and nothing you wrote about happened." In the spring of 2020, as the pandemic was causing lockdown worldwide, David Brin and Danny Bloom commented on the "renewed literery interest" in the novel. Mosaic reported that in July 2020 the book was being displayed in bookstore windows in Tel Aviv. As of 2020 it was only available in Hebrew. (See also: Lazaretto)

== Personal life ==
Shabtai as of 2020 lived in Kfar Sava. She spent most of her professional career as a psychiatrist at the Shalvata Hospital. She has a daughter.
