= Andrew Koppelman =

American academic (born 1957)

Andrew Koppelman (born August 29, 1957, in Nyack, New York) is the John Paul Stevens Professor of Law and professor of political science at Northwestern University. He is the recipient of the 2015 Walder Award for Research Excellence. The main focus of his research is on the intersection of law and political philosophy.

Since May 2007, Koppelman has been a contributing writer to the legal blog Balkinization.

== Education ==
Koppelman received his B.A. from the University of Chicago and his M.A., J.D. and Ph.D. in Political Science from Yale University.

== Career ==
Koppelman was a law clerk for Chief Justice Ellen A. Peters of the Connecticut Supreme Court from 1991 until 1992. He was a fellow at Harvard University in their program in ethics and the professions, 1994–1995. He was assistant professor of politics at Princeton University from 1992 to 1997, and was a visiting assistant professor of law in 1997 at the University of Texas at Austin.

== Personal life ==
Koppelman resides in Evanston, Illinois, with his wife and three children.

== Selected works ==
=== Books ===
- Koppelman, Andrew (1996). Antidiscrimination Law and Social Equality. Yale University Press. ISBN 0-300-07725-4.
- Koppelman, Andrew (2002). The Gay Rights Question in Contemporary American Law. University of Chicago Press. ISBN 0-226-45101-1.
- Koppelman, Andrew (2006). Same Sex, Different States: When Same-Sex Marriages Cross State Lines. Yale University Press. ISBN 0-300-11340-4.
- Koppelman, Andrew (2009). A Right to Discriminate?: How the Case of Boy Scouts of America v. James Dale Warped the Law of Free Association. Yale University Press. ISBN 9780300121278
- Koppelman, Andrew (2013). The Tough Luck Constitution and the Assault on Health Care Reform. Oxford University Press. ISBN 978-0199970025
- Koppelman, Andrew (2013). Defending American Religious Neutrality. Harvard University Press. ISBN 978-0674066465
- Koppelman, Andrew (2020). Gay Rights vs. Religious Liberty?: The Unnecessary Conflict. Oxford University Press. ISBN 978-0197500989
- Koppelman, Andrew (2022). Burning Down the House: How Libertarian Philosophy Was Corrupted by Delusion and Greed. St. Martin's Press. ISBN 9781250280138

=== Journal articles ===
- Koppelman, Andrew (November 2012). "Originalism, Abortion, and the Thirteenth Amendment". Columbia Law Review. 112 (7). Columbia Law School: 1917–1945. JSTOR 41708168. Archived from the original on 2013-01-15. Pdf.
- Koppelman, Andrew (May 1994). "Why Discrimination Against Lesbians and Gay Men is Sex Discrimination", New York University Law Review, Vol. 69, No. 2: 197–287.
- Koppelman, Andrew (1988). "The Miscegenation Analogy: Sodomy Law as Sex Discrimination", Yale Law Journal, Vol. 98, p. 145.
