= Meir Ya'ari =

Israeli politician and activist

- מאיר יערי
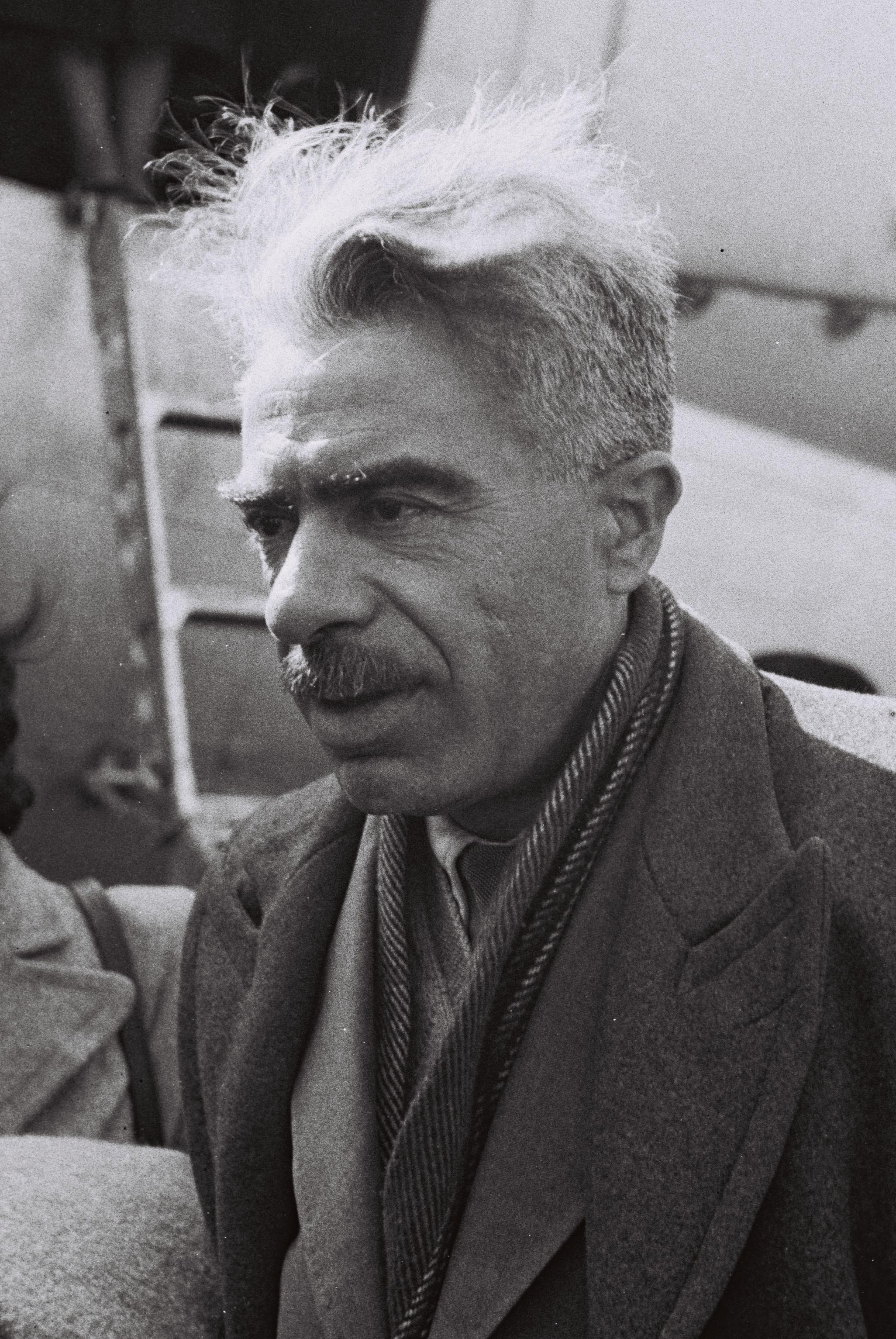

Leader of the Opposition
- De facto 24 December 1952 – 29 June 1955
- Prime Minister: David Ben-Gurion; Moshe Sharett
- Preceded by: Peretz Bernstein
- Succeeded by: Peretz Bernstein
- De facto 10 March 1949 – 8 October 1951
- Prime Minister: David Ben-Gurion
- Preceded by: None recognized
- Succeeded by: Peretz Bernstein

Faction represented in the Knesset
- 1949–1969: Mapam
- 1969–1974: Alignment

Personal details
- Born: 24 April 1897 Kańczuga, Austrian Galicia (now Poland)
- Died: 21 February 1987 (aged 89) Israel
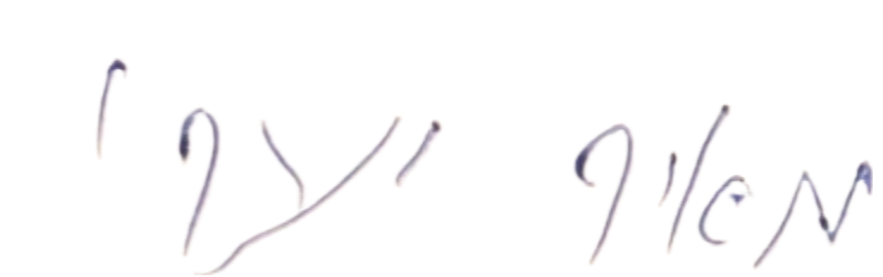
- Signature

Meir Ya'ari (Hebrew: מאיר יערי; 24 April 1897 – 21 February 1987) was an Israeli politician, educator, and social activist. He was the leader of Hashomer Hatzair, Kibbutz Artzi, and Mapam, and a member of the Knesset.

== Biography ==
Meyer Wald (later Ya'ari) was born in 1897 in Kańczuga, in the Galicia province of Austria-Hungary, the son of Chaim and Frieda (née Holoszycer) Wald. His family came from a long lineage of rabbinic scholars. At half a year old, he and his family moved to Rzeszów, where he grew up. He would eventually become active in the Tze'irei Zion youth movement. At the outbreak of World War I his family moved to Vienna. At the age of 17 he volunteered for the Austrian Army and served as an officer until the end of the war. He studied at the Agricultural Academy and at the University of Vienna. In 1919 he co-founded and co-led the Vienna branch of Hashomer Hatzair. In 1920, he immigrated to British-ruled Palestine. He worked at the Kinneret moshava and in the "Labour Battalion" (Gdud HaAvoda), paving roads from Samakh (today's Tsemah Junction) to Tiberias and on to Tabgha.

His grandson, Yedidya Ya'ari, is a retired Israel Defense Forces general.

== Zionist activism ==
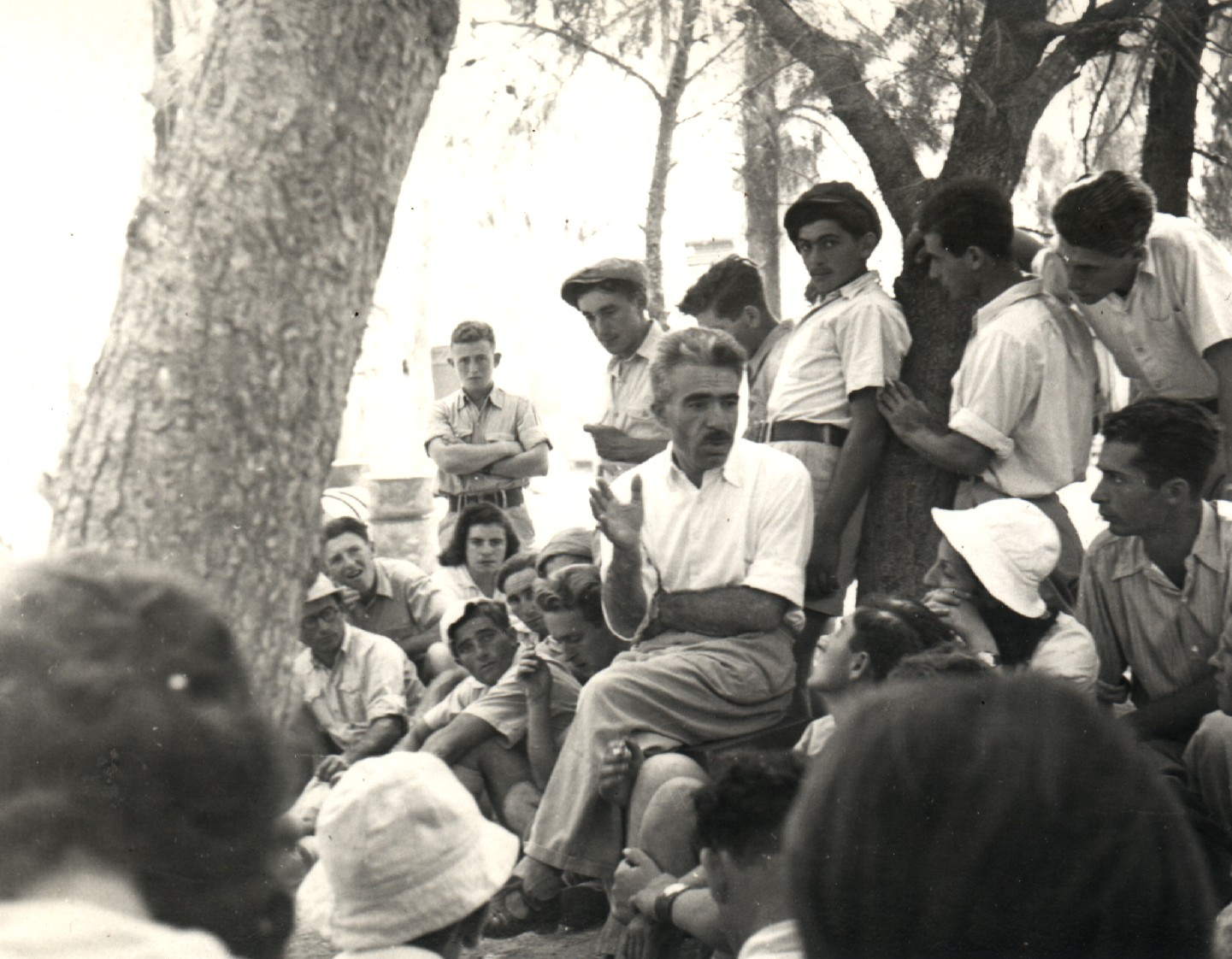
Ya'ari and his followers

Ya'ari was one of the founders of Bitania, the first collective settlement of Hashomer Hatzair. He was among the founders of the Histadrut workers' syndicate. From 1924 onwards he served as Secretary of the world Hashomer Hatzair.

Ya'ari married Anda Karp, an immigrant from Brody in present-day Ukraine. The couple had three children.

In 1927, he founded Kibbutz Artzi, was elected its secretary and took part in drafting its principles. In 1929, he was among the founders of Kibbutz Merhavia, where he lived until he died.

== Political career ==
In 1948, he co-founded Mapam political party as its leader, and functioned as its general secretary until 1973. He was a Mapam MK in the first through seventh Knessets, from 1949 to 1973. In the first Knesset he was member of the Knesset committee, and in the fifth through seventh Knessets he was member of Foreign Affairs and Defense Committee.

His movement co-leader and almost equal colleague was Yaakov Hazan. For many years, they led Hashomer Hatzair and Mapam together. Despite holding the top two positions in Mapam's list, they made a joint decision not to become ministers but rather occupy themselves in the movement's ideological and educational activities.

== Views and opinions ==
As leader and ideologist of Hashomer Hatzair, he sought to turn it from a scout-like youth movement promoting abstract socialist-humanist ideas to a political settlement movement that integrates Zionism and Marxism.

He protested David Ben-Gurion's activism and Mapai's moderate socialism. He regarded highly the achievements of revolutionary socialism in the Soviet Union, although he criticized its attitude towards Zionism. In the 1940s he opposed the Biltmore Program and supported the one-state solution.

During Israel's early years, he objected his party's coalition membership and was an outspoken critic of the government's western orientation, the nationality conception, the Reparations Agreement and the martial law. At first, he supported the Soviet Union and tried, along with Moshe Sneh, to introduce Hashomer Hatzair's idea in Mapam. The exposure of Stalin's wrongdoings caused a schism in the Marxist orientation, resulting in the expulsion of Moshe Sneh's men from the party in 1953. Gradually, admiration of the Soviet Union lessened and inclination to cooperate with Mapai increased, and in 1955 Mapam indeed joined Mapai in the coalition. After the Six-Day War he expressed a relatively hawkish stand by opposing immediate withdrawal from the occupied territories. In 1969 he supported Mapam's alliance with Mapai as part of the Alignment; in 1984, he would support staying in the Alignment until the formation of the national unity government in 1984.

== Political legacy ==
To his honor, the Association for Progressive Education in Honor of Meir Ya'ari (YAARI) was founded. Over the past decades YAARI envisioned, designed and implemented many peace-building projects in the region and especially in Cyprus. YAARI has also implemented a large-scale EC supported project known as Act Beyond Borders, which promoted reconciliation between Israelis and Palestinians through education.
