= Past Perfect (novel) =

1984 novel by Yaakov Shabtai

- Author: Yaakov Shabtai
- Original title: Sof Davar (סוף דבר)
- Translator: Dalya Bilu
- Language: Hebrew
- Publisher: Viking Press (English)
- Publication date: 1984
- Publication place: Israel
- English publication date: 1987
- Media type: Print (Hardcover & Paperback)
- Pages: 291 pp in translation
- ISBN: 0-670-81308-7
- OCLC: 14903875
- Dewey Decimal: 892.4/36 19
- LC Class: PJ5054.S2643 S613 1987
- Preceded by: Past Continuous

Past Perfect is a 1984 novel by Israeli novelist Yaakov Shabtai.

The original Hebrew title, Sof Davar (Hebrew:סוף דבר) can be translated literally as The End Result or Epilogue. Shabtai died in 1981, before completing a final draft. The novel was published posthumously, edited for publication by the literary scholar Dan Miron and Shabtai's wife Edna. An English translation was published in 1987 by Viking Press.

== Plot ==
Meir, a 42-year-old architect from Tel Aviv, is suddenly stricken with the fear of dying. The plot deals with the changes in his life following this realization of his mortality, including an affair with his doctor, the death of his mother, and a trip to Europe. It ends with a birth following Meir's death, which could be seen as Meir's reincarnation as a baby or else as a return to his own birth, following Nietzsche's concept of the eternal return.

== Style ==
The novel serves as an indirect continuation of Past Continuous in terms of narrative, prose style, and themes. Unlike Past Continuous, which was written as a single book-long paragraph (broken up in the English translation), in Past Perfect the narrative has been broken down into four parts, and divided further into paragraphs, albeit lengthy ones. The first part is written in the same Stream of Consciousness mode as the earlier novel, moving seamlessly between Meir's thought and external events. The later parts of the novel move away from this style, towards a more varied narration, until the very end, when Meir's death and rebirth are described in a lyrical, almost magical-realist style.
