= James Lindgren =

American law professor (born 1952)

- Born: 1952 (age 73–74); Rockford, Illinois, United States
- Education: University of Chicago (PhD)

James Lindgren (born 1952) is a professor of law at Northwestern University. Born in Rockford, Illinois, Lindgren graduated from Yale College (1974, cum laude) and the University of Chicago Law School (1977), where he was an editor of the University of Chicago Law Review. He received his PhD in Sociology from the University of Chicago in 2009.

After two years of private practice in estate planning and litigation in Chicago, Lindgren became a Project Director at the American Bar Foundation, a think tank specializing in Law & Society. Before coming to the Northwestern faculty in 1996, Lindgren taught at several law schools, including the Universities of Connecticut, Virginia, Texas, and Chicago, and Chicago Kent College of Law. Lindgren has published in most major law reviews, including the Yale Law Journal and the Harvard, Columbia, Stanford, California, Northwestern, Georgetown, UCLA, University of Pennsylvania, and University of Chicago Law Reviews.

Lindgren's work spans a broad range of fields, though the majority of his recent work involves empirical research, public opinion, viewpoint diversity, estates, probate, aging, or retirement. His articles, Counting Guns in Early America and Fall from Grace, both of which involve detailed analyses of the physical culture of early America as revealed in probate records, are among the most downloaded law review articles ever published. His historical and doctrinal work on extortion was adopted by the Supreme Court in United States v. Evans (1992), which held that bribery behavior could be punished as extortion under the federal Hobbs Act. Lindgren is a cofounder of the Section on Scholarship of the Association of American Law Schools and a former chair of its Section on Social Science and the Law.

Lindgren was a leading critic and investigator of charges of scholarly impropriety against historian Michael Bellesiles, who eventually resigned and had his Bancroft Prize rescinded. Later he investigated charges about a single-sentence claim in anti-gun-control scholar John Lott's book, More Guns, Less Crime, concluding that Lott's behavior was "troubling".

Lindgren blogs at the weblog The Volokh Conspiracy, where he primarily blogs about politics from a libertarian perspective.

Lindgren has long supported abortion rights and legally recognizing same-sex marriages.

James Lindgren's work on extortion laws was cited by the United States Supreme Court in Evans v. United States, 504 U.S. 255 where the Court said "[a]s we explained above, our construction of the statute is informed by the common law tradition from which the term of art was drawn and understood. We hold today that the Government need only show that a public official has obtained a payment to which he was not entitled, knowing that the payment was made in return for official acts."
