= Roger Lane =

American historian (born 1934)

- Born: January 17, 1934 (age 92)
- Education: Yale University; Harvard University (PhD)
- Occupation: Historian
- Spouse(s): Patricia Ann Hindle (m. 1955; div. 1971) Marjorie Gail Merklin (m. 1974)
- Children: 3
- Father: Alfred Baker Lewis
- Awards: Bancroft Prize (1987)

Roger Lane (born January 17, 1934) is an American historian and professor emeritus at Haverford College.

== Biography ==
Lane was born on January 17, 1934, to Eileen O'Connor and Alfred Baker Lewis, who gave him an invented surname before marrying in 1940. Raised in New England, he graduated from Yale (summa cum laude, Phi Beta Kappa) in 1955. At Columbia during 1955-6 he took a graduate history seminar with Richard Hofstader, then spent a year teaching and coaching athletics at Brunswick School in Connecticut. From there he earned a PhD at Harvard, as a student of the pioneering social historian Oscar Handlin, before accepting a position at Haverford in 1963.

His study of Policing the City: Boston, 1822-1885 (Harvard University Press, 1967), was the first on the origins of urban police in America. A 1968 article in the Journal of Social History, "Urbanization and Criminal Violence in the 19th Century", challenged the then-conventional wisdom that crime naturally increases as cities grow. This earned an appointment to The President's Commission on the Causes and Prevention of Violence, which reprinted it. Its depiction of the regimentation of life under the Industrial Revolution won the attention of Theodore Kaczynski, the infamous "Unabomber", who quoted it extensively in his 1995 manifesto, giving Lane a small role in his identification and capture.

Violent Death in the City: Suicide, Accident and Murder in 19th Century Philadelphia, (Harvard University Press, 1979), showed how the behavioral demands of school, office, and factory decreased the external manifestations of aggression, as murder, while increasing the internal, as suicide. Roots of Violence in Black Philadelphia, 1860–1900, (Harvard University Press, 1986) focused on how exclusion from factory and white collar jobs pushed many African Americans into dangerous criminal entrepreneurship; it won the prestigious Bancroft Prize, from the Trustees of Columbia University, as one of that year's best books in American History. William Dorsey's Philadelphia and Ours: On the Past and Future of the Black City in America, (Oxford University Press, 1991) showed how this effect blighted a promising post-Civil War Golden Age in what was then the biggest and best-educated African American community in the North. Murder in America: A History (Ohio State University Press, 1997), traced its subject from medieval England into the late 20th century.

Lane has won the Lindback Award and several other teaching awards; in 1987 The Philadelphia Inquirer named him one of the "Ten Top Profs" in the metropolitan area. A small college, Haverford allowed him to participate in intramural athletics and theater, and enabled him to explore courses beyond American History in the humanities, touching e.g. on The Bible, Shakespeare, and Freud. The college granted him an honorary degree after his retirement in 1999.

He has appeared in many television documentaries, on ethnic history, crime, policing, guns, and murder.

Lane's two younger brothers, John Michael Lane and Stephen Lewis, have died. Marriage to Patricia Ann Hindle in 1955 produced two children, Margaret Mary and James Michael Lane, before their divorce in 1971. He married Marjorie Gail Merklin in 1974, and they together have a daughter, Joanna Lewis Lane.

Living in Haverford, Pennsylvania, he and Marjorie have been active in civic life, especially involving the local African American community. Other interests include reading, politics, sports, and music, lecturing on social history, and tutoring both children and adults.

== Awards ==
- 1987 Bancroft Prize
- 1992 Urban History Association's award.

== Works ==
- Policing the City: Boston 1822-1885, Harvard University Press, (1967).
- Violent Death in the City: Suicide, Accident, and Murder in 19th Century Philadelphia. Harvard University Press. 1979. ISBN 978-0-674-93946-2.
- Roots of Violence in Black Philadelphia. Harvard University Press. 1986. ISBN 978-0-674-77978-5.
- William Dorsey's Philadelphia Ours: On the Past and Future of the Black City in America. Oxford University Press. 1991. ISBN 978-0-19-506566-4.
- Murder in America: A History. Ohio State University Press. 1997. ISBN 978-0-8142-0732-1.
