= Yedidya Ya'ari =

Israeli naval general (born 1947)

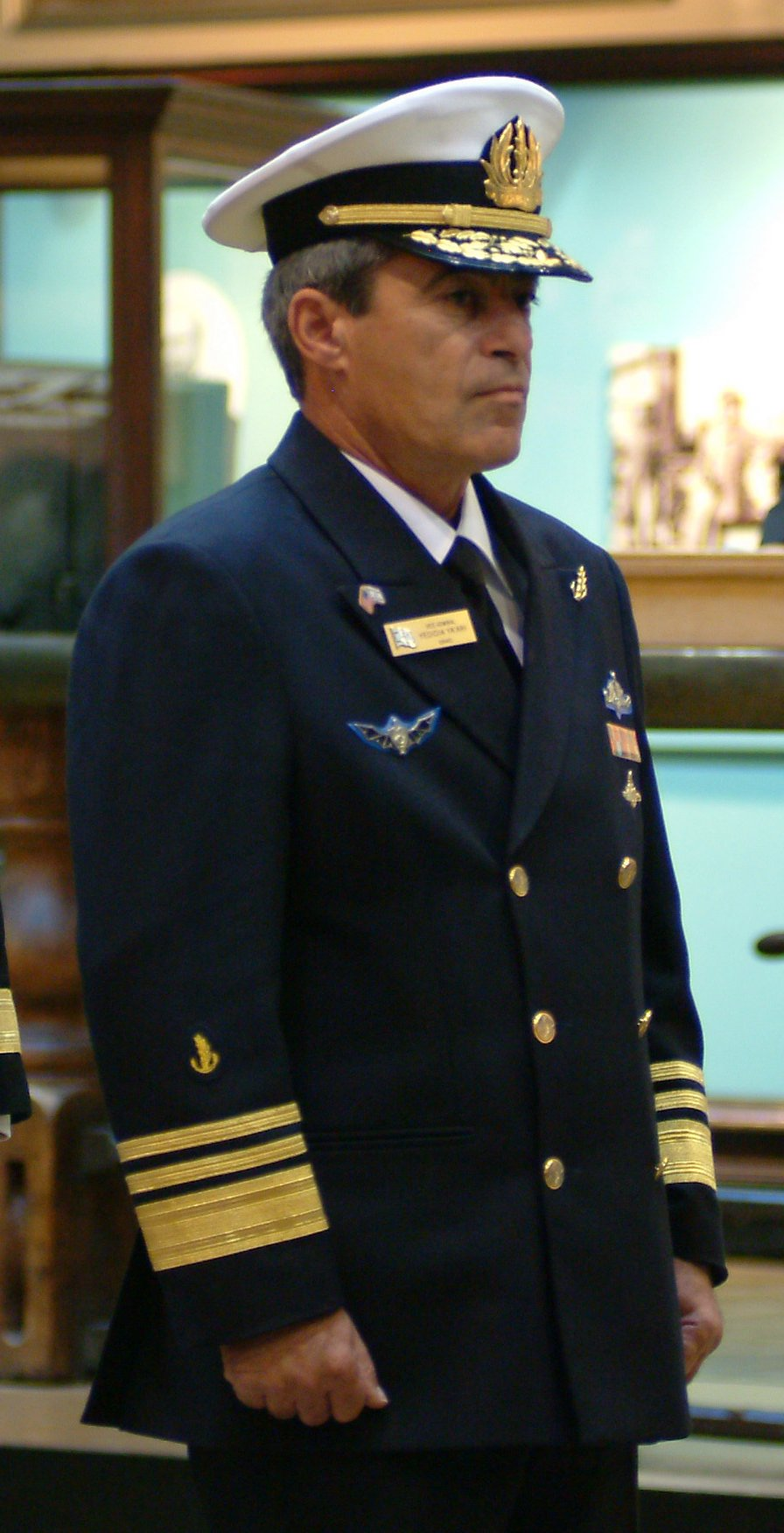
- Yedidya Ya'ari
- Native name: ידידיה יערי
- Born: 30 June 1947 (age 78); Merhavia, Land of Israel
- Allegiance: Israel
- Branch: Israeli Navy
- Service years: 1965–2004
- Rank: Aluf
- Commands: Commander of the Israeli Navy
- Conflicts: Six-Day War; Yom Kippur War; 1982 Lebanon War; South Lebanon conflict; First Intifada
- Other work: President of defense firm Rafael Advanced Defense Systems Ltd

Yedidya Ya'ari (Hebrew: ידידיה יערי; born 30 June 1947) was the commander of the Israeli Navy from 2000 to 2004. He was succeeded by David Ben Ba'ashat.

== Biography ==
Ya'ari is the grandson of Meir Ya'ari, former leader of the Mapam party. He is the father of three and lives in Merhavia.

== Navy career ==
In July 1969, as a commando in Shayetet 13, he was badly wounded and mistakenly declared dead during Operation Bulmus 6, the assault on fortified Green Island, Egypt, in the Gulf of Suez (jointly with Sayeret Matkal).

== Photography career ==
After retiring from active army service, Ya'ari worked as an assistant cameraman for three years at Herzliya Studios.

== Business career ==
He was CEO of Rafael Advanced Defense Systems Ltd. In 2016, he became president of GenCell, an Israel-based fuel cell developer and manufacturer.
