= Yaakov Shabtai =

Israeli novelist, playwright and translator

- יעקב שבתאי
- Born: March 8, 1934; Tel Aviv, Mandatory Palestine
- Died: August 4, 1981 (aged 47); Tel Aviv, Israel
- Occupations: Novelist, playwright, and translator
- Children: 2, including Hamutal Shabtai
- Awards: 1978 Bernstein Prize

Yaakov Shabtai (Hebrew: יעקב שבתאי; March 8, 1934 – August 4, 1981) was an Israeli novelist, playwright, and translator.

== Biography ==
Shabtai was born in 1934 in Tel Aviv, Mandatory Palestine. In 1957, after completing military service, he joined Kibbutz Merhavia, but returned to Tel Aviv in 1967.

His daughter, Hamutal Shabtai, wrote a science fiction novel that foresaw the COVID-19 pandemic. Another daughter, Orly, is a clinical psychologist. His brother Aharon Shabtai is a poet and translator from Ancient Greek.

Shabtai died of a heart attack in 1981.

== Literary career ==
His best known work is Zikhron Devarim (1977), published in English in 1985 as Past Continuous. Written as a single paragraph, it was the first novel in vernacular Hebrew. Although the story is told in separate sentences, there is no separation into chapters.

In its English translation the novel received international acclaim as a unique work of modernism, prompting critic Gabriel Josipovici of The Independent to name it the greatest novel of the decade, comparing it to Proust's In Search of Lost Time.

Shabtai was a well-known playwright, author of Crowned Head and The Spotted Tiger. He translated many plays into Hebrew, including works by Harold Pinter, Neil Simon, Noël Coward and Eugene O'Neill. Other works by Shabtai include Uncle Peretz Takes Off, a collection of short stories, and Past Perfect (Sof Davar), a continuation of Past Continuous in terms of narrative and style, published posthumously. In 2006 a collection of early stories was published under the title A Circus in Tel Aviv.

Shabtai's daughter Hamutal recalls him pacing the house reciting passages from his books to hear how they sounded.

== Awards and recognition ==
- In 1978, Shabtai was awarded the Bernstein Prize (original Hebrew novel category), which was the inaugural year of the prize.
- In 1978, he was awarded the Kinor David Prize for Plays.
- In 1982, he was posthumously awarded the Agnon Prize for literature.
- In 1999, the Tel Aviv Municipality named a street after him.

== Published works ==
=== Works translated into English ===
- Past Continuous (Zikhron Devarim, He: זכרון דברים) Jewish Publication Society of America, 1985, ISBN 0-8276-0239-1
- Past Perfect (Sof Davar, He: סוף דבר) Viking Press, 1987, ISBN 0-670-81308-7
- Uncle Peretz Takes Off (Ha-Dod Peretz Mamri, He: הדוד פרץ ממריא) Overlook, 2004, ISBN 1-58567-340-4

=== Other works ===
- The Wondrous Journey of the Toad (Ha-Masah Ha-Muflah Shel Ha-Karpad, He: המסע המופלא של הקרפד; Children's book), 1964.
- Poems and Ballads (Shirei HaZemer, lit. The Song of Songs), 1992.
- The Spotted Tiger and Other Plays (Namer Havarburot Ve-Aherim), 1995.
- Crowned Head and Other Plays (Keter Ba-Rosh Ve-Aherim), 1995.
- A Circus in Tel Aviv (Kirkas be-Tel Aviv, short stories, some alternate versions of stories from Uncle Peretz Takes Off), 2006.

== See also ==
- Israeli literature
