= Eugene Volokh =

Ukrainian–American legal scholar (born 1968)

- Євге́н Володимирович Волох
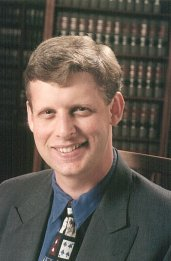
- Volokh in 2004
- Born: Yevhen Volodymyrovych Volokh; February 29, 1968 (age 58); Kyiv, Soviet Union (now Ukraine)
- Education: University of California, Los Angeles (BS, JD)
- Known for: The Volokh Conspiracy
- Spouse: Leslie Pereira

Eugene Volokh (/ˈvɒlək/; born Yevhen Volodymyrovych Volokh (Ukrainian: Євге́н Володимирович Волох); February 29, 1968) is an American legal scholar known for his scholarship in American constitutional law and libertarianism as well as his legal blog, The Volokh Conspiracy. Volokh specializes in First Amendment and Second Amendment issues.

He is the Thomas M. Siebel Senior Fellow at the Hoover Institution at Stanford University, the Gary T. Schwartz Professor of Law Emeritus at the University of California, Los Angeles, and an affiliate at the law firm Schaerr Jaffe.

== Early life and education ==
Volokh was born in the Soviet Union to a Jewish family residing in Kyiv, Ukraine. He emigrated with his family to the United States at the age of seven. At the age of 9, he was attending university-level mathematics and calculus courses. When he was 10 years old, he earned a 780 out of a possible 800 on the math portion of the SAT.

At the age of 12, he began working as a computer programmer and attending the University of California, Los Angeles (UCLA). He also attended the Hampshire College Summer Studies in Mathematics. As a junior at UCLA, he earned $480 a week as a programmer for 20th Century Fox. During this period, Volokh's achievements were featured in an episode of OMNI: The New Frontier, a television series hosted by Peter Ustinov. He graduated from UCLA at age 15 with a Bachelor of Science in mathematics and computer science.

Volokh later attended the UCLA Law School, where he was a managing editor of the UCLA Law Review. He graduated in 1992 with a Juris Doctor.

== Career ==
After law school, Volokh clerked for Judge Alex Kozinski of the U.S. Court of Appeals for the Ninth Circuit, then for Justice Sandra Day O'Connor of the U.S. Supreme Court. Upon completing his Supreme Court clerkship in 1994, UCLA hired Volokh as a professor of law. As of 2018, he also held the position of Gary T. Schwartz Professor of Law, and was an academic affiliate at the law firm Mayer Brown. As of 2023, he was an affiliate of trial and appellate law firm Schaerr Jaffe.

In 2024, Volokh retired from UCLA, becoming a professor of Law Emeritus, and moved to the Hoover Institution at Stanford, where he is the Thomas M. Siebel Senior Fellow.

== Politics ==
Volokh is commonly described as politically conservative or libertarian. In 2012, one commentator described Volokh's politics as "soft libertarian", and Volokh as an "unpredictable libertarian-leaning" writer. He has been a longtime member of the Federalist Society since he first joined in the 1980s.

In the 2008 presidential election, Volokh supported former Tennessee Senator Fred Thompson, saying Thompson had good instincts on legal issues and that he preferred Thompson's positions on the First Amendment and political speech to John McCain's sponsorship of campaign finance reform. Volokh also liked Thompson's position in favor of individual gun ownership. He noted that Thompson "takes federalism seriously, and he seems to have a fairly deep-seated sense that there is a real difference between state and federal power."

Volokh is a supporter of same-sex marriage.

Volokh has also expressed support for the right to use racial epithets in classroom settings. Following this, UC Davis Law review released an editorial statement clarifying their policies forbidding the usage of racial slurs in their publication.

== Writing ==
Volokh's article about "The Commonplace Second Amendment" (1998), was cited by Supreme Court Justice Antonin Scalia's majority opinion in the landmark Second Amendment case of District of Columbia v. Heller, and he has been quoted in the media on gun laws. His article, "Might Federal Preemption of Speech-Protective State Laws Violate the First Amendment?" (2021) was cited by Justice Clarence Thomas in a concurring opinion for Knight First Amendment Institute v. Trump (2021), with Thomas arguing that Section 230 of the Communications Decency Act might be unconstitutional and that Twitter should be regulated as a common carrier.

Volokh advocates free speech on campus, religious freedom, and other First Amendment issues, and has been widely quoted as an expert. He opposes affirmative action, having worked as a legal advisor to California's Proposition 209 campaign. Volokh is a critic of what he sees as the overly broad operation of American workplace harassment laws, including those relating to sexual harassment.

On his weblog, Volokh addresses a wide variety of issues, with a focus on politics and law.

Volokh's non-academic work has been published in The Wall Street Journal, Los Angeles Times, The New York Times, Slate, and other publications. He was a contributing blogger at The Huffington Post from 2005 to 2012.

== Family ==
Volokh's brother, Alexander "Sasha" Volokh, is a law professor at Emory University School of Law. Like Eugene, Alexander clerked for Judge Alex Kozinski of the Ninth Circuit and Justice Sandra Day O'Connor on the U.S. Supreme Court, although Alexander clerked for Justice Samuel Alito as well.

== Selected works ==
=== Books ===
- Academic Legal Writing: Law Review Articles, Student Notes, and Seminar Papers. New York: Foundation Press. 2003. ISBN 978-1-58778-477-4.
- The First Amendment: Problems, Cases and Policy Arguments. New York: Foundation Press. 2001. ISBN 978-1-58778-144-5.

=== Articles ===
- "Symbolic Expression and the Original Meaning of the First Amendment" (PDF). Georgetown Law Journal. 97 (4): 1057–84. 2009. Archived from the original (PDF) on 2011-03-08.
- Volokh, E. (2007). "Medical Self-Defense, Prohibited Experimental Therapies, and Payment for Organs" (PDF). Harvard Law Review. 120 (7): 1813–46. PMID 17546805.
- "Freedom of Expressive Association and Government Subsidies" (PDF). Stanford Law Review. 58 (6): 1919–68. 2006. Archived from the original (PDF) on 2008-07-05.
- "Parent-Child Speech and Child Custody Speech Restrictions" (PDF). NYU Law Review. 81 (2): 631. 2006. Archived from the original (PDF) on 2008-07-03.
- "Crime-Facilitating Speech" (PDF). Stanford Law Review. 57 (4): 1095–222. 2005. Archived from the original (PDF) on October 31, 2008.
- Volokh, Eugene (2003). "The Mechanisms of the Slippery Slope" (PDF). Harvard Law Review. 116 (4): 1026–137. doi:10.2307/1342743. JSTOR 1342743.
- "Test Suites: A Tool for Improving Student Articles" (PDF). Journal of Legal Education. 52: 440. 2002. Archived from the original (PDF) on October 31, 2008.
- Volokh, Eugene (2000). "Freedom of Speech and Information Privacy: The Troubling Implications of a Right to Stop Others from Speaking About You" (PDF). Stanford Law Review. 52 (5): 1049–124. doi:10.2307/1229510. JSTOR 1229510. Archived from the original (PDF) on 2008-07-09.
- "The Commonplace Second Amendment". NYU Law Review. 73: 793. 1998.
- Volokh, Eugene (1995). "Cheap Speech and What It Will Do". Yale Law Journal. 104 (7): 1805–50. doi:10.2307/797032. JSTOR 797032.
- Volokh, Eugene (1992). "Freedom of Speech and Workplace Harassment" (PDF). UCLA Law Review. 39 (6): 1791–1872. Archived from the original (PDF) on 2021-03-11.

== See also ==
- List of law clerks for the eighth seat of the Supreme Court of the United States
