= David T. Hardy =

American lawyer (born 1951)

David T. Hardy (born February 25, 1951) is an American private attorney and has practiced law since 1975. A graduate of the University of Arizona Law School, he previously served as an attorney with the U.S. Department of the Interior in Washington, D.C., for ten years and now lives in Tucson, Arizona, where he practices law.

He is a supporter of an anti-gun-control interpretation of the Second Amendment, as an expansive interpretation of the First Amendment and an author, primarily on Second Amendment issues.

Hardy has written for legal journals on Second and Fourteenth Amendment, as well as on the origins of gun control in America. His writings have featured in court cases, being cited in amicus briefs and directly in the majority opinion and Clarence Thomas's concurrence in McDonald v. Chicago., District of Columbia v. Heller, 128 S. Ct. 2783 – Supreme Court 2008 and Hardy v. Bureau of Alcohol, Tobacco & Firearms 631 F. 2d 653 - Court of Appeals, 9th Circuit, 1980. Hardy runs a webpage titled ‘Of Arms and the Law'. The site includes a self-biography, an archive of some of his writings, law review articles, links to pro Second Amendment webpages, and a link to Second Amendment blogs. There is also The Home Page of David T. Hardy which includes more of his archives and links to related pages. Hardy's scholarly papers, including topics including the Fourteenth Amendment, The Bill of Rights, and Originalism as it applies to the Second Amendment can be found on the Social Science Resource Network.

Hardy authored a book and website critical of the filmmaker Michael Moore due to Moore's film Bowling for Columbine supporting gun control.

== Selected bibliography ==
=== Law review articles ===
- Hardy, David T. and Stompoly, John (1974). Of Arms and the Law Chicago-Kent Law Review, 51, 62–113. Online
- Hardy, David T. (1986). The Firearms Owners' Protection Act: A historical and legal perspective. Cumberland Law Review, 17, 585–682. Online
- Hardy, David T. (1986). Armed citizens, citizen armies: Toward a jurisprudence of the Second Amendment. Harvard Journal of Law & Public Policy, 9, 559–638. Online
- Hardy, David T. (1987). The Second Amendment and the historiography of the Bill of Rights. Journal of Law & Politics, 4, 1–62. Online
- Hardy, David T. (2007). A well–regulated militia: The Founding Fathers and the origin of gun control in America. William & Mary Bill of Rights Journal, 15, 1237–1284.
- Hardy, David T. (2007). Standing to Sue in the Absence of Prosecution: Can a Case Be Too Controversial for Case or Controversy? Thomas Jefferson Law Review, Vol. 30, p. 53, 2007. Online
- Hardy, David T. (2008). The Lecture Notes of St. George Tucker: A Framing Era View of the Bill of Rights. Northwestern University Law Review, Vol. 103, p. 272, 2008. Online
- Hardy, David T. (2008). McDonald v. Chicago: Fourteenth Amendment Incorporation and Judicial Role Reversals. New York University Journal of Law and Liberty Vol. 8 No. 1. Online
- Hardy, David T. (2009). Original Popular Understanding of the Fourteenth Amendment as Reflected in the Print Media of 1866–1868. Whittier Law Review, 30 695–722. Online
- Hardy, David T. (2009). Originalism and its Tools: A Few Caveats. Akron Law Review, Forthcoming. Online
- Hardy, David T. (2011). The Recent Rise, and More Recent Demise, of the 'Collective Right' Interpretation of the Second Amendment. Cleveland State Law Review, Vol. 59, No. 3, 2011. Online
- Hardy, David. T. (2014). Dred Scott, John San(d)Ford, and the Case for Collusion. Northern Kentucky Law Review, Vol. 41, No. 1, 2014. Online

=== Books ===
- Hardy, David T. (1986). Origins and Development of the Second Amendment: A Sourcebook, Blacksmith Corporation. ISBN 0-941540-13-8
- Hardy, David T., & Kimball, Rex (2001). This Is Not an Assault: Penetrating the Web of Official Lies Regarding the Waco Incident, Xlibris Corporation. ISBN 0-7388-6341-6
- Hardy, David T., & Clarke, Jason. (2004). Michael Moore Is a Big Fat Stupid White Man, HarperCollins. ISBN 0-06-076395-7

=== Films ===
- Hardy, David T. (2006). In Search of the Second Amendment. Second Amendment Films LLC.
