= Jason Clarke (writer) =

Writer and web developer (born 1978)

Jason Clarke (born October 26, 1978, in New London, Connecticut) is a writer and web developer living in Orono, Maine.

His first book, Michael Moore Is a Big Fat Stupid White Man, co-written with David T. Hardy, was released in June 2004 and spent six weeks on The New York Times Bestseller list for Hardcover Nonfiction. The book is a critical analysis of the career and persona of acclaimed documentary filmmaker and author Michael Moore. Clarke is now the CEO of RainStorm Consulting, a web developing company in Orono, Maine.
