= Dave Kopel =

American journalist

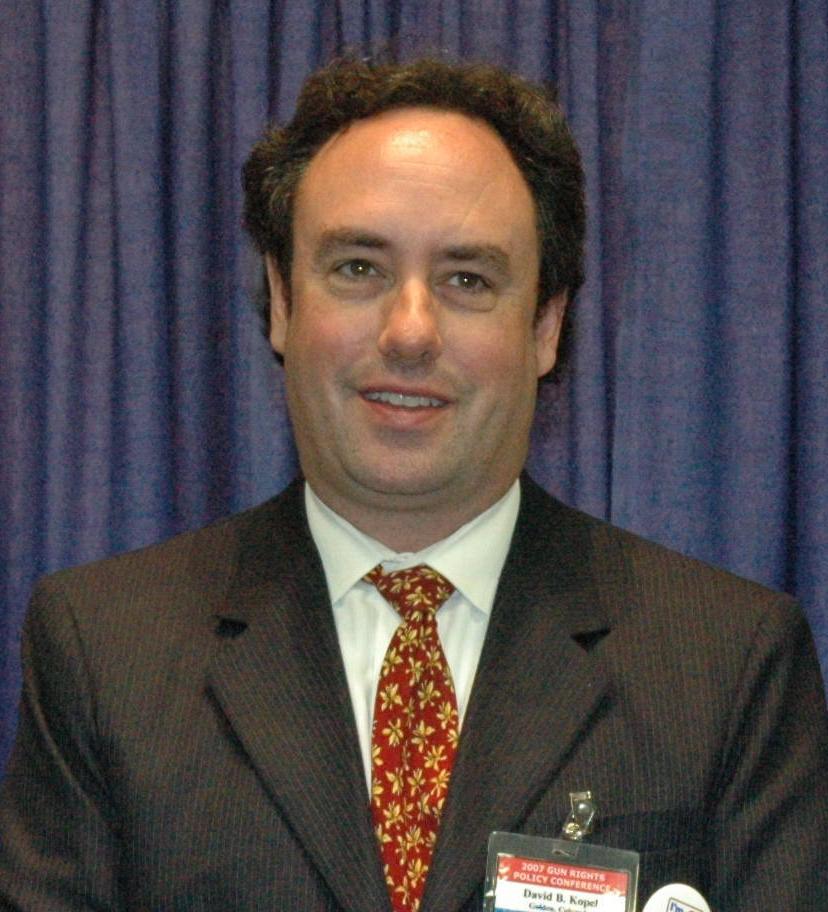
- Born: David B. Kopel; January 7, 1960 (age 66)
- Education: Brown University (BA); University of Michigan Law School
- Occupations: Author; attorney; gun rights advocate; journalist
- Political party: Democratic
- Website: davekopel.org

David B. Kopel (born January 7, 1960) is an American author, attorney, gun rights advocate, and contributing editor to several publications.

As of August 2021, he is research director of the Independence Institute, associate policy analyst at the Cato Institute, adjunct professor of advanced constitutional law at Denver University, Sturm College of Law and contributes to the Volokh Conspiracy legal blog. Previously he was adjunct professor of law, New York University, and former assistant attorney general for Colorado.

Kopel is also a life member of the Academy of Criminal Justice Sciences, and, as of 2010, served on the board of directors of the Colorado Union of Taxpayers.

== Early life and education ==
Kopel earned a B.A. in history with highest honors from Brown University, and won the National Geographic Society Prize for best history thesis with a biography of Arthur M. Schlesinger Jr. He graduated magna cum laude from the University of Michigan Law School. He was also a contributing editor of the Michigan Law Review.

== Political views and activism ==
Kopel is a lifelong registered Democrat who identifies as small government libertarian, who voted for Ralph Nader in 2000. In addition, he voted for Ron Paul in 1988; and George W. Bush in 2004 for reasons related to foreign policy.

Kopel opposes gun control and is a benefactor member of the National Rifle Association of America. His articles on gun control and gun violence have been cited in the Opposing Viewpoints Series. In 2003, Kopel wrote in National Review "Simply put, if not for gun control, Hitler would not have been able to murder 21 million people." In 2008, he contributed an article to the 59th Volume of the Syracuse Law Review entitled "The Natural Right of Self-Defense: Heller's Lesson for the World". He appeared in FahrenHYPE 9/11, a film that disputes the allegations in Fahrenheit 9/11. Kopel's Independence Institute received 1.42 million dollars of funding for its activities by the National Rifle Association.

Kopel testified before a U.S. Senate Judiciary Committee on March 26, 2019, that he supports red flag laws, which empower judges to order the temporary seizure of firearms from persons they deem to be of high threat to themselves or others.

In 2008, Kopel appeared before the United States Supreme Court as part of the team presenting the plaintiff's oral argument in District of Columbia v. Heller. His Heller amicus brief for a law coalition of law enforcement organizations and district attorneys was cited four times in the Court’s Heller opinions. His brief in McDonald v. Chicago (2010) was cited by Justice Samuel Alito's plurality opinion, and twice by Justice John Paul Stevens's dissent. He has also testified numerous times before Congress and state legislatures, including before the U.S. Senate Judiciary Committee on the Supreme Court nominations of Elena Kagan and Sonia Sotomayor.

Kopel testified on January 30, 2013, six weeks after the Newtown, Connecticut, Sandy Hook Elementary School shooting, before the Senate Judiciary Committee on gun violence. One month later, MSNBC.com revealed that Kopel and the Independence Institute had received $108,000 in grants from the National Rifle Association's Civil Rights Defense Fund, and that another witness at the Senate Judiciary hearing, David T. Hardy, testifying as a private attorney in Tucson, Arizona, had received $67,500 in grants from the same NRA fund in 2011.

Kopel was the lead attorney in a May 2013 Federal civil rights lawsuit against the State of Colorado aimed at blocking several "Democratic gun control measures passed by the state legislature and signed into law by Governor John Hickenlooper" in March 2013.

The Fox News affiliate station in Denver, Fox31, and correspondent Eli Stokols in May 2013 revealed that Kopel had received $1.39 million in grant money from the NRA Civil Rights Defense Fund between 2004 and 2011. Fox31 reported Kopel's NRA funding after the Colorado-based Independence Institute filed suit in Colorado challenging the state's gun laws, with Kopel as the lead attorney.

Kopel has authored columns in outlets including The Denver Post, The Washington Post, the Los Angeles Times, The New York Times and The Wall Street Journal, and articles in law reviews including the Harvard Law Review, Yale Law Journal, Michigan Law Review, University of Pennsylvania Law Review, SAIS Review, and the Brown Journal of World Affairs.

The New York Times changed Kopel's author ID for the online opinion piece, "Bloomberg’s Gun Control That Goes Too Far for the Average Citizen", on April 18, 2014, to declare that that Independence Institute, where Kopel is research director, has "received grant money from the National Rifle Association's Civil Rights Defense Fund." On April 24, 2014, The Progressive reported that Kopel and his Independence Institute "have received over $1.42 million, including about $175,000 a year over eight years, from the NRA."
