= Past Continuous =

1977 novel by Yaakov Shabtai

- Hebrew edition
- Author: Yaakov Shabtai
- Original title: Zikhron Devarim (זכרון דברים)
- Translator: Dalya Bilu
- Language: Hebrew
- Publisher: Siman Kriah
- Publication date: 1977
- Publication place: Israel
- English publication date: 1985
- Media type: Print (Hardcover & Paperback)
- Pages: 282 pp, 389 pp in translation
- ISBN: 0-8276-0239-1
- OCLC: 11133408
- Dewey Decimal: 892.4/36 19
- LC Class: PJ5054.S2643 Z3313 1985
- Followed by: Past Perfect (Sof Davar)

Past Continuous is a 1977 novel originally written in Hebrew by Israeli novelist Yaakov Shabtai. The original title, Zikhron Devarim (Hebrew: זכרון דברים) is a form of contract or letter of agreement or memorandum, but could also be translated literally as Remembrance of Things.

Past Continuous is Shabtai's first, and only completed, novel. It was written as one continuous 280-page paragraph (broken up in the English translation), with some sentences spanning several pages.

== Plot summary ==
The novel follows three friends, Goldman, Caesar, and Israel, living in 1970s Tel Aviv, along with their acquaintances, romantic partners, and relatives. The story begins with the death of Goldman's father on April 1 and ends shortly after Goldman's suicide on January 1. The past is interwoven with this brief "present" period through a complex stream of associations.

The three men, lurching between guilt and depression, lose themselves in sexual adventures, amateur philosophy or compare their lives unfavorably to those of their sometimes heroic, sometime pitiful elders. The older characters can always hold firm to something or other, whether socialism and hatred of religious Jews, insights gained in Siberia, or refusal to admit that Israel is not Poland. The younger characters seethe instead in doubt and sweat.

== Major themes ==
=== Past vs. present ===
In Past Continuous Shabtai expresses the personal loss felt by the main characters, which is echoed by the changing city of Tel Aviv, and infiltrates every narrative perspective:

From one day to the next, over the space of a few years, the city was rapidly and relentlessly changing its face…and Goldman, who was attached to these streets and houses because they, together with the sand dunes and virgin fields, were the landscape in which he had been born and grown up, knew that this process of destruction was inevitable, and perhaps even necessary, as inevitable as the change in the population of the town, which in the course of a few years had been filled with tens of thousands of new people, who in Goldman’s eyes were invading outsiders who had turned him into a stranger in his own city, but this awareness was powerless to soften the hatred he felt for the new people or the helpless rage which engulfed him at the sight of the destructive plague changing his childhood world and breaking it up…

This uncontrollable remembrance of events through the objects and landmarks that surround the characters point to their obsession with the past, neither nostalgic nor inspiring, but menacing, a reminder to the new generation that they could never achieve what past generations have. This theme is also presented through the occupations of the three main characters: Israel's piano playing, Goldman's translations and Caesar's photography all require a prior model or text - they can only reflect reality, and never create anything original.

=== Stream of consciousness ===
The flow of the narrative mixes past and present, thoughts and events, to create a stream of consciousness that moves from one character's mind to another, often through objects and experiences:

The prolonged paragraph replicates the exceptional intimacy of a society whose members are bound together by stronger-than-family ties and can hardly visit their parents or walk along the beach or drive to a funeral or an assignation without recalling who lived where and when or who had done what, where, and how.

The stream of collective consciousness Shabtai uses creates significant juxtapositions between events and produces irony. For example, when Shabtai presents the death of Aryeh, one of Caesar's relatives, the minor details brought up throughout the account puncture the tragic event:

[Aryeh] shot himself in the mouth with a pistol and was found two days later in his car on a dirt road between orange groves not far from the sea dressed in a leather suit and a floral shirt and a yellow tie, and Erwin and Caesar, who took the wooden mask of the African god from his mother and placed it on one of the shelves in the bookcase, went to identify the body in the morgue, because Yaffa and Tikva and also Zina, who looked at the mask absentmindedly and said, “Very nice,” couldn’t face it, and the two of them, together with Besh, told Yaffa, who fainted in the living room before they even told her, just as she had fainted when she heard that Tikva’s Hungarian engineer wasn’t an engineer, knocking over her cup and spilling the coffee, and Caesar made haste to pour cold water over her and the drops splashed onto Besh and Zina, who was trying to comfort her sister with a pale and frightened face but at the same time was filled with anger against her because of the whole business and because of the coffee stains spreading over the carpet and the wall, which Zina tried to clean with a wet cloth as soon as Yaffa had recovered a little, but without any success, and the stains continued to annoy her – until they repainted the whole room, which was already after Aryeh’s funeral…

The central fact of Aryeh's suicide is not as important as the values of Israeli society revealed through the smaller incidents around it, e.g. Yaffa's identical reactions to all bad news and Zina's greater concern for the coffee stains.

=== Existentialism ===
Shabbtai's three protagonists all feel a fundamental sickness because of their meaningless existence and the absurd world they inhabit, and have no choice but to denounce the world that betrayed them. According to Gershon Shaked, Shabtai is probably the only Israeli novelist who has “reached a deep understanding of the double meaning of the [Zionist] meta-narrative and the double meaning of the positive heroes.” Past continuous could be seen as an elegy for the working class which, due to its economic successes, has now become decadent. This decadence touches the younger generation as well, and both young and old are doomed from the first sentence of the novel:

Goldman’s father died on the first of April, whereas Goldman himself committed suicide on the first of January – just when it seemed to him that finally, thanks to the cultivation of detachment and withdrawal, he was about to enter a new era and rehabilitate himself by means of the “Bullworker” and a disciplined way of life, and especially by means of astronomy and the translation of the Somnium.

The younger generations attempts to replace the ideals of the past with sex, self-obsession, and meaningless routines, but these all fail. The only positive force that exists in the novel is the skillful use of language. The death of Zionist ideals engenders the birth of linguistic art, “Though words betray Shabtai’s hero, the storyteller believes these treacherous words. He believes in their symbolic power to describe his crumbling existence.”

Somewhat like James Joyce’s Ulysses, Past Continuous presents a funeral at the beginning and a birth at the end (the 'present' of the story spans a gestation period of nine months, from April 1 to January 1). In this case, however, there is no triumph of life over death, and the book ends with an image of the world as a grotesque caricature, populated by people who are dead while still alive:

…but Ella ignored her baby, whose head was covered with a fine black down, and the nurse held him helplessly in her hands and pleaded with Ella gently to take him, and then she asked her again, this time impatiently, to take him and feed him like all the other mothers, but Ella went on ignoring her baby, just as she went on ignoring Israel, who remained standing stubbornly by the bed and did not take his eyes off her as they slowly filled with tears and her face grew more and more blurred until it dissolved into the whiteness of the pillows, and behind him he heard the head nurse clapping her hands again, and finally she turned to him and asked him to leave – all the other visitors had already gone – and Israel took two or three steps backward and then he turned around and walked out of the room.

== Literary significance ==
Past Continuous is considered the first novel ever to be written in truly vernacular Hebrew and in 2005 it was named the best novel written about Tel Aviv by Time Out Tel Aviv. Full of incidental information on the ups and downs of Zionism, the novel serves as an introduction to Israel as well as to Israeli literature. It received international acclaim as a unique work of modernism, prompting critic Gabriel Josipovici of The Independent to name it the greatest novel of the decade in 1989, comparing it to Proust's In Search of Lost Time.

In a 2007 survey among 25 top Israeli publishers, editors, and critics, Past Continuous was chosen the best Hebrew book written in Israel since the foundation of the state in 1948.

== Film adaptation ==
- In 1995 Director Amos Gitai adapted the book into a film Zihron Devarim (released as Devarim in France, L'Inventario in Italy and Things in English-speaking markets), starring Assi Dayan, Amos Shub, Lea Koenig, and Gitai himself.
- In 2012 Director David Abramov ("דייב אברמוב") adapted the book into a short film, titled Hitabdot Aliza /'התאבדות עליזה' (English title: 'Yisrael's Cheerful Requiem') starring Eldad Carin (as Israel), Ari Libsker (as Goldman), Rana Werbin (Eliezra), and Adi Kum (as Ela).

== Editions ==
Hebrew

- Zikhron Devarim. Tel Aviv: Siman Kriah, 1977. Reprinted 1994.

English

- Past Continuous. Overlook Press, 1983, reprinted 2004, ISBN 0-7156-3272-8
- Past Continuous. Jewish Publication Society of America, 1985, ISBN 0-8276-0239-1
- Past Continuous. Schocken Books, 1989, ISBN 0-8052-0868-2
