= Matthijs Wouter Knol =

Dutch film programme curator and producer

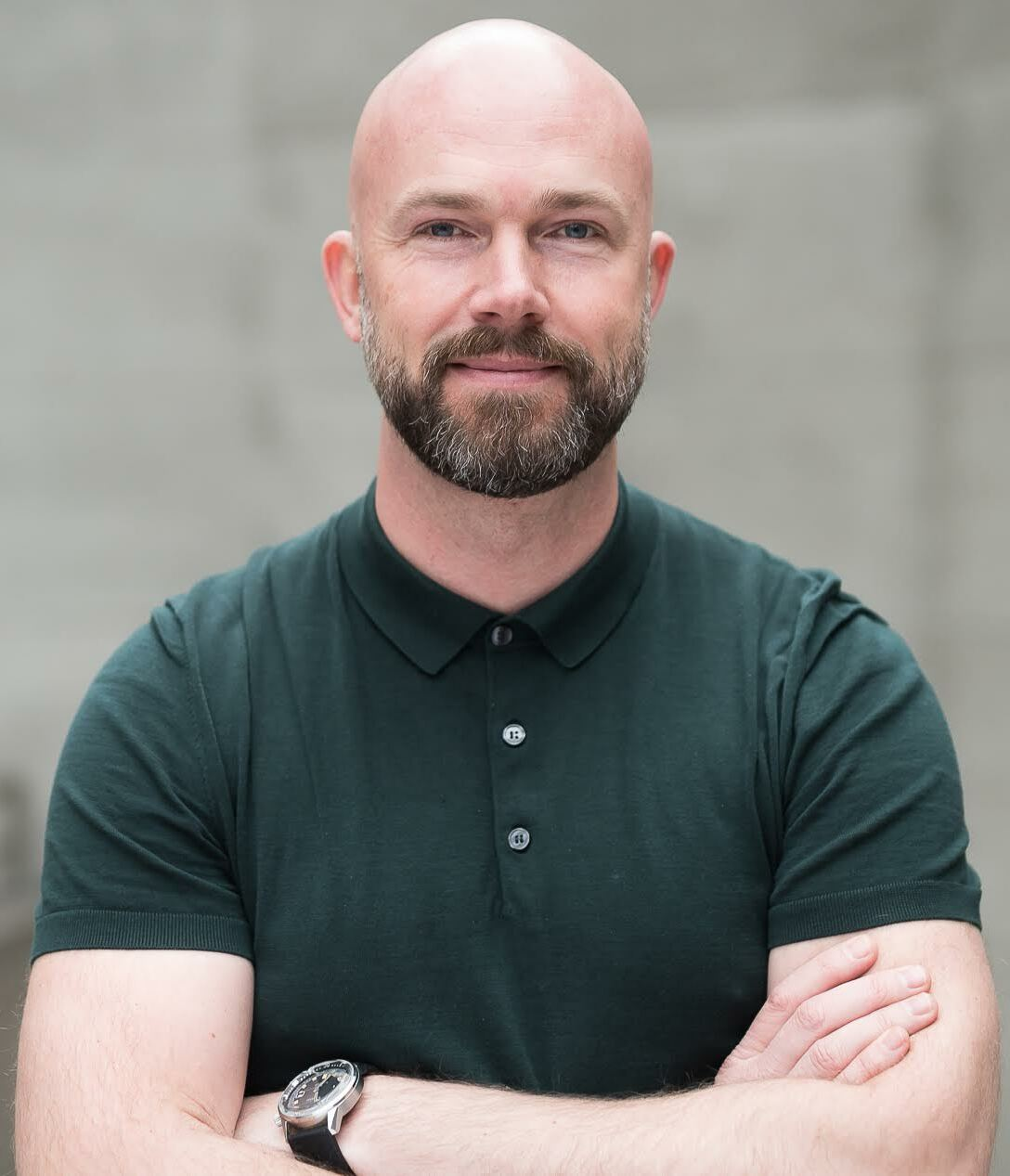
Matthijs Wouter Knol (2020)

Matthijs Wouter Knol (Dutch: [mɑˈtɛis ˈʋʌutər ˈknɔl]; born 9 May 1977) is a Dutch film programme curator and producer, mainly known for his work at several international film festivals and as director of the European Film Academy. Knol's career started in Amsterdam, where he initially worked as a producer of documentary films and for IDFA, the International Documentary Filmfestival Amsterdam.

== Early life and education ==
Matthijs Wouter Knol was born in Assen, the Netherlands. He is the son of Dutch poet Henk Knol (1955). He grew up in the Dutch province of Gelderland, first in Hoenderloo (1978-1982) and then in Ede (1982-1995).

After graduating from a gymnasium secondary school in Amersfoort, he read History at Leiden University (1995-2000), specialising in Modern and Contemporary History. In 1998 he was selected for an extracurricular seminar and in 1999 continued studying with a scholarship at the Royal Netherlands Institute in Rome, where he did research and wrote his thesis “La terza Roma: Political Ideology and Architecture at the Italian World Fair in Rome 1911”, supported by historians Catrien Santing, Hans de Valk, and Boudien de Vries.

== Career ==
Knol began his career in the audiovisual industry in 2000, working for the Dutch television channel NTR (them NPS), as an editorial intern for the award-winning Dutch history television magazine Andere Tijden, being mentored by its founder and main editor Ad van Liempt.

After finishing his studies at Leiden University, he started working in 2001 at the production company Pieter van Huystee Film, which mainly specialised in feature length documentaries for cinema a television, short films and experimental films, as well as television fiction. In the years 2001–2007, he worked and was credited under the name “Matthijs Koenen”. From 2004 onwards, he worked as Head of Development, working with documentary filmmakers on creatively developing treatments and setting up financing strategies for their films. He worked closely together with Amsterdam-based Dutch and international filmmakers Heddy Honigmann (Dame la Mano), Mani Kaul (I Am No Other), Peter Delpeut (Go West, Young Man!), Ramón Gieling (Johan Cruijff – En Un Momento Dado, Tramontana, Cine Ambulante, Welcome to Hadassah Hospital, BiBaBo), Marjoleine Boonstra (What Keeps Mankind Alive, Haven), Boris Gerrets (Garden Stories, Driving Dreams, People I Could Have Been and Maybe Am), Ditteke Mensink (Farewell), Klaartje Quirijns (The Dictator Hunter), Mercedes Stalenhoef (Carmen Meets Borat), Ester Gould, Sophie Hilbrand, Jack Janssen (Fairuz – We Loved Each Other So Much), Oeke Hoogendijk (The New Rijksmuseum), Ineke Smits (Putin's Mama), Danniel Danniel and Juliano Mer Khamis (Arna's Children) en Kees Vlaanderen (Noordeloos, Drijfzand), among others. Many of the films he collaborated on won international awards.

Between 2005 and 2007, he developed and produced the digital edition of Dutch filmmaker Johan van der Keuken’s complete oeuvre, which was awarded the “Prix Cahiers du Cinéma” for best DVD edition in 2006 by a jury presided by French filmmaker André Téchiné. In 2007, he started working for IDFA, setting up the festival's industry office which contained the co-production and sales markets Forum and Docs for Sale, as well as the educational programme IDFAcademy. In charge of the latter programme, he initiated the IDFAcademy Summer School in 2008.

=== Berlin years ===
Shortly afterwards, in September 2008, Matthijs Wouter Knol was appointed programme manager of the Berlinale Talent Campus by Dieter Kosslick, then director of the Berlin International Film Festival. In his role as programme manager, he organised numerous and notable seminars, conferences, labs and workshops with an plethora of internationally acclaimed speakers and mentors from the film industry. During his management, the name and profile of the Campus programme were changed into “Berlinale Talents”, and with it the names of the affiliated regional satellite programmes of Berlinale Talents in Guadalajara (Mexico), Buenos Aires (Argentina), Durban (South Africa), Sarajevo (Bosnia and Herzegovina). He initiated new Talents programmes in Tokyo (Japan, 2011) and Beirut (Lebanon, 2014).

Subsequently, Knol was appointed in 2014 as director of the European Film Market (EFM), the Berlinale's annual business platform and the second-largest film industry gathering of the international film industry. He succeeded former long-time director Beki Probst. Focusing on modernising the market place during his tenure, he actively implemented new platforms into the existing market structure and developed new business formats, resulting in an increasing amount of visitors (2020: 11.423) and fast-growing sales and revenue numbers. Among the new, successful platforms were the EFM Producers Hub, EFM DocSalon, Berlinale Series Market & Conference, Berlinale Africa Hub, EFM Landmark and EFM Horizon. He introduced and organised “Country in Focus” programmes at the European Film Market with Mexico (2017), Canada (2018), Norway (2019) and Chile (2020). He continued his work as director of the European Film Market under the new Berlinale management of executive director Mariëtte Rissenbeek and artistic director Carlo Chatrian in 2019.

Matthijs Wouter Knol was a member of the selection committee of the Competition of the Berlin International Film Festival between 2014 and 2019. In 2011, he was one of the co-founders of the “Berlinale Residency” programme, which in its first years was the starting point of award-winning films such as Foxtrot (Samuel Maoz, 2018) and the Academy Award-winning A Fantastic Woman (Sebastian Lelio, 2017).

=== European Film Academy ===
In January 2021, Matthijs Wouter Knol was appointed by the board of the European Film Academy as its new director, succeeding Marion Döring. In the first year of his tenure at the Academy, he initiated the Anti-Racism Taskforce for European Film (ARTEF), addressing widespread institutional racism in the industry and forming a conglomerate of European film organisations and institutions aiming to tackle this. He also acts as a board member of the International Coalition for Filmmakers at Risk (ICFR), of which the European Film Academy is a founding partner.

In July 2026, Matthijs Wouter Knol was appointed the jury member at the 32nd Sarajevo Film Festival for Competition Programme – Feature Film.

== Extra ==
During his work as an associate producer in Amsterdam, Matthijs Wouter Knol was a board member of the Foundation Arts & Ex, producing photography exhibitions related to documentary films. Among the exhibitions he worked on were “Body and City” by Johan van der Keuken (2001) at the Wexner Center for the Arts in Columbus, Ohio and Arti et Amicitiae in Amsterdam, “Go West, Young Man!” (Hans van der Meer, 2003) at the Stedelijk Museum in Amsterdam and Galerie and Concept Store Colette in Paris, and the open air exhibition “Face2Face” (JR, 2007) in Amsterdam. He was the initiator and organiser of the annual “Johan van der Keuken Lectures” in Amsterdam in cooperation with the Netherlands Film Museum, with speakers François Albera (2006) and Péter Forgács (2007).

Knol also worked as a narrator for over a dozen documentary films produced for Dutch public television broadcaster IKON and several exhibitions.

== Personal life ==
Matthijs Wouter Knol lives and works in Berlin. He is a political activist and has worked for and supported initiatives championing an increasing awareness for gender equality and cultural diversity and inclusion in the film industry, advancing LGBTQ rights and addressing the violation of human rights, as well as the lack of attention for the disastrous effects of poor mental health on the film industry.
