= Heinrich Schoeneich =

German plastic surgeon

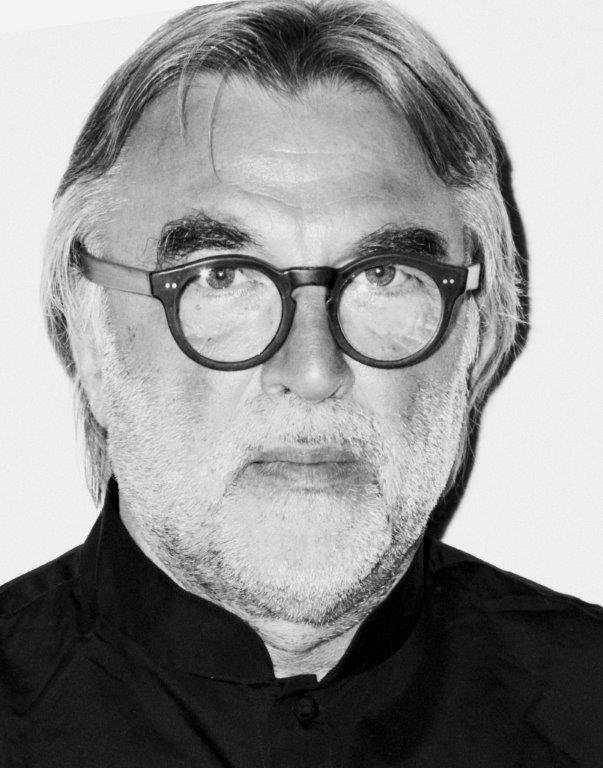
- Dr. Heinrich Schoeneich, 2011
- Born: 2 January 1948 (age 78); Datteln, North Rhine-Westphalia, Germany
- Occupation: Plastic Surgeon
- Years active: 1984 - present
- Organization: INTERPLAST-Germany e.V. / Munich Section
- Known for: Humanitarian Activist
- Board member of: INTERPLAST-Germany e.V. Foundation; INTERPLAST-Germany e.V. / Munich Section; Children's Right Foundation; Myanmar Foundation
- Spouse: Sima Schoeneich
- Children: 2
- Awards: Bambi Charity Award, 2001
- Honours: Cross of the Order of Merit of the Federal Republic of Germany, 2006
- Website: INTERPLAST-Munich

Heinrich Johannes Schoeneich (born January 2, 1948) is a German plastic surgeon and humanitarian activist, who founded and heads the Munich section of Interplast-Germany e.V.

== Life and work ==
In 1984, Schoeneich joined Interplast-Germany e.V., a non-profit medical aid organisation. In 1994, he founded the Munich section of Interplast-Germany e.V. and since then carries out 3 to 4 humanitarian missions a year in (South-East-)Asia, Africa and the Middle-East. In 2004, he co-founded the Interplast Foundation for Humanitarian Plastic Surgery to promote long-term projects.

Since 2012, he is lecturing on medical and ethical aspects of medical humanitarian work at the Technical University of Munich.

In 2001 Schoeneich was awarded the Charity Bambi of the Hubert Burda Media Group for his many years of medical aid in Afghanistan. The award was presented to him by actress and physician Maria Furtwängler on November 15, 2001 in Berlin. In 2003, his work was showcased in a documentary titled "Unter der Haut - Das zweite Leben von Dr. Schoeneich" ("Under the skin - The second life of Dr. Schoeneich"). In 2006, he received the Cross of the Order of Merit of the Federal Republic of Germany for his humanitarian work.

=== First war surgery mission - Thailand | Cambodia (1980) ===
For six weeks in Spring 1980, he assisted in war surgery missions in refugee camps Khao-I-Dang and Nong Mak Mun between Thailand and Cambodia. He was a member of a medical team of the Soforthilfe e.V., a German non-governmental organization, privately established in Munich at the end of 1979 in response to the Cambodian refugee crisis. Initially in cooperation with Rupert Neudeck's committee "Ein Schiff für Vietnam" ("A Ship for Vietnam"), Soforthilfe e.V. provided large-scale medical help on the ground during the Emergency Period 1979-1981.

=== War surgery missions - Pakistan and Afghanistan (1991-2004) ===
Responding to an appeal launched by the European Union in 1991, he flew to Peshawar to treat refugees injured during the Afghan civil war. In 1994, with the Interplast section Frankfurt and the help of the German Embassy, he financed the reconstruction and conversion of a destroyed building into a hospital in Jalalabad. The hospital was inaugurated in September 1995 and throughout its existence the only free-of-charge facility for reconstructive surgery in the region, confiscated by the Taliban at the end of September 1999.

=== Burma / Republic of the Union of Myanmar (since 1997) ===
In 1997 he was authorized by the Burmese Ministry of Health to conduct his first surgical mission in its then capital Yangon in 1997. Up to and including 2020, he and his medical teams have carried out 68 surgical missions throughout the country.

==== Cyclone Nargis ====
The night of May 2 to 3, 2008 he witnessed Cyclone Nargis, one of the most severe tropical cyclones in the history of weather records. In the early morning hours, a state of emergency was declared in Yangon. Due to a news embargo and the travel ban on foreign media representatives, they became of interest to German journalists on their return. In cooperation with the Amara Health Foundation and the Stiftunglife, he initiated the clinic ship project "Swimming Doctors" in April 2009, which is still operating today in the Irrawaddy-delta, the region worst hit by the storm.

=== China (2006) ===
In 2004, he performed surgery on the 15-year-old Chinese Xiao Liewen as a team member with his former professor, reconstructing the burnt right half of her face. For the first time in medical history, the preformation of a nose on the lower abdomen and its transplantation into the face succeeded. A German TV channel filmed the process and aired a documentary in the German TV show Galileo on March 23, 2006. In 2008 and 2013, Galileo aired a follow-up on Liewen's health and professional development. During a mission in China in June 2006, Schoeneich performed a follow-up surgery on her.

=== Peace Missions (Palestine and Irak, 2011) ===
Inspired by the documentary "The Heart of Jenin" and the West-Eastern Divan Orchestra, he assembled a surgical team of Christian, Muslim and Jewish colleagues. Their mission was to take place in Summer 2011 in Jenin, West Bank. On April 4, 2011 Juliano Mer-Khamis, Jewish-Palestinian director, activist and founder of "The Freedom Theater" in Jenin, was shot dead. Since Interplast local associates had also been threatened, the Palestinian Minister of Health moved the planned mission to Nablus, West Bank, where Schoeneich and his interreligious team performed free plastic surgery on 118 Palestinian patients from 23 June to 8 July.

A camera crew from Bayerischer Rundfunk accompanied the mission. The 30-minute documentary "Operation Peace" was broadcast on September 5, 2011, in Das Erste (ARD). "Operation Peace" was mentioned again in Richard C. Schneider's 2018 book on the Middle East conflict.

=== TV and Radio (selection) ===
- 1993 Zeil um Zehn, guest of Alice Schwarzer, subject: Transsexuality; HR.
- 2001 Die Zwei - Maischberger and Schmidbauer, subject: Deviators; BR.
- 2002 Johannes B. Kerner, guest of Johannes B. Kerner; ZDF.
- 2003 Unter der Haut - Das zweite Leben von Dr. Schoeneich, documentary film; ARD, Phoenix, BR.
- 2003 alpha-Forum, in conversation with Silke Yeomans; BR.
- 2006 Bavarian of the Year, Abendschau; BR.
- 2008 People of the week, guest of Frank Elstner; SWR.
- 2010 One to one. The talk - private conversations; Bayern 2.
- 2011 Operation Peace, documentary; ARD.
- 2012 Plastic Surgery: Between Beauty Mania and Reality; SPIEGEL TV THEMA.

=== Press (selection) ===
- 1996 Plastic surgery - victim of the killer bacillus, Focus Magazin.
- 2017 Emergency medicine - When EU foreigners have no place in the healthcare system, Süddeutsche Zeitung.
