= Esther (1986 film) =

- DVD cover art
- Directed by: Amos Gitai
- Written by: Amos Gitai; Stephan Levine
- Starring: Simone Benyamini; Zare Vartanian; Mohammad Bakri; Juliano Mer-Khamis; Shmuel Wolf; Rim Banna; Fouad Awad; Tarik Kopty; George Khleifi
- Cinematography: Henri Alekan; Nurith Aviv
- Production companies: Interkerkelijke Omroep Nederland; Film4 Productions; Herzliya Studios
- Distributed by: Facets Multi-Media
- Release date: 1986
- Running time: 97 minutes
- Countries: Austria; United Kingdom; Netherlands; Israel
- Language: Hebrew

Esther (Hebrew: אסתר) is a 97-minute 1986 Austrian-British-Dutch-Israeli Hebrew-language independent underground dramatic historical experimental art film directed by Amos Gitai, his directorial debut. The film tells the story of Esther from the Hebrew Bible's Book of Esther and stars Simone Benyamini, Zare Vartanian, Mohammad Bakri and Juliano Mer-Khamis.

== Synopsis ==
When King Ahasuerus (Zare Vartanian) of Persia drives out of his court Queen Vashti for refusing to show up before him, a frantic search for young virgins is unleashed throughout the kingdom, extending from India to Ethiopia. Esther, an orphan who was raised by her Jewish uncle, Mordecai (Mohammad Bakri), has entered the King's harem, having been chosen as his wife without the knowledge that she was Jewish. At court, she has thwarted an attack against the King thanks to information provided by her uncle. For the service rendered, Esther and Mordecai have become the only free court characters not to prostrate themselves in front of anyone. However, when Mordecai refuses to bow to Minister Haman (Juliano Mer-Khamis), the latter commands the death of all of the Jews of the kingdom under the seal of the King. This is discovered by Esther and Mordecai, who devise a plan to save their people. Mordecai acts in advance against Haman, ordering the vengeful extermination of all of those who want the death of the Jews.

== Cast ==
- Simone Benyamini as Esther
- Zare Vartanian as Ahasuerus
- Mohammad Bakri as Mordecai
- Juliano Mer-Khamis as Haman
- Shmuel Wolf
- Rim Banna
- Fouad Awad
- Tarik Kopty
- George Khleifi

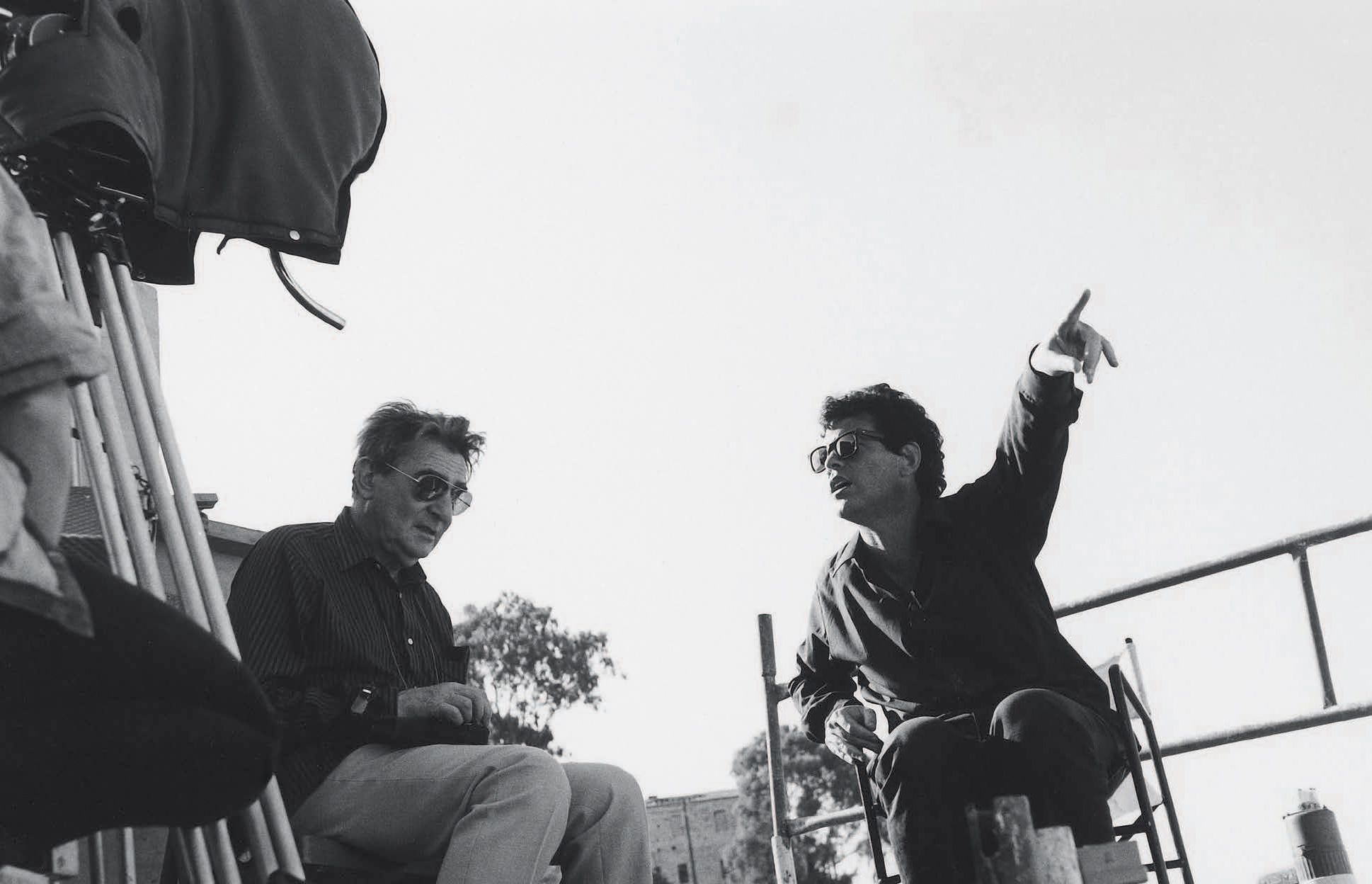
The shooting of the film

== Production ==
The film marked the directorial debut of Amos Gitai, who also wrote the screenplay. It was shot by Henri Alekan and Nurith Aviv (with Ilan Yagoda assisting), and cast by Levia Hon.

Developed at Herzliya Studios and financed by Interkerkelijke Omroep Nederland and Film4 Productions, the film was distributed by Facets Multi-Media.

== Release ==
The film was screened at the May 1986 Cannes Film Festival during the International Critics's Week, at the October 1986 Torino Film Festival where it also won several awards, and at the 36th Berlin International Film Festival on 21 February 1992. The film was released in Israel, where it premiered at the Tel Aviv Museum of Art, together with Berlin-Jerusalem (1989) as part of a DVD boxset in 2005.

== Critical response ==
Stephen Holden of The New York Times opined that "[t]hough not especially entertaining, it is quite handsome and bristling with ideas." In Israel, however, some reviewers were more negative. Daniel Warth of Ha'ir, while noticing similarities to the works of Pier Paolo Pasolini, Bertolt Brecht, and Miklós Jancsó, stated that the film "is an artistic pretension which remains nothing but an aesthical drill with unsophisticated political declarations."
