= Jesus (1979 film) =

1979 film by Peter Sykes, John Krish

- Theatrical release poster
- Directed by: Peter Sykes; John Krish
- Screenplay by: Barnet Fishbein
- Based on: Gospel of Luke (Good News Translation)
- Produced by: John Heyman
- Starring: Brian Deacon; Rivka Neumann; Yosef Shiloach
- Narrated by: Alexander Scourby
- Cinematography: Mike Reid
- Music by: Luigi Patruno; Luciano Salvemini; Nachum Heiman
- Production companies: Genesis Project; Inspirational Films
- Distributed by: Warner Bros.
- Release date: October 19, 1979
- Running time: 117 minutes
- Country: United States
- Language: English
- Budget: $6 million
- Box office: $4 million

Jesus (also known as The Jesus Film) is a 1979 American biblical drama film directed by Peter Sykes and John Krish, and produced by John Heyman. In Jesus, the life of Jesus Christ is depicted, primarily using the Gospel of Luke as the main basis for the story. A voice-over narration is featured sporadically throughout the film, providing background information on characters and events.

Shot on location in Israel, the film was financed primarily by Campus Crusade for Christ with a budget of $6 million, and was released without production or cast credits, as producer John Heyman declared that the creators of this picture were "simply being translators" of the New Testament's Gospel of Luke, "so nobody will know who produced or directed the film." The end of the film states that the Good News Bible (Today's English Version) was used during filming, and instead of telling a parallel story or embellishing the Biblical account like other Biblical films, the filmmakers chose to adhere to the Gospel of Luke as closely as possible.

The film has been used by the Jesus Film Project, an organisation seeking to translate and distribute the film as part of its evangelistic efforts. Because of this, Jesus is often described as the most-watched motion picture of all time, in addition to being the most translated film of all time.

== Plot ==
During the days of Emperor Augustus and King Herod the Great, Mary is visited by the angel Gabriel who tells her that she will give birth to Jesus, the Son of God. Later, Mary visits Elizabeth, the mother of John the Baptist, who tells her that she is the most blessed of women and that her child is blessed.

When the Romans hold a census, Mary travels with her husband Joseph to his hometown of Bethlehem to register. There, Jesus is born in a manger. A week later, Mary and Joseph travel to Jerusalem to present Jesus at the Temple. There, they are greeted by Simeon, who blesses Jesus as the Christ. At the age of twelve, Jesus becomes separated from his parents during a Passover trip to Jerusalem. When Mary asks about his whereabouts, Jesus tells them that he was in His Father's house. Years later, during the reign of Emperor Tiberius and King Herod Antipas, John the Baptist baptizes Jesus in the Jordan River and the Holy Spirit descends upon Jesus.

Jesus is subsequently tempted in the wilderness by Satan but withstands the Devil's trials. Travelling to Capernaum, Jesus recruits the disciples Peter, James, and John after helping them to find a large haul of fish. During his preaching ministry, Jesus resurrects the daughter of Jairus. Jesus then recruits twelve apostles from among His disciples including Matthew and Judas Iscariot. Jesus' followers also include several women including Mary Magdalene, Joanna, and Susanna.

The film covers several of Jesus' teachings and messages including the parable of the Pharisee and the tax collector, the Beatitudes, the Golden Rule, loving your enemy, and the Parable of the Sower. While visiting the home of the Pharisee Simon, a sinful woman anoints Jesus' feet, prompting Jesus to forgive her sins. Jesus and his disciples later travel across the Sea of Galilee where he calms the storm. At Gerasa, Jesus exorcises a demon-possessed man and the demons enter a herd of swine. At Bethsaida, Jesus feeds five thousand with five loaves and two pieces of fish. Later, Jesus and his disciples travel up a mountain where Jesus encounters Moses and the prophet Elijah and is transfigured.

As Jesus' preaching and healing ministry grows, he reaches out to the sinners and outcasts including prostitutes and tax collectors, earning the ire of the Pharisees and religious teachers. Jesus also befriends the tax collector Zaccheus, convincing him to repay people he has extorted. While preaching the Parable of the Good Samaritan, Jesus befriends a little girl and tells his disciples not to forbid the little children from coming to Him. Jesus draws the attention of the Pharisees, Jewish religious leaders, and Romans after he drives the merchants out of the Temple. In Jerusalem, Jesus teaches the Parable of the Tenants and to pay taxes to Caesar. At the Last Supper, Jesus warns his disciples of his impending betrayal and death. Judas conspires with the religious leaders to betray Jesus.

At the Garden of Gethsemane, Jesus is betrayed by Judas and captured by the Jewish authorities. Peter denies knowing Jesus three times before the cock crows. The following day, Jesus is condemned by the religious leaders. He is then brought before Pontius Pilate, who sends him to Herod. While Pilate exonerates Jesus of wrongdoing, the religious leaders and crowd demand Jesus' death. After being scourged, Jesus is forced to carry his cross through the streets. When he collapses from exhaustion, Simon of Cyrene is obliged to carry his cross. At Golgotha, Jesus is crucified besides two robbers, one of whom recognizes him as the Messiah. Following Jesus' death at noon, the sky is plunged into darkness and the curtain of the Temple is ripped through the middle. Joseph of Arimathea buries Jesus in a tomb. Jesus rises from the dead on the third day. Before ascending back to Heaven, Jesus tells his disciples that all power and authority has been given to Him and commands them to go and make disciples of all nations.

== Cast ==
- Brian Deacon as Jesus
- Rivka Neumann as Mary
- Yosef Shiloach as Joseph
- Talia Shapira as Mary Magdalene
- Alexander Scourby as Luke
- Niko Nitai as Simon Peter
- Ori Levy as Caiaphas
- Mosko Alkalai as Matthew
- Kobi Assaf as Philip
- Moti Baharav as Simon of Cyrene
- Ya'ackov Ben-Sira as Zacchaeus
- Ze'ev Berlinski as Blind Beggar
- Eli Cohen as John the Baptist
- Eli Danker as Judas Iscariot
- Dina Doron as Elizabeth
- Shoshana Duer as the hunchback woman in the temple
- Peter Frye as Pontius Pilate
- Nisim Gerama as Thomas
- David Goldberg as Judas, son of James
- Timothy Mark Hanson as the rich young ruler
- Yiftach Katzur as the epileptic boy
- Rula Lenska as Herodias
- Avi Loziah as the demonic man
- Miki Mfir as Simon the Pharisee
- Yitzhak Ne'eman as James
- Shmuel Ornstein as Simeon
- Richard Peterson as Herod Antipas
- Milo Rafi as Simon Zelotes
- Shmuel Rodensky as Annas
- Gad Roll as Andrew
- Israel Rubinek as Joseph of Arimathea
- Michael Schneider as the father of the epileptic boy
- Nahum Shalit as Jairus
- Shmuel Tal as John
- Michael Warshaviak as Bartholomew
- Leonid Weinstein as James, son of Alphaeus
- Rolf Brin as the centurion in charge of the Crucifixion
- Dov Friedman as the soldier nailing sign to cross
- Oshik Levi as Dismas, Penitent thief
- Nissan Nativ as John's disciple
- Kevin O'Shea as Gestas, Impenitent thief
- Yossi Pollak as the ruler of the Synagogue
- Dada Rubin as the herdsmen

== Production ==
=== Development ===
Bill Bright, founder of the Campus Crusade for Christ, spent a lot of his early career in Los Angeles trying to convert Hollywood celebrities, and he aspired to make a compelling film about the life of Christ. In 1976, British Jewish producer John Heyman approached Bright to fund his Genesis Project to put the entire Bible on film and to obtain financing for his feature-length film on Jesus. After meeting Heyman, Bright asked then campus ministry director Paul Eshleman to consult with the filmmaker.

Eshleman was pleased with Heyman's short film on the first two chapters of the Gospel of Luke and convinced Bright to endorse the project despite objections from other Campus Crusade leaders who objected to a non-Christian making a film about the Bible. Most of the film's dialogue comes from Luke, which was chosen after Heyman sought advice from clergy and scholars. On his motivation about the Jesus film, Heyman said: "I believed the best-selling book in the world would sell a lot of 8-millimeter and 16-millimeter films." Instead of creating a parallel story for the film or embellishing the biblical account, as is the case with other biblical films such as The Ten Commandments or The Greatest Story Ever Told, the filmmakers chose to adhere as closely as possible to the Gospel of Luke.

After failing to canvass funding from Hollywood studios, the Jesus film would be financed primarily by Campus Crusade supporters Bunker and Caroline Hunt for a sum of $6 million. Almost every line spoken by Jesus in the film is quoted directly from the gospel of Luke, with over 450 leaders and scholars who had reassessed the script for biblical accuracy. Historical accuracy also was assured by implementing clothing, pottery and other props made with 1st century techniques to depict a 2,000-year-old Galilean culture.

=== Filming ===
Jesus main theme
The lush, poignant theme music of Jesus. It was composed by Israeli musician Nachum Heiman in the key of E minor.

Brian Deacon, a Shakespearean actor, was cast as Jesus for his "ethnically correct" olive complexion. In addition to 45 main actors, who were mainly Israelis, another 5,000 extras were involved in the filming. The filmmakers cast Yemenite Jews as background extras because, according to Eshleman, "their facial features have changed the least over 2,000 years."

Filming began late November 1978 on location in Tiberias, Israel, which continued for 31 weeks throughout the country, including the cities of Tel Aviv and Jerusalem. During the production, Heyman revealed that the filmmakers "were required to re-film three days' work," because they "had shown eucalyptus trees in a variety of shots," when, "Eucalyptus trees were introduced to Palestine very much later".

Deacon grew his hair and beard during production, but Heyman had decided for Deacon to wear a wig, and as well as a prosthetic nose so that he had a Mediterranean look. Eshleman, who was on location during much of the principal photography, revealed in the DVD's audio commentary that Deacon was so committed to the film and its message that he read several Bible translations a day in order to make certain that he properly presented Christ's teachings. Because Deacon developed pneumonia during principal photography, doubles were used in certain scenes. Deacon's dialogue mostly comprises full-length passages of scripture, and he is scarcely depicted doing anything other than making miracles and uttering speeches.

Eshleman revealed that Niko Nitai (Simon Peter) became a believer during shooting. As for special effects, the film features puffs of smoke and transparent halos to indicate miracles and angel figures, and a hissing snake and a deep voiceover represent Satan. Heyman's original cut of the Jesus film ran for more than four hours. However, in consultation with Bright and Eshleman, he edited a shorter version for Campus Crusade. Just after filming, Heyman was not satisfied with the accent of the Israeli cast members and decided that they all should be dubbed over by English voice actors using the Received Pronunciation accent.

== Release ==
Jesus was theatrically released by Warner Bros. Pictures in the United States in 330 venues principally in the South and West, which delineated a rare instance of a major studio releasing an "overtly religious picture". To promote the film, Eshleman worked with both evangelical and Catholic churches to arrange group trips and discounts. Four million viewers reportedly watched the Jesus film in late 1979–80. Though popular with Christian audiences, it failed to attract mainstream viewers. It was not financially successful, and left John Heyman's Genesis Project US$4 million in debt.

In Australia, it was released on April 3, 1980; in Portugal on April 9, 1981; in Sweden on November 1, 1985; in Finland on March 14, 1986; in Hungary on 13 December 1990; and in Czechoslovakia in 1991. The film has been screened in 229 countries.

=== Lawsuit ===
Warner Bros. received backlash for distributing simultaneously with Monty Python's Life of Brian (1979), another studio release stigmatised by some religious leaders for its satirical characterisation of events surrounding Jesus Christ, although the studio considered the coinciding releases as "something for everybody". The Jesus producers evaluated whether to take legal action against the studio for a conflict of interest.

=== Ratings and classifications ===
Despite scenes involving crucifixion and flagellation, Jesus received a G rating by the Motion Picture Association of America and, likewise in Australia, received the same classification from the Australian Classification Board. In the United Kingdom, it was granted a A rating by the British Board of Film Classification.

=== Later versions ===
2004 DVD poster

==== 1999-2002 ====
To make the film more relevant for younger viewers, new footage for The Story of Jesus for Children was shot in 1999. Being less violent than the original, it was interwoven into an edit of the original film and released in 2000. In 2001, a new opening sequence depicting the creation of humans, the expulsion from Eden, Abraham's blocked sacrifice of his son, and the prophesies of Isaiah was filmed to show, as Paul Eshleman states in the audio commentary, how Jesus' life fits into the span of history. In 2002, a special edition of Jesus commemorating the September 11 attacks (83 minutes) was distributed in the VHS format. It contains introductions by New York City firefighters and police officers.

==== 2003 ====
An edited DVD edition was also packaged with JESUS: Fact or Fiction?, produced in 2003 by Inspirational Films. This features a section called the "Journey of Spiritual Discovery". Biblical scholars, historians, philosophers, authors, and ministers answer specific questions relating to God, Jesus, Christianity, the archaeological, scientific and historical accuracy of the Bible, and testimony from many Christians. Viewers can browse the numerous topics individually or they can watch the film and, when prompted by a "discovery glass" icon, can access relevant comments. Once finished, the viewer is returned to the scene they were watching.

The version was promoted to Muslims of Iraq during the hardships of the Iraqi War, where its website featured a banner advert that said "Send videocassettes of 'JESUS' to Iraq". The 2003 version premiered in a politically unstable and fundamentally Islamic region in northern Egypt. Documentarian Deep Sehgal filmed the screening as part of a six-month project.

==== 2014 ====
To celebrate the 35th anniversary, a digitally remastered, high definition DVD and Blu-ray version was released in April 2014, with its 173,000 frames being retouched and re-colored. Featuring a new score by John Bisharat and Dolby Digital 5.1 sound, all voices were dubbed over by unknown British voice actors, though Brian Deacon reprised the voiceover for Jesus. With a runtime of 128 minutes, the remastered version includes several bonus featurettes: "The Making of The Jesus Film", "The Impact of the Jesus Film", and "Historical Notes".

On the remaster, The Jesus Film Project executive director Erick Schenkel states: "We believe this new remastered version will give audiences an accurate picture of who Jesus is and why individuals around the world have chosen to follow Him, shown with production values they have come to expect."

== Reception ==
While praising its "meticulous attention to authenticity", critics maligned Jesus for being "painfully monotonous" and "little more than an illustrated gospel, with nothing in the way of historical and social context." The Los Angeles Times called it a "...dull Sunday-School treatment of the life of Christ, meticulously but unimaginatively culled from Luke 3-24."

Despite Bright's endorsement, Heyman's relationship with his former Campus Crusade collaborators deteriorated due to his perception that the latter overlooked his contributions. Heyman also objected to Campus Crusade making multiple different versions. When Campus Crusade produced The Story of Jesus for Children, which included new footage, Heyman sued Crusade on the grounds that the new version damaged his reputation. Though the dispute was settled by the parties out of court, relations between Heyman and Campus Crusade remained poor.

Regarding the foreign reception, Seghal said "The events we witnessed were often bewildering," he says. "But what struck us most was the utter normality of those who were willing to risk their lives for Christ." After the film's reels were sent to remote settlements in Africa, Asia and Latin America, they returned with reports of audiences being in tears during screening with others instantly converting. In Phaphamani, a small village in South Africa with no electricity, the film was screened on a projector which attracted over 350 people, who had probably never watched a motion picture in their life. According to distributor Brian Helstrom, "You could see them physically jump back at the sight of the serpent tempting Jesus. When soldiers whip Jesus, you could hear grown adults crying."

=== Statistics ===
Jesus Film Project leaders state that as of May 2020 it has been viewed over 8.1 billion times by over 4 billion people, making it overwhelmingly the most watched movie of all time. This claim, however, has detractors such as Evangelical leader Vinay Samuel, former executive director of the International Fellowship of Evangelical Mission Theologians, who claimed: "These numbers are, to say the least, not gathered in a social-scientific way", and "They have no way of knowing this". However, according to the Jesus Film Project, a research firm calculated the known viewings of the film from 1979 to 2015 as greater than 7.3 billion.

It is officially accredited by The Guinness Book of World Records as the "Most Translated Film" in history, having been translated and available for download in 1,977 languages as of May 2022, with many others in process. On 28 March 2025, it was announced that the film had been translated into 2,200 languages. By July 2026, it was translated into 2,303 languages.

Regarding the film's popularity, Schenkel said that foreigners and non-believers "saw Jesus speaking their language, they understood that Jesus saw them and loved them... And so we saw movements of people coming to Christ in every one of these people groups." Furthermore, he said, "[In t]hirty-five years, there have [been] 6 billion viewings of the film and over 200 million people have indicated they wanted to become followers of Jesus after seeing the film. So the reach is just more than we could have asked and it really has been a privilege to see how God has used this tool."

In agreement with his missionary agenda, Bright created the Jesus Video Project (JVP) in 1981, which not only spread Jesus to global evangelical activities, but also began on a goal to distribute a copy to every U.S. household. Based on the distribution rate by 2005, JVP did not expect to reach countrywide status until 2040 or later. As of August 2018, over 8 billion viewers were reported through in-person film showings, online platforms and apps, though these reports are likely vastly overinflated.

== International versions ==
In 1980, Bright created the Jesus Film Project organization with the goal of accurately translating Jesus into other languages and showing them around the world. The first translation was done for the Tagalog-speaking people of the Philippines. One of the group's first projects, they ordered for the broadcast of a Hindi version in Indian television. The organization works with thousands of missionaries around the world to show the film, sometimes to audiences who have never seen a motion picture. The Mandarin Chinese version of the film is widely distributed in China by the government-linked China Christian Council's Amity Foundation in Nanjing, both on VCDs and DVD.

Distribution in the United States has included direct mail campaigns sponsored by churches to deliver a copy of the film to every address in select ZIP codes across the country, with more than 4.8 million copies sent to Ohio and Texas alone. In 2004, the organization made the film available for viewing on its website in over 300 languages. Both Jesus and The Story of Jesus for Children are available in DVD and VHS formats. Audio dramatizations in a number of languages are also available. It is the only film that has been dubbed into more than 1000 languages of the world. As of now, more than 1600 languages spoken all over the world have the Jesus film, including in all major international languages. Also in 2004, 300 employees at an office in Orlando, FL translated the film into languages such as Kwanyama, spoken in Angola and Namibia, and as well as the seven varieties of Quechua, a tongue of Quechua people in the Andes.

Regarding its worldwide spread and translations, Eshleman states, "People ask 'Why do you go to those far away places?' It's because those people haven't had a chance. That's all we want to do - to give them a chance to hear the message of Christ in an understandable language near where they live." John Meyer, one of the team members who has helped distributing and translating the film, has said, "I'm willing to lay down my life for Jesus, should it come to that," he told the documentary maker Sehgal. "So if there's a recording in a war-torn country, I'm more than willing to go. Or anywhere else, to be honest."

American aid workers in Afghanistan, who had not been working for the Jesus Film Project, were arrested by the Taliban in 2001 for screening the film to a family there. They were ultimately rescued by US Marines. President George W. Bush welcomed them back to America, saying: "It's been an uplifting experience to talk to these courageous souls".

In the Philippines, the film is traditionally aired every Holy Week yearly (except in 2020 and in 2021, when the film was aired on GTV) on GMA Network, since it premiered on March 29, 2018, and is dubbed in Filipino, along with its children's counterpart, The Story of Jesus for Children.

== See also ==
- Depiction of Jesus
- List of Easter films
- King of Kings (1961 film)
- Jesus of Nazareth (miniseries)
- The Gospel of John (film)
- The Greatest Story Ever Told
- The Passion of the Christ
- Jesus (1973 film)
- Jesus (1999 film)
- Son of God (film)
- The Visual Bible: Matthew
- Magdalena: Released from Shame
