= Berlin-Jerusalem =

- DVD cover
- Directed by: Amos Gitai
- Produced by: Marek Rozenbaum
- Starring: Lisa Kreuzer; Rivka Neumann; Markus Stockhausen
- Music by: Markus Stockhausen; Simon Stockhausen
- Distributed by: Facets Multi-Media
- Release dates: 13 September 1989 (UK); 14 March 1990 (France); 7 December 1990 (Israel); 13 December 1991 (Netherlands)
- Running time: 89 minutes
- Countries: United Kingdom; France; Israel; The Netherlands; Italy
- Languages: English; French; Israeli Hebrew; Dutch; Italian; German

Berlin-Jerusalem (Hebrew: ברלין ירושלים; tr. Berlin Yerushalayim) is an 89-minute 1989 British-Dutch-French-Israeli-Italian English-, French-, German-, and Hebrew-language independent underground dramatic historical experimental art film directed by Amos Gitai.

== Synopsis ==
The film tells the story of two women in the 1930s. The first, Else Lasker-Schüler (Lisa Kreuzer), a German expressionist poet, observes the rise of Nazism in Berlin before leaving for Jerusalem. The second, the Russian Manya Shochat (Rivka Neumann), called Tania in the film, settles in a community in Israel.

== Production ==
The film was produced by Marek Rozenbaum, includes the artistic contributions of Pina Bausch and was inspired by the paintings of George Grosz, was financed by the Italian public television, Nederlandse Omroep Stichting, La Sept, Department for Digital, Culture, Media and Sport’s UK Government Investments’s Channel Four Television Corporation’s Film4 Productions, the Centre national du cinéma et de l’image animée, and Le Volcan, was distributed by Facets Multi-Media, was shot by Henri Alekan and Nurith Aviv, was edited by Marco Melani, Antoine Bonfanti, Michel Klochendler, and Luc Barnier, was cast by Levia Hon, and also stars inter alia Markus Stockhausen (who also composed the score together with Simon Stockhausen), Vernon Dobtcheff, Veronica Lazăr, Bernard Eisenschitz, Yossi Graber, Juliano Mer-Khamis, Mark Ivanir, Keren Mor, Ori Levy, and Ohad Shahar.

== Reception ==
The film was screened at the 46th Venice International Film Festival during September 1989 (where it won several awards and was nominated for the Golden Lion), at the 1990 International Istanbul Film Festival/!f İstanbul Uluslararası Bağımsız Filmler Festivali (where it also won several awards) and International Film Festival Rotterdam, at the British Film Institute’s 1989 BFI London Film Festival, at the 1989 Toronto International Film Festival on 13 September 1989, at the 42nd Berlin International Film Festival on 22 February 1992, and at the 1998 São Paulo International Film Festival. The journalist Daniel Warth has opined that “although the film is minimalistic, it is nonetheless ravishing.” The film was released in Israel, where it was released to the general public by Nurith Shani’s Shani Films and the Tel Aviv Cinematheque on 7 December 1990 (the film was released on 14 March 1990 in France and on 13 December 1991 in the Netherlands), together with Esther (1986) as part of a DVD boxset in 2005.

== Sources ==
- Nassi, Tigal (31 May 2008). יום ירושלים בערוצי הטלוויזיה [Jerusalem Day on the Television Channels]. Haaretz (in Hebrew).
- Willemen, Paul (March 1992). "Bangkok-Bahrain to Berlin-Jerusalem: Amos Gitai's Editing". Screen. Vol. 33, no. 1. pp. 14–26. Reprinted in: Willemen, Paul, ed. (1993). "Bangkok-Bahrain–Berlin-Jerusalem". The Films of Amos Gitai: A Montage. BFI Film Classics. London: British Film Institute. pp. 5–16. ISBN 9780851704166. OCLC 882549941.
- Schultz, Deanne (December 2006). Filmography of World History. Westport, Connecticut and London: Greenwood Publishing Group and Praeger. pp. 15–16. ISBN 9780313326813. OCLC 717252153.
- Schwartz, Oshra (16 October 1989). גלות וציונות [Exile and Zionism] (PDF). Davar (in Hebrew). Tel Aviv-Yafo: Society of Workers.
- Israel, Yael (7 December 1990). אנשים לא מוכנים שיהרסו להם את החלום [People Will Not Consent Into Having Their Dreams Shattered (Part I)] (PDF). Al HaMishmar (in Hebrew). Tel Aviv-Yafo: Hashomer Hatzair and Mapam. p. 18.
- Israel, Yael (7 December 1990). אנשים לא מוכנים שיהרסו להם את החלום [People Will Not Consent Into Having Their Dreams Shattered (Part II)] (PDF). Al HaMishmar (in Hebrew). Tel Aviv-Yafo: Hashomer Hatzair and Mapam. p. 19.
- Klein, Uri. כיוון הרוח [The Direction of the Wind] (PDF). Haaretz (in Hebrew). p. 38.
- Variety Film Reviews, Variety's Film Reviews 1989–1990. Vol. 21. New York: R.R. Bowker and Reed Publishing. 1991. ISBN 9780835230896. OCLC 26478915.
- Milne, Tom; Pym, John, eds. (2007). Time Out Film Guide (15th ed.). London, Gütersloh, and New York: Penguin Books and Time Out. p. 96. ISBN 9781904978602. OCLC 441060357.
- Toubiana, Serge; Piégay, Baptiste (2003). Exils et territoires: Le cinéma d'Amos Gitaï [Exiles and Territories: The Cinema of Amos Gitai] (in French). London, New York, Strasbourg, Paris: Cahiers du cinéma, Arte éd. pp. 144ff. ISBN 9782866422257. OCLC 237852120.
- Coureau, Didier (June 2009). "Esthétique de la traversée: Paysagéité et nomadisme, Berlin Jérusalem et Kedma" [The Aesthetics of Crossing: Landscape and Nomadism, Berlin-Jerusalem and Kedma]. Cinémaction: Revue trimestrielle (in French). Vol. 131, no. Amos Gitaï, entre terre et exil [Amos Gitai, Between Land and Exile]. Condé-sur-Noireau: Éditions Charles Corlet. pp. 20–32.
- Privett, Ray (2009). "Série Exil partie 1, Esther et Berlin Jérusalem" [Exile Series Part 1, Esther and Berlin-Jerusalem]. Cinémaction: Revue trimestrielle (in French). Vol. 131, no. Amos Gitaï, entre terre et exil [Amos Gitai, Between Land and Exile]. Condé-sur-Noireau: Éditions Charles Corlet. pp. 52–57.
- Farassino, Alberto (29 March 1989). "Addio Israele terra d'utopie" [Farewell Israel, the Land of Uopia]. La Repubblica (in Italian).
- "Vita fra spari e rovine" [Life Between Shots and Ruins]. La Repubblica (in Italian). 21 August 1991.
- Schnitzer, Meir (1994). הקולנוע הישראלי: כל העובדות, כל העלילות, כל הבמאים וגם ביקורות [Israeli Cinema: All Facts, All Plots, All Directors, and All Critiques] (in Hebrew). Or Yehuda and Jerusalem: Kinneret Zmora-Bitan, Dvir, Israel Film Archive, Israel Film Institute. p. 320. ISBN 9789652863782. OCLC 31817606.
- Willemen, Paul, ed. (1993). The Films of Amos Gitai: A Montage. BFI Film Classics. London: British Film Institute. pp. 42ff. ISBN 9780851704166. OCLC 882549941.
