= Rivka Neumann =

Israeli actress

- רבקה נוימן
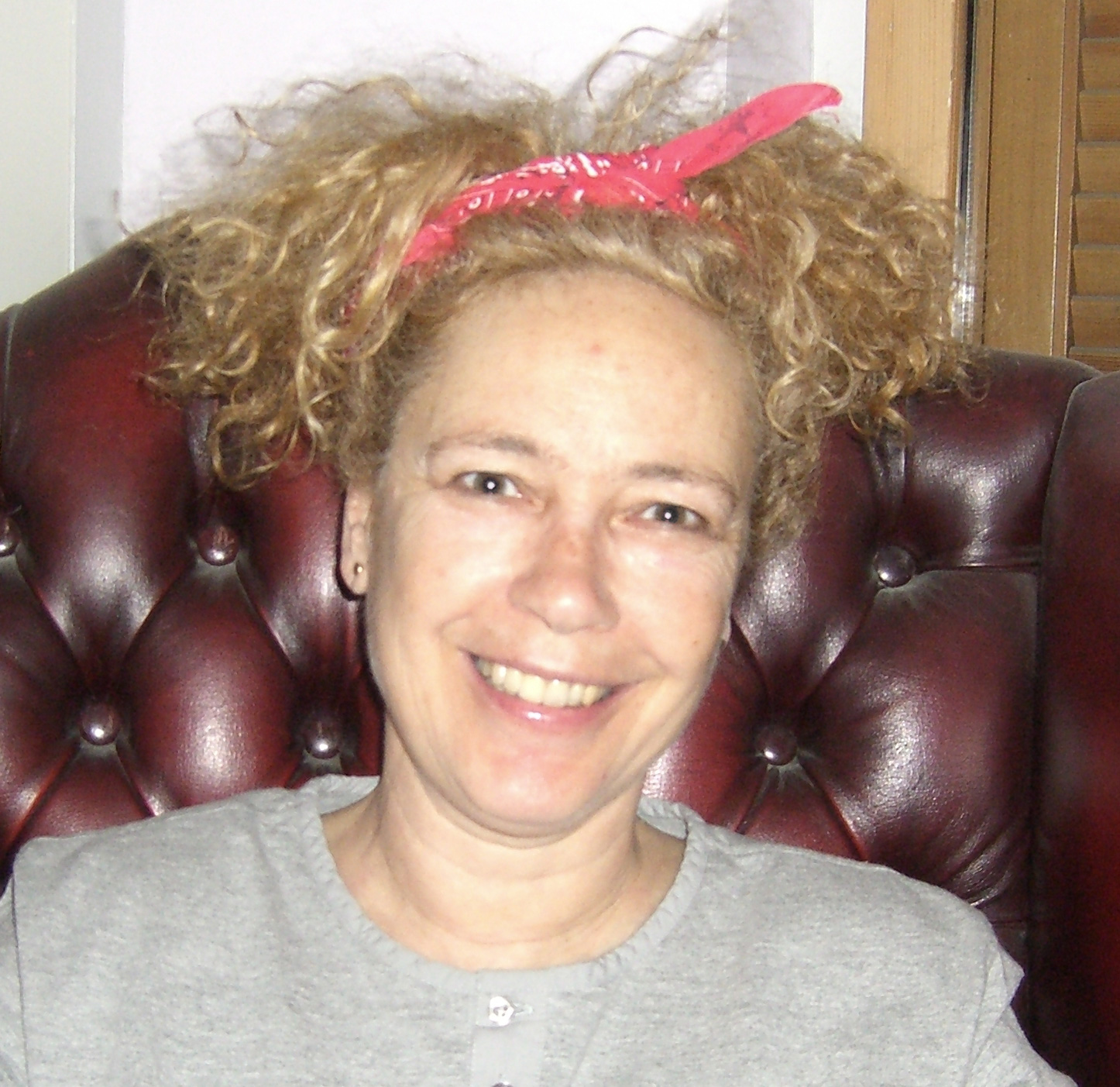
- Rivka Neumann in 2008
- Born: 12 May 1956 (age 70); Mishmarot, Israel
- Education: Nissan-Nativ Acting Studio
- Occupation: Actress
- Notable work: Life According to Agfa, An Electric Blanket named Moshe, The 92 Minutes of Mr. Baum, Sweet Mud, HaAsonot Shel Nina, Berlin-Yerushalaim, Jesus
- Awards: Israeli Theatre Award for Best Supporting Actress (2006)

Rivka Neumann (Hebrew: רבקה נוימן; born 12 May 1956) is an Israeli actress.

== Career ==
Neuman started her acting career at the age of 15, when she left Kibbutz Mishmaroth, in order to pursue her desire for acting. She was accepted to Nissan-Nativ Acting Studio, one of the best acting schools in Israel, and graduated its preparatory and acting classes four years later.

In the many years of her acting, Rivka has performed on the stages of the most respected theaters in Israel: the Habima National Theater, the Cameri Theater, the Beit Lessin Theater, the Khan Theater in Jerusalem, and the Beer-Sheva and Haifa Municipal Theaters.

In the beginning of the 1990s, Rivka decided to become an independent actress who enjoyed maximum freedom to choose her acting roles.

Neumann has a unique ability to transform on stage, as seen in the play Devorah Baron in which her character grew 35 years older in the duration of the play.

Neuman has played a wide variety of main and secondary roles in theatres, television and films, including comedies, dramas and romance. Rivka was also involved in independent productions, including students', on a voluntary basis as part of her ambition to interact with the new generation of Israeli artists. Rivka also has a habit of sketching portraits and events that occur during the preparation of a play, some of which were presented in an exhibition in 2004.

Neuman took the part of Adella in The House of Bernarda Alba by Lorca, Alice in Alice in Wonderland by Lewis Carroll, Angie in Top Girls by Carol Churchill, Anabela in 'Tis Pity She's a Whore by John Ford, Bailke in The Grand Prize by Sholem Aleichem, Barblin in Andorra by Max Frisch, Bat-Sheva in After the Holidays by Yehoshua Kenaz, Bela Barlow in Rubber Merchants by Hanoch Levin, Bessie in Marvin's Room by Scott McPherson, Cherubino in The Follies of a Day or The Marriage of Figaro by Peter Turini, Chorus Leader in Medea by Euripides, Deirdre in Remembrance by Graham Reid, Elinor in Abandoned Property by Shulamit Lapid, Elizabeth Proctor in The Crucible by Miller, Hanzi Brand in Kastner by Moti Lerner, Isabella in Measure for Measure by Shakespeare, Juliet in Romeo and Juliet by Shakespeare, Kasandra in The Lost Women of Troy by Hanoch Levin, Katia in The Storm by Ostrovsky, Leila in The Screens by Jean Genet, Martha in The Nest by Franz Xavier Kroetz, Martirio in The House of Bernarda Alba by Lorca, Natasha in Three Sisters by Chekhov, Queen of Sheba in The Queen of Sheba by Samy Grunman, Rea in Romulus the Great by Friedrich Dürrenmatt, Sara in Apples from the Desert by Savion Liebrecht, Sofya in Wild Honey by Chekhov, The Housekeeper in Doña Rosita by Lorca, The Second in Family by Ravid Davara, The Sewer-keeper's Apprentice in Beheading by Hanoch Levin, Ursula in The Fossil: Scenes from the Heroic Life of the Middle Classes by Carl Sternheim, Wendla in Spring Awakening: Tragedy of Childhood by Frank Wedekind, Yonit in The Murder of Pierrot by Eran Baniel, Zippora Aharonovitz in Devorah Baron by Yehudit Katzir.

Neumann acted in several Israeli films, such at the trilogy by Assi Dayan: Life According to Agfa (1992), An Electric Blanket named Moshe (1995) and The 92 Minutes of Mr. Baum (1997); and the films Sweet Mud (2006), HaAsonot Shel Nina (2003), Berlin-Yerushalaim (1989) and as Mary in Jesus (1979).

Neumann received the Israeli Theatre Award for the best supporting actress in 2006, for her part in Apples from the Desert.

== Personal life ==
Neumann lived in Tel Aviv with her partner Orna Lin
