= Gideon Mer =

Israeli scientist (1894–1961)

- גדעון מר
- Gideon Mer with assistant, 1955
- Born: 1894; Panevėžys, Ponevezhsky Uyezd, Kovno Governorate, Russian Empire (now Lithuania)
- Died: March 22, 1961 (aged 67); Rosh Pinna, Israel
- Citizenship: Israeli
- Education: Studied medicine in France
- Occupations: Scientist, malariologist
- Employer(s): Hebrew University of Jerusalem, Ministry of Health (Israel)
- Known for: Eradication of malaria
- Title: Chief Malaria Adviser to the Ministry of Health (Israel)
- Children: Arna Mer-Khamis
- Relatives: Juliano Mer-Khamis (grandson)

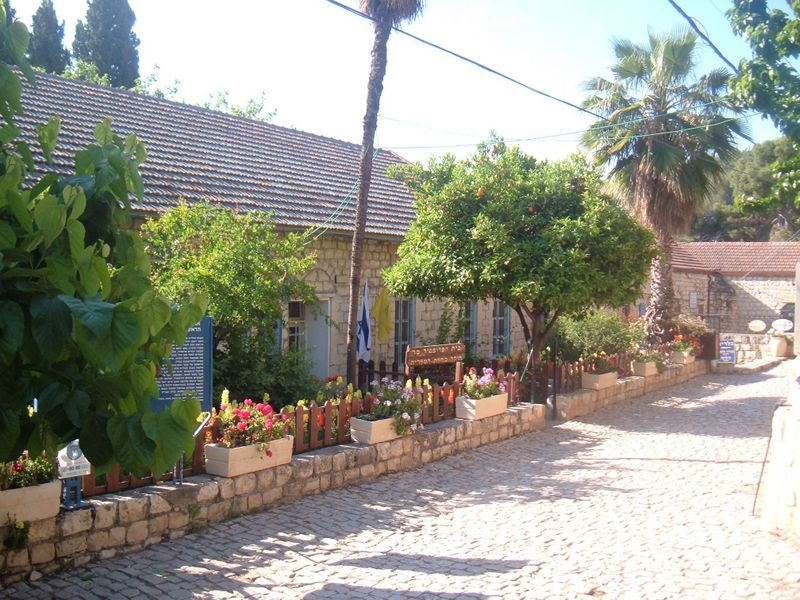
Gideon Mer's house in Rosh Pinna.

Gideon Mer (Hebrew: גדעון מר; 1894, Panevėžys - 22 March 1961 Rosh Pinna) was an Israeli scientist whose work was mostly concerned with the eradication of malaria. He was the father of Arna Mer-Khamis and the grandfather of Juliano Mer-Khamis.

== Biography ==
Gideon Mer was born in Lithuania, then part of Imperial Russia. He studied medicine in France. He immigrated to Palestine in 1914. During World War I, he was a medical officer in the Jewish Legion, a unit of the British Army, and served at Gallipoli, in Palestine, Syria, and Turkey. After the war he returned to Rosh Pinna, a Jewish settlement in the north of Palestine, and his laboratory there eventually became a research station for the study of the bionomics of mosquitoes and methods of malaria control.

== Scientific career ==
With the opening of the Hebrew University of Jerusalem he joined the Department of Preventive Medicine. In 1927 Israel Jacob Kligler founded the "Malaria Research Station" of the Hebrew University in Rosh Pina, where pioneering field work was carried out relating to the eradication of malaria. Two years later he appointed Dr. Gideon Mer as the station manager and together they published a series of articles on malaria.

During World War II, Mer became a malaria adviser to Middle East Command. From 1939 to 1941 he conducted training courses for British and Australian medical personnel on fighting malaria and other tropical diseases. In 1941 Mer enlisted in the British Army and served as a medical officer, reaching the rank of Lieutenant Colonel. From 1941 to 1943 he headed the anti-malaria laboratory in Iraq and Iran. In 1943 he was transferred to South Asia to head Malaria Field Laboratory No. 1 in combating incidents of malaria among Allied troops participating in the Burma campaign. He was discharged from the British Army in 1946. During the 1948 Arab-Israeli War, he served in the Israel Defense Forces. He was initially a combat physician before joining the core staff of the IDF Medical Service. After the Medical Service became the Medical Corps, he became head of preventive medicine. He left the IDF in 1951.

Mer subsequently became chief malaria adviser to the Ministry of Health in Israel, of which he was acting director in 1956 and 1957. He also served as chairman of the Department of Preventive Medicine at the Hebrew University of Jerusalem. As malaria was brought under control Professor Mer investigated the control of other insects, particularly the horse-fly, and the Rosh Pinna research station undertook the testing of insecticides and the training of scientists.

== See also ==
- Anopheles
- Health care in Israel
- Israel Jacob Kligler, colleague and founder of the Malaria Research Station in Rosh Pinna where he appointed Mer as station manager
- Juliano Mer-Khamis
- Science and technology in Israel
