= The Freedom Theatre =

Cultural center in Jenin, West Bank, Palestine

Coordinates: 32.4634°N 35.2872°E

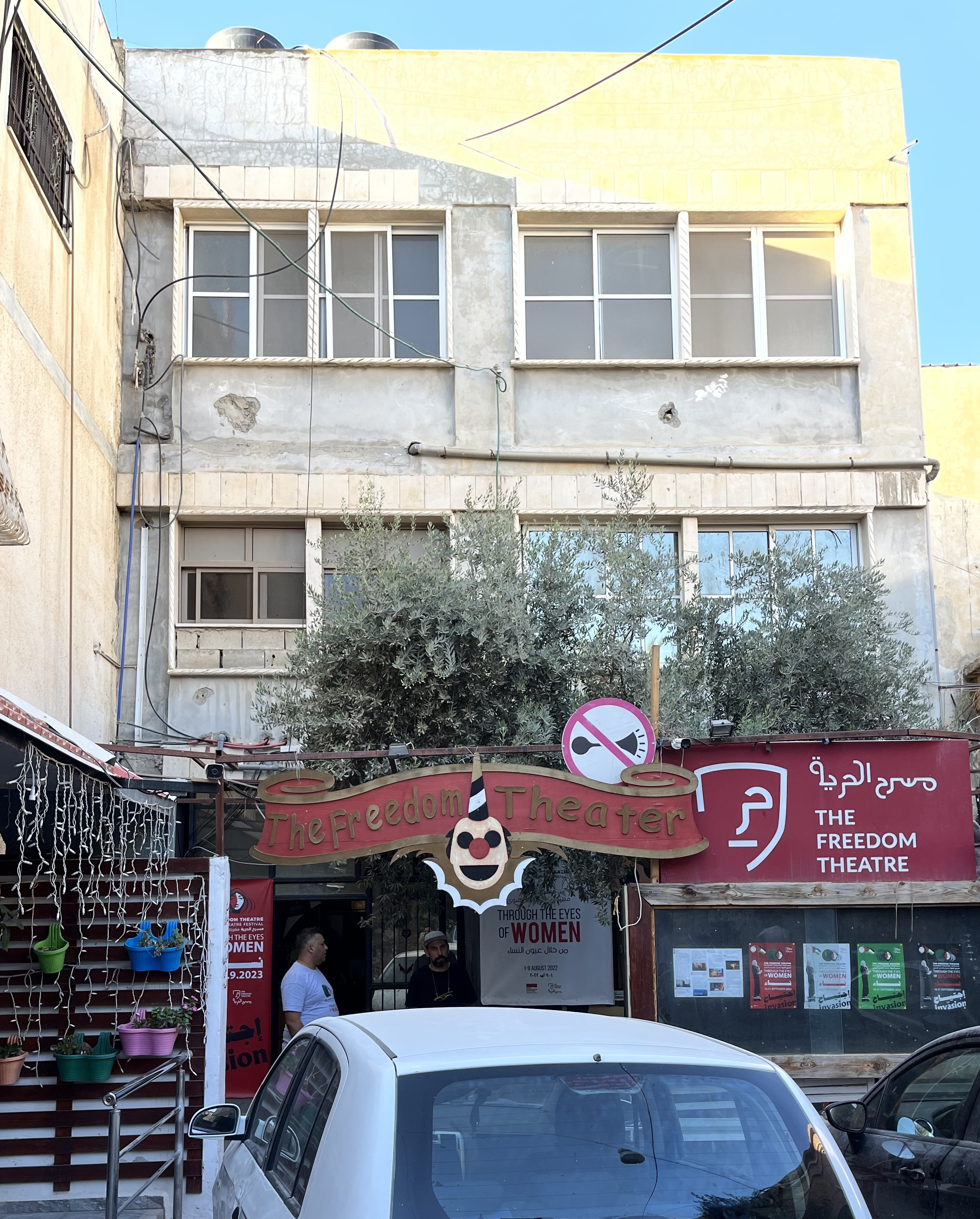
Entrance of The Freedom Theatre at the Jenin refugee camp, in the city of Jenin, Palestine

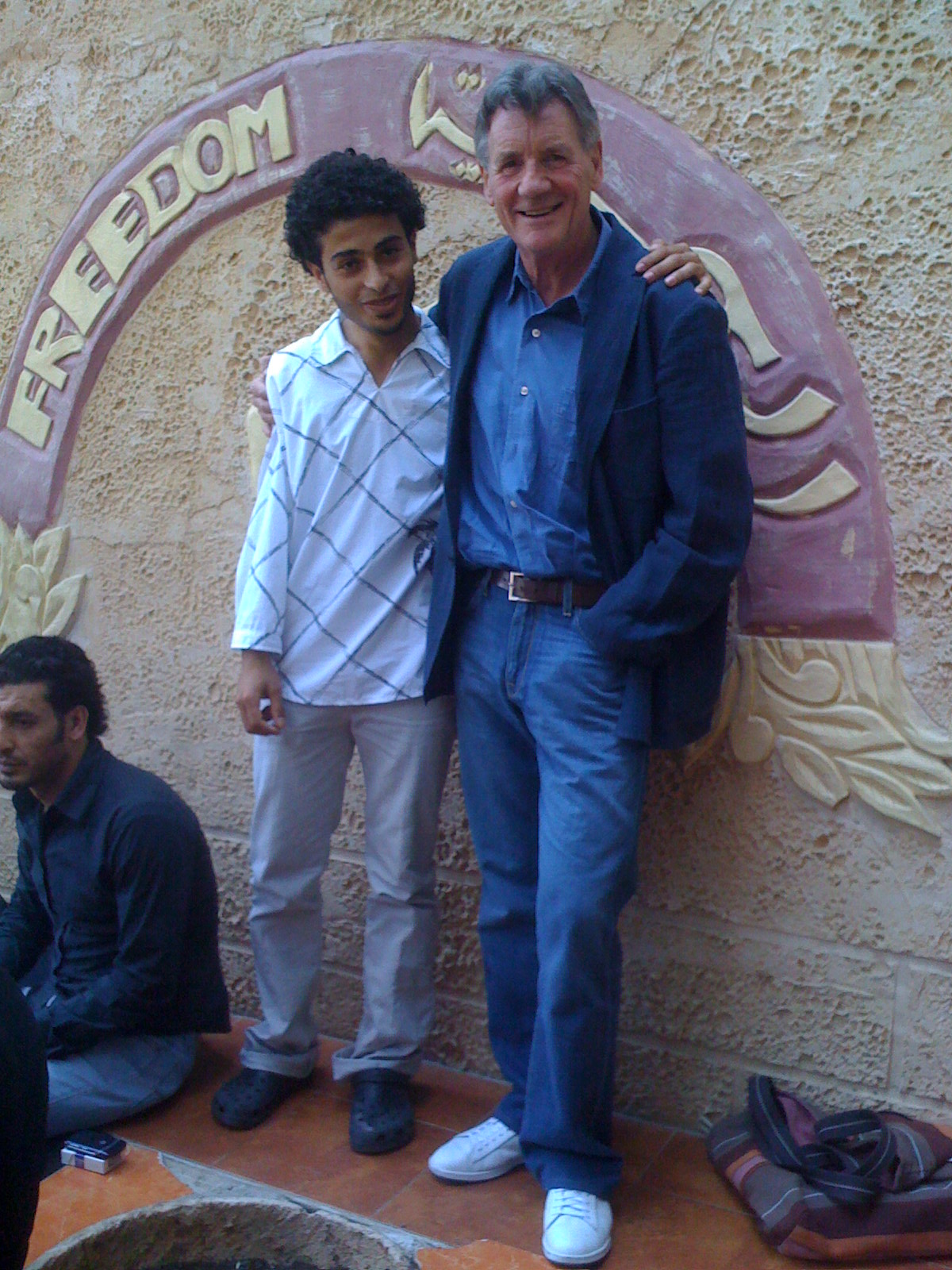
Michael Palin at the Freedom Theatre in 2009.

The Freedom Theatre (Arabic: مسرح الحرية) is a community-based theatre and cultural center in the Jenin refugee camp, in Jenin, in the northern part of the West Bank, Palestine.

Established in 2006, the theatre aims to generate cultural resistance through the fields of popular culture and art as a catalyst for social change in the occupied Palestinian territories. The theatre's goals are to "develop a vibrant and creative artistic community [that] empowers children and young adults to express themselves freely and equally through art [while] emphasizing professionalism and innovation." The theatre teaches courses in film, photography, creative writing, and theatre.

== Background ==
The Freedom Theatre is located in the Jenin refugee camp, which was established in 1953 in the municipal boundaries of the city of Jenin to house residents from the Carmel region of Haifa after the founding of the State of Israel in 1948. The theatre was inspired by Care and Learning, a project established during the First Intifada in response to the chronic fear, depression, and post-traumatic stress disorder experienced by children in the Jenin refugee camp as a result of the violence of the uprising. Arna Mer Khamis, an Israeli political and human rights activist, created the project to support the education of children in the West Bank. In the 1980s, Mer Khamis established several educational centers in the Jenin refugee camp, one of which was a small community theatre called "Stone Theatre."

== History ==
Located on the top floor of a local family house, the theatre was destroyed by an Israeli bulldozer during the 2002 Battle of Jenin resulting in the deaths of several of Mer Khamis' students.

Years later, Zakaria Zubeidi, a former student of the Stone Theatre, contacted Mer Khamis' son, Juliano Mer Khamis and suggested that they set up a drama project for the new generation of young people. Joined by Swedish activist Jonatan Stanczak, they opened the Freedom Theatre in 2006 as a venue to "join the Palestinian people in their struggle for liberation with poetry, music, theatre, cameras." According to Juliano Mer Khamis, the goal of the theatre is to create an artistic movement dedicated to eradicating discrimination and violence. He explains the theatre's mission within the Palestinian resistance movement by stating:

We are not trying to heal their violence. We try to challenge it into more productive ways. And more productive ways are not an alternative to resistance. What we are doing in the theatre is not trying to be a replacement or an alternative to the resistance of the Palestinians in the struggle for liberation, just the opposite. This must be clear.

The theatre uses drama, role-playing, music, dance, and art to help students express their frustrations and act out their everyday struggles.

=== Juliano Mer Khamis ===
On 4 April 2011, Juliano Mer Khamis was killed by a masked gunman near the Freedom Theatre and was pronounced dead en route to the hospital. The murder remains unsolved despite being investigated by four separate authorities: the Israeli police, the Palestinian police, the Israel Defense Forces (IDF), and Shin Bet. Speculation over the motivation behind his death has garnered media attention at the local and international level generating several theories as to the identity of the murderer.

Mer Khamis was not always viewed favourably by Palestinians or Israelis. Some Palestinian conservatives considered his liberal views corrupted youth in the camp, while some right-wing Israelis saw him as a traitor and an agent of Palestinian resistance. However, he believed that his work in the theatre was a means of implementing and teaching universal values of freedom that were separate from any political agenda. Within the theatre, Mer Khamis' legacy continues through his students, audiences, and admirers. Recently the theatre's youth acting group wrote and performed an original play called Stolen Dreams an homage to his legacy as a "symbol of culture."

=== 2023 IDF Raid ===
During the Gaza war, the Freedom Theatre was the target of Israeli forces. On 12 and 13 December 2023, the theatre was ransacked by the IDF and vandalized with graffiti of the Star of David. Three employees, including the theatre's artistic director, general manager, and a recent graduate of the performing arts school were arrested by Israeli soldiers.

== Organization's programs ==
The theatre offers youth within the camp an introduction to theatre and acting through a drama workshop program. It also offers a three-year professional educational program in theatre, with a focus on acting. The program familiarizes students with several methods and approaches of acting from around the world and prepares them for a future career in the performing arts. According to Juliano Mer Khamis, the organization had no intention of creating a professional school and initially intended to use drama as a tool for overcoming the emotional and psychological trauma of occupation. The drama therapy program was meant to encourage students to share their experiences and face their issues with trained practitioners. Currently, the drama therapy program explores various pedagogical approaches to applied drama including theatre of the oppressed, playback theatre, drama therapy, psychodrama, therapeutic spiral model, drama in education and sociodrama.

== Theatrical productions ==
The Freedom Theatre produced several adaptations of famous literary works such as George Orwell's Animal Farm (2009), Ghassan Kanafani's Men in the Sun (2010), and Lewis Carroll's Alice in Wonderland (2011). The plays are often a reflection, critique, and realistic portrayal of Palestinian society and occupation. The theatre has also produced several original plays such as Fragments of Palestine, Sho Kman (what else?), and Stolen Dreams.

In 2013, the theatre toured several U.S. college campuses performing an adaptation of the South African anti-apartheid play The Island. Inspired by a true story, the play takes place in a prison cell and tells the story of two cellmates, one of whom is soon to be released while the other is serving a life sentence. During the day, the two engage in mind-numbing labor while at night they rehearse for a performance of Sophocles' Antigone. The Island explores themes of occupation, apartheid, freedom, and brotherhood and has been described as a "testament to the resiliency of the human heart." It questions obedience, the established order, and notions of guilt and punishment. According to the Freedom Theatre, the production "reflects the experiences of Palestinian political prisoners and the abuses within the Israeli prison system." The play was performed to sold-out audiences at the University of Connecticut, Brown, and Georgetown and the New York Theatre Workshop. In addition to the U.S., the play has been performed in Sweden and Brazil.

== Productions ==
Year	Title
2007	To Be or Not to Be
2008	The Journey
2009	The Magic Flute
2009	Animal Farm
2009	Fragments of Palestine
2010	Men in the Sun
2011	Alice in Wonderland
2011	While Waiting
2011	Sho Kaman?-What else?
2012	The Caretaker
2012	Stolen Dreams
2013	The Island
2013	Suicide Note from Palestine
2013	Lost Land
2014	Magic Note
2015	The Siege
