= Orna Lin =

Israeli lawyer (born 1956)

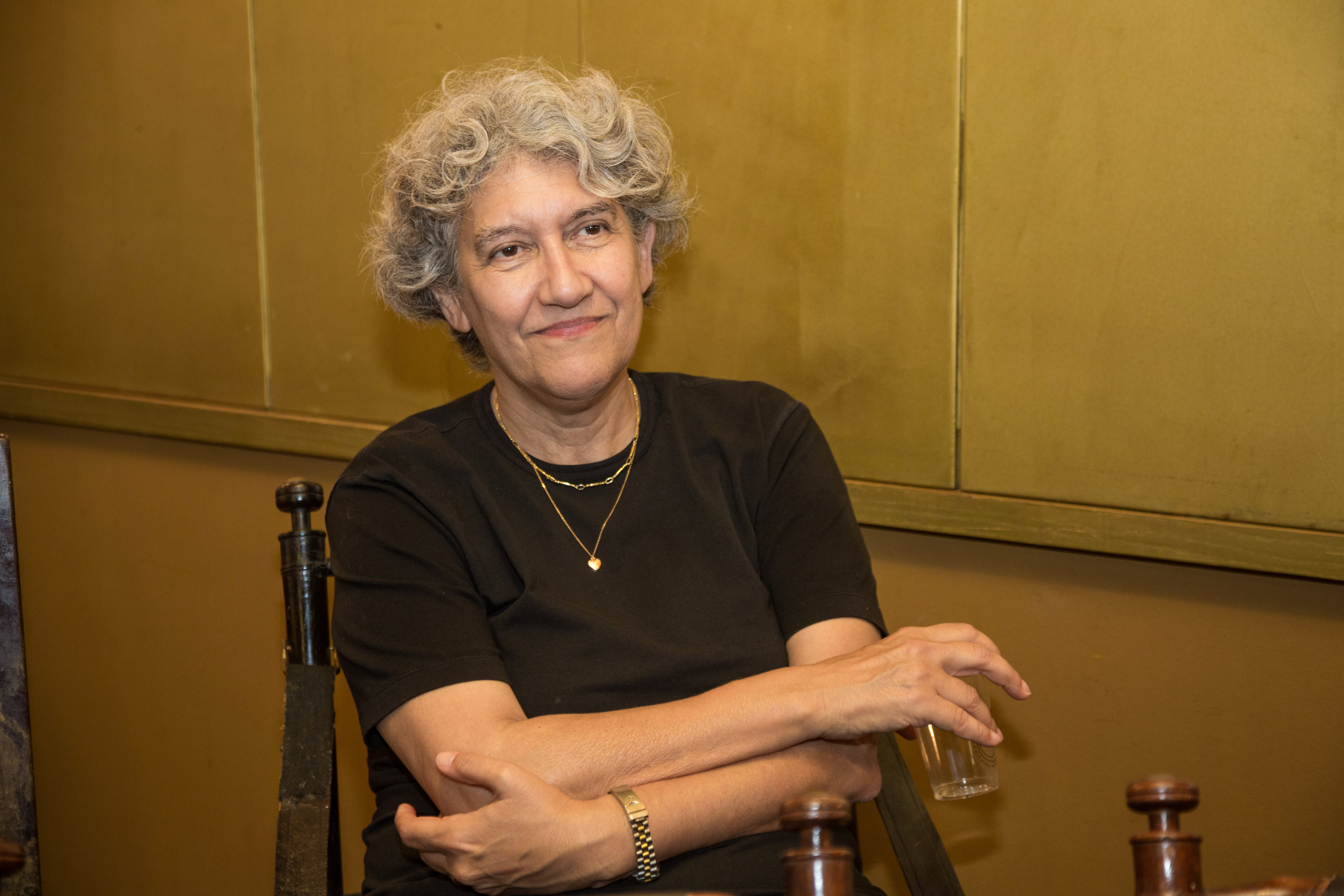
Orna Lin, 2017

Orna Lin (Hebrew: ארנה לין; born 1956) is the owner of a private law firm, Orna Lin & Co. and a leading labor lawyer in Israel.

== Biography ==
Orna Lin is the daughter of former Israeli Knesset member Amnon Lin and granddaughter of Haifa's first Jewish mayor, Abba Hushi. She is a graduate of the Hebrew University of Jerusalem.

== Legal career ==
Lin has been a member of the Israeli Bar since 1981. She was a partner at M. Seligman & Co., one of the largest law firms in Israel. In 1999-2003, she headed the Tel Aviv Bar Association, the first woman to serve in this position.

She is chairperson of the Israel Bar Association Council, also the first woman to hold this post. She lectures in labor law at Tel Aviv University.

=== Personal life ===
She lives in Tel Aviv together with her partner Rivka Neumann

== See also ==
- Women of Israel
