= Arna's Children =

2004 Dutch-Israeli documentary film

- Theatrical release poster
- Directed by: Juliano Mer Khamis; Danniel Danniel
- Produced by: Osnat Trabelsi; Pieter van Huystee
- Release date: April 20, 2004 (One World Film Festival)
- Running time: 84 minutes
- Countries: Israel; Netherlands
- Languages: Arabic; Hebrew

Arna's Children is a 2004 Dutch-Israeli documentary film directed by Juliano Mer Khamis and Danniel Danniel. The film's story revolves around a children's theater group in Jenin in the Palestinian territories established by Arna Mer-Khamis, the director's mother, an Israeli Jewish political and human rights activist.

The film portrays the lives of Arna Mer-Khamis and the children members of the theater including Ala el-Sabagr, Zakaria Zubeidi, Daud Zubeidi, Majdi Shadi, Haifa Staiti, Nidal Swetti, Yussef Swetti, Mahmoud Kaneri, Khairia Fakhri and Ashraf Abu-Alheji.

The film won "Best Documentary Feature" in the 2004 Tribeca Film Festival.

== Synopsis ==
The film combines footage from Arna Mer-Khamis's youth theatre and education activities in Jenin in the 1990s with footage and interviews from the Second Intifada. Of the ten former theater children, several would go on to play leading roles in the 2002 Battle of Jenin or otherwise participated in fighting.

Two of the former theatre children, Yussef and Nidal, committed a suicide attack in Hadera in 2001, murdering four civilians. A further two of the theatre children, Ala and Ashraf, were killed fighting in Jenin in 2002. Footage of them as children, engaging in the theatre and expressing their emotions and hopes, is abruptly interspersed with footage of them as adults taking up arms, of the aftermath of the attack in Hadera, and of their funerals, as well as interviews with family members and friends.
