= Juliano Mer-Khamis =

Palestinian-Israeli actor

- ג'וליאנו מר ח'מיס
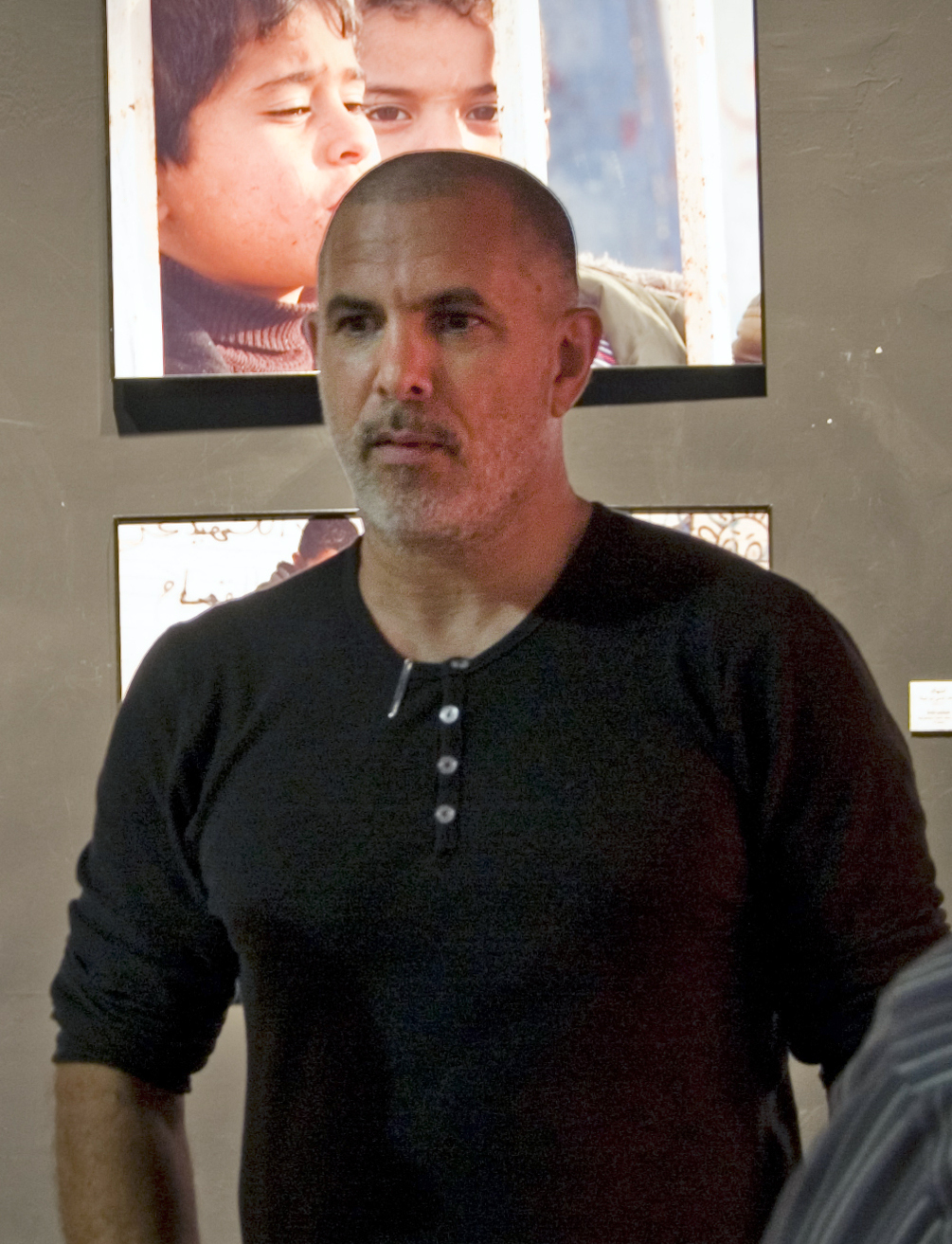
- Mer-Khamis in 2010
- Born: Juliano Khamis; 29 May 1958; Nazareth, Israel
- Died: 4 April 2011 (aged 52); Jenin, West Bank
- Cause of death: Assassination
- Resting place: Kibbutz Ramot Menashe, Israel
- Occupations: Actor, director, activist
- Years active: 1984–2011
- Spouse(s): Mishmesh Uri (1 child); Jenny Nyman (?–2011; his death; 3 children)

Juliano Mer-Khamis (Hebrew: ג'וליאנו מר ח'מיס; Arabic: جوليانو مير خميس; born Juliano Khamis; 29 May 1958 – 4 April 2011) was an Israeli–Palestinian actor, director, filmmaker, and political activist of Jewish and Palestinian Eastern Orthodox Christian parentage. On 4 April 2011, he was assassinated by a masked gunman in the city of Jenin, where he had established The Freedom Theatre.

== Biography ==
Juliano Khamis (later Mer-Khamis) was born in Nazareth, the son of Arna Mer-Khamis, a former Palmach combatant who had turned communist and joined the Maki party on experiencing disenchantment with Zionism after having participated in operations to drive Bedouin inhabitants out of parts of the Negev, and Saliba Khamis, an Israeli Arab of Eastern Orthodox Palestinian Christian descent who was an intellectual as well as one of the leaders of the Israeli Communist Party in the 1950s. He was called Sputnik Hamis at birth. He had two brothers, Spartacus and Abir. His maternal grandfather was Gideon Mer, a scientist who pioneered the study of malaria during the British Mandate. His father abandoned their household when he was 10 years old. He attended school in Haifa. His cousin is Palestinian hip-hop singer Shadia Mansour.

Mer-Khamis' first marriage was to Mishmesh Uri, with whom he had a daughter. At the time of his death, Mer-Khamis was married to Jenny Nyman, a Finnish woman who did administrative and fundraising work for the Jenin theater. They had three sons. Khamis saw the birth of one son, but was killed while his wife was pregnant with their twins. She gave birth to the twins a month after his death, and moved to Haifa to raise them.

== Service in the IDF ==
Mer-Khamis served in the Israel Defense Forces as a combat soldier in the Paratroopers Brigade. He was a volunteer, since the army did not send him his draft papers, and he was eager to fight for his country. He adopted his maternal surname, Mer, dropping the surname Khamis which identified him as an Arab and had caused him problems among fellow Jews. While his mother was supportive of his enlistment, his father opposed it on grounds that the IDF was a "fascist institution". Mer-Khamis didn't disagree, but countered that, 'I must see with my own eyes that they are really fascist'. He was eventually stationed in Jenin. According to him, one of his tasks was to carry a weapons bag and if someone was killed by accident, a weapon would be left on the corpse. Mer-Khamis said that while his squad was engaged in night-time firing practice they shot a shoulder missile at a donkey, accidentally killing a young girl seated on it. Mer-Khamis said that a load of explosives were left on the donkey to cover up the incident. He recalls beating up Palestinian protestors after they refused to disperse. When asked why, he recalled: "I wanted to be on one side. I wanted to be with somebody. Because I felt like nobody."

According to one version, at one point he refused to obey his commanding officer's order to frisk an elderly man, punching the former instead, and spent several months in prison. His release was won by the direct intervention of Isser Harel, who was his mother's cousin. According to another version, published by the New York Times, at a checkpoint where he was assigned to search Arabs' cars near the West Bank city of Jenin, Mer recognized a car passing from Nazareth as belonging to his father's relatives. This recognition triggered an act of defiance where he discarded his weapon and decided to abandon his post, declaring his intent to go home. This act of desertion led to a year of repeated incarcerations and time spent in psychiatric institutions.

== Theatre interest, travel and return ==
On his release from the stockade, he enrolled in acting school, and discovered his abilities in that field. He made an appearance in The Little Drummer Girl, a film which deals with Palestinian terrorism. In 1987 he spent a year in the Philippines, consuming hallucinogenic mushrooms and talking to monkeys. It was there that he felt, according to a later declaration, that he had shaken off all identities. On his return, he lived as a beachcomber in Tel Aviv. He protested against Israel's response to the First Intifada by stripping himself and walking about covered in fake blood. Mishmish Or, an Israeli Jew of Turkish paternal and Egyptian maternal descent, picked him up off the sidewalks and gave him shelter. The two would eventually have a daughter together, Milay. In the meantime his mother Arna set up a children's center to teach over 1500 children in the Jenin camp and asked her son to join her there to teach drama therapy.

When the Second Intifada broke out, two of his former students, Yusuf Sweitat and Nidal al-Jabali, became suicide bombers in October 2001 at Hadera. Two weeks earlier, a girl whom Sweitat had salvaged from a school classroom that had just been bombed by the IDF died as he carried her to the hospital. Hearing the news, Mer-Khamis returned to Jenin a month after the Battle of Jenin had begun. His host was a former student, Ala’a Sabbagh, then aged 22, leader of Jenin's Al-Aqsa Martyrs Brigade, and he spent several months on patrol with men on Israel's hit list, and in hideouts, with Sabbagh and Zakaria Zubeidi, whose mother had been killed in April 2002 by an Israeli sniper who perhaps mistook her for her son Tata, who was also subsequently shot dead an hour later. He made a film on the period, Arna's Children, released in 2004.

Outside of the theater he devoted himself to allaying everyday problems: driving pregnant women to Israeli hospitals, or Jenin's children to Haifa's beaches, or providing medicines and food.

In a 2009 interview with Israel Army Radio, Mer-Khamis said of his background: "I am 100 percent Palestinian and 100 percent Jewish."

Mer-Khamis was married to Jenny Nyman, a Finnish activist he met in Haifa in May 2006. They had a son, Jay, and were expecting the birth of twins at the time of his death.

The theater he founded thrives, under the general management of Swedish-Israeli Jonathan Stanczyk, with actor Nabil al-Raee as artistic director.

== Film and acting career ==
Mer-Khamis's first film, The Little Drummer Girl, was an American thriller from 1984 directed by George Roy Hill and starring Diane Keaton, which dealt with the Israeli-Arab conflict. He starred in Avi Nesher's film, Za'am V'Tehilah (1985). Later he appeared in such Israeli films as 51 Bar (1985), Wedding in Galilee (1987), Tel Aviv Stories (1992), Zohar (1993), Under the Domim Tree (1994), and Overture 1812 (1997). He appeared in several films by Amos Gitai: Kedma, Esther (1986) and Kippur (2000).

In 2002, Mer-Khamis was nominated for the Ophir Award for Best Actor for his role in Kedma. One of the last films in which he appeared was the Palestinian film Salt of this Sea (2008), which was nominated for an Academy Award for Best Foreign Language Film.

He performed on stage with Beit Lessin Theater and Habima Theatre. In 2003, he produced and directed his first documentary film, Arna's Children, together with Danniel Danniel. The film is about his mother's work to establish a children's theatre group in Jenin during the 1980s.

In 2011 he joined the faculty of the Academy of Performing Arts, Tel Aviv, where he taught acting until his assassination.

In 2006, following a wave of international support which was followed by his film, Mer-Khamis opened a community theater for children and adults in Jenin, called The Freedom Theatre.

=== The Freedom Theatre ===
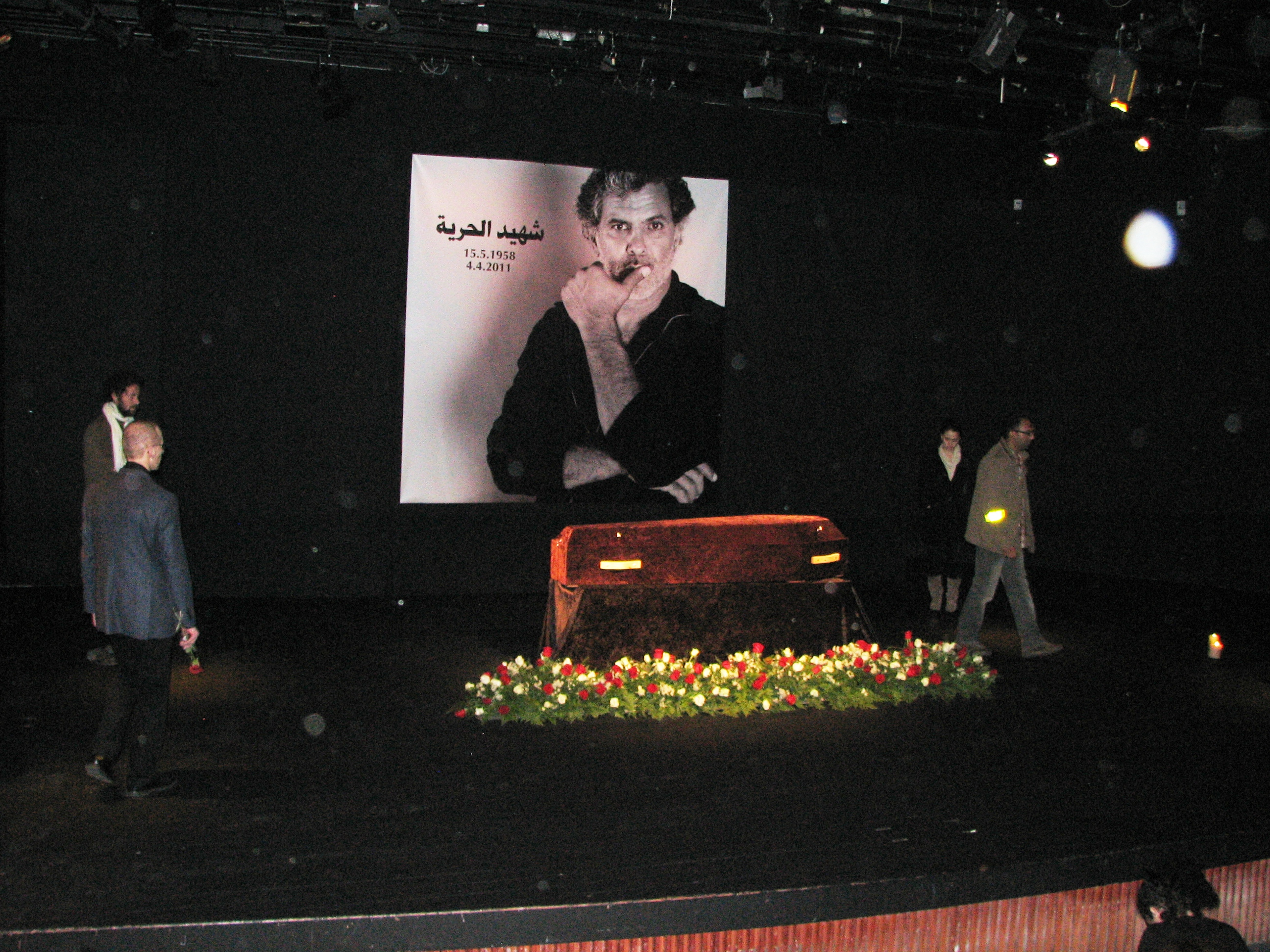
Mer-Khamis lying in state at the al-Midan Theater, Haifa. The Arabic script on his picture reads shaheed al-ḥuriya, which means "martyr for freedom".

In 2006, Mer-Khamis established The Freedom Theatre along with Zakaria Zubeidi, a former military leader of the Jenin Al-Aqsa Martyrs' Brigades, Jonatan Stanczak, a Swedish-Israeli activist, and Dror Feiler, a Swedish-Israeli artist. The Freedom Theatre is a community theatre that provides opportunities for the children and youth of the Jenin Refugee Camp by developing skills, self-knowledge and confidence and using the creative process as a model for social change.

== Assassination ==
On 4 April 2011, Mer-Khamis was shot by masked gunmen while leaving the theater he had founded in Jenin. He had just started to drive away in his Citroën, with his baby son Jay on his lap, when a masked gunman emerged from a nearby alley and asked him to stop. The babysitter with them advised him to drive on, but he stopped, and was shot five times. He was rushed to the Jenin Hospital, where he was pronounced dead after his arrival. Palestinian National Authority Prime Minister Salam Fayyad condemned the killing, saying that "We cannot stand silent in the face of this ugly crime, it constitutes a grave violation that goes beyond all principles and human values and it contravenes with the customs and ethics of co-existence."

In an interview in 2008, Mer-Khamis had foreseen the circumstances of his murder, predicting jokingly that he would be killed by a "fucked-up Palestinian" for "corrupting the youth of Islam". After being identified by the babysitter in three separate lineups, Mujahed Qaniri, who hails from Jenin's refugee camp, was charged by Palestinian police with the murder. On 19 April 2011, Adnan Dameery, spokesperson for the Palestinian National Security Forces, reported DNA tests had exonerated the only detained suspect and that the murderer was still at large.

== Filmography ==
Year	Film	Role	Notes
1984	The Little Drummer Girl	Julio	
1985	Not Quite Paradise	Hassan, Terrorist	
1985	Za'am V'Tehilah	Edy "The Butcher"	
1985	Bar 51	Thomas	
1986	Esther	Haman	
1987	Wedding in Galilee (Urs al-Jalil)	Officer	
1989	Berlin-Yerushalaim	Menahme	
1993	Sipurei Tel-Aviv (Tel Aviv Stories)	Jeno	
1993	Zohar	Morris	
1993	Deadly Heroes	Ramon	
1994	Nothing to Lose	Antonio Valdez	
1994	Under the Domim Tree (Etz Hadomim Tafus)	Ariel	
1994	Yom Yom	Jules	
1995	Night Terrors	Mahmoud (as Juliano Mer)	
1997	Overture 1812		
2000	The Last Patrol	Jesus Carrera	
2000	Kippur	The Captain	
2002	Kedma	Moussa	
2003	Arna's Children	Himself	Won FIPRESCI Prize
2004	God's Sandbox (Tahara)	Nagim	Nominated for Best Actor
2008	Salt of this Sea	Hiking Leader	Palestinian submission for Oscar in "Best Foreign Language Film" category
2009	Hadutha Saghira	Israeli Soldier	
2010	Miral	Sheikh Saabah	

== Television and video ==
Year	Title	Role	Notes
1995	Hostages	Ali	Series
1992	Sweating Bullets	Melito	Series – played in "Don't Say Nothing Bad About My Baby" episode
1995	The Revolutionary	Centurion	Video
1996	The Revolutionary II	Centurion	Video
1998	Florentine	Remi	Series
2001	1000 Calories	Eitan Katz	TV movie
2006	Dijihad!	Omar	TV movie
