= Arna Mer-Khamis =

Israeli politician (1929–1995)

- ארנה מר ח'מיס
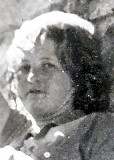
- Arna Mer-Khamis
- Born: Arna Mer; March 20, 1929; Rosh Pinna, Mandatory Palestine
- Died: February 15, 1995 (aged 65); Israel
- Citizenship: Israeli
- Education: Ben Shemen Youth Village
- Occupations: Political and human rights activist
- Organization(s): In the Defence of Children under Occupation/Care and Learning, Freedom Theatre
- Known for: Advocacy for Palestinian children's education and rights
- Notable work: Arna's Children (documentary by her son, Juliano Mer-Khamis)
- Political party: Maki
- Spouse: Saliba Khamis
- Children: 3, including Juliano Mer-Khamis
- Father: Gideon Mer
- Awards: Right Livelihood Award (1993)
- Website: Right Livelihood Award Speech

Arna Mer-Khamis (Hebrew: ארנה מר ח'מיס; 20 March 1929 – 15 February 1995) was an Israeli Jewish political and human rights activist. In 1993, she was awarded the Right Livelihood Award for "passionate commitment to the defence and education of the children of Palestine."

== Biography ==
Arna Mer-Khamis was born in 1929, in Rosh Pinna, at the time Mandate Palestine. Mer-Khamis's father was Gideon Mer, a Lithuanian-born Jewish scientist who pioneered the study of malaria during the British Mandate. She attended high school in Tiberias as well as Ben Shemen Youth Village, and was active in the Gordonia youth movement. Mer-Khamis fought with the Palmach and Israel Defense Forces during the 1948 Arab-Israeli War.

Mer-Khamis married Saliba Khamis, a Christian Arab and a prominent member of Maki. After marrying Khamis, they moved to Nazareth, where Mer-Khamis was arrested and imprisoned for two weeks due to entering the city without a permit. She and Khamis had three sons: Spartacus, Juliano (who adopted the name Juliano Mer-Khamis), and Abir. Juliano, an actor, filmmaker, and peace activist who was murdered in 2011, directed the film Arna's Children about Mer-Khamis's work with the Freedom Theatre.

== Political activism ==
Mer-Khamis was an active member of the Communist party in Israel. During the First Intifada, as part of a project to support the education of children in the West Bank, she established the organisation In the Defence of Children under Occupation/Care and Learning, and later established the Freedom Theatre in Jenin refugee camp.

== Awards ==
In 1993, Mer-Khamis was awarded the Right Livelihood Award. In her acceptance speech, Arna Mer-Khamis expressed her sympathy for Palestinian refugee children and their sufferings.
