= Shoshana Duer =

Israeli actress (1908–2000)

- שושנה דואר
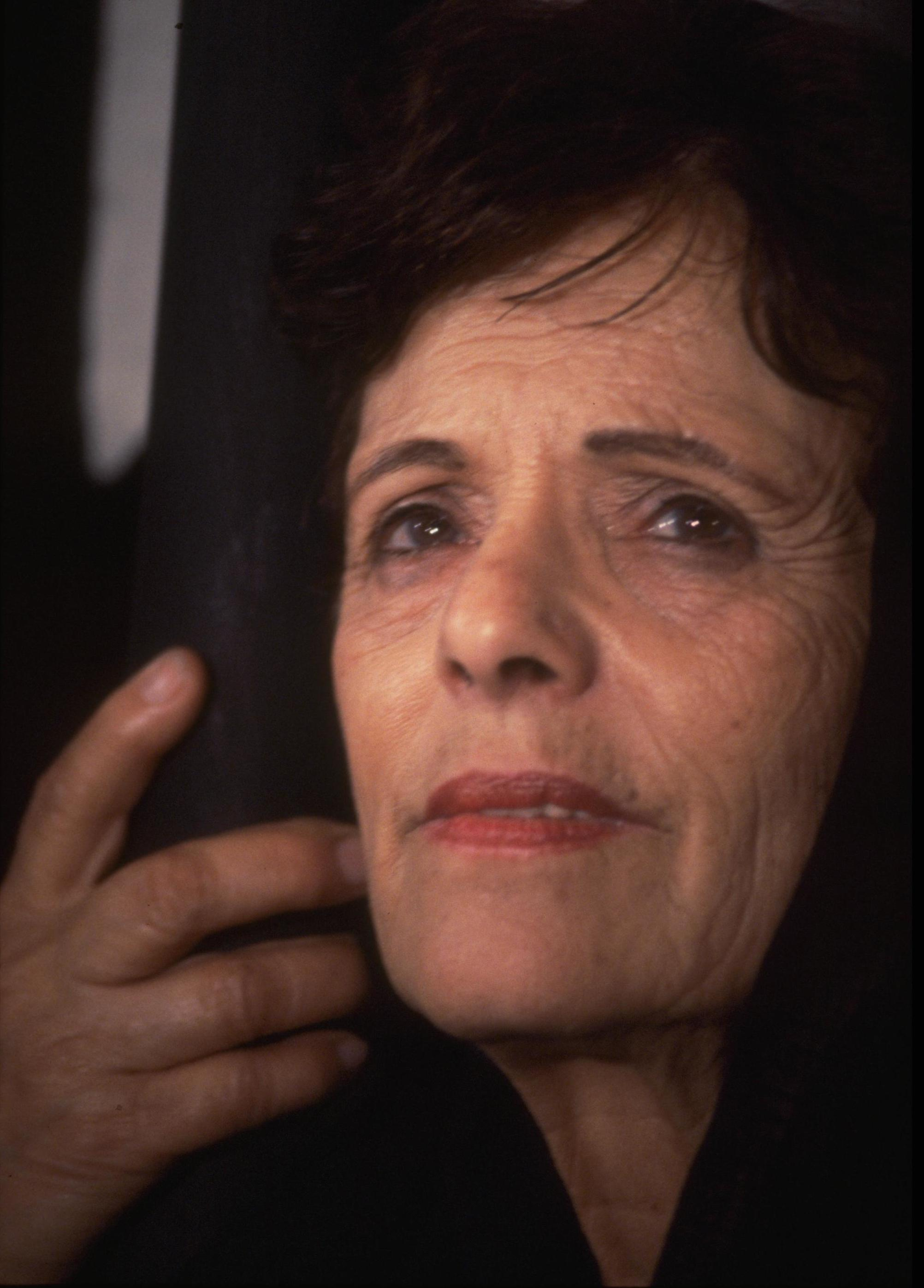
- Duer in 1980
- Born: 1908; Damascus, Ottoman Empire
- Died: 13 January 2000 (aged 92); Tel Aviv, Israel
- Occupation: Actress
- Years active: 1932–2000
- Children: 2

Shoshana Duer (Hebrew: שושנה דואר; 1908 – 13 January 2000) was an Israeli theatre and film actress.

== Biography ==
Duer was born in 1908 in Damascus. As a young girl, she performed in social events and plays within the Maccabi HaTzair youth movement.

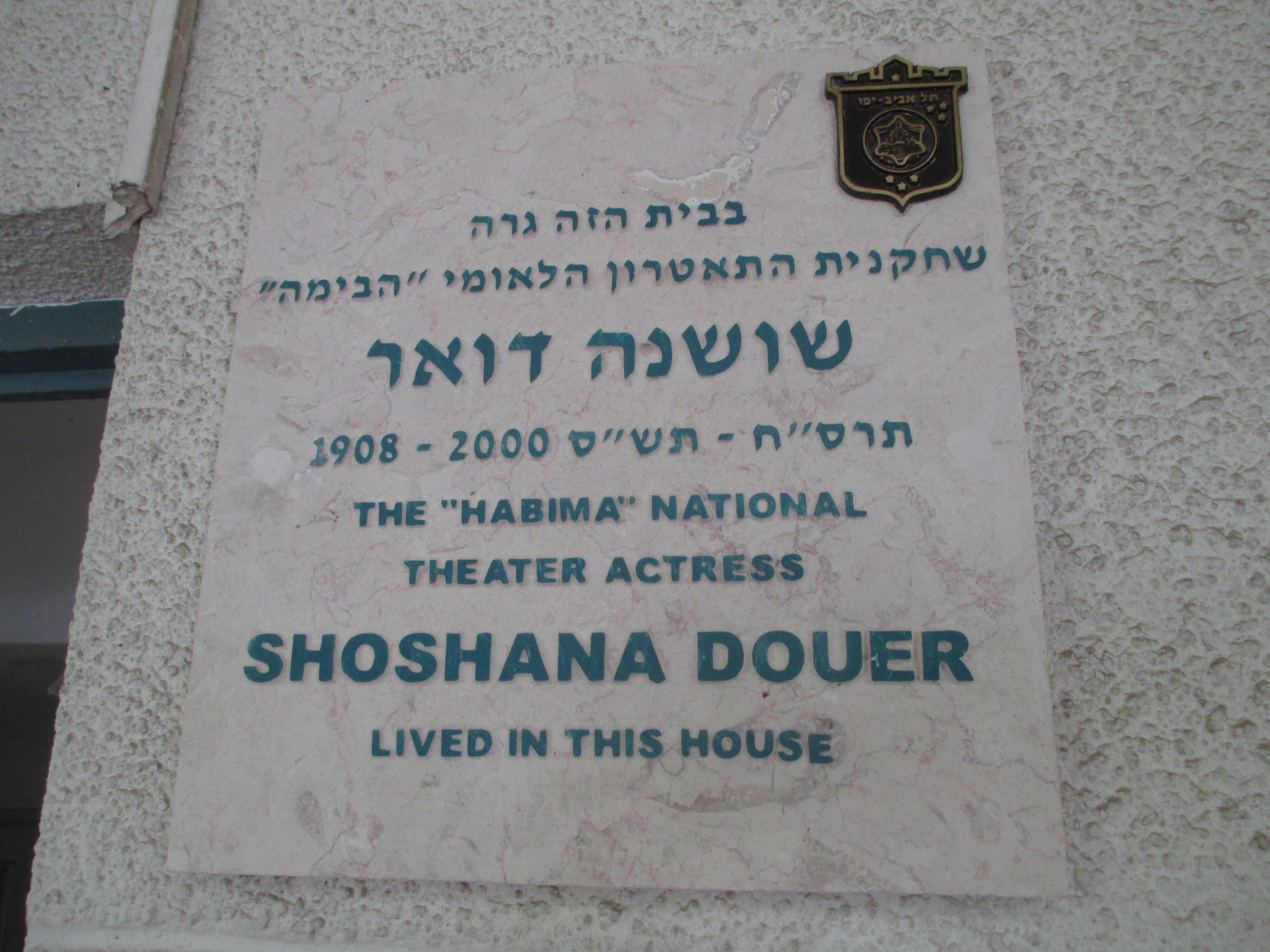

In 1925, she immigrated to Israel during the Fourth Aliyah and joined the dramatic studio of the HaNoar HaOved organization, under the direction of director Yitzhak Moshe Daniel, and later the acting studio of Habima, under the direction of Tzvi Friedland. In 1932 she was the first graduate to be accepted into Habima, and in 1947 she was admitted to Habima's acting collective. At Habima she performed in a number of plays including "The Marranos," "Oedipus Rex," "The Emperor's New Clothes," and others.

She played dozens of roles at Habima, most of them supporting parts. She also participated in radio dramas on Kol Yisrael.

== Filmographia ==
She appeared in several films:

- 1955 – Hill 24 Doesn't Answer – as a head nurse in a hospital
- 1962 – A Gang Like That – as Yosiniu's mother
- 1967 – Three Days and a Child – as Yael's mother
- 1973 – The Persuader Ltd.
- 1977 – The Garden – as Sarah
- 1978 – Little Shraga – as Shraga's mother
- 1982 – Right Under Your Nose – as Sami's mother
- 1995 – Lilosade – as grandmother

She also appeared in several television series:

- 1980 – Screen for Literature
- 1982 – Michel Ezra Safra and Sons – as Regina

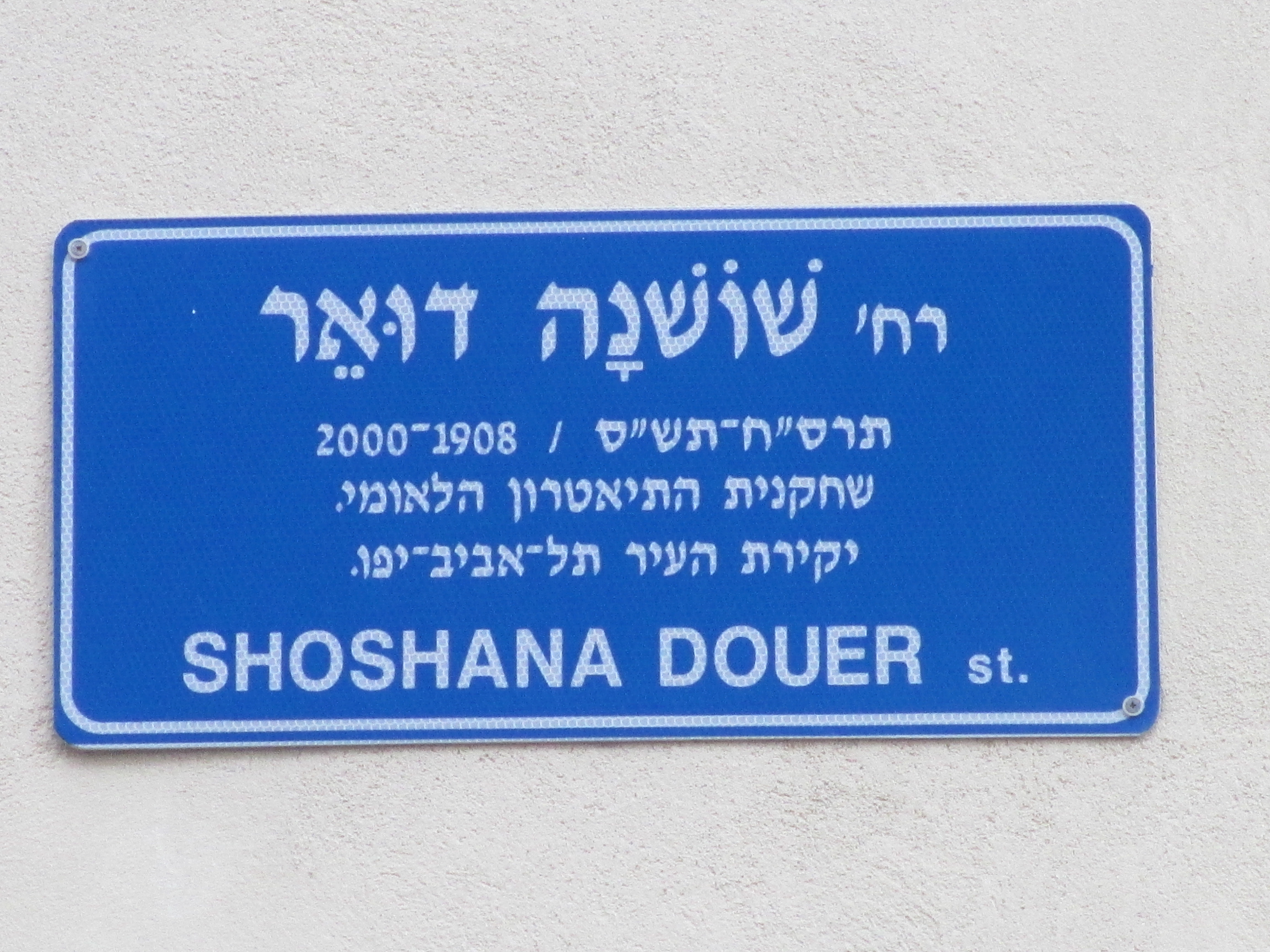
A street in Jaffa bears her name.

In 1995 she received the Tamara Robbins Prize for her many theater roles. In 1997 she was awarded the title of Honorary Citizen of Tel Aviv.

She was the mother of a son and a daughter.

Duer passed away in January 2000 at the age of 92. In July 2013, a memorial plaque was placed in her honor at the entrance to her home in Tel Aviv.

A street in Jaffa bears her name.
