= Tarik Kopty =

Arab-Israeli actor (1944–2022)

- طارق قبطي
- Born: 20 August 1944; Nazareth, Mandatory Palestine
- Died: 24 February 2022 (aged 77); Nazareth, Israel
- Occupation: Actor

Tarik Kopty (Arabic: طارق قبطي, Hebrew: טארק קובטי; 20 August 1944 – 24 February 2022) was an Arab-Israeli actor. He acted in multiple films which appeared at the Cannes Film Festival.

Kopty died in Nazareth on 24 February 2022, at the age of 77.

== Filmography ==
- The Barbecue People (2003)
- The Gospel According to God (2004)
- The Syrian Bride (2004)
- The Band's Visit (2007)
- The Little Traitor (2007)
- Lemon Tree (2008)
- Pillars of Smoke (Timrot Ashan) (2009)
- Man Without a Cell Phone (2010)
- Inheritance (2012)
- Zaytoun (2012)
- Omar (2013)
- Bethlehem (2013)
- A Borrowed Identity (2014)
