= Facets Multi-Media =

Facets Multi-Media, Inc.
- Company type: Private 501(c)(3) organization
- Industry: Media education Independent movie theater Video rental Motion-picture video distribution
- Founded: 1975
- Founder: Milos Stehlik
- Headquarters: 1517 West Fullerton Avenue, Chicago, Illinois, U.S.
- Key people: Karen Cardarelli (Director); Charles Coleman (Programmer)
- Divisions: Facets Cinematheque, Facets Film School, Facets Children's Programs, Chicago International Children's Film Festival, Facets Videotheque, Facets DVD Label
- Website: facets.org

Facets Multi-Media is a non-profit, 501(C)3 organization, and a media arts organization. Founded in 1975, its mission is to preserve, present, distribute, and educate about film. Besides its facilities at 1517 W. Fullerton Ave., Chicago, Illinois, Facets Multi-Media also runs Facets Video, one of the largest distributors of foreign film in the United States. Facets has been described as a “temple of great cinema” by film critic Roger Ebert and "a giant in the rarefied world of art-house films and cultural education."

== Facilities ==
Facets maintains facilities in Chicago, where it was founded by Milos Stehlik as a non-profit film organization. The brick-and-mortar space includes a single-screen movie theater (referred to as Facets Cinémathèque), which screens "interesting" independent films and "obscure" features. It also houses a video rental store that offers home delivery with over 65,000 titles, described as "a stunningly deep archive of every kind of experimental, avant-garde, foreign and children's film you could hope to find." There is also a non-accredited film school, consisting of classes for the general public.

== Programs ==
Facets runs the annual Chicago International Children's Film Festival, a Kids Film Camp for ages 7–14, Facets Film School for Chicago-area cinephiles, Facets Night School for cult film connoisseurs, and a Summer Film Institute for K-12 teachers.

== Facets Video ==
Facets is a nationally recognized conservator, publisher and distributor of films on DVD, including independent, art-house, classics, documentaries, and experimental films. Facets has distributed films by directors such as Bela Tarr, Jean-Luc Godard, Miloš Forman, Věra Chytilová, Amos Gitai, Alexander Kluge, Andrzej Zulawski, and Miklós Jancsó. Since the late 1980s, Facets has released over 800 films on VHS and DVD.
