= Danniel Danniel =

Danniel Danniel דניאל דניאל
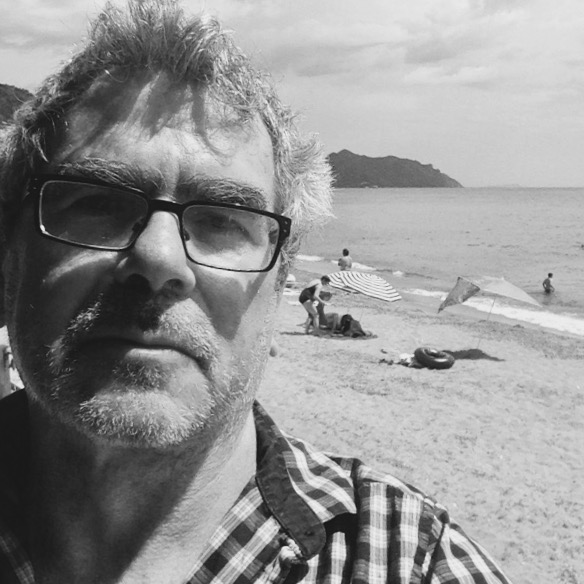
- Born: 1950; Haifa, Israel
- Died: May 4, 2017 (aged 67); Amsterdam, The Netherlands
- Occupation(s): Film director Screenwriter; Film editor

Danniel Danniel (Hebrew: דניאל דניאל; 1950-May 4, 2017) was an Israeli film director, screenwriter and film editor. He lived in the Netherlands since 1980. He died in the morning of 4 May 2017 in Amsterdam.

He graduated from the Netherlands Film and Television Academy (NFTVA) in 1981. His 1987 short film Ei won the Best International Fantasy Film Award.

He directed the 2003 documentary on the Palestinian conflict Arna's Children.

== Filmography ==
=== As director ===
- Meetings (1981)
- The Way to Paris (1982)
- Station (1985)
- Ei (1987). Won International Fantasy Film Award for best short film at the Fantasporto film festival (1989)
- Viaduc (1991)
- Tralievader (1995) (TV)
- Mykosch (1995)
- Winter '89 (1998)
- "Russen" (2000) TV Series (unknown episodes)
- De zaak Braun (2000) Short Television Drama
- Arna's Children (2003) Won FIPRESCI Prize at the Hot Docs Canadian International Documentary Festival (2004) and the Jury Award (shared with Juliano Mer-Khamis for Best Documentary Feature at the Tribeca Film Festival (2004)
- Sporen (2014) Won Jean Vigo Prize for Best Director, shared with Diego Gutiérrez, at the International Documentary Film Festival of Navarra Punto de Vista (2015)
- While Looking for the Devil (2016) In collaboration with Diego Gutiérrez

=== Film editor ===
- Krokodillen in Amsterdam (Crocodiles in Amsterdam) (1990)
- De Domeinen Ditvoorst (1992)
- Sarajevo Film Festival (Documentary short) (1993)
- Metaal en melancholie (1994)
- Jalan raya pos (1996)
- Mijn vader maakt foto's (1997)
- The Making of a New Empire (Documentary) (1999)
- Tussenland (TV)(2002)
- Golestan (Documentary) (2004)
- Forever (2006)
- De grote tovenaar (Documentary) 2006
- Talking Guitars (Documentary) 2007
- Izaline Calister: Lady Sings the Tambú (Documentary) 2007
- De werkelijkheid van Jan Vrijman (TV Movie documentary) 2007
- After the Rape (Documentary) 2008
- El olvido (Documentary) (2008)
- Later We Care (Documentary) 2009
- 900 Dagen (Documentary) 2011
- End and Beginning: Meeting Wislawa Szymborska (Documentary) 2011
- Daughters of Malakeh (Documentary) 2011
- Soldier on the Roof (2012)
- The House that Leo Built (Documentary) (post-production) (2012)
- De Kolonisten van Hebron (Documentary) (2012)
- Futures Past (Documentary) (2012/II)
- Parts of a Family (Documentary) (2012)
- UTAC - Tussen Kaapverdië en Rotterdam (Documentary) (2012)
- Sporen (Documentary) (2014)
- Floating Bodies (Documentary) (2014)
- Om de wereld in 50 concerten (Documentary)(2014)
- Little Angels (Documentary) (2015)
- Daan's Inheritance (Documentary) (2016)
- The Company you Keep (Documentary) (2017)
