= Some Prefer Cake =

Lesbian film festival Italy

- Location: Bologna
- Established: 2006; 20 years ago
- Website: someprefercakefestival.com

Some Prefer Cake is a lesbian and feminist film festival in Bologna, Italy. It was established in 2009 to celebrate the richness of lesbian international film.

== History ==
The festival was founded in 2006 by Luki Massa and Marta Bencich, who continued to direct and organize it, until 2014, when Massa became ill. She died in 2016. The Fuoricampo Lesbian Group, which had always been involved in the festival, reorganized with other key festival personnel to create the Luki Massa Association, and renewed the festival in 2017, which is now produced by the Comunicattive Association, and dedicated to Massa.

Some Prefer Cake is a political endeavor, dedicated to fighting fascism, racism, repression and violence, and supporting those who fight and "boycott the neoliberal and neofundamentalist systems of patriarchal power". The festival considers itself part of this fight, giving visibility to women's and rebel non-conforming lesbian's stories, in the struggle against heteronormativity, illness, loneliness, environmental destruction, and politically oppressive systems.

In addition to screening over 50 films depicting these stories in various genres, including narrative, short, documentary, animation, web series and experimental, the festival includes discussion and panels, art exhibits, social gatherings and a party. The festival takes place over 5 days, and hosts over 6000 attendees.

== Awards ==
The festival grants an audience awards, and also grants jury awards for the best films in the documentary, fiction and short film categories.

Year	Award	Category	Winner
2012	Audience	Best Narrative Feature	Thom Fitzgerald, Cloudburst
2012	Audience	Best Documentary	Zanele Muholi and Peter Goldsmid, A Difficult Love
2012	Audience	Best Short	Petra Clever, The Mermaids
2012	Jury	Best Narrative Feature	Aurora Guerrero, Mosquita y Mari
2012	Jury	Narrative Feature - Special Mention	Veronica Kedar, Joe + Belle
2012	Jury	Best Documentary	Zanele Muholi and Peter Goldsmid, A Difficult Love
2012	Jury	Documentary- Special Mention	Dagmar Schultz, Audre Lorde: The Berlin Years 1984 to 1992
2012	Jury	Best Short	Adiya Imri Orr, Tfarim (Stitches)
2012	Jury	Short - Special Mention	"Sirka" Capone, Dhé Lell World
2013	Audience	Best Narrative Feature	Margarita Albelo, Who's Afraid of Vagina Wolf
2013	Audience	Best Documentary	The Love Part of This
2013	Audience	Best Short	Re(l) episode 5, "Chain Reactions"
2013	Jury	Best Narrative Feature	Subarna Thapa, Soongava: Dance of the Orchids
2013	Jury	Best Documentary	Nocem Collado, Cartografia de la Soledad
2013	Jury	Best Short	Ipek Efe and Berna Kuculmez, Pardon! Kim, Ben mi?
2013	Jury	Short - Special Mention	Janella Lacson, The First Date
2014	Audience	Best Narrative Feature	Bruno Barreto, Reaching for the Moon
2014	Audience	Best Documentary	Pratibha Parmar, Alice Walker: Beauty in Truth
2014	Audience	Best Short	Jaime Maestro, Orbitas
2014	Jury	Best Narrative Feature	Madeleine Olnek, The Foxy Merkins
2014	Jury	Best Documentary	Esther Hoffenberg, Violette Leduc, la chasse à l'amour
2014	Jury	Documentary- Special Mention	Thembela Dick, Thokozani Football Club: Team Spirit
2014	Jury	Best Short	René Guerra and Juliana Vicente, O Olho eo Zarolho
2014	Jury	Short - Special Mention	Jaime Maestro, Orbitas
2017	Audience	Best Narrative Feature	Lisa Gornick, The Book of Gabrielle
2017	Audience	Best Documentary	Catherine Gund & Daresha Kyi, Chavela
2017	Audience	Best Short	Sarah Santamaria-Mertens, Blind Sex
2017	Audience	Best Web Series	10percento
2017	Jury	Best Narrative Feature	Lisa Gornick, The Book of Gabrielle
2017	Jury	Best Documentary	C. Fitz, Jewel’s Catch One
2017	Jury	Best Short	Valentina Pedicini, Era ieri
2018	Audience	Best Narrative Feature	Anchor and Hope by Carlos Marques-Marcet
2018	Audience	Best Documentary	The Passionate Pursuits of Angela Bowen by Jennifer Abod and Mary Duprey
2018	Audience	Best Short	A Great Ride by Deborah Craig and Veronica Deliz
2018	Jury	Best Narrative Feature	Anchor and Hope by Carlos Marques-Marcet
2018	Jury	Best Short	Fran This Summer by Mary Evangelista
2018	Jury	Special Mention	A Great Ride by Deborah Craig and Veronica Deliz
2018	Jury	Best Documentary	Silvana by Mika Gustafson, Olivia Kastebring & Christina Tsiobanel

== See also ==
- List of women's film festivals
- Women's cinema
- List of LGBT film festivals
