= Sivan Levy =

Israeli musical artist

Sivan Levy סִיוָן לֵּוִי
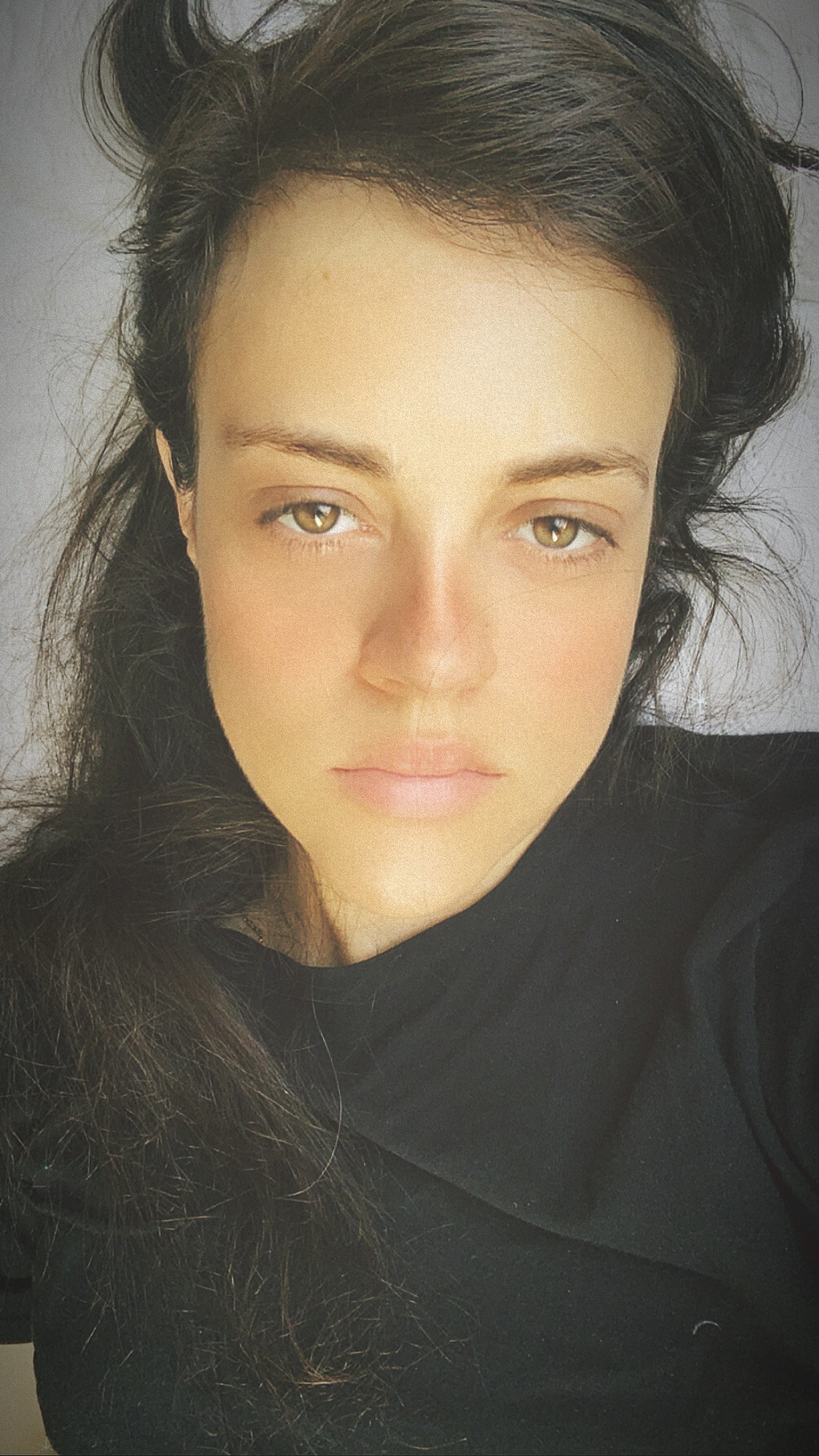

Background information
- Born: Sivan Levy; 4 June 1987 (age 39)
- Origin: Ramat Hasharon, Israel
- Genres: Dream Pop
- Label: unsigned

Sivan Levy (Hebrew: סִיוָן לֵּוִי; born 4 June 1987) is an Israeli singer-songwriter, filmmaker, and actress.

== Early life ==
After graduating from Israel's Alon School of the Arts in 2007, Levy began her military service as a singer for the IDF Musical Ensemble.

== Career ==
Following the completion of her military service in 2009, Sivan was cast in her first film, Burning Mooki, directed by Lena and Slava Chaplin. In 2011, she starred in Veronika Kedar's feature film Joe and Belle, and appears in Invisible, directed by Michal Aviad and starring Ronit Elkabetz.

In 2012, Sivan starred in the film 6 acts, directed by Jonathan Gurfinkel, for which she received numerous awards including the Haifa International festival Best Actress Award, The Israeli Academy Award for Best leading Actress 2013 and the Israeli critic award for 2013. Levy also plays the French speaking role of 'Ava" in the feature film Inch’Allah, a Canadian-French film, directed by Anaïs Barbeau-Lavalette.

Levy began working in television in 2009, when she joined the cast of the renowned primetime TV series Ima'lle on Channel 2, directed by Ram Nehari. Later that year she appeared in Room Service, directed by Eitan Aner, and in 2010, Sivan reunited with directors Lena and Slava Chaplin, starring in the Israeli TV film In the Prime of Her Life, a modern adaptation of the works of Israeli author Shai Agnon. Sivan also appears in the TV series Yechefilm, directed by Ori Sivan and House of Wishes, directed by Haim Bouzaglo (2013).

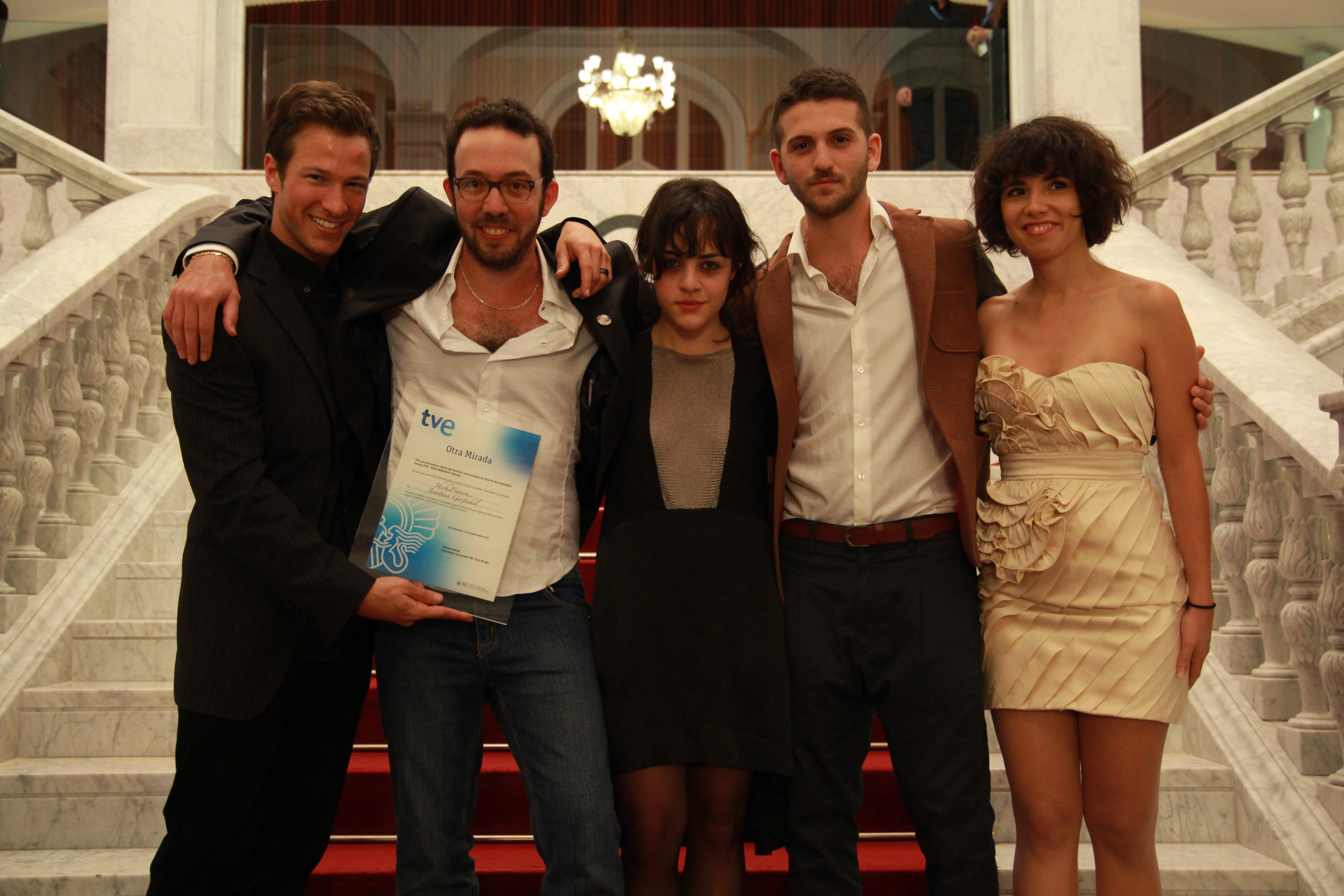
Winner of San Sebastian film festival – Other Look.

Levy has created and starred in well-received short films. Cherchez la femme (2008), which Levy co-directed with Eyal Bromberg, was featured on ARTE, presented at the Tel Aviv arts museum and selected for the Berlinale in 2009 via the "Fucking Different Tel Aviv" special project. Water Wells (2010), for which she composed an entirely original soundtrack, received worldwide festival exposure including Sundance's 'Outfest'. Sivan directed her third film, Dina & Noel alongside Natalie Melamed, composed the soundtrack with Gil Lewis and starred opposite Glenn T. Perocho, competed at the 63rd Berlin International Film Festival, in The Generation 14 plus section.

Levy is currently working on her debut album, to be recorded in English.

== Film and television credits ==
List of film and television credits
Year	Title	Role	Director	Notes
2007	Burning Mooki	Rachel Amar (Rocha Mizrachi)	Lina Chaplin and Slava Chaplin	Feature film
2007	Cherchez La Femme	Woman X	Sivan Levy and Eyal Bromberg	Video Art, 7 min. Co-created and starred. Featured on ARTE, presented at the 'Tel Aviv arts museum' and selected for the Berlinale in 2009 via the 'Fucking Different Tel Aviv' special project
2008	Ima'lle	Rotem	Ram Nehari	TV series, 8 episodes.
2008	Room Service	Hamotal	Eitan Aner	TV series, 1 episode
2009	Joe + Belle Joe+Belle	Belle (Lead)	Veronica Kedar	The film won the Israeli Oscar for the best independent film
2010	In the Prime of Her Life	Tirza (Lead)	Lina Chaplin and Slava Chaplin	Contemporary adaptation of Shay Agnon's novel.
2010	Water Wells	Inka	Sivan Levy and Iyar Dyoman	Short film, 14 min. co-created, starred and composed the original soundtrack
2011	Invisible	Dana	Michal Aviad	The film won in citation from the jury in panorama category at the Berlin International Film Festival
2011	Barefoot	Fanny	Ori Sivan	TV series, 2 episodes.
2012	Inch'Allah	Ava	Anaïs Barbeau-Lavalette	Screened at Toronto International Film Festival; A lead role in French.
2012	Six Acts	Gili (Lead)	Jonathan Gurfinkel	Ophir Award for Best Actress Haifa International Film Festival Award for Best actress
2012	Dina & Noel	Dina	Sivan Levy and Natalie Melamed	Screened at Berlinale Festival, Generation 14 plus
2013	The End	Sivan	Veronica Kedar	(Post Production)
2013	House of Wishes	Aya	Haim Bouzaglo	(Post Production)

== Awards and nominations ==
Year	Award	Category	Work	Result
2013	Awards of the Israeli Film Academy	Best Leading Actress	Six Acts	Won
2013	The Israeli Film Critics Award	Best Actress	Six Acts	Won
2012	Haifa International Film Festival	Best Actress	Six Acts	Won
2012	Tallinn Black Nights Film Festival	International Jury – Actress in a leading role	Six Acts	Won
2013	Berlin International Film Festival	Directing – Best Short Film competition – Teddy Awards	Dina & Noel	Nominated
2013	Berlin International Film Festival	Directing – Generation 14plus – Best Short Film – Crystal Bear	Dina & Noel	Nominated
2009	Berlin International Film Festival	Directing – Panorama Award of the New York Film Academy	Fucking Different Tel Aviv	Nominated

== Personal life ==
Since 2021, Levy has been in a relationship with Rotem Zakin, a collage and tattoo artist. The two married in Iceland in August 2022, their marriage merging their last names into "Levi Zakin". In December 2024, the couple had twins. Levy and her family live in Tel Aviv.
