= Romi Aboulafia =

Israeli actress, screenwriter and filmmaker

- רומי אבולעפיה
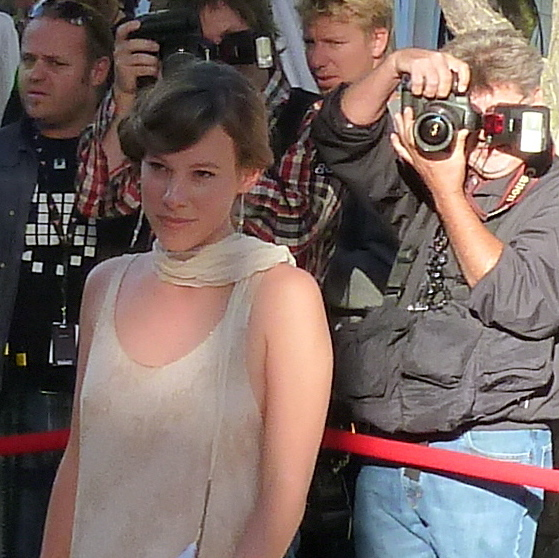
- Aboulafia in 2010
- Born: January 21, 1984 (age 42); Tel Aviv, Israel
- Education: London Film School
- Occupation: Actress
- Years active: 1990–present
- Spouse: Ben Giladi (m. 2016)
- Children: 1
- Relatives: Orly Adelson (aunt); Andrew Adelson (uncle); Hana Laszlo (mother-in-law)

Romi Aboulafia (Hebrew: רומי אבולעפיה) is an Israeli actress, screenwriter and filmmaker.

== Early life ==
Aboulafia was born in Tel Aviv, Israel, to a Sephardic Jewish family. She started acting at the age of six and was cast for a lead role in the award-winning Israel drama Shabatot VeHagim.

She was enlisted as a soldier in the IDF Spokesperson's Unit.

== Career ==
=== Acting ===
In 2010, she starred in John Madden’s The Debt alongside Helen Mirren, Jessica Chastain, and Sam Worthington. The film was released by Fox Searchlight Pictures in 2011. That year, she also starred in the Israeli LGBTQ cult indie Joe + Bell by director Veronica Kedar. In 2012, she starred in Nony Geffen's Not in Tel Aviv, which won the Jury Award at Locarno Film Festival, as well as in Endemol Shine’s strip-club-thriller Allenby. In 2014, she participated in the television series Very Important Man alongside Yehuda Levi, as well as starring in the German film Anywhere Else alongside her mother-in-law Hana Laszlo. In 2018, she starred in Endemol Shine’s Harem alongside Alon Abutbul.

=== Filmmaking ===
After her two years of mandatory army service, Aboulafia moved to the UK to study film. She earned a MFA from the London Film School and directed her thesis film Eyes, which was shot in Israel. Throughout her acting career she's also worked as a film editor.

In 2019, she began developing a television series for Endeavour Content with her husband Ben Giladi and Hagai Levi.

=== Modeling ===
At the age of eighteen, Aboulafia became the first spokesmodel for Israeli fashion brand Castro. Aboulafia presented the company for one season before deciding to leave the country to study film. Castro spokesmodels that followed include Gal Gadot and Bar Refaeli.

== Personal life ==
Aboulafia married Israeli film and television producer Ben Giladi in 2016. The two have a child together and live in London. She is the daughter-in-law of Israeli actress and comedian Hana Laszlo, sister-in-law of actor Mark Ivanir and the niece of television executive Orly Adelson.
