= Sarah Patterson =

English actress

- Born: 15 May 1970 (age 56); London, England, UK
- Education: South Hampstead High School
- Occupation: Former Actress
- Years active: 1984–1987; 2002–2007
- Children: 2

Sarah Patterson (born 15 May 1970) (Note: The IMDb (Internet Movie Database) states a birth year of 1972 which is incorrect. In effect, this would mean that Patterson was eleven, or else just turned twelve, when she filmed The Company of Wolves. The sleevenotes for The Company of Wolves Special Edition records she had just turned thirteen when she auditioned for the film. The correct birth year is 1970.) is a former English film actress. She is best known for her lead role in the 1984 gothic-horror movie The Company of Wolves.

== Early life and education ==
Patterson was born in London into a professional middle-class household, raised in Camden Town by her father, David Llewelyn Hood Patterson, a consultant physician, cardiologist and professor of medicine with the University College London Hospitals NHS Foundation Trust, of Welsh descent and his spouse. She attended South Hampstead High School, an independent school for girls in Swiss Cottage, London.

== Career ==
Discovery and Child Notoriety

Patterson's acting debut at the age of 14 was accidental, not anticipated. Planning to provide moral support to a friend who was auditioning, she was noticed by director Neil Jordan and cast in the lead role as Rosaleen, a Little Red Riding Hood character spin-off, in 1984's gothic-horror film The Company of Wolves.

"Sarah accompanied a friend to auditions,” Jordan recalls. “I spotted her waiting, auditioned her and gave her the role. When you write a part for a child, you either end up with a child actress, which is generally bad news, or with someone who has never acted before. That was the first time I gave a role to someone inexperienced, but I’ve done it subsequently in The Butcher Boy and other films like The Miracle. In The Crying Game, Jay Davidson’s character could not have been played by an actor because you would have recognised him and known he was a man. Sarah had this particular kind of beauty and was very anxious to do it. Her parents were enlightened enough to let her play in this quite disturbing film.”

Her performance was praised by critics, notwithstanding her chemistry with her co-stars, Dame Angela Lansbury, a fellow South Hampstead High School alumni and Micha Bergese as well as in the treatment of adult themes. After the film's release, she returned to education, sitting her O-levels in June 1986. Shortly after, Patterson began filming another fairy tale-inspired movie playing the titular heroine (albeit, a typecast role) in Cannon Film's low-budget Snow White which was shot on location in Israel. Cannon Films had distributed Jordan's first feature-length movie in the United States and the producer's director, Michael Berz, was seeking an actress to play the role of Snow White as part of its Cannon Movie Tales series, Patterson was the ideal candidate with prior experience in the genre.

Retirement from the Film Industry

After an unremarkable theatre opening, with the Cannon "brand" increasingly synonymous with mediocrity in North America, its primary and most lucrative market, the musical fantasy was released direct-to-video in 1987 and considered a flop. Whether as a consequence or as a contributing factor, Patterson decided to unofficially retire from the film industry at the age of 17, stepping out of the limelight entirely. There was no transition to theatre, television or other broadcasting activities, a situation akin to a voluntary rupture across all forms of entertainment. Paradoxically, Patterson continued to be represented by a local London talent agency, Kate Feast Management, in Camden, at least until 1994. This collaboration, however, failed to meet expectations had the actress expressed any to begin with.

Film Acting Reprisal in the 2000s

Patterson briefly reprised acting in two low-budget LGBTQ pictures, both produced by Valiant Doll, her friend Lisa Gornick's independent film production company. This return seems to have been prompted more out of camaraderie and opportunity than a marked commitment to the profession or financial remuneration. Nonetheless, Do I Love You? witnessed her back on-screen after an absence of fifteen years, and, later, in Tick Tock Lullaby, also in a supporting role. There was no participation in any promotional interviews, however, with Patterson remaining a deeply private individual. In the end, despite the talent, ability and promising future, as Neil Jordan remarks in a 2005 interview, "Acting is something she didn’t really pursue" with independent film scholar Matthew Edwards to add "Patterson (...) fell into acting, as opposed to (...) pursuing a dream of becoming an actress". Her acting debut certainly gives credence to that assertion.

== Personal life ==
Patterson is married with 2 children and lives in London.

== Filmography ==
Film

Year	Title	Role	Notes
1984	The Company of Wolves	Rosaleen	Feature Film
1987	Snow White	Snow White	direct-to-video
2002	Do I Love You?	Louise	Feature Film
2007	Tick Tock Lullaby	Gillian	Feature Film

Television

Year	Title	Role	Notes
1985	Temps X	As Self	One episode, 19/01/1985, to promote her first feature film in France.
