= Bnot HaZahav =

Television series

- בנות הזהב
- Genre: Sitcom
- Based on: The Golden Girls by Susan Harris
- Written by: Lea Galit; Aric Segev
- Directed by: Shirley Deshe
- Starring: Hana Laszlo; Miki Kam; Tiki Dayan; Rivka Michaeli
- Composer: Daniel Salomon
- Country of origin: Israel
- Original language: Hebrew
- No. of seasons: 6
- No. of episodes: 69 (list of episodes)

Production
- Producer: Efrat Shmaya Dror
- Production location: Herzliya Studios
- Editor: Efrat Shmaya Dror
- Running time: 25-30 minutes
- Production company: Herzliya Studios ABC Studios

Original release
- Network: Channel 10 (Nana 10)
- Release: May 26, 2011 – November 26, 2016

Bnot HaZahav (Hebrew: בנות הזהב) is an Israeli sitcom, based on the NBC sitcom The Golden Girls by Susan Harris. The series stars Hana Laszlo, Miki Kam, Tiki Dayan, and Rivka Michaeli.

== Plot ==
The series follows four seniors, who share a house in Tel Aviv. The house owner is Dalia (Hana Laszlo), who lives with her friends, Ruti Golan (Miki Kam) and Shosh Ben-Basat (Tiki Dayan). In the first episode, Ruti's mother, Riva Glambush (Rivka Michaeli) joins in living with the women after her nursing home was burned. In the series, the women deal with different things.

== Series overview ==
Season	Episodes	Originally released	
Season	Episodes	First released	Last released
1	11	May 26, 2011	August 1, 2011
2	11	October 23, 2011	January 4, 2012
3	17	October 22, 2012	January 7, 2013
4	11	November 9, 2015	January 24, 2016
5	10	May 21, 2016	August 6, 2016
6	9	August 20, 2016	November 26, 2016
