= Snow White (1987 film) =

1987 American musical film directed by Michael Berz

- DVD cover
- Directed by: Michael Berz
- Written by: Michael Berz
- Based on: Snow White published 1812 by the Brothers Grimm
- Produced by: Menahem Golan; Yoram Globus
- Starring: Diana Rigg; Sarah Patterson; Billy Barty; Nicola Stapleton
- Cinematography: Amnon Salomon
- Edited by: Moshe Avni; John S. Smith
- Music by: Arik Rudich
- Production company: Golan-Globus Productions
- Distributed by: Cannon Films
- Release date: 1987 (US)
- Running time: 83 minutes
- Countries: Israel; United States
- Language: English

Snow White is a 1987 American musical fantasy film based on the 1812 Brothers Grimm story of the same name and released as part of the "Cannon Movie Tales" series. The film was released straight to video. In August 2005 it was released on Region 1 DVD by MGM.

== Plot ==
The film opens with a handsome young prince traveling through the forest in winter with his men. In a forest glen, the prince finds Snow White asleep in a glass coffin. The seven dwarfs arrive and tell the Prince of Snow White's story through flashback.

A courageous King (Douglas Sheldon) and his fair Queen (Dorit Adi) rule their kingdom well. One winter's day while sewing with her maids, the Queen accidentally pricks her finger with her needle, and a single drop of blood falls on the snow outside her windowsill. The King declares they will have a child with hair as black as ebony, cheeks as red as blood, and skin as white as snow. The Good Queen eventually gives birth to a daughter, whom she names Snow White, but dies shortly after her child is born.

Some years later, the king marries again. However, the new queen (Diana Rigg) is vain and jealous of Snow White (Nicola Stapleton). When her magic mirror tells her that Snow White is now the fairest in the land, the Evil Queen orders a huntsman (Amnon Meskin) to take Snow White into the forest and kill her, and to bring back her liver as proof of her death. During a hunting trip, the huntsman succeeds in taking Snow White away from her father, but she realizes her stepmother's plan to destroy her. However, the huntsman couldn't bring himself to kill Snow White as a goat appears and states that the Queen wants her dead. Snow White flees into the forest where she finds a cottage belonging to seven kindly dwarves - Iddy, Biddy, Kiddy, Diddy, Fiddy, Giddy and Liddy - who allow her to stay with them. The King is heartbroken when he is told that his daughter Snow White had been eaten by wild animals, and later he is killed in a war.

Years later, Snow White (Sarah Patterson) grows into a beautiful young maiden. When the Evil Queen asks the magic mirror "who is the fairest one of all", she learns that Snow White is still alive. The Evil Queen attempts to poison Snow White in three occasions. First, she disguises herself as a gypsy woman and laces up Snow White so tightly in a bodice, and she collapses in a deep sleep, only for the dwarves to return and cut the lace with scissors, causing her to awaken.

The second time, she disguises herself as a Japanese geisha selling combs and shoves a comb poisoned with an oriental potion into Snow White's hair, which again puts her in a deep sleep. The dwarves later remove the comb from her hair and destroy it.

Finally, the Evil Queen disguises herself as an old peddler woman and offers Snow White a poisoned apple. Snow White resists at first but relents when the Evil Queen cuts the apple in half so they may share it. Snow White eats the poisoned red half of the apple and for the third time, she collapses in a deep sleep. The dwarves are unable to revive her, but they see she still looks alive, so they place her inside a glass coffin.

The film returns to the present where the dwarves allow the Prince to take the sleeping Snow White to a proper resting place. While Snow White is being transported, the coffin accidentally falls off the wagon due to a tree getting downed in a strong blizzard, causing the coffin the open and the piece of poisoned apple to dislodge from Snow White's throat, until it falls into the Evil Queen's face and Snow White awakens. The Prince is enchanted that Snow White magically revived herself and asks her to marry him, and she accepts.

Invitations to the royal wedding are sent throughout the land, and the Evil Queen receives one as well, leaving the magic mirror into concluding that the Prince's bride is the fairest in the land. Enraged at this answer, the Evil Queen smashes her mirror, which causes her to age rapidly. She rushes to the church in time to see that the bride is her stepdaughter Snow White; then the aged queen petrifies and blasts into pieces, until she finally disintegrates quickly into ashes, carried and spread by the strong wind, before she could head back to her royal carriage. Snow White and the Prince are officially married and live happily ever after.

== Cast ==
- Diana Rigg as The Evil Queen, Snow White's evil stepmother
- Sarah Patterson as Snow White
  - Nicola Stapleton as Young Snow White
- Billy Barty as Iddy
- Mike Edmonds as Biddy
- Ricardo Gil as Kiddy
- Malcolm Dixon as Diddy
- Gary Friedkin as Fiddy
- Arturo Gil as Giddy
- Tony Cooper as Liddy
- James Ian Wright as The Prince
- Douglas Sheldon as the King, Snow White's father
- Dorit Adi as the First and Good Queen, Snow White's mother
- Julian Chagrin as the Magic Mirror Head
- Amnon Meskin as the Huntsman
- Azara Rapoport as the other King, the Prince's father
