= Hana Laszlo =

Israeli actress and comedian

- חנה לסלאו
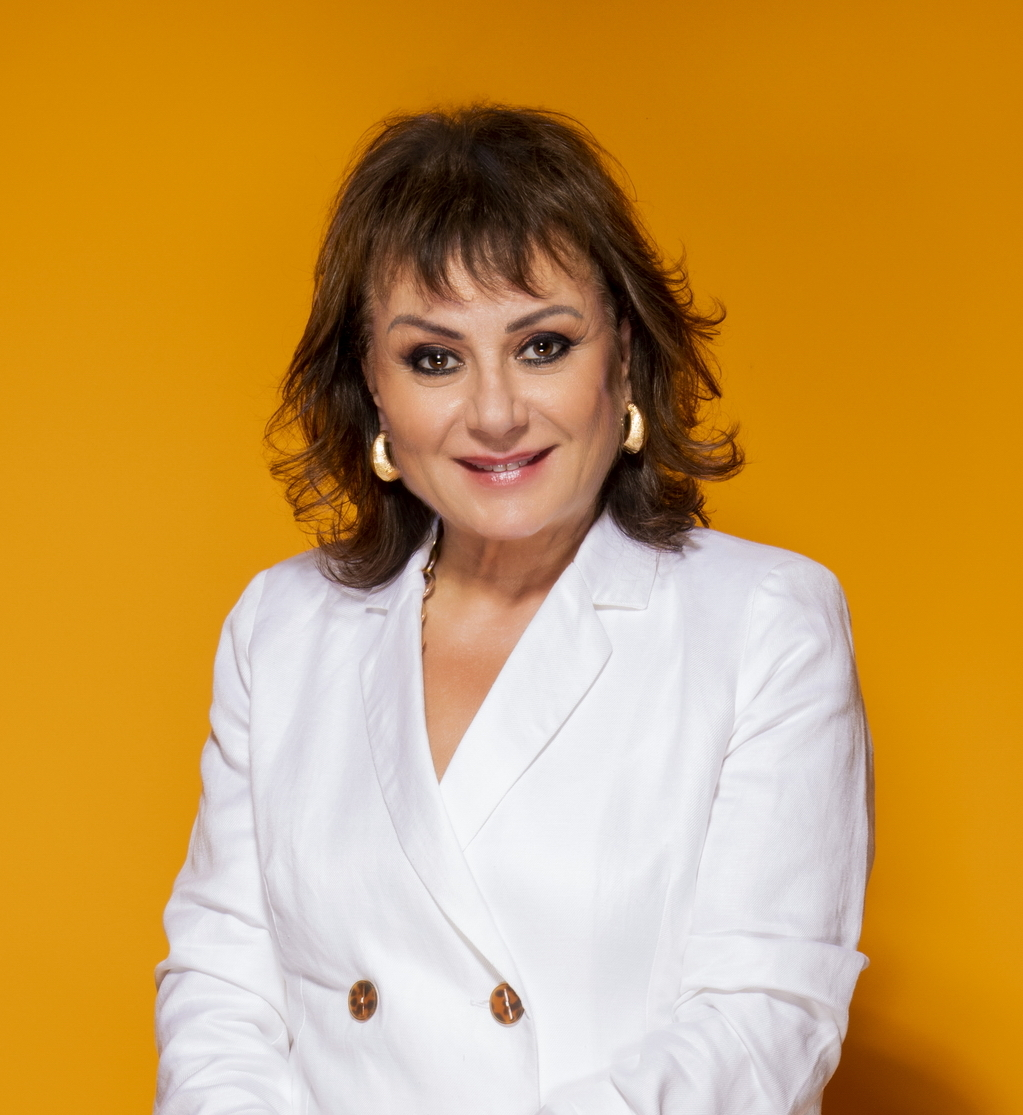
- Laszlo in 2020
- Born: 14 June 1953 (age 73); Jaffa, Israel
- Occupations: Actress; comedian; television presenter
- Years active: 1974–present
- Spouse(s): Aviv Giladi (divorced); Benny Bloch (divorced)
- Children: 2
- Relatives: Romi Aboulafia (daughter-in-law)
- Awards: Cannes Film Festival Award for Best Actress (2005)

Hana Laszlo (Hebrew: חנה לסלאו; born 14 June 1953) is an Israeli actress, television presenter and comedian. In 2005, she won a Cannes Film Festival Award for Best Actress for her performance in the film Free Zone. She has also received four Ophir Award nominations.

== Early and personal life ==
Laszlo was born in Jaffa, Tel Aviv to a family of Ashkenazi Jewish descent. Her parents were Holocaust survivors who were born in Poland.

In 1972–1973, she served in the Southern Command Band.

She met her first husband, Israeli media proprietor Aviv Giladi, on the set of Uri Zohar's Save The Lifeguard. The two proceeded to work together on various stage productions and eventually got married in 1979.

Laszlo has two sons from her first marriage – Ben and Ithamar. Her eldest, Ben Giladi, is a film and television producer. Her daughter-in-law is Israeli actress and filmmaker Romi Aboulafia, with whom she frequently collaborates.

Laszlo married and divorced businessman Benny Bloch.

== Career ==
Laszlo rose to success in the 1980s and 1990s in the wake of character-driven comedy routines. She created and portrayed some of the most iconic characters of that era – including such characters as 'Safta Zapta' and 'Clara the Cleaning Lady.'

Through the 90s, Laszlo was the highest grossing female entertainer in Israel. However, due to financial and personal calamity, her career came to a halt in the beginning of the new millennium.

After several silent years, Laszlo restarted building her career from the ground up. She was reintroduced to the public and younger crowd through her role as Naomi Shahar in the highly successful musical telenovela HaShir Shelanu.

In 2005 she won the Best Actress Award at the 2005 Cannes Film Festival for her role in Free Zone. Laszlo stars in the film alongside Natalie Portman. The Palme d'Or marked the pick of Laszlo's comeback.

From 2002–2004, Laszlo was one of two presenters (the other being Pnina Dvorin) of the Israeli version of the British television game show The Weakest Link.

In 2010, she served as a judge with Claude Dadia and Eli Mizrachi on Rokdim Im Kokhavim, the Israeli version of Dancing with the Stars.

Laszlo wrote, produced, financed and starred in more than a dozen one-woman shows since the 1980s.

In 2019, she received an honorary PhD from Bar-Ilan University for contributions to the stage arts. She never had formal education but speaks and performs in six different languages – Hebrew, English, Yiddish, French, German and Dutch.

Laszlo performed the voice of Nai Nai in the Hebrew-Language dub of the 2019 animated film Abominable.

== Filmography ==
| Year | Film | Role | Notes |
|---|---|---|---|
| 1976 | Giv'at Halfon Eina Ona | Hermona | Assi Dayan film |
| 1977 | Hatzilu Et HaMatzil | | Uri Zohar; Itzik Kol film |
| 1978 | Belfer | | Yigal Bursztyn film |
| 1978 | Millioner Betzarot | The Maid | Joel Silberg film |
| 1981 | Am Yisrael Hai | | Assi Dayan film |
| 1983 | Kuni Lemel in Cairo | | Joel Silberg film |
| 2003 | Alila | Mali | Amos Gitai film Nominee: Ophir Award for Best Supporting Actress |
| 2004 | Ahava Ze Koev | Eddy's Mom | Episode 1.1 a.k.a. Love Hurts |
| 2004 | Ha-Chuliya Hachalasha | Hostess | Israeli version of the Weakest Link |
| 2004–2007 | HaShir Shelanu | Naomi Shahar/Herself | TV series, a.k.a. Our Song |
| 2005 | Free Zone | Hanna Ben Moshe | Amos Gitai film Winner: Best Actress Award (Cannes Film Festival); Nominee: Ophir Award for Best Actress |
| 2008 | Shiva | Max | Ronit Elkabetz & Shlomi Elkabetz film a.k.a. 7 Days |
| 2008 | On the Road to Tel Aviv | Hana | Khen Shalem film |
| 2008 | Adam Resurrected | Rachel Shwester | Paul Schrader film |
| 2008 | Ima'lle | Real estate agent | Episode 3.1 |
| 2009 | Ultimatum | Bellas | Alain Tasma film |
| 2009 | Guyavot | Contesa | Kobi Machat film |
| 2011–2016 | Bnot HaZahav | Dalia | TV series; Israeli version of The Golden Girls |
| 2012 | Tanuchi! | Naomi Shahar | TV series, a.k.a. Take a Chill Pill! |
| 2014 | Anywhere Else | Rachel | Alongside her daughter-in-law Romi Aboulafia |
| 2015–2017 | Mossad 101 | Doris Levi | TV series |
| 2017–present | Nevsu | Nitza | TV series Winner: International Emmy Award – Comedy |
| 2020 | Laila in Haifa | Hanna | Amos Gitai film |

== Awards and recognition ==
- 2005 Cannes Film Festival
- Best Actress Award for Free Zone
- Ophir Award for Best Actress for Free Zone (nomination)
- Ophir Award for Best Supporting Actress for Alila (nomination)
