= List of Bnot HaZahav Episodes =

This is a list of episodes for the show Bnot HaZahav.

== Series overview ==
Season	Episodes	Originally released	
Season	Episodes	First released	Last released
1	11	May 26, 2011	August 1, 2011
2	11	October 23, 2011	January 4, 2012
3	17	October 22, 2012	January 7, 2013
4	11	November 9, 2015	January 24, 2016
5	10	May 21, 2016	August 6, 2016
6	9	August 20, 2016	November 26, 2016

== Episodes ==
=== Season 1 (2011) ===
No. overall	No. in season	Title	Original release date
1	1	"At a Good Hour (בשעה טובה)"	May 26, 2011
2	2	"The Big Breakthrough (הפריצה הגדולה)"	June 2, 2011
3	3	"To Be Sisters and not to Be (אחיות או לא להיות)"	June 9, 2011
4	4	"Sound of Joy and Sound of Happiness (קול ששון וקול שמחה)"	June 16, 2011
5	5	"Party at Dunakeszi (חגיגה בדונצי)"	June 20, 2011
6	6	"The New Economy (הכלכלה החדשה)"	June 27, 2011
7	7	"Shuki's Ship (שוקי שוקי ספינתי)"	July 4, 2011
8	8	"The French Connection (הקשר הצרפתי)"	July 11, 2011
9	9	"Grandsons are Happiness (נכדים זה שמחה)"	July 18, 2011
10	10	"Bad Girl (ילדה רעה)"	July 25, 2011
11	11	"Big Vershavski (ביג ורשבסקי)"	August 1, 2011

=== Season 2 (2011-12) ===
No. overall	No. in season	Title	Original release date
12	1	"Nachum's Back (שובו של הנחום)"	October 23, 2011
13	2	"Small Problem (בעיה קטנה)"	October 30, 2011
14	3	"Tradition (מסורת)"	November 6, 2011
15	4	"Heart of Mother (לב של אימא)"	November 13, 2011
16	5	"In Bed with Shoshana (במיטה עם שושנה)"	November 20, 2011
17	6	"Sandwich Girl ('ילדת סנדוויץ)"	November 27, 2011
18	7	"About Mice and Women (על עכברים ונשים)"	December 7, 2011
19	8	"Life Is Beautiful (החיים יפים)"	December 14, 2011
20	9	"Operation Riva (מבצע ריבה)"	December 21, 2011
21	10	"Little Avner (אבנר הקטן)"	December 28, 2011
22	11	"A Flat for Rent (דירה להשכיר)"	January 4, 2012

=== Season 3 (2012-13) ===
No. overall	No. in season	Title	Original release date
23	1	"Start Over Again (להתחיל מחדשדש)"	October 22, 2012
24	2	"Riva's Birthday (יומולדת לריבה)"	October 29, 2012
25	3	"Cruelty to Animals' Owners (צער בעלות חיים)"	October 31, 2012
26	4	"It Costs More (זה עולה יותר)"	November 5, 2012
27	5	"To Shosh in Love (לשוש באהבה)"	November 7, 2012
28	6	"The Man (גבר גבר)"	November 14, 2012
29	7	"A Friend (ידידה)"	November 21, 2012
30	8	"A Troubling Issue (נושא מטריד)"	November 28, 2012
31	9	"A Family Business (עסק משפחתי)"	December 3, 2012
32	10	"Operation Gita (מבצע גיטה)"	December 5, 2012
33	11	"Shabbat Shalom (שבת שלום)"	December 10, 2012
34	12	"Migrant Work (עבודה זרה)"	December 12, 2012
35	13	"Allways Woman (תמיד אישה)"	December 17, 2012
36	14	"Trachtenberg (טרכטנברג)"	December 19, 2012
37	15	"Crisis in the Industry (משבר בענף)"	December 25, 2012
38	16	"The Nation Demands Riva's Justice (העם דורש צדק ריבתי)"	December 27, 2012
39	17	"Sherlock Shosh (שרלוק שוש)"	January 7, 2013

=== Season 4 (2015-16) ===
No. overall	No. in season	Title	Original release date
40	1	"Welcome Back (ברוכות השבות)"	November 9, 2015
41	2	"To the Glory of Riva's State (לתפארת מדינת ריבה)"	November 16, 2015
42	3	"Goes on Blind (הולכת על בליינד)"	November 23, 2015
43	4	"The Money Wedding (חתונת הכסף)"	November 29, 2015
44	5	"Two Sides of the Cow (שני צדדים לפרה)"	December 13, 2015
45	6	"Prevention is Better than Cure (להקדים תרופה למכה)"	December 20, 2015
46	7	"There's a lot of Fishermen in the Sea (יש הרבה דייגים בים)"	December 27, 2015
47	8	"Friendly Ruti (רותי החברתית)"	January 3, 2016
48	9	"All Basat's Sons (כולם היו בני בסט)"	January 10, 2016
49	10	"Commotion at the Chicken Coop (מהומה בלול)"	January 17, 2016
50	11	"Not a Big Deal לא ביג דיל"	January 24, 2016

=== Season 5 (2016) ===
No. overall	No. in season	Title	Original release date
51	1	"Sleight of Hand (זריזות ידיים)"	May 21, 2016
52	2	"Behind the Prison Bars (מאחורי הסורגים)"	June 4, 2016
53	3	"Peace with Shoshi (שלום עם שושי)"	June 18, 2016
54	4	"All Dalia's People (כל אנשי הדליה)"	June 25, 2016
55	5	"The One from the Grocery Store (ההוא מהמכולת)"	July 2, 2016
56	6	"The Worthy Person (יקירת המעלה)"	July 9, 2016
57	7	"Kiddo Kiddo (ילדונת ילדונת)"	July 16, 2016
58	8	"The Hunger Games (משחקי הרעב)"	July 23, 2016
59	9	"Shoshi the Gullible (שושי מאמין לכל דבר)"	July 30, 2016
60	10	"Stars are Born (כוכבות נולדות)"	August 6, 2016

=== Season 6 (2016) ===
No. overall	No. in season	Title	Original release date
61	1	"Group Psychotherapy (טיפול קבוצתי)"	August 20, 2016
62	2	"Friends Tell about Riva (חברות מספרות על ריבה)"	August 27, 2016
63	3	"The Little Watcher (הרואה הקטנה)"	September 3, 2016
64	4	"Memories from School (זיכרונות מבית הספר)"	September 10, 2016
65	5	"Dalia TV (TV דליה)"	September 17, 2016
66	6	"Board and Age (לוח וגיל)"	September 24, 2016
67	7	"Riva the Puupet (ריבה על חוט)"	November 13, 2016
68	8	"Hear Something (תשמעו קטע)"	November 19, 2016
69	9	"A Flat for Sale (דירה למכירה)"	November 26, 2016
