= Kenny Dino =

American singer (1939–2009)

Kenneth J. Diono, known professionally as Kenny Dino (July 12, 1939 – December 10, 2009) was an American singer born in Astoria, Queens, New York, United States.

Dino's family moved to Hicksville, Long Island in 1955, where he worked on a family farm. He joined the Navy in 1957, and while stationed in Iceland he came in runner-up in a talent show with his version of a song by Elvis Presley. He sang regularly on his tour of duty, and then put together an ensemble back in the States, which toured in Texas and Louisiana. He frequently played with Doug Sahm at the San Antonio Blues Club at this time.

He signed with Dot Records around 1960 after moving to New York City, but quickly lost the contract, and signed to Columbia not long after. Dino was offered a chance to duet with Paul Simon but turned it down, and later was offered the song "Suspicion" (an Elvis Presley song, which later became a big hit for Terry Stafford) but was denied the opportunity by his label. He recorded a number of demos for Elvis, including the song "Good Luck Charm".

His lone hit was "Your Ma Said You Cried in Your Sleep Last Night", a No. 24 U.S. Pop hit in 1961. The three back-up singers were Lois Green, Leslie Smith and Alan Eichler, who were all students at Syosset High School at the time. When all further releases yielded no commercial gain, Dino switched to acting and appeared in the film, Valley of the Dolls. Robert Plant later covered this tune on his 1990 release, Manic Nirvana.

== Death ==
On December 9, 2009, Kenny Dino had finished his second music gig of the day and was driving from Melbourne, Florida on Interstate 95 to his home in Cocoa, Florida. He pulled over to the side of the road where construction workers found him unconscious. They called the Florida Highway Patrol and paramedics, but Dino died from a heart attack in the early hours of December 10, 2009.
