= The Book of Gabrielle =

2016 film by Lisa Gornick

- Directed by: Lisa Gornick
- Screenplay by: Lisa Gornick
- Starring: Lisa Gornick; Anna Koval; Allan Corduner
- Music by: Jasmin Kent Rodgman
- Release dates: 10 November 2016 (UK International Jewish Film Festival); 29 June 2017
- Running time: 80 minutes
- Country: United Kingdom

The Book of Gabrielle is a 2016 comedy-drama film directed and starring by Lisa Gornick. The film also stars Anna Koval and Allan Corduner.

== Plot ==
Book illustrator Gabrielle is writing an illustrated guidebook on sex called How To Do It. At a book signing, she meets Saul, an established heterosexual male writer. She both loves and hates his work which has seeped into her secular Jewish life from childhood. The more Gabrielle tells him about her book the more he wants to know about her life, the relationship with her younger girlfriend, Olivia, and her determination to "stop using my penis in sex". As her book takes form, their friendship is tested as is Gabrielle's relationship with Olivia. The film muses on how we write, how we draw, and what influences us.

== Cast ==
- Lisa Gornick: Gabrielle
- Anna Koval: Olivia
- Allan Corduner: Saul
- Joni Kamen: Fiona
- Juha Sorola: Aki
- Ruth Lass: Jessica

== Production ==
The film is part of a multi-platform production, consisting of a live drawing show, a book and a web series that follows the eponymous Gabrielle through her process of writing the aforementioned book while contemplating her relationship with younger girlfriend. Gornick drew and wrote the book, How to do it, the subject book of the film, a sex how-to guide. Her reasoning for including the various platforms was her desire for fluidity in exploring the ideas in the film, which these platforms provide to varying degrees, unlike the film format.

== Reception ==
In Adil F Hussain's review of the film, he notes that true to form, Gornick directs films that make the audience consider the questions and themes raised in the work; in this case, sexuality and gender. He commended the "brilliantly executed performances that keep you engaged and peak your curiosity". In LGBTQ Arts Review, Dan Ramsden critiqued the film for the "stakes" not being high enough, and yet applauded it overall for its normative portrayal of both lesbian sex and relationships, feeling that "there is a tendency in most films for lesbian romances or erotic topics to either be coming-of-age stories, or hyper-erotic. This was done through natural characters and dialogue rather than soft-core porn which made it feel a lot more identifiable."

== Awards ==
- Jury Award for Best Feature, Bologna Lesbian Film Festival, Some Prefer Cake, 2017
- Audience Award for Best Feature, Bologna Lesbian Film Festival, Some Prefer Cake, 2017
