= Tick Tock Lullaby =

2007 film by Lisa Gornick

- Theatrical release poster
- Directed by: Lisa Gornick
- Screenplay by: Lisa Gornick
- Produced by: Lisa Gornick
- Starring: Raquel Cassidy; Lisa Gornick; Sarah Patterson
- Cinematography: Campbell Ex; Sophie Meyer; Liz Smith
- Edited by: Maya T. Harris
- Music by: Mat Davidson
- Production company: Valiant Doll
- Distributed by: Wolfe Releasing (2007) (US) (all media); Peccadillo Pictures (2008) (UK) (DVD); Force Entertainment (2008) (Australia) (DVD); Edition Salzgeber (2008) (Germany) (DVD); BQHL (2009) (France) (DVD)
- Release dates: 29 March 2007 (United Kingdom); 3 May 2007 (United States)
- Running time: 73 minutes
- Country: United Kingdom
- Language: English
- Budget: £8,000

Tick Tock Lullaby is a 2007 British indie comedy-drama film written and directed by Lisa Gornick. It stars Gornick and Raquel Cassidy and Sarah Patterson.

== Cast ==
- Raquel Cassidy as Maya
- Lisa Gornick as Sasha
- Sarah Patterson as Gillian
- Joanna Bending as Fiona
- Sam Spruell as Steve
- Jake Canuso as Laurence
- Matthew Parish as Fred
- David Lazenby as Hick
- William Bowry as Todd
- Joseph Lumsden
- Aviva Gornick
- Rupert Jones
- Melissa Docker
- Mikhail Karikis
- Uriel Orlow
