= Your Ma Said You Cried in Your Sleep Last Night =

1961 song by Kenny Dino

"Your Maw Said You Cried (in Your Sleep Last Night)"

Song by The Turtles

from the album It Ain't Me Babe
- Released: 1965

"Your Ma Said You Cried in Your Sleep Last Night"

Single by Robert Plant

from the album Manic Nirvana
- Released: June 18, 1990
- Genre: Rock, hip hop, doo-wop, alternative rock
- Length: 4:36
- Label: Es Paranza
- Songwriters: R. Glazer, S. Schlaks
- Producers: Robert Plant, Phil Johnstone, Mark "Spike" Stent

Robert Plant singles chronology
"Hurting Kind (I've Got My Eyes on You)" (1990)	"Your Ma Said You Cried in Your Sleep Last Night" (1990)	"29 Palms" (1993)

"Your Ma Said You Cried in Your Sleep Last Night" is a song performed by American singer Kenny Dino. It was Dino's only hit on the Billboard Top 40, debuting on that chart December 4, 1961, and peaking at number 24.

== Doug Sheldon version ==
Actor Doug Sheldon's cover version was also released in 1961. It reached number 29 on the UK singles chart in 1962.

== Robert Plant version ==
English rock singer Robert Plant also recorded a version of the song and included it on his 1990 album Manic Nirvana. It was released as a single and reached number 90 on the UK singles chart and number 8 on the Billboard Mainstream Rock chart.
