= Meskie Shibru-Sivan =

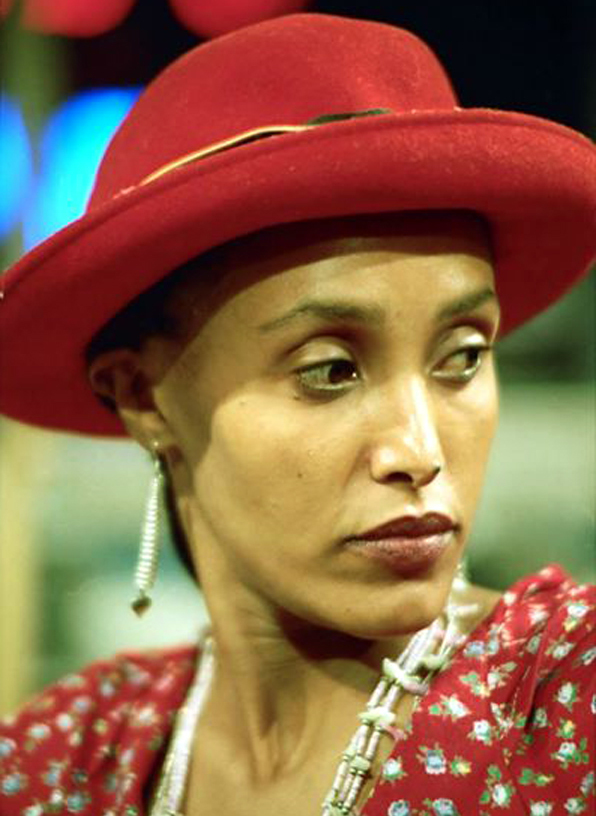
Shibru-Sivan c. 1995

Meskie Shibru (Hebrew: מַסְקי שיברוּ; born September 22, 1967) is an Israeli actress, director, writer and vocalist.

== Biography ==
Meskie was born in Ethiopia under the name Meskie Shibru. Her mother was a Prisoner of Zion and was sent to the Ethiopean prison for two years because she helped Jews migrate to Israel. She came to Israel without her family, except her sister, in 1985, when she was 16 years old. Supposedly she came to study computer science, but instead she studied acting at the Nissan Nativ School of Acting in Tel Aviv. Her family followed later.

She participated in many television shows, films, and concerts. Some of these were related to her Ethiopian roots.

In 1999, she played the role of Inbal in an episode of the Israeli TV series Zinzana and herself in an episode of the children's series Parparim (Butterflies).

Shibru acted as Shlomo's mother in the 2005 French-Belgian-Israeli-Italian film "Va, vis et deviens" (English title: Go, Live, and Become).

She also acts and sings in the role of Queen of Sheba in Sipurim keyad Hamelekh, an Israeli production for children starring Tuvia Tzafir.

In 2017 she starred in a supporting role in the hit Israeli series, Nevsu, winner of the International Emmy Award for the comedy series of 2018. It premiered on Netflix in 2022 during its second season.
