= Doug Sheldon =

English pop singer, actor and novelist (1936–2023)

- Born: Bernard Bobrow; 22 June 1936; Stepney, London, England
- Died: 25 March 2023 (aged 86)
- Occupation: Singer · actor · writer

Douglas Sheldon (born Bernard Bobrow, 22 June 1936 – 25 March 2023) was an English pop singer, actor and novelist.

== Early life ==
Sheldon was born as Bernard Bobrow in Stepney, London, England on 22 June 1936, into a family of carnival businesspeople. He worked as a barker while receiving training in acting.

== Career ==
After completing military service, he landed a role in the 1961 film The Guns of Navarone, and worked in small theatre productions. He shared a flat in London with three other then-unknown actors, including Michael Caine and Sean Connery. Sheldon was discovered by Bunny Lewis while performing on-stage and was quickly offered a recording contract with Decca Records, even though he had no previous experience performing as a singer.

Sheldon's first single was "Book of Love", which did not chart. The follow-up single was a cover of the song "Runaround Sue", which became a hit record in the UK Singles Chart reaching number 36, although Dion's version soon overshadowed it in popularity. His next single, "Your Ma Said You Cried in Your Sleep Last Night", became his highest-charting hit in the UK at number 29. Shel Talmy produced the next single, "Lollipops and Roses", which flopped, but with the song "I Saw Linda Yesterday" he managed to crack the UK Singles Chart for the last time in 1963 at number 36, thus emulating his first hit's position.

After the middle of the decade, Sheldon returned to a career in acting, where he appeared on TV in Doctor Who, The Avengers and Triangle, and in films such as The Yellow Teddy Bears (1963), the musical comedy Just for You (1964), Some Girls Do (1969), The Spy Killer (1969), Ryan's Daughter (1970), Soft Beds, Hard Battles (1974), Appointment with Death (1988) and Iron Eagle II (1988). He also published novels using the slightly fuller name of Douglas Sheldon. In 2007, his entire Decca discography was released on CD by Vocalion Records.

== Death ==
Sheldon died on 25 March 2023, at the age of 86.

== Singles ==
- "Book of Love" (1961)
- "Runaround Sue" (1961) UK No. 36
- "Your Ma Said You Cried in Your Sleep Last Night" (1962) UK No. 29
- "Lollipops and Roses" (1963)
- "I Saw Linda Yesterday" (1963) UK No. 36
- "Mickey's Monkey" (1964)
- "Let's Make A Habit Of This" (1964) Decca DL 25 111 (Teldec)

== Filmography ==
=== Film ===
Year	Title	Role	Notes
1963	The Yellow Teddy Bears	Mike Griffin	
1965	Three Hats for Lisa	Docks Foreman	
1968	Up the Junction	Villain	Uncredited
1969	Some Girls Do	Kruger	
1969	The Best House in London	Second Heckler	Uncredited
1970	Ryan's Daughter	Driver	
1974	Soft Beds, Hard Battles	Kapitan Kneff	
1987	Snow White	The King	
1988	Appointment with Death	Captain Rogers	
1988	Iron Eagle II	Demitriev	
1992	Daleks: The Early Years	Kirksen	Archival footage

=== Television ===
Year	Title	Role	Notes
1960	The Long Way Home	Gestapo Guard	2 episodes
1960, 1961	Probation Officer	Teddy Lukins / Ray Russell	2 episodes
1961	Deadline Midnight	'Onions'	Episode: "The Girls from Harrow"
1965	Doctor Who	Kirksen	2 episodes; serial: The Daleks' Master Plan
1965, 1966	Dixon of Dock Green	Alan Taylor / PC Andrews	2 episodes
1966	Isadora	Chauffeur	Television film
1968	The Avengers	Brad	Episode: "The Forget-Me-Knot"
1969	The Spy Killer	Alworthy	Television film
1972	Scoop	Hans	Episode: "The Ubiquitous Mr. Baldwin"
1972, 1974	Softly, Softly: Task Force	Collins / Vernon Wills	2 episodes
1978	Law & Order	D.S. Jack Barcy	2 episodes
1979	Secret Army	Defending Officer / Major Scheer	2 episodes
1981	Triangle	Arthur Parker	26 episodes
1981	Armchair Thriller	Otto	Episode: "The Chelsea Murders"
1988	Thieves in the Night	Judge Wilmot	Television film
