= Orly Adelson =

American-Israeli television producer

- Born: 1957 (age 68–69); Israel
- Education: Jerusalem Academy of Music and Dance; Hebrew University; Tel Aviv University
- Occupation: Television producer
- Spouse: Andrew Adelson
- Children: 2
- Relatives: Romi Aboulafia (niece)

Orly Adelson (born 1957) is an American-Israeli television producer who served as president of Dick Clark Productions and ITV Studios America.

== Biography ==
Adelson was born in Israel and completed her education in sociology and musicology at the Jerusalem Academy of Music and Dance, Hebrew University, and Tel Aviv University. She served as a lieutenant in the Israeli Army. In 1982, she moved to the United States after meeting her husband, Andrew Adelson, a Hollywood producer. In 1991, she produced and sold her first film to NBC, Shoot First: A Cop's Vengeance with the support of NBC executive Ruth Slauson. In 2002, she worked for television producer Michael Brandman as president for development focusing on adapting plays into television films. She later accepted a position with Roger Gimbel at Carolco-Gimbel (later Gimbel-Adelson) as an independent producer. Her production company, Orly Adelson Productions, produced over 40 made-for-television movies including such titles as Murder Between Friends and Desperate Rescue: The Cathy Mahone Story. Mark Shapiro of ESPN noticed her work and asked her to produce for ESPN; she made 3: The Dale Earnhardt Story and the series Playmakers. After Shapiro left ESPN to become CEO of Six Flags which had recently purchased Dick Clark Productions (along with Daniel Snyder's RedZone Capital) for $175 million, Shapiro asked Adelson to become president of Dick Clark Productions.

In 2008, she was named president of Dick Clark Productions which focuses on developing, producing, funding, and distributing presentation ceremonies. At Dick Clark Productions, Adelson oversees over twenty television projects including the Miss USA Award Ceremony, the Miss Universe Pageant, the Golden Globes, the American Music Awards, the Academy of Country Music Awards, and the ALMA (American Latino Media Arts) Award. She is also responsible for the dance show So You Think You Can Dance and its Israeli counterpart, Nolad Lirkod; the Times Square New Year's show with Ryan Seacrest; and the Super Bowl pre-game show. While president, she changed the way said programming was delivered including adding twitter to the bottom of the screen, developing preliminary shows leading up to the event, and the use of internet live streaming. While at Dick Clark Productions, she has hired some of the top talent in Israel including Ariel Eliezer as head of the company's digital department and producer Asaf Blacher.

In January 2014, she accepted a position as president of ITV Studios America; she left the firm in July 2015. In 2012, she was nominated for an Emmy for producing the 2011 Golden Globe awards ceremony. She was named as The Hollywood Reporter's "Power 100 Women in Entertainment" and as one of Variety's "Women of Impact." She is also a member of the Women In Film association. She serves as the agent for actor Ryan Kwanten.

== Personal life ==
She is married to Andrew Adelson, son of Merv Adelson, and brother of Gary Adelson. They have two children: Jonathan and Corrie and live in Brentwood, Los Angeles. Actress Romi Aboulafia is her niece and actor Mark Ivanir is married to another niece.
