= Soft Beds, Hard Battles =

1974 film by John Boulting, Roy Boulting

- Theatrical release poster
- Directed by: Roy Boulting
- Written by: Roy Boulting; Leo Marks
- Based on: an idea by Maurice Moisiewitsch
- Produced by: John Boulting; Roy Boulting
- Starring: Peter Sellers; Curd Jurgens; Lila Kedrova
- Cinematography: Gilbert Taylor
- Edited by: Martin Charles
- Music by: Neil Rhoden
- Production company: Charter Film Productions
- Distributed by: The Rank Organisation (through Fox-Rank)
- Release date: January 1974 (UK)
- Running time: 107 minutes
- Country: United Kingdom
- Language: English
- Budget: £750,000

Soft Beds, Hard Battles is a 1974 British comedy film directed by Roy Boulting, starring Peter Sellers (in several roles), Curd Jürgens, Lila Kedrova and Jenny Hanley. Sellers reunited with the Boulting brothers for this farce, in which the women of a brothel help the war effort to rid the world of the Nazi peril – in the bedroom.

The film took a limited release; in the United States, it was released under the title Undercovers Hero.

== Plot ==
Set in Nazi-occupied France, the story follows Major Robinson of the British Army. Installing himself at a Parisian brothel, he assists the French resistance and works with Madame Grenier and her girls who find themselves eliminating high ranking German officers (using ingenious rigged beds and killer flatulence pills) right under the noses of the Gestapo. The girls find themselves enlisted in the Free French Forces and finally help to foil Hitler's plan to blow up Paris. They later receive medals from the French president.

== Cast ==
- Peter Sellers as General Latour/Major Robinson/Herr Schroeder/Adolf Hitler/President of France/Prince Kyoto/Narrator
- Lila Kedrova as Madame Grenier
- Curd Jürgens as General von Grotjahn
- Béatrice Romand as Marie-Claude
- Jenny Hanley as Michelle
- Gabriella Licudi as Simone
- Françoise Pascal as Madeleine
- Rex Stallings as Alan Cassidy
- Rula Lenska as Louise
- Daphne Lawson as Claudine
- Hylette Adolphe as Tom-tom
- Vernon Dobtcheff as Padre
- Doug Sheldon as Kapitan Kneff
- Thorley Walters as General Erhardt
- Timothy West as Chaplain
- Jean Charles Driant as Jean
- Philip Madoc as Field Marshal Weber
- Patricia Burke as Mother Superior
- Basil Dignam as Brigadier
- Nicholas Loukes as Schultz
- Stanley Lebor as 1st Gestapo agent
- Gertan Klauber as 2nd Gestapo agent
- Barry J. Gordon as 3rd Gestapo agent
- Joan Baxter as Vera Lynn
- Carolle Rousseau as Hélène
- Windsor Davies as Bisset
- Nicholas Courtney as French Intelligence Officer (uncredited)

== Production ==
John and Roy Boulting had been pursuing separate careers for several years before reuniting to make this film. John left his position as managing director of British Lion which he held for six years to produce "because I am anxious to make films again."

The project began as a script called The Saga of the Six Black Virgins by Maurice Foster. The brothers disliked it but were interested in the idea of viewing the war through the point of view of a brothel, albeit with new characters and a new story. Roy Boulting wrote the script with Leo Marks in 1971 and 1972. They decided to offer the film to Peter Sellers, who accepted in July 1972. Maurice Foster left the project and the Boultings bought out his interest.

John Boulting called the film "a flippant look at war and the absurdities of war... All naked men are alike really and the film stresses the idea that wars are not won or lost by top level Whitehall, Pentagon, or Wilhemstrasse strategy but by fortuitous intangibles and by the foibles of human beings."

The Boultings revived their old company, Charter Film Productions, and obtained investment from Lord Goodman and Max Rayne. Part of the budget came from the Rank Organisation (by the end of the 1974 financial year Rank financed Carry on Dick, Carry on Girls, The Belstone Fox and Don't Just Lie There, Say Something, and partly financed Soft Beds and Hard Battles and Caravan to Vaccares.)

In August 1972 the Boultings were told Sellers had changed his mind. Filming was postponed, although the Boultings had spent £35,000 of their own money. Sellers eventually changed his mind again.

The brothers were directors of British Lion, which was sold to Barclay Securities. Barclay proposed to sell 45 of the 60 acres of Shepperton studio for housing development. The union protested and said if any of the previous directors of Shepperton, such as the Boultings, tried to make films anywhere they would be blackbanned. Production on the film began in March 1973 but was halted due to uncertainty about the banning.

John Boulting blamed "a little cabal of Communists who are ideologically motivated. They are dedicated in my view not to the improvement of our industry but to the destruction of the whole fabric of society." The union said the Boultings were "hysterical."

The union withdrew the blackban provided the Boultings give "prior consideration" to Shepperton for the making of any other films. The brothers agreed. Filming, which was to have begun on 3 April, started on 16 April. It was a 62 day shoot with Sellers required for 51; filming mostly took place at Sheperton Studios with one week of filming in France.

Filming finished by May 1973.

During filming it was revealed Sellers had begun a romantic relationship with Liza Minnelli.

== Reception ==
The film was a financial failure and Roy Boulting lost a considerable amount of his own money on it. Filmink argued the movie "help kill" the film career of the brothers.

=== Critical ===
Evening Standard called it "glaringly unfunny, so stamped with the mark of 20 years ago." The Guardian wrote "it's dreadful, and I cant think of how it happened."

The Irish Times called it "his best film for some time". Vincent Canby The New York Times called it "a sketch film with very few jokes". Time Out wrote: "Its raison d'être is Peter Sellers, back in brilliant form as six variations on blinkered authority, including Hitler and a De Gaulle-ish French general, but particularly as the Gestapo chief Schroeder, limping-cum-strutting from disaster to disaster, an extraordinary amalgam of Dr Strangelove and Fred Kite. Worth a visit for Sellers and one classic joke about a PoW."
