= Nevsu =

Nevsu (or Nebsu, Hebrew: נֶבְסוּ, Amharic: ነፍሱ) is an Israeli sitcom and the winner of the 2018 International Emmy Award for Best Comedy Series.

The show first aired on March 9, 2017, on Israeli Channel 2, as part of the "Reshet" franchise. The series was created and written by Yossi Vasa, Shai Ben Attar, and Liat Shavit, directed by Shai Ben Attar and starring Yossi Vasa, Meyrav Feldman, Hana Laszlo, Gadi Yagil, Meskie Shibru, and Solomon Marisha. The first season ended on 6 April 2017, after seven episodes. Following the split of Channel 2, the second season premiered on November 6, 2017, and was broadcast on Reshet 13 of the network.

In September 2017, the series was sold to the American FOX network. On November 12, 2017, it was announced that the series had been nominated for Best Comedy at the international television awards ceremony of C21Media in London.

== Plot ==
"Nevsu" focuses on a Jewish-Ethiopian-Israeli family whose son (Yossi Vasa) is married to a Jewish-Ashkenazi-Israeli woman (Meyrav Feldman).
