= Six Acts (film) =

Six Acts (Shesh Peamim)
- Directed by: Jonathan Gurfinkel
- Screenplay by: Rona Segal
- Produced by: Udi Yerushalmy
- Starring: Sivan Levy
- Cinematography: Shark De-Mayo
- Edited by: Arik Leibovitz
- Distributed by: Films Distribution
- Release date: 2012
- Running time: 93 minutes
- Country: Israel
- Language: Hebrew

Six Acts (Originally released as Shesh Peamim and also referred to as S#x Acts) is a 2012 Israeli drama film directed by Jonathan Gurfinkel and written by Rona Segal. The film is set in Herzliya and shows six different encounters between a group of teenagers over the course of a few weeks. The film was produced by Tazfilm productions and funded by the Israeli Film Fund and Keshet Broadcasting.

== Plot summary ==
Naïve teen girl Gili (Sivan Levy) changes schools. She is determined to improve her inferior social status, so she hooks up with her new school's coolest guy, Tomer (Roy Nik). Her plan succeeds, and she takes pride in her ability to draw attention. Even when her crush passes her off to his friend, she is still flattered. But soon all of the boys become aware of Gili's reputation, and as each new encounter pushes her limits a little further, the line of consent begins to blur.

== Cast ==
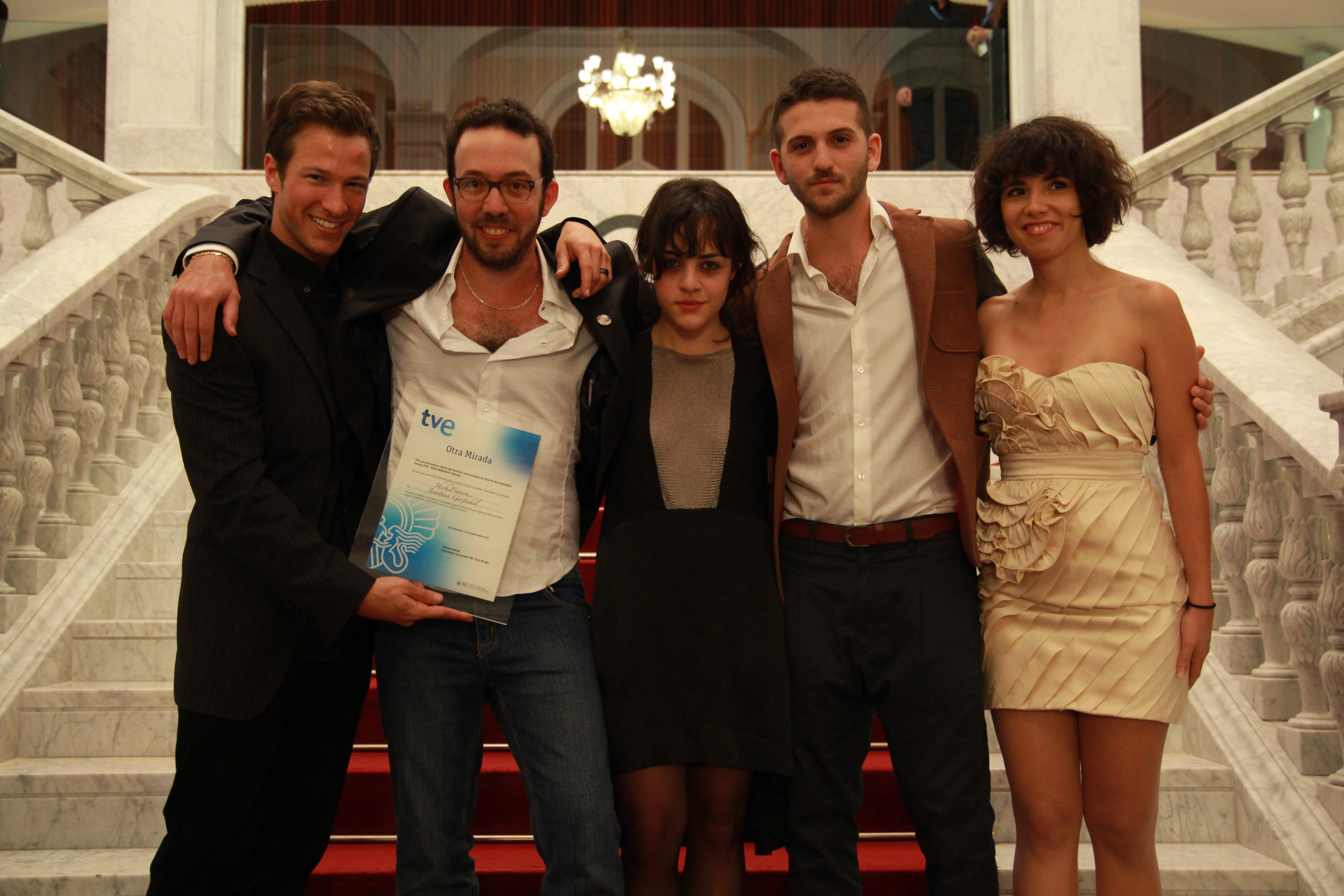
Eviatar Mor, Jonathan Gurfinkel, Sivan Levy, Roy Nik and Rona Segal during the San Sebastian Film Festival

Official cast:

- Sivan Levy - Gilli Shulman
- Eviatar Mor - Omri Stein
- Roy Nik - Tomer Rozenberg
- Niv Zilberberg - "Shabat"
- Ronit Yudkevitz - Omri's mother
- Eran Ivanir - Omri's father
- Meirav Gruber - Gilli's mother

== Production ==
After 3 years of writing, Six Acts was presented at the Jerusalem Film Festival Pitch Point 2010, where it won a Jury's special mention. Later that year, the Israeli Film Fund and Keshet Broadcasting decided to invest in Six Acts, and it was shot in the summer of 2011. The Shooting took place mainly around Herzliya and Ramat Hasharon. These locations are considered the fancy suburbs of Tel Aviv, and their appearance in the film plays a role of its own: "In this world of swimming pools, iPhones, glossy houses and daddy’s cars - this is Ramat Hasharon, but could be Malibu, Sydney, the South of France" (Screen International). In an Interview, director Jonathan Gurfinkel and screenwriter Rona Segal said they chose Nouveau riche surroundings in order to resonate the extensive Neo-liberal process Israel has gone through in the last few decades.

== Release ==
=== Festivals ===
- International premiere: San Sebastian Film Festival 2012 (New Directors).
- Israeli premiere: Haifa International Film Festival 2012 (Official Selection).
- North American premiere: Tribeca Film Festival 2013 (Official selection).
- Other premiers include Gothenburg Film Festival 2013, Edinburgh Film Festival 2013, Zlín Film Festival 2013, and others.

=== Distribution ===
Six Acts is represented by Films Distribution, and was bought for theatrical distribution in several markets, including Australia, Russia, CIS countries and Korea. The Israeli theatrical premiere is due October 2013.

== Reception ==
=== Critical response ===
On review aggregator website Rotten Tomatoes, the film has an approval rating of 69% based on 13 reviews, and an average rating of 6.4/10. On Metacritic, the film has a weighted average score of 67 out of 100, based on 7 critics, indicating "generally favorable reviews".

Six Acts was well received by critics. Fionnuala Halligan of Screen International called it an "Arresting debut", saying: "Six Acts is a completely universal film... If you don’t immediately recognize the people and situations on screen here, you’ve forgotten what it is to be 16. “ While at the Tribeca Film Festival, Complex chose Six Acts to open their Tribeca "Must-See" list, describing the film as a "“Bold, devastating look at the psyche of a 16-year-old who's just trying to be accepted, albeit in the most self-destructive ways possible". Sivan Levy's acting was described as a "Knockout performance". IndieWire was also praising Levy's performance, saying she had "unforgettably sharp features that suggest Bettie Page as a blade". Isaac Zablocki Huffington Post wrote: "Six Acts is both stylistically innovative as it captures a realism and represents a new lost generation similarly to Larry Clark's Kids.

=== Accolades ===
- Winner: San Sebastian Film Festival 2012 "Another Look" award by TVE. The jury found Six Acts to be "An open invitation for a social change
- Winner: Haifa International Film Festival 2012 Best Debut (Jonathan Gurfinkel)
- Winner: Haifa International Film Festival 2012 Best Screenplay (Rona Segal)
- Winner: Haifa International Film Festival 2012 Best Actress (Sivan Levy)
- Nominated: Tribeca Film Festival 2013 World's Narrative competition
- Jury's Special Mention: Jerusalem International Film Festival 2010 Pitch Point
- Jury's Special Mention: Tallinn Black Nights Film Festival 2013 for Actress in a leading role (Sivan Levy)
- Winner: Israeli Film Critics Association 2013 Best Screenplay (Rona Segal)
- Winner: Israeli Film Critics Association 2013 Best Actress (Sivan Levy)
- Nominated: Tribeca Film Festival 2013 World's Narrative competition
- Nominated: The Ophir Award - The Israeli equivalent to the oscar, 2013 Best feature film (Udi Yerushalmi) (Jonathan Gurfinkel)
- Nominated: The Ophir Award - The Israeli equivalent to the oscar, 2013 Best Director (Jonathan Gurfinkel)
- Winner: The Ophir Award - The Israeli equivalent to the oscar, 2013 Best Actress (Sivan Levy)
- Nominated: The Ophir Award - The Israeli equivalent to the oscar, 2013 Best Cinematography (Shark de Mayo)
- Nominated: The Ophir Award - The Israeli equivalent to the oscar, 2013 Best Screenplayr (Rona Segal)
- Nominated: The Ophir Award - The Israeli equivalent to the oscar, 2013 Best Editing (Arik Lahav Leibovich)
- Nominated: The Ophir Award - The Israeli equivalent to the oscar, 2013 Best Casting (Galit Eshkol)
- Nominated: The Ophir Award - The Israeli equivalent to the oscar, 2013 Best Production Design (Adam Kalderon)
- Nominated: The Ophir Award - The Israeli equivalent to the oscar, 2013 Best Costume Design (Adam Kalderon)
- Nominated: The Ophir Award - The Israeli equivalent to the oscar, 2013 Best Original Soundtrack Motti Hefetz, Itzik Cohen, Tomer Koren
