= Lisa Gornick =

British actress, screenwriter, film director, and producer

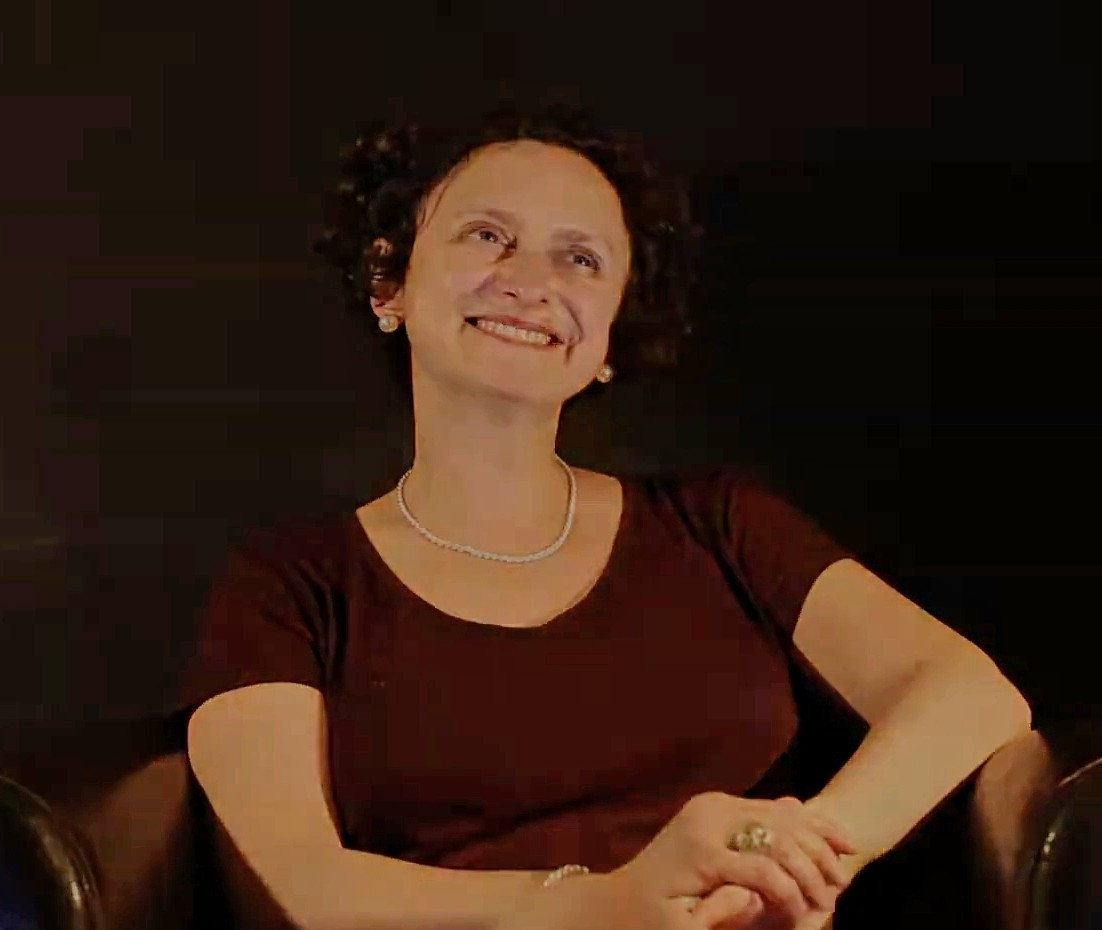
- Born: London, England
- Occupations: Producer; director; screenwriter; actress
- Years active: 2002–present

Lisa Gornick is a British filmmaker, performer, and visual artist. She works across film, live performance, drawing, and television. Gornick's practice is characterised by cross-platform productions that combine feature filmmaking with live drawing shows, in which she creates real-time projected drawings while narrating stories, playing music, and exploring themes of queerness, identity, and feminist politics. She is the writer, director, and producer of three micro-budget feature films, and has developed a body of solo live drawing shows that have been performed at venues including the Soho Theatre, the Edinburgh Fringe Festival (Gilded Balloon), the Barbican Cinema in London, and internationally at the Dortmund/Cologne International Women's Film Festival and the National Museum of Cinema, Turin.

== Work ==
Gornick's first feature film was Do I Love You?. It is set in London and revolves around the relationship between Marina (Gornick) and Romy (Raquel Cassidy). In 2014, the British Film Institute included the film in its Top 10 Greatest Movies About Lesbians.

Her second feature film, Tick Tock Lullaby is a comedy about the ambivalence around becoming a parent. In 2007, it screened at the San Francisco International LGBT Festival and the Cinequest Film Festival.

Gornick's third feature film, The Book of Gabrielle (2016), is a comedy-drama in which Gabrielle (Gornick), a female graphic artist, meets an established male erotic novelist. The film investigates the depiction of sex and gender from a female perspective. It premiered at the Barbican Cinema, London, and subsequently toured to Glasgow, Edinburgh, and other UK venues. The film was part of a multi-platform production that also included a live drawing show (What (the F**k) is Lesbian Film?), an Arts Council-funded book drawn and written by Gornick titled How To Do It.

Gornick's work for television includes the 2010 short film, Dip, which was made for the Channel 4's Coming Up Season and won the Youth Jury Award for Best Film at Oberhausen Film Festival 2011. Gornick co-starred in the film The Owls (Cheryl Dunye, 2010). She set up the production company Valiant Doll, which makes micro budget feature films.

Alongside her filmmaking, Gornick has developed a solo performance practice centred on live drawing shows. In these performances, she sits at a table with ink pens and drawing materials, narrating stories while creating drawings that are projected in real time onto a large screen, accompanied by music. She has described the form as a kind of "DIY cinema" — a handmade, live equivalent of filmmaking.

== Live drawing shows ==
=== Grandma Ray ===
Grandma Ray (2015) was Gornick's first live drawing show. It explores her relationship with her Jewish grandmother Rachel, an East End Londoner who had her own lesbian experiences in the 1920s, merging 1920s and 1990s London. The show was first performed at the Betsey Trotwood and the Soho Theatre before transferring to the Edinburgh Fringe Festival (Gilded Balloon). It received four stars from The Scotsman.

=== What (the F**k) is Lesbian Film? ===
What (the F**k) is Lesbian Film? (2017) is a live drawing show examining Gornick's identity as a lesbian filmmaker, drawing on film history and her own experience. It premiered at the Barbican Cinema, London, and subsequently toured to Kino Babylon, Berlin; Filmhouse Northampton; the National Museum of Cinema, Turin; the Dortmund/Cologne International Women's Film Festival; and Komedia, Brighton.

=== The Many Faces of Eve ===
The Many Faces of Eve is a live drawing performance inspired by the 1950 film All About Eve, directed by Joseph L. Mankiewicz. Using pen, pastel, watercolour, voice, and music, Gornick builds her own response to the film, revisiting and redrawing its narratives around fame, age, and the expectations placed on women.

=== Drawing on the Bottle ===
Drawing on the Bottle (2024) is an autobiographical show about Gornick's relationship with alcohol. It premiered at Camden People's Theatre in 2024 as part of Camden Roar, and returned there in April 2025. Green Room Reviews described it as transporting "the audience through some of life's most poignant moments" in the space of an hour.

=== The Collected Live Drawing Shows of Lisa Gornick ===
In March 2026, Omnibus Theatre in Clapham, London, presented a week-long retrospective titled The Collected Live Drawing Shows of Lisa Gornick, featuring five shows over four days: Grandma Ray, Drawing on the Bottle, What (the F**k) is Lesbian Film?, The Many Faces of Eve, and How To Do It.

=== The Day in the Life of a Beaver ===
The Day in the Life of a Beaver (2026) interweaves human stories with ecology and natural history to explore the return of the beaver to the UK after 400 years of extinction. The drawing show is accompanied by an art installation as part of Proposition Studios' Keystone Species exhibition.

== Filmography ==
Actress
Year	Title	Role	Notes
2002	Do I Love You?	Marina	
2007	Tick Tock Lullaby	Sasha	
2010	The Owls	Lily	
2015	Woman in Gold	Frau Neumann	
2016	The Book of Gabrielle	Gabrielle	

Writer / director
Year	Title	Role	Notes
2002	Do I Love You?	Director, writer, producer	Best Feature Film award at Paris Lesbian and Feminist Film Festival
2005	Bed of Fear	Short, director	
2007	Tick Tock Lullaby	Writer, producer	Best New Director at the Seattle International Lesbian and Gay Film Festival; Audience Award for Best Feature at Cineffable Film Festival, Paris; Jury Award for Best Feature at Mezipatra Film Festival, Prague.
2009	140	Documentary, segment director	
2010	Coming Up	Director, "Dip"	Youth Jury Award for Best Film at Oberhausen International Short Film Festival (2011)
2016	The Book of Gabrielle	Director, writer, producer	

== See also ==
- List of female film and television directors
- List of lesbian filmmakers
- List of LGBT-related films directed by women
