= Veronica Kedar =

Israeli director, producer and screenwriter

- רוני קידר
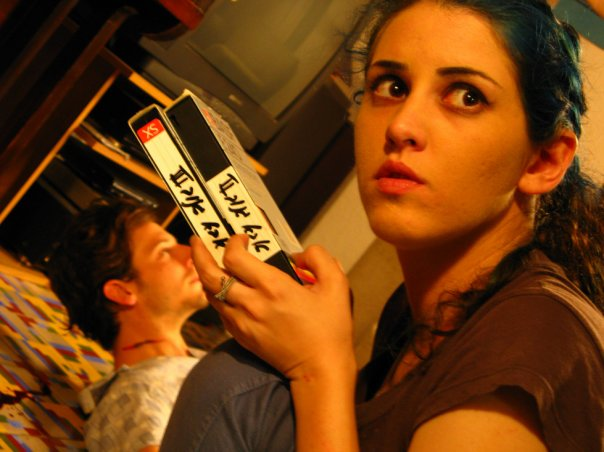
- Born: Veronica Kedar; 27 April 1984 (age 41)
- Occupations: Director, Producer, Screenwriter, Editor, Actress
- Years active: 2007-present

Veronica Kedar (Hebrew: רוני קידר; born 27 April 1984) is an Israeli director, producer, screenwriter and actress.

== Biography ==
Veronica Kedar studied film at the Beit Berl College of Arts. Her graduation film, Tail, won the Promising Director Award at the International Student Film Festival in Tel Aviv and a special screenwriting grant at the Up & Coming Film Festival in Germany 2010.

Kedar's debut feature, Joe & Belle, played at numerous film festivals and was nominated for Best Picture at the Israeli Academy Awards 2012. Kedar received an Excellence Award from the Israeli Ministry of Culture for her contribution to independent cinema in Israel.

In 2013, Kedar shot her experimental feature film, Endtime in one night. The film premiered at the Sitges Film Festival.

Kedar's next feature film Family, premiered at the Jerusalem Film Festival in July 2017. The film was nominated for three Israeli Academy Awards.

In 2024, Kedar released her fourth feature film Day Trippers starring Bafta Breakthrough winner Nell Barlow and Naama Amit, and her short animated film Kasey Cartoon.

== Films ==
Year	Title	Writer	Director	Producer	Notes
2007	Romantic Comedy	✓	✓		Short Film
2008	Tail	✓	✓		Short Film
2011	Joe + Belle	✓	✓	✓	Feature Film
2012	Bunny Love		✓	✓	Short Film
2014	Endtime	✓	✓	✓	Feature Film
2015	Fake It	✓			Short film
2016	The Woman Who Wanted To Kill Someone		✓	✓	Short Film
2017	Family	✓	✓		Feature Film
2024	Day Trippers	✓	✓	✓	Feature Film
2024	Kasey Cartoon	✓	✓	✓	Short Film
