= Bernard Verley =

French actor and producer (1939–2026)

- Born: 4 October 1939; Lille, France
- Died: 27 September 2026 (aged 86); Tréguier, France
- Occupations: Actor, producer
- Years active: 1961–2026

Bernard Verley (4 October 1939 – 27 September 2026) was a French actor and producer.

== Life and career ==
A student of les Beaux-Arts in Lille, Verley joined the TNP Jean Vilar. In the mid-1970s, he devoted himself to film production and then returned to acting in the 1990s, after a break of nine years.

Verley died in Tréguier on 27 September 2026, at the age of 86. His brother, Renaud Verley, is also an actor.

== Filmography ==
=== Actor ===
Year	Title	Role	Director	Notes
1961	Napoleon II, the Eagle	Napoleon II	Claude Boissol	
1961	Les honneurs de la guerre	Gérard	Jean Dewever	
1961	La petite Dorrit	Arthur	Pierre Badel	TV movie
1962	Gavroche	Marius	Alain Boudet	TV movie
1963	Le général Dourakine	Prince Roman Pojarsky	Yves-André Hubert	TV movie
1963	Jean Valjean	Marius	Alain Boudet	TV movie
1964	Love at Sea	Geneviève's friend	Guy Gilles	
1964	Games of Desire	Martin	Hans Albin & Peter Berneis	
1965	David Copperfield	David Copperfield	Marcel Cravenne	TV movie
1967	The Secret of Wilhelm Storitz	Adrien Désormeaux	Éric Le Hung	TV movie
1968	La fille d'en face	Marek	Jean-Daniel Simon	
1968	Au pan coupé	Pierre	Guy Gilles	
1968	Les cracks	Lelièvre	Alex Joffé	
1968	Hassan Terro	The lieutenant of paratroopers	Mohammed Lakhdar-Hamina	
1968	Bérénice	Titus	Pierre-Alain Jolivet	
1968	Les hauts de Hurlevent	Edgar Linton	Jean-Paul Carrère	TV movie
1968	Ambroise Paré	Thierry	Éric Le Hung & Jacques Trébouta	TV movie
1968	Affaire Vilain contre Ministère public	Jean Vilain	Robert Guez	TV series (19 episodes)
1969	The Milky Way	Jesus	Luis Buñuel	
1969	La passion d'Anne-Catherine Emmerich	The rider / The devil	Michel Subiela	TV movie
1971	Une femme libre	Jacques	Claude Pierson	
1972	Love in the Afternoon	Frédéric Carrelet	Éric Rohmer	
1973	Le feu aux lèvres	Gabriel	Pierre Kalfon	
1973	Le monde enchanté d'Isabelle	The master	Youri	TV series (13 episodes)
1974	The Phantom of Liberty	Judge	Luis Buñuel	
1974	La Bonzesse	Jean-Pierre	François Jouffa	
1974	Eugène Sue	Eugène Sue	Jacques Nahum	TV movie
1974	L'amour triste	Julien	François Martin	TV movie
1974	Le baquet de Frédéric-Antoine Mesmer	Frédéric-Antoine Mesmer	Michel Subiela	TV movie
1976	Les mal partis	Monsieur Leterrand	Sébastien Japrisot	
1978	Madame Bovary	Swiss Guard	Daniele D'Anza	TV mini-series
1981	Asphalte	The friend of Montpellier	Denis Amar	
1990	Pacific Palisades	Cameo	Bernard Schmitt	
1991	Nord	Michel	Xavier Beauvois	
1992	The Accompanist	Jacques Ceniat	Claude Miller	
1993	Hélas pour moi	Abraham Klimt	Jean-Luc Godard	
1993	Une nouvelle vie	Ludovic	Olivier Assayas	
1993	Taxi de nuit	The inspector	Serge Leroy	
1994	La Reine Margot	The Cardinal	Patrice Chéreau	
1994	À la folie	Sanders	Diane Kurys	
1994	The Smile	The aunt	Claude Miller	
1994	L'ange noir	Pitot	Jean-Claude Brisseau	
1994	Something Fishy	Noel Vaxelaire	Tonie Marshall	
1994	La folie douce	Landrieu	Frédéric Jardin	
1994	La trêve	The gasoil station tender	Emmanuel Paulin	Short
1994	Un été à l'envers	Louis	Roger Guillot	TV movie
1994	Police Secrets	Lessner	Alain Tasma	TV series (1 episode)
1995	Élisa	The contractor	Jean Becker	
1995	Dis-moi oui...	Lawyer Rodier	Alexandre Arcady	
1995	Le blanc à lunettes	Georges Bodet	Édouard Niermans	TV movie
1995	Pasteur, cinq années de rage	Professor Peter	Luc Béraud	TV movie
1995	Un si bel orage	Marquis of Tallert	Jean-Daniel Verhaeghe	TV movie
1995	Fils de flic	Inspector Jacques Meyer	Igaal Niddam	TV movie
1995	La duchesse de Langeais	Marquis of Ranquerailles	Jean-Daniel Verhaeghe	TV movie
1995	L'auberge de la Jamaïque	The priest	Gilles Béhat	TV movie
1995	La Rivière Espérance	Arsène Lombard	Josée Dayan	TV mini-series
1995	Cycle Simenon	Monsieur Stil	Claire Devers	TV series (1 episode)
1995	Regards d'enfance	The architect	Jean-Daniel Verhaeghe	TV series (1 episode)
1995–1997	Avocat d'office	Adrien Moretti	Gabriel Aghion, Bernard Stora, ...	TV series (3 episodes)
1996	Les liens du coeur	Gaspard	Josée Dayan	TV movie
1996	Dans un grand vent de fleurs	Guillaume Garlande	Gérard Vergez	TV mini-series
1996	Julie Lescaut	Maudry	Josée Dayan	TV series (1 episode)
1996	Strangers	Jacques Newborne / Neyrat	Rémy Duchemin	TV series (2 episodes)
1997	Lucie Aubrac	Charles-Henri	Claude Berri	
1997	La femme du cosmonaute	Head of Mission	Jacques Monnet	
1997	Compagnons secrets	Arcole	Pierre Beuchot	TV movie
1997	Les braconniers de Belledombre	Alain	Philippe Triboit	TV movie
1997	Le Rouge et Le Noir	Monsieur de Rénal	Jean-Daniel Verhaeghe	TV movie
1997	Les Cordier, juge et flic	Joseph Cohen	Alain Wermus	TV series (1 episode)
1998	White Lies	Jeanne's father	Pierre Salvadori	
1998	Les rives du paradis	Philippe Saint-Brice	Robin Davis	TV movie
1998	Les insoumis	Léo Soriano	Gérard Marx	TV movie
1998	Un cadeau, la vie !	Armand Boivin	Jacob Berger	TV movie
1998	Les brumes de Manchester	Inspector Garreau	Jean-Daniel Verhaeghe	TV movie
1998	The Violent Earth	Hippocrates	Michael Offer	TV mini-series
1998	Commandant Nerval	Colonel Deleuze	Arnaud Sélignac	TV series (2 episodes)
1999	The Color of Lies	Inspector Loudun	Claude Chabrol	
1999	The Dilettante	André Ackerman	Pascal Thomas	
1999	Recto/Verso	Maurice	Jean-Marc Longval	
1999	Les complices	Pierre Lambert	Serge Moati	TV movie
1999	Les terres froides	Monsieur Chamblasse	Sébastien Lifshitz	TV movie
1999	Jésus	Pontius Pilate	Serge Moati	TV movie
1999	Premier de cordée	Doctor Coutaz	Pierre-Antoine Hiroz & Édouard Niermans	TV movie
1999–2002	Marc Eliot	Thomas Perez	Josée Dayan & Williams Crépin	TV series (2 episodes)
2000	Taking Wing	French teacher	Steve Suissa	
2000	Les frères Soeur	James	Frédéric Jardin	
2000	Josephine, Guardian Angel	Pierre	Philippe Monnier	TV series (1 episode)
2000–2001	Mathieu Corot	Walemme	Pascale Dallet	TV series (3 episodes)
2001	CQ	Trailer Voiceover Actor	Roman Coppola	
2001	L'aîné des Ferchaux	Gilles Ferchaux	Bernard Stora	TV movie
2001	Vent de poussières	Alain Chastelou	Renaud Bertrand	TV movie
2001	Des nouvelles des enfants	Lucien	Daniel Janneau	TV movie
2002–2007	Malone	Malone	Franck Apprederis & Didier Le Pêcheur	TV series (6 episodes)
2003	Les Marins perdus	Mariette's father	Claire Devers	
2003	Au sud des nuages	Adrien	Jean-François Amiguet	
2003	Le Bleu de l'océan	Charles Delcourt	Didier Albert	TV mini-series
2004	Les parallèles	Edgar Duchey	Nicolas Saada	Short
2005	Mon petit doigt m'a dit...	The General	Pascal Thomas	
2005	La battante	Charles Fournier	Didier Albert	TV mini-series
2006	Lady Chatterley	Sir Malcolm	Pascale Ferran	
2006	Le grand appartement	Monsieur Rippert	Pascal Thomas	
2008	Sans état d'âme	Richard	Vincenzo Marano	
2008	Mitterrand à Vichy	François Mitterrand's father	Serge Moati	
2008	Les tricheurs	Manuel Escriva	Laurent Carcélès	TV series (1 episode)
2009	Villa Belle France	Julien	Karim Akadiri Soumaïla	TV movie
2009	Un flic	Louis Korn	Patrick Dewolf	TV series (1 episode)
2009–2015	Mes amis, mes amours, mes emmerdes	Jean-Charles	Jérôme Navarro, Sylvie Ayme, ...	TV series (20 episodes)
2011	Ma compagne de nuit	Julia's father	Isabelle Brocard	
2011	V comme Vian	Gaston Gallimard	Philippe Le Guay	TV movie
2012	In a Rush	BonP	Louis-Do de Lencquesaing	
2012	An Open Heart	Masson	Marion Laine	
2012	Associés contre le crime	The General	Pascal Thomas	
2013	Another Life	The doctor	Emmanuel Mouret	
2013	Retenir les ciels	Maurice	Clara & Laura Laperrousaz	Short
2013	15 jours ailleurs	Father Vincent	Didier Bivel	TV movie
2014	Tiens-toi droite	Man board 1	Katia Lewkowicz	
2014	Un Passage d'eau	Marcel	Louise Hervé & Chloé Maillet	Short
2014	Origines	Charles Manin	Jérôme Navarro	TV series (1 episode)
2015	The Great Game	The General	Nicolas Pariser	
2016	L'indomptée	The director	Caroline Deruas-Garrel	
2017	Rodin	Victor Hugo	Jacques Doillon	
2017	Number One	Jean Archambault	Tonie Marshall	
2017	Les fausses confidences	Monsieur Rémy	Luc Bondy	TV movie
2018	By the Grace of God	Bernard Preynat	François Ozon	
2018	Cajou	The old	Claude Le Pape	Short
2018	Crime dans le Luberon	Lucien Issautier	Éric Duret	TV movie
2019	Quand sort la recluse	Vessac	Josée Dayan	TV movie
2019	Noces d'or	Octave	Nader T. Homayoun	TV movie
2019	L'héritage	Christophe Perrin	Laurent Dussaux	TV movie

=== Producer ===
Year	Title	Director	Notes
1978	La terre au ventre	Tony Gatlif	
1986	Pékin Central	Camille de Casabianca	
1990	Pacific Palisades	Bernard Schmitt	
1990	Le pinceau à lèvres	Bruno Chiche	Short
1991	Nord	Xavier Beauvois	
1993	La nage indienne	Xavier Durringer	
1994	Rosine	Christine Carrière	
1994–1995	3000 scénarios contre un virus	Cédric Klapisch, Jane Birkin, ...	TV series (31 episodes)
1995	Patrice Chéreau, Pascal Greggory, une autre solitude	Stéphane Metge	Documentary

== Theater ==
Year	Title	Author	Director	Notes
1962	Les Témoins	Georges Soria	Roger Mollien	
1963	Trencavel	Robert Collon	Jean Mercure	
1964	The Star Turns Red	Seán O'Casey	Gabriel Garran	
1965	Danton ou la Mort de la République	Romain Rolland	Jean Deschamps	
1969	Le Distrait	Jean-François Regnard	Gabriel Garran	
1971	On ne badine pas avec l'amour	Alfred de Musset	Pierre Della Torre	
1972	La Chatte sur les rails	Josef Topol	Jaromir Knittl	
1973	Long Day's Journey into Night	Eugene O'Neill	Georges Wilson	
1991–1992	Time and the Room	Botho Strauß	Patrice Chéreau	
1999	La Controverse de Valladolid	Jean-Claude Carrière	Jacques Lassalle	
2000	Medea	Euripides	Jacques Lassalle	
2001	Weekends Quartet	Gao Xingjian	Jacques Rosner	
2001	Itinéraire bis	Xavier Daugreilh	Stéphan Meldegg	
2002	La Griffe (A 71)	Claude d'Anna & Laure Bonin	Annick Blancheteau	
2003	Embers	Sándor Márai	Didier Long	
2004	La Ronde	Arthur Schnitzler	Frédéric Bélier-Garcia	
2005	Sweet Bird of Youth	Tennessee Williams	Philippe Adrien	
2006	Conversations après un enterrement	Yasmina Reza	Gabriel Garran	
2007	The Dance of Death	August Strindberg	Hans Peter Cloos	
2010–2012	Dream of Autumn	Jon Fosse	Patrice Chéreau	Nominated - Molière Award for Best Supporting Actor
2014	Les Fausses Confidences	Pierre de Marivaux	Luc Bondy	
