= 30th Moscow International Film Festival =

Film festival

- Location: Moscow, Russia
- Founded: 1959
- Awards: Grand Prix
- Festival date: 19–28 June 2008
- Website: Website

The 30th Moscow International Film Festival was held from 19 to 28 June 2008. The Golden George was awarded to the Iranian film As Simple as That directed by Reza Mirkarimi.

== Jury ==
- Liv Ullmann (Norway – Chairman of the Jury)
- Michael Glawogger (Austria)
- Irina Rozanova (Russia)
- Derek Malcolm (Great Britain)
- Sebastián Alarcón (Chile)

== Films in competition ==
The following films were selected for the main competition:

English title	Original title	Director(s)	Production country
Absurdistan	Absurdistan	Veit Helmer	Germany
The War of the Shore	Duiande zhangzheng	Li Xin	China
Zift	Zift	Javor Gardev	Bulgaria
For My Father	Sof Shavua B'Tel Aviv	Dror Zahavi	Israel
Days and Clouds	Giorni e nuvole	Silvio Soldini	Italy
The Moon and Other Lovers	Der Mond und andere Liebhaber	Bernd Böhlich	Germany
Mao Tse Tung	Mao Ce Dun	Besnik Bisha	Albania
The Quiet Storm	Veðramót	Guðný Halldórsdóttir	Iceland
Once Upon a Time in the Provinces	Odnazhdy v provintsii	Katya Shagalova	Russia
The Visitor	The Visitor	Tom McCarthy	United States
Virtually a Virgin	Majdnem szüz	Péter Bacsó	Hungary
Awaking from a Dream	Amanecer de un sueño	Freddy Mas Franqueza	Spain
A Simple Heart	Un cœur simple	Marion Laine	France
As Simple as That	Be hamin sadegi	Reza Mirkarimi	Iran
Birds of Paradise	Rayskie ptitsy	Roman Balayan	Ukraine
The Cherry Orchard	Sad	Sergei Ovcharov	Russia

== Awards ==
- Golden George: As Simple as That by Reza Mirkarimi
- Special Jury Prize: Silver George: A Simple Heart by Marion Laine
- Silver George:
  - Best Director: Javor Gardev for Zift
  - Best Actor : Richard Jenkins for The Visitor
  - Best Actress : Margherita Buy for Days and Clouds
- Silver George for the best film of the Perspective competition: Cumbia Connection by Rene U. Villareal
- Lifetime Achievement Award: Takeshi Kitano
- Stanislavsky Award: Isabelle Huppert
- FIPRESCI Prize: Once Upon a Time in the Provinces by Katya Shagalova
- Russian Critics Jury's Prize for Best Film in-competition: As Simple as That by Reza Mirkarimi
