= Juliette Binoche =

French actress (born 1964)

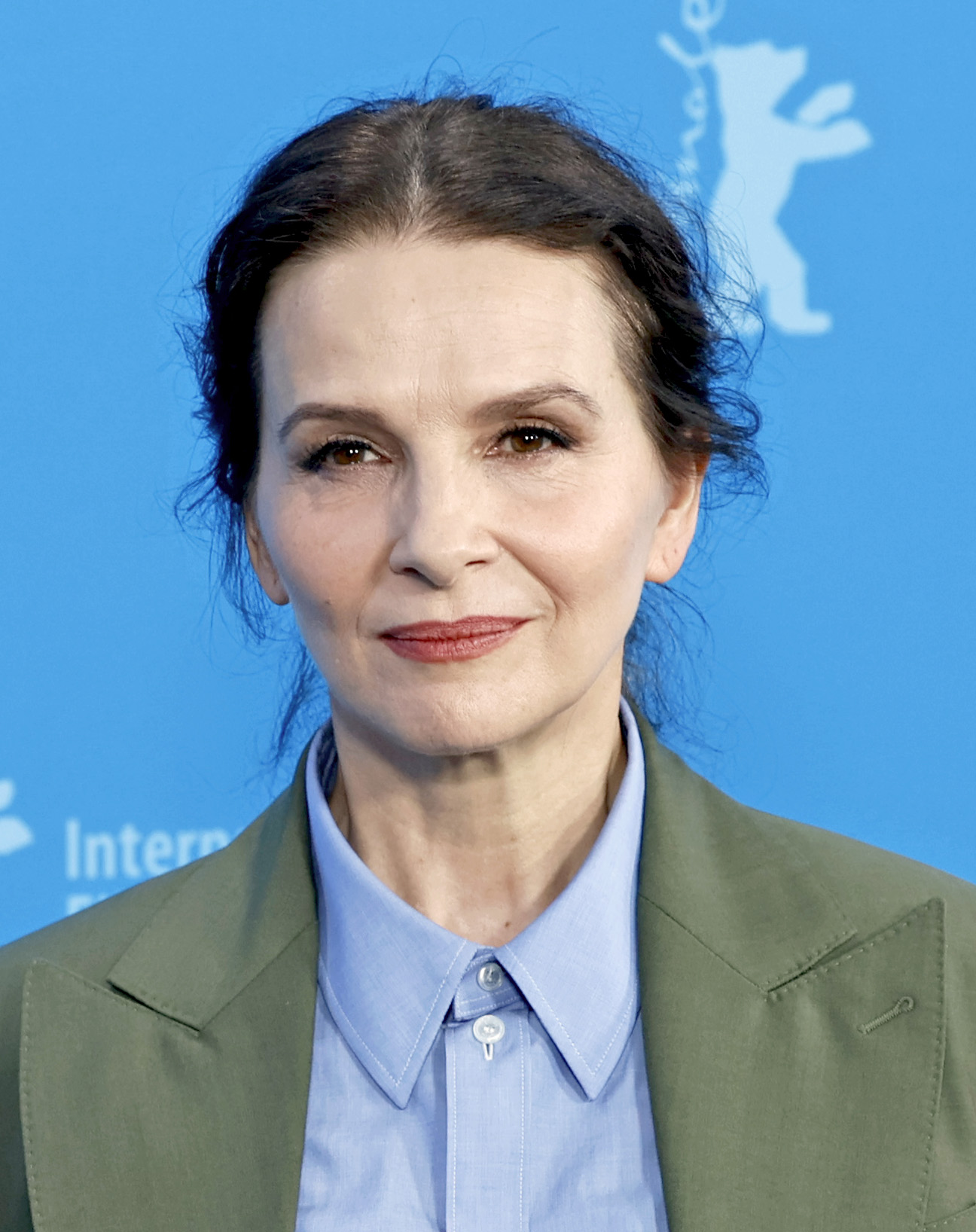
- Binoche at the 2026 Berlinale
- Born: 9 March 1964 (age 62); Paris, France
- Other name: "La Binoche"
- Education: Conservatoire national supérieur d'art dramatique
- Occupation: Actress
- Years active: 1983–present
- Partners: André Halle (1992–1995); Benoît Magimel (1998–2003)
- Children: 2
- Relatives: Léon Binoche (great-uncle)
- Awards: Full list

Juliette Binoche (French: [ʒyljɛt binɔʃ]; born 9 March 1964) is a French actress. She has appeared in more than 60 films, particularly in French and English, and has been the recipient of numerous accolades, including an Academy Award, a BAFTA Award and a César Award, and is one of only two women (Note: Along with Julianne Moore.) to have won an acting award at each of the world's three major film festivals (the Volpi Cup, the Silver Bear for Best Actress and the Cannes Film Festival Award for Best Actress).

Binoche first gained recognition for working with such auteur directors as Jean-Luc Godard (Hail Mary, 1985), Jacques Doillon (Family Life, 1985), and André Téchiné; the latter made her a star in France with a leading role in his drama Rendez-vous (1985). She won the Volpi Cup and César Award for Best Actress for her performance as a grieving music composer in Krzysztof Kieślowski's Three Colours: Blue (1993), and the Academy Award for Best Supporting Actress for playing a nurse in The English Patient (1996). For starring in the romantic film Chocolat (2000), Binoche received a nomination for the Academy Award for Best Actress. In 2010, she won the Cannes Film Festival Award for Best Actress for her role as an antiques dealer in Abbas Kiarostami's Certified Copy. Binoche has since starred in such films as Clouds of Sils Maria (2014), High Life (2018), The Taste of Things (2023), and The Return (2024).

Binoche has appeared on stage intermittently, most notably in a 1998 London theatre production of Luigi Pirandello's Naked and in a 2000 Broadway production of Harold Pinter's Betrayal for which she was nominated for the Tony Award for Best Actress in a Play. In 2008, she began a world tour with a modern dance production, in-i, devised in collaboration with Akram Khan.

== Early life ==
Binoche was born in Paris, the daughter of Jean-Marie Binoche, a director, actor, and sculptor, and Monique Yvette Stalens (born 1939), a teacher, director, and actress. Her father, who is French, also has one eighth Portuguese-Brazilian ancestry; he was raised partly in Morocco by his French-born parents. Her mother was born in Częstochowa, Poland. Binoche's maternal grandfather, Andre Stalens, was born in Poland, of Belgian (Walloon) and French descent, and Binoche's maternal grandmother, Julia Helena Młynarczyk, was of Polish origin. Both of them were actors who were born in Częstochowa; the German Nazi occupiers imprisoned them at Auschwitz as intellectuals.

Her great-uncle was Léon Binoche, who won a gold medal in rugby at the 1900 Paris Olympics.

When Binoche's parents divorced in 1968, four-year-old Juliette and her sister Marion were sent to a provincial boarding school. During their teens, the Binoche sisters spent their school holidays with their maternal grandmother, not seeing their parents for months at a time. Binoche has stated that this perceived parental abandonment had a profound effect on her.

She was not particularly academic and in her teenage years began acting at school in amateur stage productions. At seventeen, she directed and starred in a student production of the Eugène Ionesco play, Exit the King. She studied acting at the Conservatoire National Supérieur d'Art Dramatique (CNSAD), but quit after a short time as she disliked the curriculum. In the early 1980s, she found an agent through a friend and joined a theater troupe, touring France, Belgium and Switzerland under the pseudonym "Juliette Adrienne". Around this time, she began lessons with acting coach Vera Gregh.

Her first professional screen experience came as an extra in the three-part TF1 television series Dorothée, danseuse de corde (1983) directed by Jacques Fansten, followed by a similarly small role in the provincial television film Fort bloque directed by Pierrick Guinnard. After this, Binoche secured her first feature-film appearance with a minor role in Pascal Kané's Liberty Belle (1983). Her role required just two days on-set, but was enough to inspire Binoche to pursue a career in film.

== Career ==
=== 1984–1991 ===
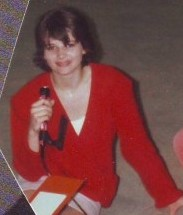
Binoche in 1985

Binoche's early films established her as a French star of some renown. In 1983, she auditioned for the female lead in Jean-Luc Godard's controversial Hail Mary, a modern retelling of the Virgin birth. Godard requested a meeting with Binoche having seen a photo of her taken by her boyfriend at the time. Although she said she spent six months on the film's set in Geneva, her presence in the final cut is confined to just a few scenes. Further supporting roles followed in a variety of French films. Annick Lanoë's Les Nanas gave Binoche her most noteworthy role to date, playing opposite established stars Marie-France Pisier and Macha Méril in a mainstream comedy, though she has stated the experience was not particularly memorable or influential. She gained more significant exposure in Jacques Doillon's critically acclaimed Family Life cast as the volatile teenage step-daughter of Sami Frey's central character. This film was to set the tone of her early career. Doillon has commented that in the original screenplay her character was written to be 14 years old, but he was so impressed with Binoche's audition he changed the character's age to 17 to allow her take the role. In April 1985, Binoche followed this with another supporting role in Bob Decout's Adieu Blaireau, a policier thriller starring Philippe Léotard and Annie Girardot. Adieu Blaireau failed to have much impact with critics or audiences.

It was to be later in 1985 that Binoche would fully emerge as a leading actress with her role in André Téchiné's Rendez-vous. She was cast at short notice when Sandrine Bonnaire had to abandon the film due to a scheduling conflict. Rendez-vous premiered at the 1985 Cannes Film Festival, winning Best Director. The film was a sensation and Binoche became the darling of the festival. Rendez-Vous is the story of a provincial actress, Nina (Binoche), who arrives in Paris and embarks on a series of dysfunctional liaisons with several men, including the moody, suicidal Quentin (Lambert Wilson). However it is her collaboration with theater director Scrutzler, played by Jean-Louis Trintignant, which comes to define Nina. In a review of Rendez-Vous in Film Comment, Armond White described it as "Juliette Binoche's career-defining performance".

In 1986, Binoche was nominated for her first César for Best Actress in a Leading Role for her performance in the film. Following Rendez-Vous, she was unsure of what role to take next. She auditioned unsuccessfully for Yves Boisset's Bleu comme l'enfer and Robin Davis's Hors la loi, but was eventually cast in My Brother-in-Law Killed My Sister (1986) by Jacques Rouffio opposite the popular French stars Michel Serrault and Michel Piccoli. This film was a critical and commercial failure. Binoche has commented that Rouffio's film is very significant to her career as it taught her to judge roles based on the quality of the screenplay and her connection with a director, not on the reputation of other cast members. Later in 1986, she again starred opposite Michel Piccoli in Leos Carax's Mauvais Sang. This film was a critical and commercial success, leading to Binoche's second César nomination. Mauvais Sang is an avant-garde thriller in which she plays Anna the vastly younger lover of Marc (Piccoli) who falls in love with Alex (Denis Lavant), a young thief. Binoche has stated that she "discovered the camera" while shooting this film.

In August 1986, Binoche began filming Philip Kaufman's adaptation of Milan Kundera's novel The Unbearable Lightness of Being, portraying the young and innocent Tereza. Released in 1988, this was Binoche's first English language role and was a worldwide success with critics and audiences alike. Set against the USSR's invasion of Prague in 1968, the film tells the story of the relationships a Czech surgeon, Tomas (Daniel Day-Lewis), has with his wife Tereza and his lover Sabina (Lena Olin). Binoche has stated that at the time her English was very limited and that she relied on a French translation to fully grasp her role. After this success, Binoche decided to return to France rather than pursue an international career. In 1988, she filmed the lead in Pierre Pradinas's Un tour de manège, a little-seen French film opposite François Cluzet. She has stated that her attraction to this film was that it gave her the opportunity to work with close friends and family. Pradinas is the husband of her sister Marion Stalens who was set photographer on the film and appeared in a cameo role. In the summer of 1988, Binoche returned to the stage in an acclaimed production of Anton Chekhov's The Seagull directed by Russian director Andrei Konchalovsky at Théâtre de l'Odéon in Paris.

Later that year, she began work on Leos Carax's Les Amants du Pont-Neuf. The film was beset by problems and took three years to complete, requiring investment from three producers and funds from the French government. When finally released in 1991, Les Amants du Pont-Neuf was a critical success. Binoche won a European Film Award as well as securing her third César nomination for her performance. In the film Binoche portrays an artist who lives rough on the famous Parisian bridge where she meets another young vagrant (Denis Lavant). This iconic part of the city becomes the backdrop for a wildly passionate love story and some of the most visually arresting images of the city ever created. The paintings featured in the film were Binoche's own work. She also designed the French poster for the film which features an ink drawing of the eponymous lovers locked in embrace. During a break in filming in 1990, Binoche spent five days shooting Mara for Mike Figgis, based on Henry Miller's Quiet Days in Clichy. This 30-minute film was part of HBO's anthology series Women & Men 2. The film became somewhat contentious when, according to Mike Figgis, HBO altered it once he had completed it. The film premiered on HBO in the U.S. on 18 August 1991.

At this point, Binoche seemed to be at a crossroads in her career. She was recognized as one of the most significant French actresses of her generation. However, the long production of Les Amants du Pont-Neuf had forced her to turn down several significant roles in international productions including The Double Life of Véronique by Krzysztof Kieślowski, Cyrano de Bergerac by Jean-Paul Rappeneau, Night and Day by Chantal Akerman, and Beyond the Aegean, an aborted project with Elia Kazan. Binoche then chose to pursue an international career outside France.

=== 1992–2000 ===
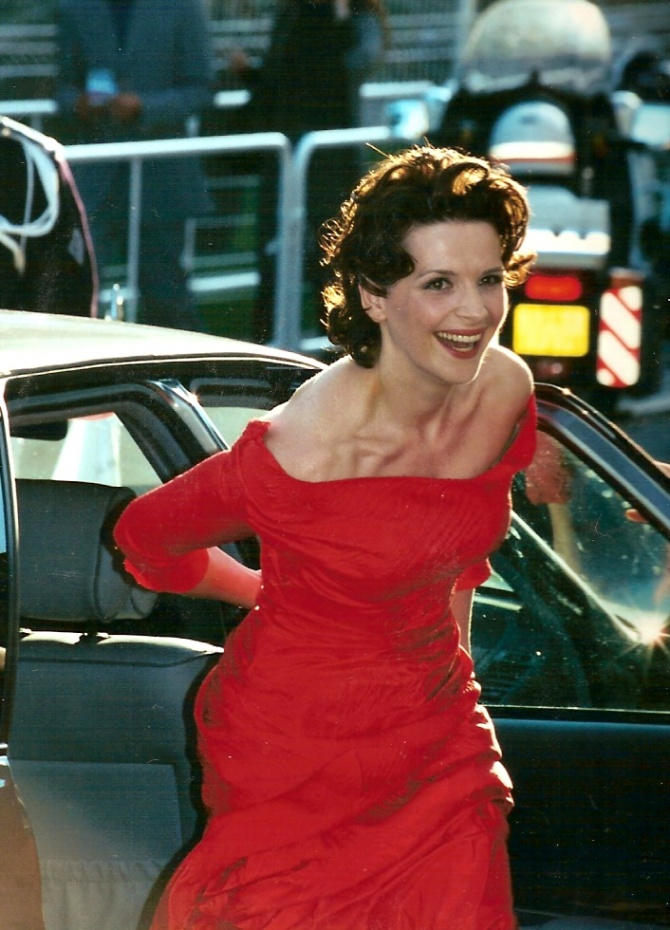
Binoche at the 2000 Cannes Film Festival

In the 1990s, Binoche was cast in a series of critically and commercially successful international films, winning her praise and awards. In this period, her persona developed from that of a young gamine to a more melancholic, tragic presence. Critics suggested that many of her roles were notable for her almost passive intensity in the face of tragedy and despair. In fact, Binoche has nicknamed her characters from this period as her "sorrowful sisters". Following the long shoot of Les Amants du Pont-Neuf, Binoche relocated to London for the 1992 productions of Emily Brontë's Wuthering Heights and Damage, both of which considerably enhanced her international reputation. Yet, from a professional and personal point of view, both films were significant challenges for Binoche; her casting opposite Ralph Fiennes's Heathcliff in Wuthering Heights, instead of English actresses Helena Bonham Carter and Kate Beckinsale, was immediately contentious and drew derision from the British press, unimpressed that a uniquely English role had gone to a French actress. The film had its world premiere at the 1992 Edinburgh International Film Festival. Reviews were poor, with Binoche being cynically dubbed "Cathy Clouseau" and derided for her "franglais" accent. Both Binoche and director Peter Kosminsky distanced themselves from the film, with Binoche refusing to do any promotion for the film or to redub it into French.

Damage, a UK and French co-production, is the story of a British Conservative minister played by Jeremy Irons who embarks on a torrid affair with his son's fiancée (Binoche). Based on the novel by Josephine Hart and directed by veteran French director Louis Malle, Damage seemed to be the ideal international vehicle for Binoche; however the production was fraught with difficulties and dogged by rumours of serious conflict. In an on-set interview, Malle stated that it was the "most difficult" film he had ever made, while Binoche commented that "the first day was one big argument". Damage opened in the UK late in 1992 and debuted early in 1993 on US screens. Reviews were somewhat mixed. For her performance, Binoche received her fourth César nomination.

In 1993, she appeared in Krzysztof Kieślowski's Three Colours: Blue to much critical acclaim. The first film in a trilogy inspired by the ideals of the French republic and the colors of its flag, Three Colors: Blue is the story of a young woman who loses her composer husband and daughter in a car accident. Though devastated she learns to cope by rejecting her previous life in favor of conscious "nothing"; rejecting all people, belongings and emotions. Three Colours: Blue premiered at the 1993 Venice Film Festival, landing Binoche the Best Actress Prize. She also won a César, and a nomination for the Golden Globe. Binoche has said her inspirations for the role were her friend and coach Vernice Klier who suffered a similar tragedy, and the book The Black Veil by Anny Duperey which deals with the author's grief at losing her parents at a young age. Binoche made cameo appearances in the other two films in Kieślowski's trilogy, Three Colours: White and Three Colours: Red. Around this time, Steven Spielberg offered her roles in Jurassic Park and Schindler's List. She turned down both parts. After the success of Three Colors: Blue, Binoche took a short sabbatical during which she gave birth to her son Raphaël in September 1993.

In 1995, Binoche returned to the screen in a big-budget adaptation of Jean Giono's The Horseman on the Roof directed by Jean-Paul Rappeneau. The film was particularly significant in France as it was at the time the most expensive film in the history of French cinema. The film was a box office success around the world and Binoche was again nominated for a César for Best Actress. This role, as a romantic heroine, was to influence the direction of many of her subsequent roles in the late 1990s. In 1996, Binoche appeared in her first comedic role since My Brother-in-Law Killed My Sister a decade before; A Couch in New York was directed by Chantal Akerman and co-starred William Hurt. This screw-ball comedy tells the story of a New York psychiatrist who swaps homes with a Parisian dancer. The film was a critical and commercial failure. Three Colors: Blue, The Horseman on the Roof and A Couch in New York all gave Binoche the opportunity to work with prestigious directors she had turned down during the prolonged shoot of Les Amants du Pont-Neuf.

Her next role in The English Patient reinforced her position as an international movie star. The film, based on the novel by Michael Ondaatje and directed by Anthony Minghella, was a worldwide hit. Produced by Saul Zaentz, producer of The Unbearable Lightness of Being, the film reunited Juliette Binoche with Ralph Fiennes, Heathcliff to her Cathy four years previously. Binoche has said that the shoot on location in Tuscany and at the famed Cinecittà in Rome was among the happiest professional experiences of her career. The film, which tells the story of a badly burned, mysterious man found in the wreckage of a plane during World War II, won nine Academy Awards, including Best Supporting Actress for Juliette Binoche. With this film, she became the second French actress to win an Oscar, following Simone Signoret's win for Room at the Top in 1960. After this international hit, Binoche returned to France and began work opposite Daniel Auteuil on Claude Berri's Lucie Aubrac, the true story of a French Resistance heroine. Binoche was released from the film six weeks into the shoot due to differences with Berri regarding the authenticity of his script. Binoche has described this event as being like "an earthquake" to her.

In 2025, during an interview with the Independent she refers to this period as dreamlike, saying: "I definitely enjoyed the attention [The English Patient] was getting, and myself as well," she says. "And I felt like I needed to give something back to Anthony [Minghella]." Going on to add that: "I was trembling all the time. I was so insecure. I was aware of the chance I'd received by getting to play that part, and I would find myself just crumbling. But he helped me become more comfortable, more creative. He [Minghella] took such care of me, so when the Oscars happened, I played the game for him."

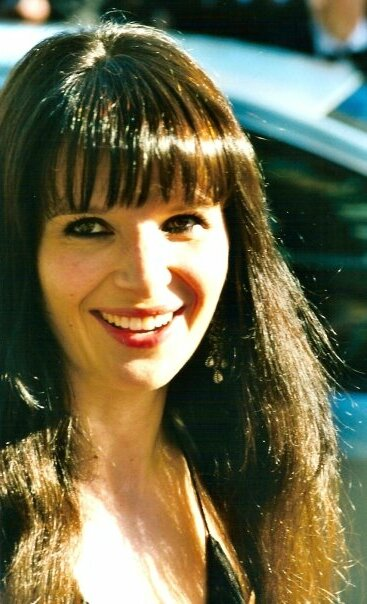
Binoche at the 2002 Cannes Film Festival

Next, Binoche was reunited with director André Téchiné for Alice et Martin (1998), the story of a relationship between an emotionally damaged Parisian musician and her younger lover who hides a dark family secret. The film failed to find an audience in France, although it was critically acclaimed in the UK. In February 1998, Binoche made her London stage debut in a new version of Luigi Pirandello's Clothe the Naked re-titled Naked and adapted by Nicolas Wright. The production, directed by Jonathan Kent, was very favorably received. Following this acclaimed performance, she returned to French screens with Children of the Century (1999), a big budget romantic epic, in which she played 19th-century French proto-feminist author George Sand. The film depicted Sand's affair with the poet and dandy Alfred de Musset played by Benoît Magimel. The following year saw Binoche in four contrasting roles, each of which enhanced her reputation. La Veuve de Saint-Pierre (2000) by Patrice Leconte, for which she was nominated for a César for Best Actress, was a period drama which saw Binoche appear opposite Daniel Auteuil in the role of a woman who attempts to save a condemned man from the guillotine. The film won favorable reviews, particularly in the U.S. where it was nominated for a Golden Globe for Best Foreign Language Film.

Next, she appeared in Michael Haneke's Code Unknown, a film which was made following Binoche's approach to the Austrian director. The film premiered in competition at the 2000 Cannes Film Festival. This critically acclaimed role was a welcome change from playing the romantic heroine in a series of costume dramas. Later that year, Binoche made her Broadway debut in an adaptation of Harold Pinter's Betrayal for which she was nominated for a Tony Award. Staged by the Roundabout Theatre Company and directed by David Leveaux, the production also featured Liev Schreiber and John Slattery. Back on screen, Binoche was the heroine of the Lasse Hallström film Chocolat from the best selling novel by Joanne Harris. For her role Binoche won a European Film Audience Award for Best Actress and was nominated for an Academy Award and a BAFTA. Chocolat is the story of a mysterious stranger who opens a chocolaterie in a conservative French village in 1959. The film was a worldwide hit.

Between 1995 and 2000, Binoche was the advertising face of the Lancôme perfume Poème, her image adorning print campaigns photographed by Richard Avedon and a television advertising campaign, including an advert directed by Anthony Minghella and scored by Gabriel Yared. By the end of this period and following roles in a number of prestige productions, critics were wondering if Binoche was typecast as the tragic, despairing muse. In a feature article titled "The Erotic Face" in the June 2000 edition of British film criticism magazine Sight and Sound, Ginette Vincendeau pondered Binoche's persona; Vincendeau suggested that the fixation of numerous directors upon her face had led to an erasure of her body, and to her being perceived only as a romantic icon rather than a versatile actress.

=== 2001–2006 ===
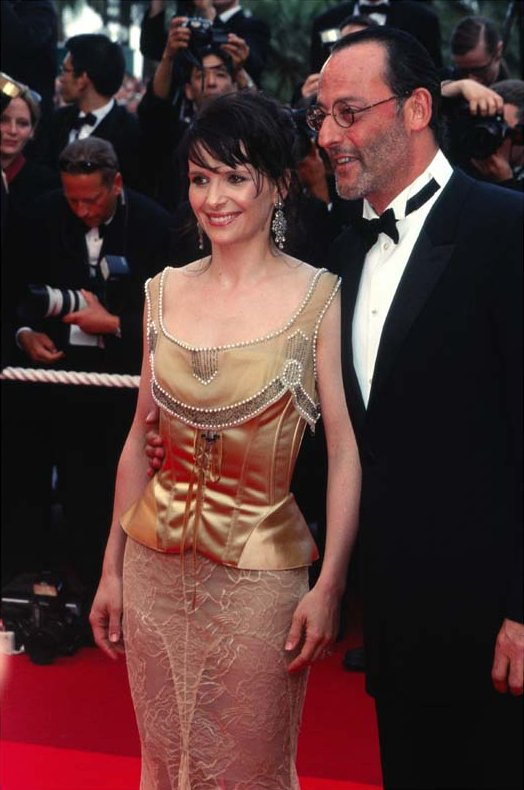
Juliette Binoche and Jean Reno at Cannes, 2002

After the success of Chocolat, Binoche was internationally recognized as an A-list movie star in the early 2000s, but as an actor her persona became somewhat fixed following a series of period roles portraying a stoic heroine facing tragedy and desolation. Keen to try something new, Binoche returned to French cinema in 2002 in an unlikely role: she played a ditsy beautician in Jet Lag opposite Jean Reno. The film, directed by Daniele Thompson, was a box office hit in France and Binoche was once again nominated for a César for Best Actress. The film tells the story of a couple who meet at an airport during a strike. Initially the pair despises each other, but, over the course of one night, they find common ground and maybe even love. This playful spirit continued when Binoche featured in a 2003 Italian television commercial for the chocolates Ferrero Rocher. The advertisement played upon her Chocolat persona featuring Binoche handing out the chocolates to people on the streets of Paris.

In a more serious vein, Binoche traveled to South Africa to make John Boorman's In My Country (2004) opposite Samuel L. Jackson. Based on the book Country of My Skull by Antjie Krog, the film examines The Truth and Reconciliation Commission (TRC) hearings following the abolition of Apartheid in the mid-1990s. Although the film premiered at the 2004 Berlin International Film Festival, it received much criticism for the inclusion of a fictional romantic liaison and for its depiction of black South Africans. Despite the negative reception, Binoche was extremely enthusiastic about the film and her connection with Boorman. Her sister, Marion Stalens, also traveled to South Africa to shoot a documentary, La réconciliation?, which explores the TRC process and follows Binoche's progress as she acts in Boorman's film. Next, Binoche re-teamed with Michael Haneke for Caché. The film was an immediate success, winning best director for Haneke at the 2005 Cannes Film Festival, while Binoche was nominated for a European Film Award for Best Actress for her role. The film tells the story of a bourgeois Parisian couple, played by Binoche and Daniel Auteuil, who begin to receive anonymous videotapes containing footage shot over long periods, surveying the outside of their home. Caché went on to feature in the number one position on the "Top 10 of the 2000s" list published by The Times at the end of the decade.

Binoche's next film, Bee Season, based on the celebrated novel by Myla Goldberg, cast her opposite Richard Gere. The film was not a success at the box office taking less than $5 million worldwide. For many critics the film, although intelligent, was "distant and diffuse". Bee Season depicts the emotional disintegration of a family just as their daughter begins to win national spelling bees. Mary (2005) featured Binoche in a somewhat unlikely collaboration with the controversial American director Abel Ferrara for an investigation of modern faith and Mary Magdalene's position within the Catholic Church. Featuring Forest Whitaker, Matthew Modine and Marion Cotillard, Mary was a success, winning the Grand Prix at the 2005 Venice Film Festival. Despite these accolades and favorable reviews, particularly from the cultural magazine Les Inrockuptibles, Mary failed to secure a distributor in key markets such as the US and the UK.

The Cannes Film Festival in 2006 saw Binoche feature in the anthology film Paris, je t'aime appearing in a section directed by the Japanese director Nobuhiro Suwa. Suwa's Place des Victoires is the story of a grief-stricken mother who manages to have a final brief moment with her dead son. The segment also features Willem Dafoe and Hippolyte Girardot. Paris, je t'aime was a popular success, taking over $17 million, at the world box-office. In September 2006, Binoche appeared at the Venice Film Festival to launch A Few Days in September, written and directed by Santiago Amigorena. Despite an impressive cast including John Turturro, Nick Nolte and up-and-coming French star Sara Forestier, the film was a failure. A Few Days in September is a thriller set between 5 and 11 September 2001, in which Binoche plays a French secret service agent, who may, or may not, have information relating to impending attacks on the U.S. The film was the recipient of harsh criticism from the press for its perceived trivialisation of the events of 11 September 2001. While promoting the film in the UK, Binoche told an interviewer she believed the CIA and other government agencies must have had foreknowledge of the 11 September attacks, as depicted in the film.

Next, Binoche traveled to the 2006 Toronto International Film Festival for the premiere of Breaking and Entering, her second film with Anthony Minghella in the director's chair, based on his first original screenplay since his breakthrough film Truly, Madly, Deeply (1991). In Breaking and Entering, Binoche played a Bosnian refugee living in London, while Jude Law co-starred as a well-to-do businessman drawn into her life via an act of deception. In preparation for her role, Binoche traveled to Sarajevo where she met women who had survived the war of the 1990s. Lushly photographed by Benoît Delhomme, Breaking and Entering portrays intersecting lives amongst the flux of urban renewal in inner-city London. Despite the fact that Binoche was praised for her performance, the film did not ring true for critics and failed to find an audience. In a review in Variety, Todd McCarthy writes that, "Binoche, physically unchanged as ever, plays Amira's controlled anguish with skill". Breaking and Entering also featured Robin Wright, Vera Farmiga, Juliet Stevenson, Rafi Gavron and Martin Freeman.

Although Binoche began the decade on a professional high with an Academy Award nomination for Chocolat, she struggled at the beginning of the 2000s to secure roles that did not confine her to the tragic, melancholic persona developed in the 1990s. Despite the huge success of Caché, other high-profile films such as In My Country, Bee Season and Breaking and Entering failed critically and commercially. Binoche again seemed to be at a crossroads in her career.

=== 2007–2012 ===
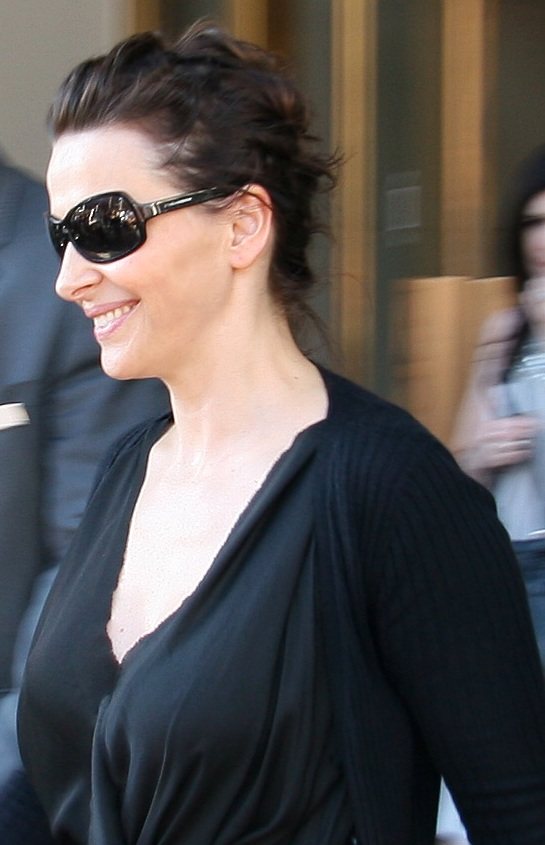
Binoche at the 2007 Toronto International Film Festival

2007 was the start of a particularly busy period for Binoche, one that would see her take on diverse roles in a series of critically acclaimed international movies giving her film career a new impetus, as she shed the restrictions that seemed to have stifled her career in the early part of the decade. The Cannes Film Festival saw the premiere of Flight of the Red Balloon (2007) by the Taiwanese director Hou Hsiao-hsien. It was originally conceived as a short film to form part of a 20th anniversary tribute to the Musée d'Orsay, to be produced by Serge Lemoine, president of the museum. When that idea failed to find sufficient funding, Hou developed it into a feature-length film and secured the necessary financing. The film was well received by international critics and went on to debut around the world early in 2008. Paying homage to Albert Lamorisse's 1957 short The Red Balloon, Hou's film tells the story of a woman's efforts to juggle her responsibilities as a single mother with her commitment to her career as a voice artist. Shot on location in Paris, the film was entirely improvised by the cast. The film was number one on the influential critic J. Hoberman's "Top 10 List" for 2008 published in The Village Voice.

She was also honored with the Maureen O'Hara Award at the Kerry Film Festival in 2010, an award offered to women who have excelled in their chosen field in film.

Disengagement by Amos Gitai premiered out-of-competition at the 2007 Venice Film Festival. Co-starring Liron Levo and Jeanne Moreau, Disengagement is a political drama charting the story of a French woman, of Dutch/Palestinian origin, who goes in search of a daughter she abandoned 20 years previously on the Gaza strip. She arrives in Gaza during the 2005 Israeli disengagement. The film won the prestigious Premio Roberto Rossellini and was critically acclaimed, particularly by the eminent Cahiers du cinéma. However the film proved more controversial in Israel where state television station Channel 1 withdrew financial support for the film citing the "left-wing nature of Gitai's films".

In stark contrast, Peter Hedges co-wrote and directed the Disney-produced Dan in Real Life, a romantic comedy featuring Binoche alongside Steve Carell. It was released in October 2007, becoming a popular commercial success in the US, before debuting around the world in 2008. The film grossed over $65 million at the worldwide box-office. Dan in Real Life is the story of a widowed man (Carell) who meets, and instantly falls for, a woman (Binoche), only to discover she is the new girlfriend of his brother. The film also features Dane Cook, Emily Blunt and Dianne Wiest.

Back in France, Binoche experienced popular and critical success in Paris directed by Cédric Klapisch. Paris is Klapisch's personal ode to the French capital and features an impressive ensemble of French talent, including Romain Duris, Fabrice Luchini and Mélanie Laurent. Paris was one of the most successful French films internationally in recent years, having grossed over $22 million at the world box office. Binoche and Klapisch had originally met on the set of Mauvais Sang in 1986, where Klapisch was working as a set electrician.

Also in France, Summer Hours (2008), directed by Olivier Assayas, is the critically acclaimed story of three siblings who struggle with the responsibility of disposing of their late mother's valuable art collection. The film premiered in France in March 2008 and had its U.S. debut at the 2008 New York Film Festival, before going on general release in the U.S. on 19 May 2009. Widely acclaimed, the film was nominated for the Prix Louis Delluc in France and appeared on numerous U.S. "Top 10 lists", including first place on David Edelstein's "Top 10 of 2009" list in New York magazine, and J. R. Jones's list in the Chicago Reader. Summer Hours also features Charles Berling, Jérémie Renier and Édith Scob.

In the autumn of 2008, Binoche starred in a theatrical dance production titled in-i, co-created with renowned choreographer Akram Khan. The show, a love story told through dance and dialogue, featured stage design by Anish Kapoor and music by Philip Sheppard. It premiered at the National Theatre in London before embarking on a world tour. The Sunday Times in the UK commented that, "Binoche's physical achievement is incredible: Khan is a master mover". The production was part of a 'Binoche Season' titled Ju'Bi'lations, also featuring a retrospective of her film work and an exhibition of her paintings, which were also published in a bilingual book Portraits in Eyes. The book featured ink portraits of Binoche as each of her characters and of each director she had worked with up to that time. She also penned a few lines to each director.

In April 2006 and again in December 2007, Binoche traveled to Tehran at the invitation of Abbas Kiarostami. While there in 2007, she shot a cameo appearance in his film Shirin (2008) which he was shooting at the time. Binoche's visit proved controversial when two Iranian MPs raised the matter in parliament, advising more caution be exercised in granting visas to foreign celebrities which might lead to "cultural destruction". In June 2009, Binoche began work on Certified Copy directed by Kiarostami. The film was an Official Selection in competition at the 2010 Cannes Film Festival. Binoche won the Best Actress Award at the festival for her performance. The film went on general release in France on 19 May 2010 to very positive reviews. Her win at the 2010 Cannes Film festival makes Binoche the first actress to win the European "best actress triple crown": Best Actress at Venice for Three Colors: Blue, Best Actress at Berlin for The English Patient and Best Actress at Cannes for Certified Copy. The September 2010 UK release of the film was overshadowed when French actor Gérard Depardieu made disparaging comments about Binoche to the Austrian magazine Profil, "Please can you explain to me what the mystery of Juliette Binoche is meant to be?" he said. "I would really like to know why she has been so esteemed for so many years. She has nothing – absolutely nothing". In response, while promoting Certified Copy, Binoche spoke to movie magazine Empire saying, "I don't know him. I understand you don't have to like everyone and you can dislike someone's work. But I don't understand the violence [of his statements]... I do not understand why he is behaving like this. It is his problem." Certified Copy proved to be controversial in Kiarostami's homeland when Iranian authorities announced on 27 May 2010 that the film was to be banned in Iran, apparently due to Binoche's attire; Deputy Culture Minister Javad Shamaqdari is quoted as saying, "If Juliette Binoche were better clad it could have been screened but due to her attire there will not be a general screening."

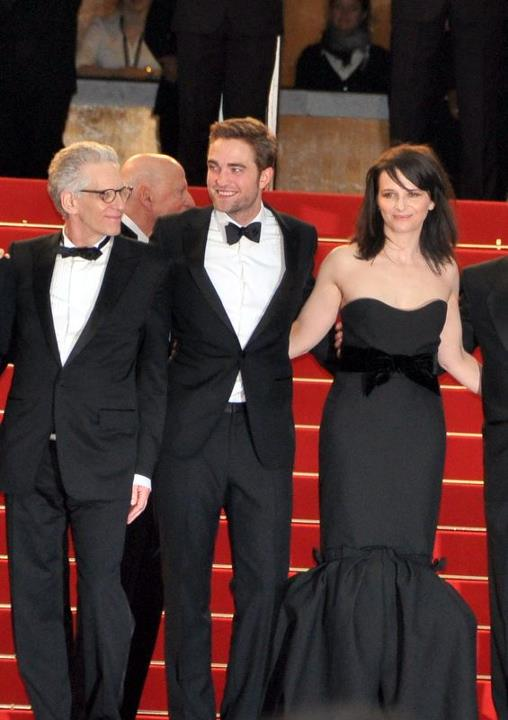
David Cronenberg, Robert Pattinson and Juliette Binoche at the premiere of Cosmopolis at the 2012 Cannes Film Festival

Following the success of Certified Copy, Binoche appeared in a brief supporting role in The Son of No One for American writer and director Dito Montiel. The film also stars Channing Tatum, Al Pacino and Ray Liotta. The Son of No One premiered at the 2011 Sundance Film Festival to fairly negative reaction. It was acquired by Anchor Bay Entertainment for distribution in the US and other key territories arriving in selected US cinemas on 4 November 2011. As of December 2011, according to film review aggregator Rotten Tomatoes, The Son of No One is Juliette Binoche's least critically successful film, with only 18% of critics giving it a positive review.

In June 2010, Binoche started work on Elles for Polish director Małgorzata Szumowska. Elles, produced under the working title Sponsoring, is an examination of teenage prostitution with Juliette Binoche playing a journalist for ELLE. The film was released in France on 1 February 2012. On 12 January 2011, Variety announced that Juliette Binoche would star in Another Woman's Life loosely based on the novel La Vie d'une Autre by Frédérique Deghelt. Released in France on 15 February 2012, the film is the directorial debut of the French actress Sylvie Testud and co-stars actor/director Mathieu Kassovitz. Another Woman's Life is the story of Marie (Binoche) a young woman who meets and spends the night with Paul (Kassovitz). When she wakes up, she discovers that 15 years have passed. With no memory of these years she learns she has acquired an impressive career, a son and a marriage to Paul which seems headed for divorce. The film met with generally mixed reviews in France.

On 17 February 2011, Screendaily announced that Binoche had been cast in David Cronenberg's film Cosmopolis with Robert Pattinson, Paul Giamatti, Mathieu Amalric, and Samantha Morton. Binoche appeared in a supporting role as a New York art dealer, Didi Fancher, who is having an affair with Pattinson's Eric Packer. The film, produced by Paulo Branco, began principal photography on 24 May 2011 and was released in 2012, following a competition slot at the 2012 Cannes Film Festival. Cosmopolis received mixed reviews from critics. August 2012 saw the French release of An Open Heart opposite Édgar Ramírez and directed by Marion Laine. Based on the novel Remonter l'Orénoque by Mathias Énard, the film is the story of the obsessive relationship between two highly successful surgeons. The film depicts the consequences of an unexpected pregnancy and alcoholism upon their relationship. The second film directed by Laine, An Open Heart met with tepid reviews in France and poor box office receipts.

=== 2013–present ===
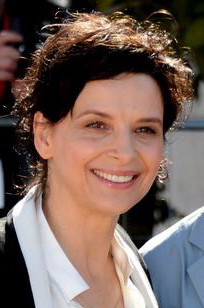
Binoche promoting Clouds of Sils Maria at the 2014 Cannes Film Festival

Released at the 2013 Berlin International Film Festival, Bruno Dumont's Camille Claudel 1915 is a drama recounting three days of the 30 years French artist Camille Claudel (Binoche) spent in a mental asylum though she had not been diagnosed with any malady. The film examines Claudel's fight to maintain her sanity and find creative inspiration while awaiting a visit from her brother, the poet Paul Claudel. The film received excellent reviews with Binoche in particular gaining praise for her performance.

Following this, Binoche completed work on A Thousand Times Good Night for director Erik Poppe in which she plays a war photographer and the romantic drama Words and Pictures with Clive Owen from veteran director Fred Schepisi. She co-starred in Gareth Edwards's Godzilla, which was theatrically released in May 2014. August 2013 saw Binoche reunite with Olivier Assayas for Clouds of Sils Maria. The film was written especially for Binoche and plot elements parallel her life. It also featured Kristen Stewart and Chloë Grace Moretz. The film had its debut at Cannes 2014. Following this role Binoche was slated to appear in Nobody Wants the Night by Isabel Coixet which was due to begin shooting late in 2013.

In 2015, Binoche starred on stage in a new English language translation of Antigone. Directed by Ivo van Hove, the production had a world premier in Luxembourg at the end of February. Then, it embarked an international tour to London, Antwerp, Amsterdam, Edinburgh, Paris, Recklinghausen and New York.

Binoche narrated the new documentary film titled Talking about Rose about the Chad soldier Rose Lokissim who fought against Hissène Habré's dictatorship in the 1980s.

In 2016, Binoche reunited with Bruno Dumont for the comedy film Slack Bay. The 2016 Cannes Film Festival saw the première of Slack Bay (Ma Loute), also starring Fabrice Luchini and Valeria Bruni Tedeschi, which is a burlesque comedy based in the Ambleteuse region of Northern France. Set in 1910, the film tells the unusual story of two families linked by an unlikely romance. Ma Loute won much praise from French critics and was a popular success at the French box office.

Following the success of her reunion with Bruno Dumont, Juliette Binoche next made a special appearance in Polina, danser sa vie (2016) directed by Valérie Müller and Angelin Preljocaj, focusing on the story of a gifted Russian ballerina, Polina (Anastasia Shevtsoda). From Moscow to Aix-En-Provence and Antwerp, from success to disillusion, we follow Polina's incredible destiny. Binoche portrays a choreographer, Liria Elsaj, who awakens a desire in Polina to move away from classical ballet to explore more contemporary dance. In October 2017, she performed Barbara's autobiographical prose in the Philharmonie de Paris, accompanied by the French pianist Alexandre Tharaud.

Telle mère, telle fille (Like Mother, Like Daughter) (2017) is a comedy from Noémie Saglio and features Binoche as a free-wheeling 47-year-old who falls pregnant at the same time as her uptight daughter Avril (Camille Cottin). The film also features Lambert Wilson, reuniting with Binoche 32 years after they were a sensation at the 1985 Cannes Film Festival in André Téchiné's Rendez-Vous. In May 2017 Binoche and Cottin appeared together again, this time on the small screen in the final episode of the second season of Dix Pour Cent (Call My Agent) where Juliette Binoche played herself in a tongue-in-cheek episode centering on the Cannes Film Festival.

Returning to the big screen, Binoche next appeared in a supporting role in Rupert Sanders's big screen adaptation of the cult manga Ghost in the Shell (2017). Binoche played Dr Ouelet, a scientist with the Hanka organization responsible for creating the ghost in the shell, Major, portrayed by Scarlett Johansson. Binoche, Sanders and Johansson did extensive promotion for the film in the US, Japan, Europe and Australia.

May 2017 saw the première of Claire Denis's Un Beau Soleil Intérieur (Let the Sunshine In) (2017) at the Quinzaine des Réalisateurs selection at the Cannes Film Festival. The film is the story of a middle-aged Parisian artist, Isabelle (Binoche), who is searching for true love at last. The film depicts her many encounters with a number of unsuitable men. The film also features Xavier Beauvois, Nicolas Duvauchelle, Josiane Balasko, Valeria-Bruni Tedeschi and Gérard Depardieu. Un Beau Soleil Intérieur was a success with audiences and critics around the world.

Next, Binoche appeared in Naomi Kawase's Vision (2018). Following that, she reunited with Claire Denis for the English language High Life (2018), Olivier Assayas for Doubles Vies (2019) and Patrice Leconte for La maison vide (2019).

In 2024, the Board of the European Film Academy unanimously elected her President of the Academy, replacing Agnieszka Holland, the Polish director, who decided to devote her time to filmmaking.

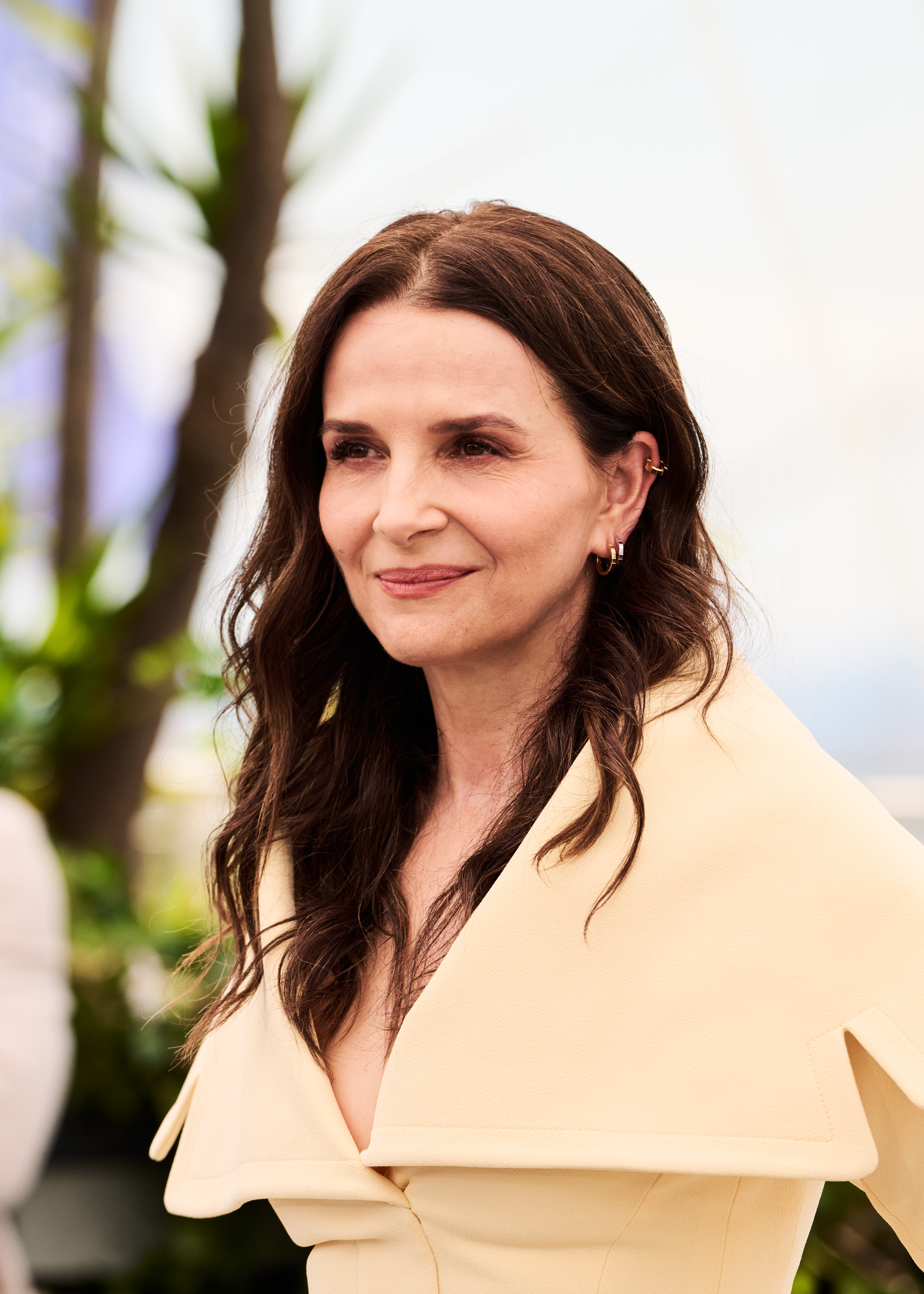
Binoche at the 2025 Cannes Film Festival

On 4 February 2025, Binoche was named as jury president for that year's Cannes Film Festival.

== Personal life ==
Binoche has two children: son Raphaël (born on 2 September 1993), whose father is André Halle, a professional scuba diver, and daughter Hana (born on 16 December 1999), whose father is actor Benoît Magimel, with whom Binoche starred in the 1999 film Children of the Century and the 2023 film The Taste of Things.

Her sister, Marion Stalens, born 1960, is a professional photographer with Corbis, as well as a director of documentary films, including: La réconciliation?, a documentary shot on the set of John Boorman's film In My Country; The Actress and the Dancer, which explores the genesis of Binoche's dance show In-I; and Juliette Binoche – Sketches for a Portrait, a documentary which follows Binoche as she paints the portraits that would later appear in her book Portraits in Eyes. Marion is married to stage director Pierre Pradinas.

Her half-brother Camille Humeau (born 1978) is a musician and has been part of the line-up of Oncle Strongle, before top-lining the group Artichaut Orkestra. In 2007, he appeared in a stage production of Cabaret directed by Sam Mendes.

=== Charitable work ===
Since 1992, Binoche has been a patron of the French Cambodian charity Enfants d'Asie (previously ASPECA). Through this charity, she is godmother to five Cambodian orphans, and has funded the construction of a children's home in Battambang. Starting in 2000, she has been involved with the organization Reporters Without Borders. In 2002, she presided over "Photos of Stars" with Thierry Ardisson. Nearly 100 French stars were given disposable cameras, which were then auctioned, the buyer then having the exclusive photos taken by the star developed.

=== Political views and activism ===
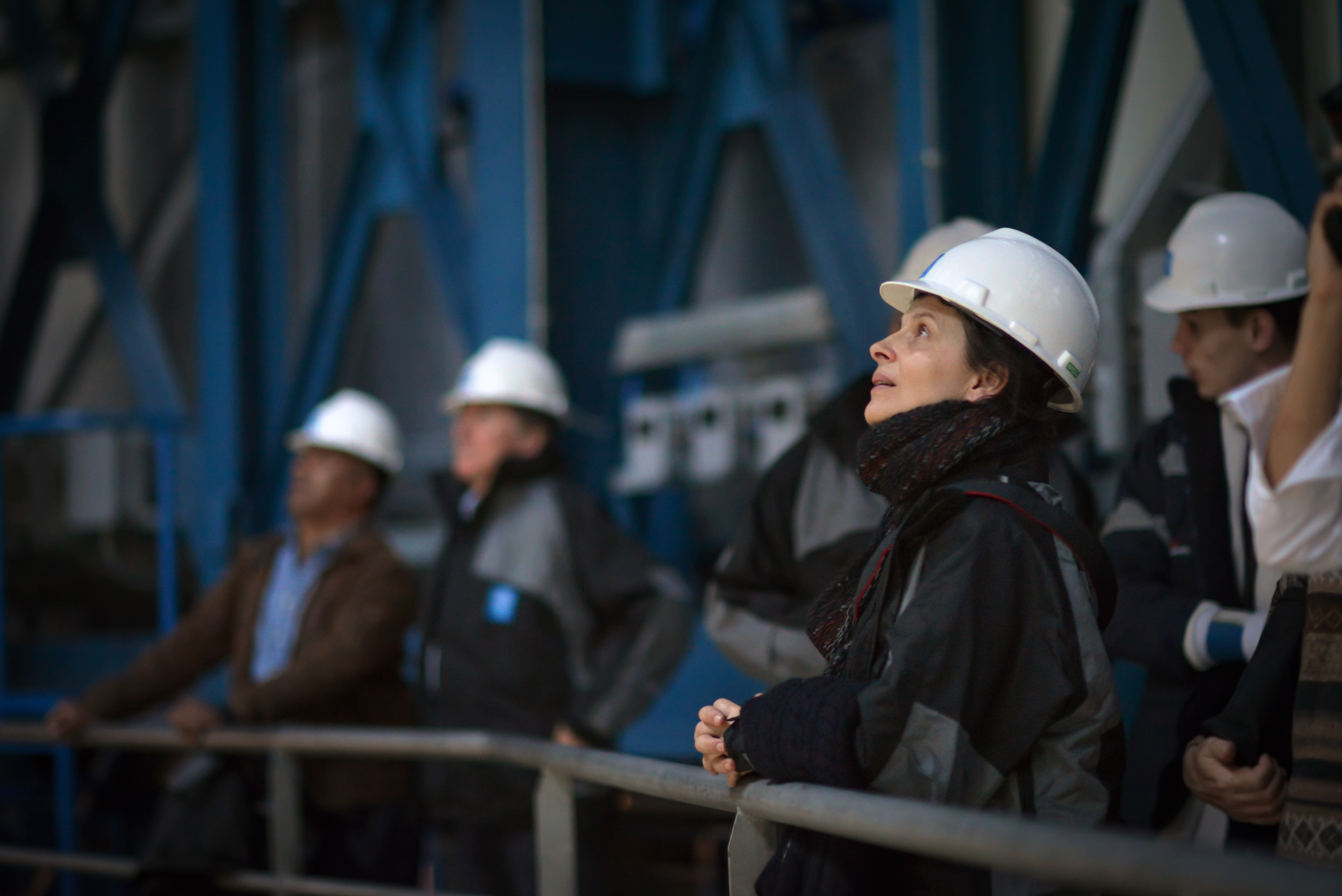
Binoche in one of the Very Large Telescope enclosures

On 7 February 2006, Binoche attended a high-profile demonstration organized by Reporters Without Borders in support of Jill Carroll and two Iraqi journalists who had been abducted in Baghdad.

She supported José Bové in the 2007 French presidential election, which was won by Nicolas Sarkozy. She disclosed on a number of occasions that she did not approve of the Sarkozy administration, stating that he was creating a monarchic republic.

In 2009, she commented on the September 11 attacks during the shooting of Quelques jours en septembre, a spy film in which interest groups, including the American secret services, were aware of an imminent attack on the United States. She talked with a secret agent, who was a consultant for the film, and was reported in an English newspaper saying: "He couldn't tell me everything, but he told me a lot. I was surprised by some things."

Binoche and numerous other French personalities, including Isabelle Adjani, Yvan Attal, Jane Birkin, and Josiane Balasko, joined Réseau Éducation Sans Frontières (RESF) on 7 January 2010 with a symbolic "cake of solidarity" to highlight the taxation and legitimacy issues being faced by undocumented workers in France.

Binoche was a signatory to a June 2010 petition organized by Reporters Without Borders and Shirin Ebadi to protest against the detention of numerous people, including members of the press, who were protesting the occasion of the first anniversary of the disputed re-election of Iran's president Mahmoud Ahmadinejad.

At the 2010 Cannes Film Festival, Binoche spoke out against the detention of Iranian director Jafar Panahi, incarcerated in Tehran's Evin Prison since 1 March 2010 without charge or conviction. At the press conference following the press screening of Copie Conforme, Binoche was informed that Panahi had begun a hunger strike. The following day, Binoche attended a press conference called especially to demand the release of Panahi. Also in attendance were Abbas Kiarostami, Mohsen Makhmalbaf, and Gilles Jacob. Binoche read a letter that said that Panahi's detention was "unwarranted and intolerable". When Binoche was awarded the Best Actress award at the festival, brandishing his name on a placard, she used her speech as an opportunity to raise Panahi's plight once again. On 25 May, it was announced that Panahi had been released on bail. It was generally agreed that the publicity Binoche and Kiarostami elicited for his case was a strong factor in his release. On 20 December 2010, Panahi, after being prosecuted for "assembly and colluding with the intention to commit crimes against the country's national security and propaganda against the Islamic Republic", was handed a six-year jail sentence and a 20-year ban on making or directing any movies, writing screenplays, giving any form of interview with Iranian or foreign media, as well as leaving the country. Binoche continued to lobby on his behalf.

In May 2018, she co-authored a tribune in the newspaper Le Monde, in which she opposed the lawsuit brought by the French judiciary to three people who had helped migrants, and said she had already helped migrants in need and intended to continue to do so.

In 2018 she signed a letter calling to act "firmly and immediately" for stopping climate change and biodiversity loss.

In February 2019, during a press conference at the Berlin International Film Festival, Binoche said that Harvey Weinstein was a great producer and "we shouldn't forget, even though it has been difficult for some directors and actors, and especially actresses". Binoche also said: "I almost want to say peace to his mind and heart, that's all, I'm trying to put my feet in his shoes. He's had enough, I think. A lot of people have expressed themselves. Now justice has to do its work."

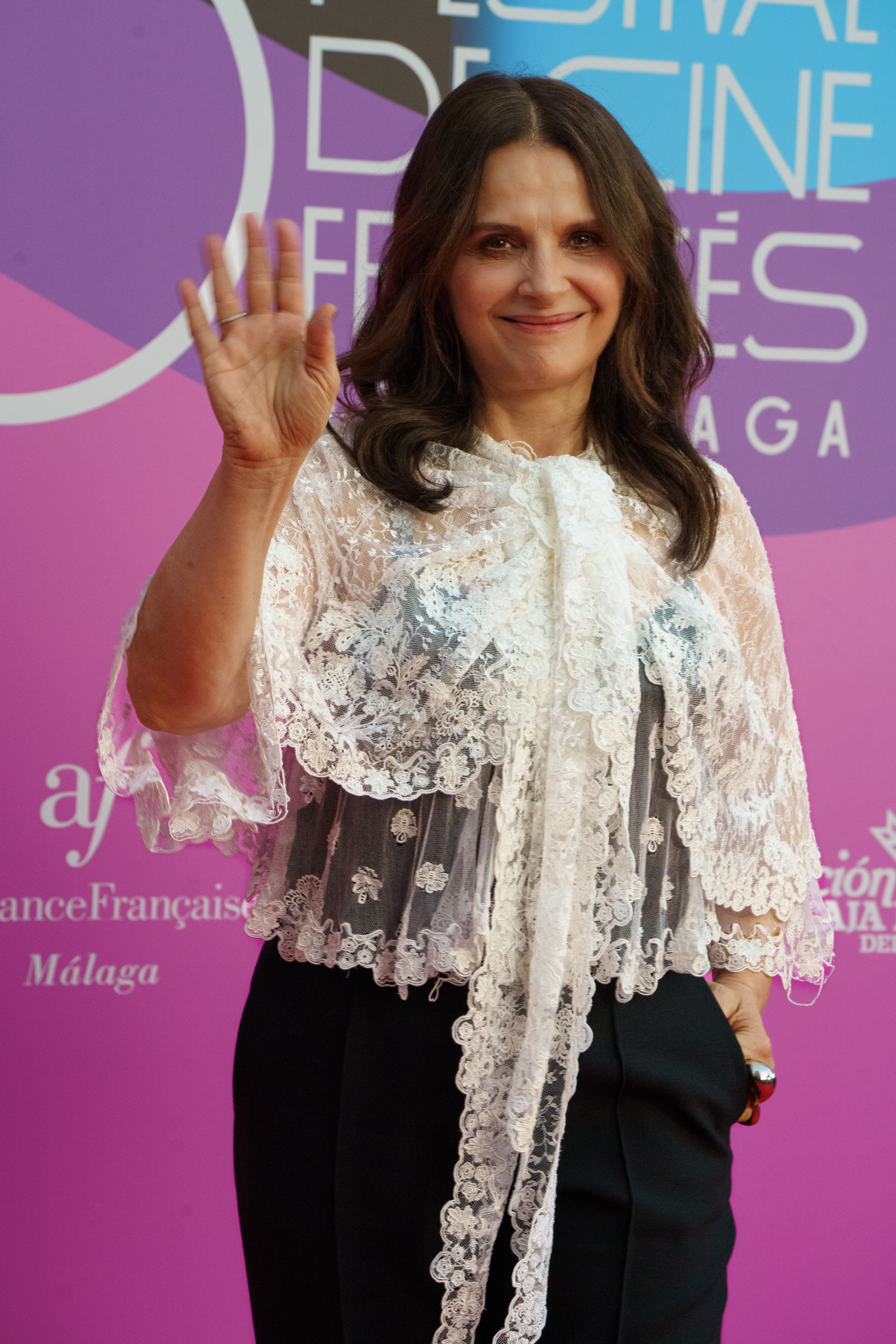
Binoche attending the Málaga French Film Festival in October 2024

Binoche was among a group of artists and celebrities who signed a letter condemning the film industry's silence regarding the war in Gaza. At the opening ceremony of the 78th Cannes Film Festival in May 2025, Binoche paid tribute to Fatima Hassouna, a 25-year-old Palestinian photojournalist and subject of the documentary Put Your Soul on Your Hand and Walk, who was killed in an Israeli airstrike in Gaza.

In January 2026, Binoche joined Hollywood film professionals that condemned the Iranian regime's violence against the Iranian people, who were protesting against the government and the economic crisis.

In June 2026, She is one of people who demand changes for justice system after 11 year old girl was murdered by repent offender.

=== Religion ===
Binoche is a Christian and reads the Bible daily, stating in a 2025 interview with The Independent: "I believe there is a God up there, but it cannot just be belief. It needs to be concrete for me – real, embodied. Otherwise it is just ideas."

== Acting credits ==
=== Film ===
Year	Title	Role	Director	Notes
1983	Liberty belle	Girl at the rally	Pascal Kané	
1985	Le Meilleur de la vie	Veronique's friend	Renaud Victor	
1985	Farewell Blaireau	Brigitte	Bob Decout	
1985	Rendez-vous	Nina/Anne Larrieux	André Téchiné	Nominations: Cesar Awards for Best Actress
1985	Family Life	Natacha	Jacques Doillon	
1985	Les Nanas	Antoinette	Annick Lanoë	
1985	Hail Mary	Juliette	Jean-Luc Godard	
1986	Mauvais Sang	Anna	Leos Carax	Nominations: Cesar Awards for Best Actress
1986	My Brother-in-Law Killed My Sister	Esther Bouloire	Jacques Rouffio	
1988	The Unbearable Lightness of Being	Tereza	Philip Kaufman	
1989	Un tour de manège	Elsa	Pierre Pradinas	
1991	Les Amants du Pont-Neuf	Michèle Stalens	Leos Carax	Nominations: Cesar Awards for Best Actress
1992	Damage	Anna Barton	Louis Malle	Nominations: Cesar Awards for Best Actress
1992	Emily Brontë's Wuthering Heights	Cathy Linton / Catherine Earnshaw	Peter Kosminsky	
1993	Three Colors: Blue	Julie Vignon de Courcy	Krzysztof Kieślowski	Wins: Volpi Cup for Best Actress; César Awards for Best Actress Nominations: Golden Globe for Best Actress in a Motion Picture - Drama
1994	Three Colors: White	Julie Vignon de Courcy	Krzysztof Kieślowski	
1994	Three Colors: Red	Julie Vignon de Courcy	Krzysztof Kieślowski	
1995	The Horseman on the Roof	Pauline de Théus	Jean-Paul Rappeneau	Nominations: Cesar Awards for Best Actress
1996	The English Patient	Hana	Anthony Minghella	Wins: Silver Bear for Best Actresses; Academy Award for Best Supporting Actress; BAFTA for Best Supporting Actress Nominations: Golden Globe for Best Supporting Actress; SAG for Outstanding Female Actor in a Supporting Role & Outstanding Cast in a Motion Picture
1996	A Couch in New York	Béatrice Saulnier	Chantal Akerman	
1998	Alice and Martin	Alice	André Téchiné	
1999	Children of the Century	George Sand	Diane Kurys	
2000	Chocolat	Vianne Rocher	Lasse Hallström	Nominations: Academy Award for Best Actress; BAFTA for Best Actress; Golden Globe for Best Actress in a Motion Picture - Drama; SAG for Outstanding Female Actor in a Leading Role & Outstanding Cast in a Motion picture
2000	Code Unknown	Anne Laurent	Michael Haneke	
2000	The Widow of Saint-Pierre	Madame "La", Pauline	Patrice Leconte	Nominations: Cesar Awards for Best Actress
2002	Jet Lag	Rose	Danièle Thompson	Nominations: Cesar Awards for Best Actress
2004	In My Country	Anna Malan	John Boorman	
2005	Mary	Marie Palesi/Mary Magdalene	Abel Ferrara	
2005	Bee Season	Miriam	Scott McGehee	
2005	Caché	Anne Laurent	Michael Haneke	
2006	Breaking and Entering	Amira	Anthony Minghella	
2006	A Few Days in September	Irène Montano	Santiago Amigorena	
2006	Paris, je t'aime	Suzanne	Nobuhiro Suwa	Segment: "Place des Victoires"
2007	Dan in Real Life	Marie	Peter Hedges	
2007	Disengagement	Ana	Amos Gitai	
2007	Flight of the Red Balloon	Suzanne	Hou Hsiao-hsien	
2008	Paris	Elise	Cédric Klapisch	
2008	Summer Hours	Adrienne	Olivier Assayas	
2008	Shirin	Woman in audience	Abbas Kiarostami	
2010	Certified Copy	Elle	Abbas Kiarostami	Wins: Best Actress Award at Canne Film Festival (Prix d'interprétation féminine)
2011	The Son of No One	Loren Bridges	Dito Montiel	
2011	Elles	Anne	Małgorzata Szumowska	
2012	Cosmopolis	Didi Fancher	David Cronenberg	
2012	Another Woman's Life	Marie Speranski	Sylvie Testud	
2012	An Open Heart	Mila	Marion Laine	
2013	Camille Claudel 1915	Camille Claudel	Bruno Dumont	
2013	A Thousand Times Good Night	Rebecca	Erik Poppe	
2014	Words and Pictures	Dina Delsanto	Fred Schepisi	
2014	Godzilla	Sandra Brody	Gareth Edwards	
2014	Clouds of Sils Maria	Maria Enders	Olivier Assayas	Nominations: Cesar Awards for Best Actress
2015	The 33	María Segovia	Patricia Riggen	
2015	7 Letters	Elle	Eric Khoo	Segment "Cinema"; cameo
2015	Endless Night	Josephine Peary	Isabel Coixet	
2015	The Wait	Anna	Piero Messina	
2016	Slack Bay	Aude Van Peteghem	Bruno Dumont	
2016	Polina	Liria Elsaj	Valérie Müller; Angelin Preljocaj	
2017	Ghost in the Shell	Dr. Ouelet	Rupert Sanders	
2017	Baby Bumps	Mado	Noémie Saglio	
2017	Let the Sunshine In	Isabelle	Claire Denis	Nominations: Cesar Awards for Best Actress
2018	High Life	Dr. Dibs	Claire Denis	
2018	Vision	Jeanne	Naomi Kawase	
2018	Non-Fiction	Selena	Olivier Assayas	
2019	Who You Think I Am	Claire Millaud	Safy Nebbou	
2019	The Truth	Lumir	Hirokazu Kore-eda	
2020	How to Be a Good Wife	Paulette Van der Beck	Martin Provost	
2021	Between Two Worlds	Marianne Winckler	Emmanuel Carrère	Nominations: Cesar Awards for Best Actress
2022	Both Sides of the Blade	Sara	Claire Denis	
2022	Paradise Highway	Sally	Anna Gutto	
2022	Winter Boy	Isabelle	Christophe Honoré	
2023	The Taste of Things	Eugénie	Tran Anh Hung	
2024	The Return	Penelope	Uberto Pasolini	
2026	Queen at Sea	Amanda	Lance Hammer	February 2026

=== Television ===
Year	Title	Role	Notes
1983	Dorothée, danseuse de corde	Minor role	TV movie
1985	Fort bloqué	Nicole	TV movie
1991	Women & Men 2	Mara	TV movie
2011	Mademoiselle Julie	Mademoiselle Julie	TV movie
2017	Call My Agent!	Herself (guest)	Episode: "Juliette"
2022	The Staircase	Sophie Brunet	Miniseries
2024	The New Look	Coco Chanel	Main role

=== Theatre ===
Year	Title	Role	Playwright	Venue
1998	Naked	Ersilia Dei	Luigi Pirandello	Almeida Theatre, London
2000–2001	Betrayal	Emma	Harold Pinter	American Airlines Theatre, Broadway

=== Documentaries ===
Year	Title	Role
2009	Juliette Binoche dans les yeux	Her-self
2016	Les années Obama	narrator
