= List of awards and nominations received by Juliette Binoche =

Juliette Binoche awards and nominations
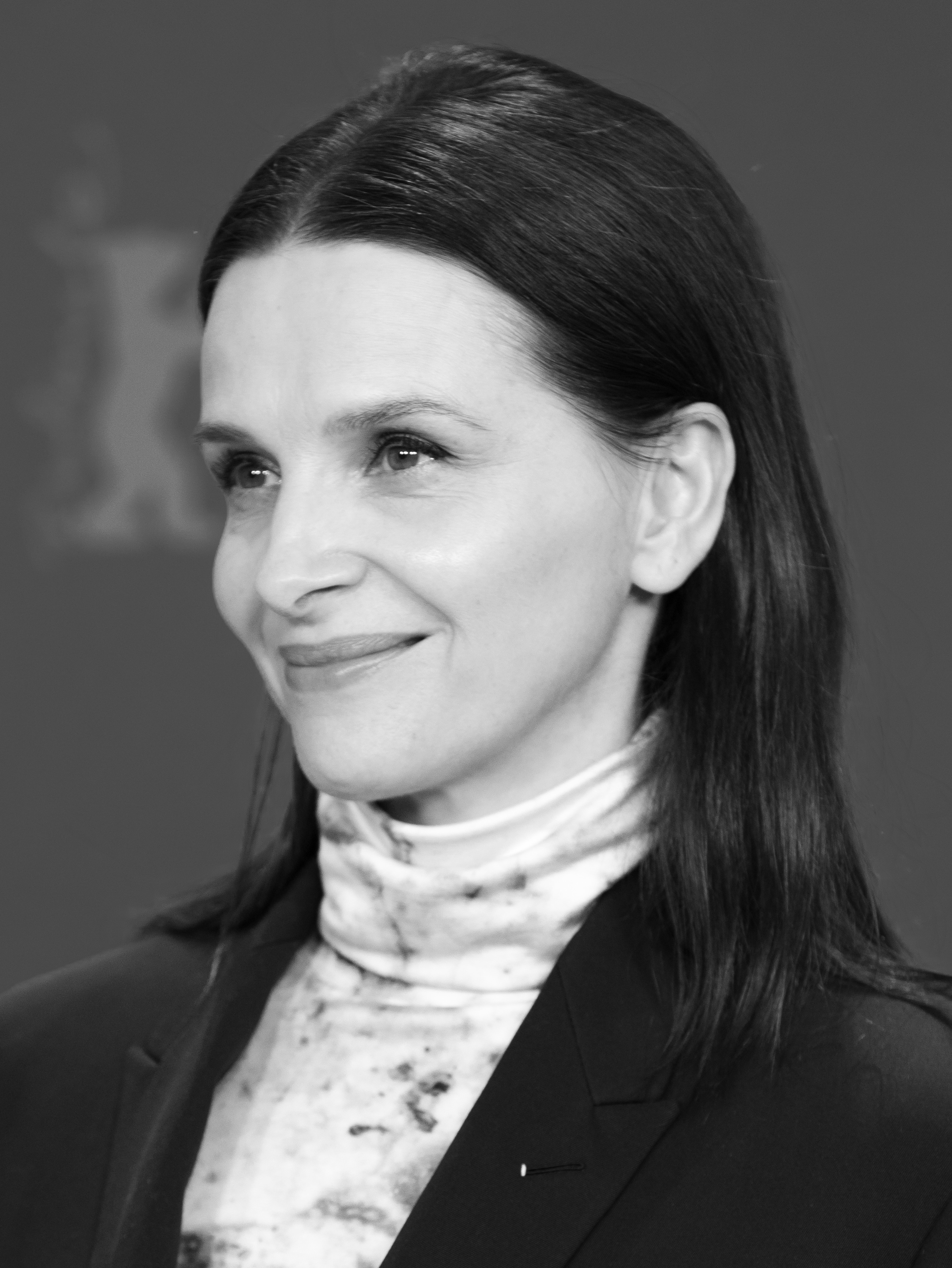
- Binoche at the 69th Berlin International Film Festival in 2019.
Award	Wins	Nominations
Totals
Academy Awards	1	2
British Academy Film Awards	1	2
Berlin Film Festival	2	2
Cannes Film Festival	1	1
César Awards	1	11
European Film Awards	4	6
Golden Globe Awards	0	3
Lumière Awards	0	3
Screen Actors Guild Awards	0	4
Tony Awards	0	1
Venice Film Festival	1	1
Special awards	5	5
Critics associations	4	13
Wins	15
Nominations	48

Juliette Binoche is a French actress, artist and dancer who throughout her career has received several awards and nominations including one Academy Award, one BAFTA Award and a César Award.

In 1993, she starred in Three Colors: Blue, the first installment of Krzysztof Kieślowski's Three Colours trilogy, for this performance she was nominated for the Golden Globe Award for Best Actress in a Motion Picture – Drama and won the César Award for Best Actress (her first and only César Award to date out of ten nominations) and the Volpi Cup for Best Actress at the 50th Venice International Film Festival. She gained further international acclaim for her role in Anthony Minghella's The English Patient (1996) for which she won the Academy Award for Best Supporting Actress, the BAFTA Award for Best Supporting Actress and the Silver Bear for Best Actress at the 49th Berlin International Film Festival. She received her second Academy Award nomination for Lasse Hallström's Chocolat (2000), for Best Actress. In 2001 she was nominated for the Tony Award for Best Actress in a Play for her role in the 2000s Broadway revival of Harold Pinter's Betrayal.

At the 2010 Cannes Film Festival she won Best Actress for her performance in Abbas Kiarostami's 2010 art film Certified Copy, becoming the first actress to complete the “Europe’s Triple Crown“ (winning at all 3 most prestigious film festivals: Berlin, Cannes, and Venice film festivals for the same categories) for Best Actress.

== Major associations ==
=== Academy Awards ===
Year	Category	Nominated work	Result	Ref.
1996	Best Supporting Actress	The English Patient	Won	
2000	Best Actress	Chocolat	Nominated	

=== British Academy Film Awards ===
Year	Category	Nominated work	Result	Ref.
1996	Best Actress in a Supporting Role	The English Patient	Won	
2000	Best Actress in a Leading Role	Chocolat	Nominated	

=== Golden Globe Awards ===
Year	Category	Nominated work	Result	Ref.
1993	Best Actress in a Motion Picture - Drama	Three Colours: Blue	Nominated	
1996	Best Supporting Actress - Motion Picture	The English Patient	Nominated	
2000	Best Actress in a Motion Picture - Musical or Comedy	Chocolat	Nominated	

=== Screen Actors Guild Awards ===
Year	Category	Nominated work	Result	Ref.
1996	Outstanding Female Actor in a Supporting Role	The English Patient	Nominated	
1996	Outstanding Cast in a Motion Picture	The English Patient	Nominated	
2000	Outstanding Cast in a Motion Picture	Chocolat	Nominated	
2000	Outstanding Female Actor in a Leading Role	Chocolat	Nominated	

=== Tony Awards ===
Year	Category	Nominated work	Result	Ref.
2001	Best Actress in a Play	Betrayal	Nominated	

== Festival awards ==
=== Berlin Film Festival ===
Year	Category	Nominated work	Result	Ref.
1993	Berlinale Camera		Won	
1997	Silver Bear for Best Actress	The English Patient	Won	

=== Cannes Film Festival ===
Year	Category	Nominated work	Result	Ref.
2010	Best Actress	Certified Copy	Won	

=== Venice Film Festival ===
Year	Category	Nominated work	Result	Ref.
1993	Volpi Cup for Best Actress	Three Colors: Blue	Won	

=== Morelia International Film Festival ===
Year	Category	Nominated work	Result	Ref.
2025	Artistic Excellence Award	Life's work	Honored	

=== Karlovy Vary International Film Festival ===
Year	Award	Achievement	Result	Ref.
2026	Crystal Globe for Outstanding Artistic Contribution to World Cinema	Outstanding Artistic Contribution to World Cinema	Honored	

== International awards ==
=== César Awards ===
Year	Category	Nominated work	Result	Ref.
1986	Best Actress	Rendez-vous	Nominated	
1987	Best Actress	Mauvais Sang	Nominated	
1992	Best Actress	Les Amants du Pont-Neuf	Nominated	
1993	Best Actress	Damage	Nominated	
1994	Best Actress	Three Colours: Blue	Won	
1996	Best Actress	The Horseman on the Roof	Nominated	
2001	Best Actress	The Widow of Saint-Pierre	Nominated	
2003	Best Actress	Jet Lag	Nominated	
2015	Best Actress	Clouds of Sils Maria	Nominated	
2018	Best Actress	Let the Sunshine In	Nominated	
2023	Best Actress	Between Two Worlds	Nominated	

=== Goya Awards ===
Year	Category	Nominated work	Result	Ref.
2016	Best Actress	Endless Night	Nominated	
2023	International Goya Award	-	Won	

=== European Film Awards ===
Year	Category	Nominated work	Result	Ref.
1992	Best Actress	Les Amants du Pont-Neuf	Won	
1997	Best Actress	The English Patient	Won	
2000	Jameson People's Choice Award for Best Actress	Chocolat	Won	
2005	Best Actress	Caché	Nominated	
2017	Best Actress	Let the Sunshine In	Nominated	
2019	Achievement in World Cinema Award		Won	

=== Lumière Awards ===
Year	Category	Nominated work	Result	Ref.
2014	Best Actress	Camille Claudel 1915	Nominated	
2015	Best Actress	Clouds of Sils Maria	Nominated	
2018	Best Actress	Let the Sunshine In	Nominated	

== Special awards ==
- 1986 – Prix Romy Schneider
- 2010 – Kerry Film Festival – Maureen O'Hara Award
- 2010 – Cairo International Film Festival – Lifetime achievement
- 2014 – Manaki Brothers Film Festival – Special Golden Camera 300 for contribution in world the Art of Cinema
- 2014 – Locarno International Film Festival – Excellence Award Moët & Chandon

== Various awards and critics associations ==
Year	Association	Category	Nominated work	Result
1996	Chicago Film Critics Association Awards	Best Supporting Actress	The English Patient	Nominated
1996	Dallas-Fort Worth Film Critics Association Awards	Best Supporting Actress	The English Patient	Won
1997	National Board of Review	Best Supporting Actress (shared with Kristin Scott Thomas)	The English Patient	Won
2001	Outer Critics Circle Award	Outstanding Actress in a Play	Betrayal	Nominated
2001	Theatre World Award		Betrayal	Won
2005	London Film Critics Circle Awards	Actress of the Year	Caché	Nominated
2006	British Independent Film Awards	Best Actress	Breaking and Entering	Nominated
2006	St. Louis Gateway Film Critics Association Awards	Best Actress	Breaking and Entering	Nominated
2013	Amanda Award	Best Actress	A Thousand Times Good Night	Nominated
2013	Tallinn Black Nights Film Festival	Best Actress	Camille Claudel 1915	Won
2016	David di Donatello	Best Actress	The Wait	Nominated
2018	Globes de Cristal Awards	Best Actress	Let the Sunshine In	Nominated
