= The Moon and Other Lovers =

- German: Der Mond und andere Liebhaber
- Directed by: Bernd Böhlich
- Written by: Bernd Böhlich
- Produced by: Eva-Marie Martens
- Starring: Katharina Thalbach; Fritzi Haberlandt; Birol Ünel; Detlev Buck
- Music by: Silly
- Release date: 1 May 2008
- Running time: 101 minutes
- Country: Germany
- Language: German

The Moon and Other Lovers (German: Der Mond und andere Liebhaber) is a 2008 German tragicomic film written and directed by Bernd Böhlich. It was entered into the 30th Moscow International Film Festival.

== Cast ==
- Katharina Thalbach as Hanna Lottner
- Fritzi Haberlandt as Daniela 'Dani'
- Birol Ünel as Gansar
- Steffen Scheumann as Knuti
- Andreas Schmidt as Siggi
