= Santiago Amigorena =

Argentine screenwriter

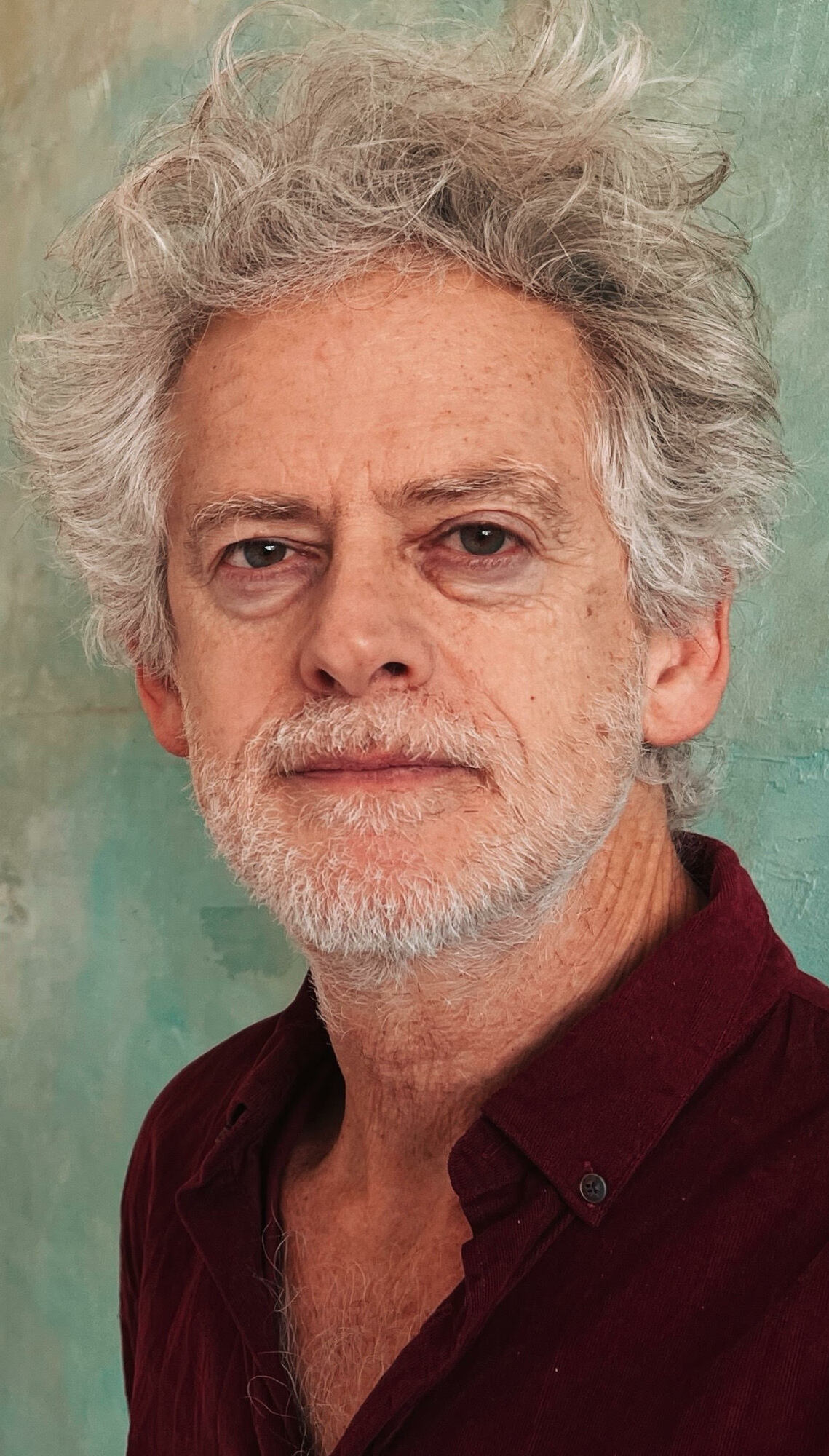
- Born: 15 February 1962 (age 64); Buenos Aires, Argentina
- Occupations: Screenwriter, film producer, film director, actor
- Spouse: Julie Gayet (m. 2003; div. 2006)
- Partner: Juliette Binoche (2005–2009)
- Children: 3

Santiago Amigorena (Spanish pronunciation: [sanˈtjaɣo amiɣoˈɾena]; born 15 February 1962) is an Argentine screenwriter, film producer, film director and writer.

In 2007, he was nominated at the Mar del Plata Film Festival for Best Film with A Few Days in September.

== Family and personal life ==
In 2003, he married actress Julie Gayet, but they divorced in 2006.

== Literary work ==
- Une enfance laconique (1998), P.O.L (ISBN 2-86744-619-8)
- Une jeunesse aphone : les premiers arrangements (2000), P.O.L (ISBN 2-86744-767-4)
- Une adolescence taciturne : le second exil (2002), P.O.L (ISBN 2-86744-868-9)
- Le Premier Amour (2004), P.O.L (ISBN 2-84682-027-9)
- 1978 (2009), P.O.L (ISBN 978-2-84682-308-1)
- La Première Défaite (2012), P.O.L (ISBN 978-2818016640)
- Des jours que je n'ai pas oubliés (2014), P.O.L (ISBN 978-2-8180-2002-9)
- Mes derniers mots (2015), P.O.L (ISBN 978-2-8180-3566-5)
- Les Premières Fois (2016), P.O.L (ISBN 978-28180-4042-3)
- Le Ghetto intérieur (2019), P.O.L (ISBN 978-28180-4782-8)
  Winner of the "Prix des libraires de Nancy" - Le Point, 201911
  Folio Booksellers' Prize, 2021
  Selected for the Prix Goncourt, Prix Renaudot, Prix Médicis 2019
- Il y a un seul amour (2020), Stock (ISBN 978-27578-8739-4)
- Le Premier Exil (2021), P.O.L (ISBN 978-2-8180-5359-1)
  Selected for the Prix Médicis, 2021

== Filmography ==
=== Director and screenwriter ===
- A few days in September (2006)
- Another Silence (2011)
- Les enfants rouges (2014)

=== Screenwriter ===
- La Jalousie, by Christophe Loizillon (1989)
- Jean Galmot, adventurer, by Alain Maline (1990)
- Maigret et la maison du juge (TV movie), by Bertrand Van Effenterre (1992)
- Les gens normaux n'ont rien d'exceptionnel, by Laurence Ferreira Barbosa (1993)
- Maigret et les caves du Majestic (TV movie), by Claude Goretta (1993)
- Le Fils du requin, by Agnès Merlet (1993)
- Le Péril jeune, by Cédric Klapisch (1994)
- Quand les étoiles rencontrent la mer, by Raymond Rajaonarivelo (1996)
- Kini and Adams, by Idrissa Ouedraogo (1997)
- Le Silence de Rak, by Christophe Loizillon (1997)
- After sex, by Brigitte Roüan (1997)
- La voie est libre, by Stéphane Clavier (1998)
- Tokyo Eyes, by Jean-Pierre Limosin (1998)
- La révolution sexuelle n'a pas eu lieu, by Judith Cahen (1999)
- Rien à faire, by Marion Vernoux (1999)
- Peut-être, by Cédric Klapisch (1999)
- Regarde-moi (en face), by Marco Nicoletti (2000)
- Bon plan, by Jérôme Lévy (2000)
- Tu ne marcheas jamais seul, by Gilles Chevallier (2001)
- Ma caméra et moi, by Christophe Loizillon (2002)
- The Wolf of the West Coast, by Hugo Santiago (2002)
- Not for, or Against, by Cédric Klapisch (2002)
- Upside Down, by Juan Diego Solanas (2012)
- Ce qui nous lie, by Cédric Klapisch (2017)
- Si tu voyais son coeur, by Joan Chemla (2017)
- Someone, Somewhere, by Cédric Klapisch (2019)
- Gloomy Eyes by Fernando Maldonado & Jorge Tereso (2019)
- Last Words by Jonathan Nossiter based on Santiago Amigorena's book "Mes derniers mots" (2020)
- Rise by Cédric Klapisch (2022)
