= Family Life (1985 film) =

- ©MK2 1984
- Directed by: Jacques Doillon
- Written by: Jacques Doillon
- Produced by: Jean François Lepetit
- Starring: Sami Frey; Mara Goyet; Juliet Berto; Juliette Binoche
- Cinematography: Michel Carré
- Edited by: Nicole Dedieu; Claude Ronzeau
- Distributed by: 20th Century Fox
- Release date: 13 February 1985
- Running time: 90 min.
- Country: France
- Language: French

Family Life (French: La Vie de Famille) is a 1985 French film by Jacques Doillon.

== Plot ==
On Saturday morning, Emmanuel has a domestic dispute with Natacha, his partner's teenage daughter, before leaving to spend the day with his own daughter, Elise, whom he had with Lili. The father and daughter improvise a trip together.

== Cast ==
- Sami Frey as Emmanuel
- Mara Goyet as Elise
- Juliet Berto as Mara
- Juliette Binoche as Natacha
- Aina Walle as Lili, Elise's mother
- Simon de La Brosse as Cédric

== Production ==
In 2024, Mara Goyet revealed she felt particularly uncomfortable during filming at the age of 10. For her, the atmosphere that reigned on the set was clearly "incestuous".
