= Un tour de manège =

Un Tour de Manège
- Film poster
- Directed by: Pierre Pradinas
- Written by: Pierre Pradinas; Alain Gautré
- Produced by: Robert Guédiguian; Albert Prévost
- Starring: Juliette Binoche; François Cluzet; Denis Lavant; Michel Aumont
- Cinematography: Jean-Pierre Sauvaire
- Edited by: Chantal Delatre
- Music by: Albert Marcoeur
- Distributed by: Gaumont Distribution
- Release date: 29 March 1989
- Running time: 90 minutes
- Country: France
- Language: French

Un Tour de Manège (French pronunciation: [œ̃ tuʁ də manɛʒ]; a.k.a. Roundabout (UK), Once Around the Park (US)) is a 1989 French film starring Juliette Binoche, François Cluzet, Denis Lavant and Michel Aumont. It is the first and to date only film directed by the acclaimed French theatre director Pierre Pradinas. The film was shot on location in Paris in the summer of 1988.

== Plot ==
Al (Francois Cluzet) and Elsa (Juliette Binoche) have been a couple for some time, but the chances that their relationship will be long-lived are few. For one thing, Al is appallingly dependent on Elsa for his every emotional need. For another, Elsa is an incredibly elusive person, extremely difficult to pin down about anything—especially whatever is bothering her. How they have managed to survive this long is a cause for wonder. When Al gets an opportunity to be cast in a movie role, complete with no-cost occupancy in the casting agent's ugly but fashionable apartment, he jumps at the chance to provide a little material satisfaction for his beloved Elsa. But what exactly does she want?
