= Andreas Schmidt (actor) =

German actor and director

Andreas M. Schmidt
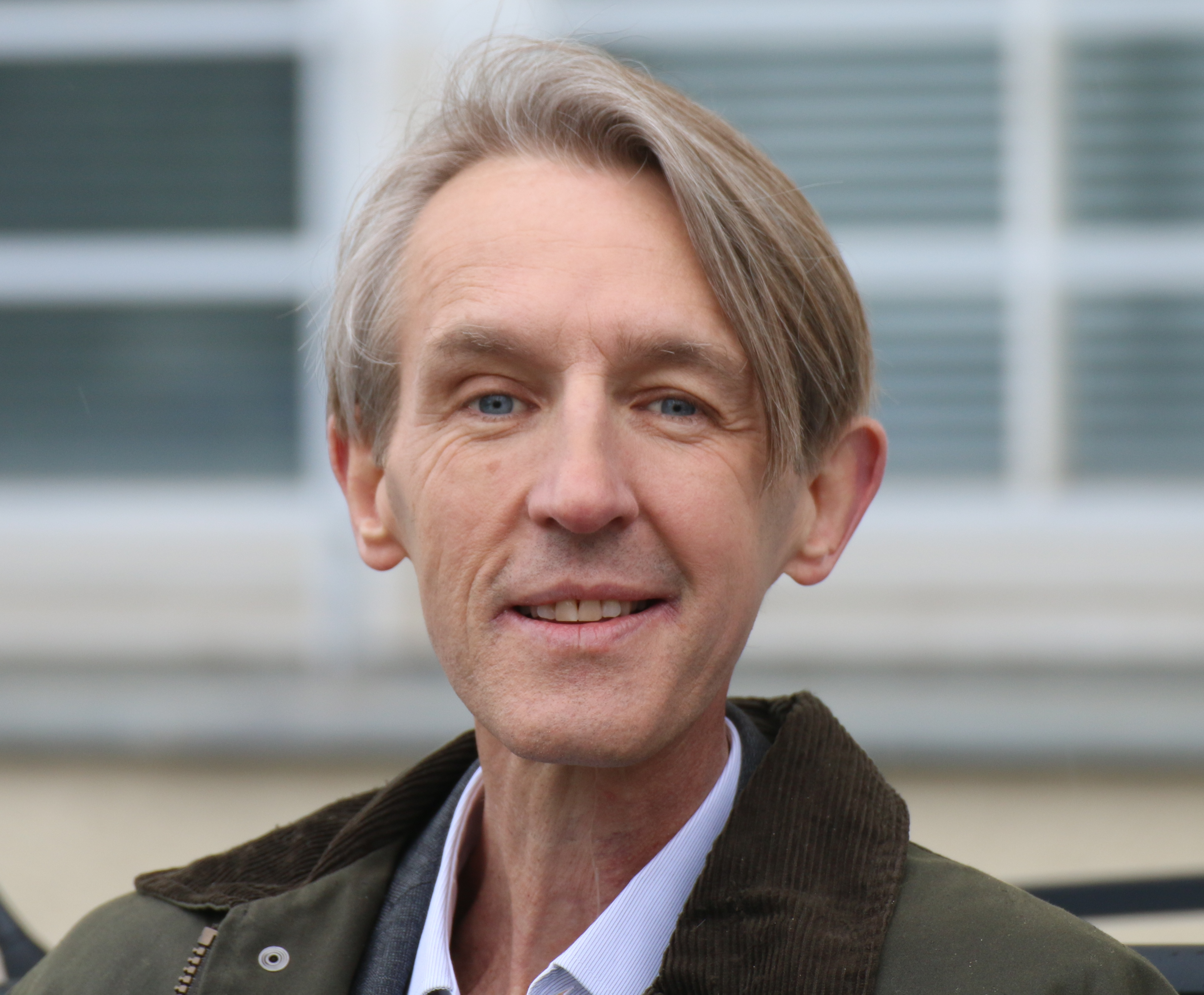
- Schmidt in April 2016
- Born: 23 November 1963; Finnentrop, West Germany
- Died: 28 September 2017 (aged 53); Berlin, Germany
- Occupation(s): Actor, theatre director
- Years active: 1987–2017
- Spouse: Jennifer Schmidt
- Children: 1

Andreas M. Schmidt (23 November 1963 – 28 September 2017) was a German screen actor and theatre director. During his thirty-year career, he appeared in over 130 film and television productions.

== Biography ==
Born in Heggen, Finnentrop, Schmidt grew up in the Märkisches Viertel in West Berlin. He was a singer and guitarist in the rock band Lillies große Liebe in the 1980s. His first acting role was in the 1987 film Bang! You're Dead!. Schmidt received three nominations at the Deutscher Filmpreis, winning once in 2009. Notable film appearances by Schmidt include Sommer vorm Balkon (2005), The Counterfeiters (2007), The Moon and Other Lovers (2008) and Henri 4 (2010). He also had roles in television programs such as Tatort, Der Kriminalist and Polizeiruf 110. In addition, he directed theatre.

Schmidt lived in Kreuzberg, Berlin with his family. He died of cancer on 28 September 2017, at the age of 53. He was survived by his American wife, Jennifer, and their son (born 2008).

== Selected filmography ==
- Bang! You're Dead! (1987) - Möhre (uncredited)
- Linie 1 (1988) - Humphrey
- Stille Betrüger (1989) - Georg
- The Rose Garden (1989) - Vladimir
- Der doppelte Nötzli (1990)
- Schwarzfahrer (1993) .... Passenger with Walkman
- Life Is All You Get (1997) .... Mieter mit Schrank
- Plus-minus null (1998) .... Alex
- Kai Rabe gegen die Vatikankiller (1998) .... F / X Mann
- Gangster (1999) .... Erbse
- Crazy (2000) .... Ricardo
- Conamara (2000) .... Axel
- Planet Alex (2001) .... Harald
- Heidi M. (2001) .... Erich
- Viktor Vogel – Commercial Man (2001) .... Alfi
- 99euro-films (2001) .... (segment "Ein Mann boxt sich durch")
- Julies Geist (2001) .... Hans
- Pigs Will Fly (2002) .... Laxe
- Auszeit (2002) .... Donald
- Eierdiebe (2003) .... Polizeibeamter Zwei
- Alltag (2003) .... Waffenschieber
- Yugotrip (2004) .... Pförtner 2
- Farland (2004) .... Imbissbesitzer Hans
- Am I Sexy? (2004) .... Winnie Marzewski
- Guys and Balls (2004) .... Jürgen
- Folge der Feder! (2004) .... Police Officer 1
- Summer in Berlin (2005) .... Ronald
- No Sweat (2005) .... Toni Neer
- Neandertal (2006) .... Rudi
- Gefangene (2006) .... Vasile
- The Counterfeiters (2007) .... Zilinski
- Rudy: The Return of the Racing Pig (2007) .... Spacko
- Krauts, Doubts & Rock 'n' Roll (2008) .... Gurki
- The Moon and Other Lovers (2008) .... Siggi
- Henri 4 (2010) .... Guillaume du Bartas
- Eines Tages... (2010) .... Stefan Ranft
- A Family of Three (2011) .... Iggy
- A Good Summer (2011) .... Andi Komorowski
- Faust (2011) .... Valentin's Friend
- The Adventures of Huck Finn (2012) .... Sklaventreiber Bill
- Deckname Luna (2012) .... Schoen
- Wetlands (2013) .... Freund der Eltern
- Banklady (2013) .... Uwe
- Sputnik (2013) .... Herr Karl
- To Life! (2014) .... Prof. Werner
- Ente gut! (2016) .... Frank Weiss
- Timm Thaler oder Das verkaufte Lachen (2017) .... Belial
- The Invisibles (2017) .... Hans Winkler (final film role)
