= Another Woman's Life =

- Film poster
- French: La vie d'une autre
- Directed by: Sylvie Testud
- Based on: La Vie d'une Autre by Frédérique Deghelt
- Starring: Juliette Binoche; Mathieu Kassovitz
- Release date: 15 February 2012
- Running time: 97 minutes
- Countries: France; Belgium; Luxembourg
- Language: French

Another Woman's Life (French: La Vie d'une autre) is a 2012 international co-production comedy film directed by Sylvie Testud.

== Cast ==
- Juliette Binoche as Marie Speranski
- Mathieu Kassovitz as Paul Speranski
- Aure Atika as Jeanne
- Danièle Lebrun as Denise Bontant
- Vernon Dobtcheff as Dimitri Speranski
- Yvi Dachary-Le Béon as Adam Speranski
- François Berléand as Lawyer Volin
- Marie-Christine Adam as Babouchka Speranski
- Astrid Whettnall as Simono
