= Du bist nicht allein =

2007 film

- Directed by: Bernd Böhlich
- Starring: Katharina Thalbach; Axel Prahl
- Release date: 19 July 2007
- Running time: 90 min
- Country: Germany
- Language: German

Du bist nicht allein is a 2007 German comedy film directed by Bernd Böhlich.

== Cast ==
- Katharina Thalbach as Frau Moll
- Axel Prahl as Herr Moll
- Yekaterina Medvedeva as Jewgenia Lehmann
- Karoline Eichhorn as Silvia Wellinek
- Herbert Knaup as Kurt Wellinek
- Jürgen Holtz as Herr Klotz
- Victor Choulman as Boris Lehmann
- Leon Kessler as Svenni Moll
- Maria-Victoria Dragus as Tonka
- Mathieu Carrière as Regisseur
- Dominique Horwitz as Trainer
