= A Few Days in September =

- Theatrical poster
- Directed by: Santiago Amigorena
- Written by: Santiago Amigorena
- Produced by: Paulo Branco; Santiago Amigorena
- Starring: Juliette Binoche; John Turturro; Sara Forestier; Tom Riley; Nick Nolte
- Cinematography: Christophe Beaucarne
- Music by: Laurent Martin
- Distributed by: Gemini Films (France); Koch Lorber Films (U.S.)
- Release dates: September 1, 2006 (Venice); September 6, 2006 (France)
- Running time: 112 minutes
- Countries: Italy; France
- Languages: English; French

A Few Days in September (Quelques jours en septembre) is 2006 Italian-French drama film. It is the first film directed by Santiago Amigorena. It premiered out of competition at the 2006 Venice Film Festival and received a special screening at the 2006 Toronto Film Festival.

== Plot ==
A Few Days in September imagines a scenario in which an American C.I.A. agent, Elliot, with advance intelligence about the attacks on New York's World Trade Center towers is being chased by an assassin, William Pound, while he is trying to reunite with his two grown up children with the help of an old colleague, Irène.

== Cast ==
- Juliette Binoche as Irène
- John Turturro as William Pound
- Sara Forestier as Orlando
- Tom Riley as David
- Nick Nolte as Elliot

== Home media ==
Koch-Lorber Films released the film on DVD in the US in 2007. Fledgling distributor Transmedia Pictures gave the film a limited release in the United Kingdom and Ireland, releasing the film on 14 September 2007. It was released on DVD in the UK by High Fliers Films in September 2009. Aztec International released the film in Australia, licensing the DVD rights to Madman Films.

== Alternative versions ==
In September 2007 French language television station TV5 broadcast a reduced version of the film, running at 90 minutes—22 minutes shorter than the original French theatrical version. This version begins on September 6, 2001, when Irène brings Orlando and David to her apartment, removing the opening scene on Orlando's farm and the aborted hotel meeting with Elliot. As such it removes September 5 from the narrative. The version of the film was released in Portugal in November 2006 had a slightly longer running time; A number of extra scenes were included in this version at producer Paulo Branco's request. This version opens with Irène in her apartment receiving a letter from Elliot. It also includes scenes of Orlando target practicing on her farm and of Irène and William Pound sitting in his truck reminiscing on their shared history.

== Reception ==
Reviews of the film were mixed to negative, with Rotten Tomatoes giving the film a 44% rating.
