= An Open Heart (film) =

- Film poster
- French: À cœur ouvert
- Directed by: Marion Laine
- Starring: Juliette Binoche; Édgar Ramírez
- Release date: 15 June 2012
- Running time: 87 minutes
- Country: France
- Language: French

An Open Heart (French: À cœur ouvert) is a 2012 French drama film directed by Marion Laine.

== Cast ==
- Juliette Binoche as Mila
- Édgar Ramírez as Javier
- Hippolyte Girardot as Marc
- Amandine Dewasmes as Christelle
- Aurélia Petit as Sylvie
- Bernard Verley as Masson
