= Les Amants du Pont-Neuf =

1991 French film by Leos Carax

- Film Poster, ©Gaumont 1991
- Directed by: Leos Carax
- Written by: Leos Carax
- Produced by: Christian Fechner
- Starring: Juliette Binoche; Denis Lavant; Klaus Michael Grüber
- Cinematography: Jean-Yves Escoffier
- Edited by: Nelly Quettier
- Music by: Les Rita Mitsouko; David Bowie; Arvo Pärt
- Distributed by: Gaumont Distribution
- Release date: 16 October 1991
- Running time: 125 minutes
- Country: France
- Language: French
- Box office: $38,472

Les Amants du Pont-Neuf (French pronunciation: [lez‿amɑ̃ dy pɔ̃ nœf]) is a 1991 French romantic drama film directed by Leos Carax, starring Juliette Binoche and Denis Lavant. The film follows a love story between two young vagrants: Alex, a would-be circus performer addicted to alcohol and sedatives, and Michèle, a painter with a disease that is slowly turning her blind. The streets, skies and waterways of Paris are used as a backdrop for the story in a series of set-pieces set during the French Bicentennial celebrations in 1989.

The film became notorious for its troubled and lengthy production and for the amount of money it was reported to have cost. It has been referred to several times as the most expensive French film ever made at the time of its release, although this has been contested.

The title refers to the Pont Neuf bridge in Paris. For various reasons, the film-makers ultimately built a scale replica of the bridge, which greatly increased the budget. Though it was released under its original title in other English-speaking territories, the North American title of the film is The Lovers on the Bridge, and, in a mistranslation of the original title, the Australian title is Lovers on the Ninth Bridge (instead of "Lovers on the New Bridge"). (Note: Several critics comment on the bridge's name: "Despite its name, it is the oldest surviving bridge in Paris... it was the first bridge in the city to break with the medieval tradition of constructing a row of houses along each side"; "Despite its name, it is the oldest bridge in Paris, although when it was built (1578–1606) it would have symbolised progress and modernity".)

== Plot ==
Alex is a street performer addicted to alcohol and sedatives; he scrapes together money by fire breathing and performing acrobatics, sometimes simultaneously. Michèle is a painter driven to a life on the streets because of a failed relationship and a disease which is slowly destroying her sight. Accompanied in her new environment only by a cat, she has grown up in a military family but is passionate about art and longs to see Rembrandt's self-portrait in the Louvre before her vision disappears entirely.

The pair's paths first cross when Alex has passed out, drunk, on the Boulevard de Sébastopol and Michèle makes a sketch of him. Later she is dazzled by one of his street exhibitions and the two become an item. The film portrays their harsh existence living on the bridge with Hans, an older vagrant. Hans is initially hostile to Michèle, but he has secret reasons for this. When he warms to her, he uses his former life to help her realise her dream. The capital's festivities for the 1989 bicentennial of the French Revolution happen in the background to the story: while the skies of Paris are lit up with an extravagant fireworks display, Alex steals a speedboat and takes Michèle water-skiing on the Seine.

Alex's love for Michèle proves to have a dark side, however. As her vision deteriorates, she becomes increasingly dependent on him. When a possible treatment for her condition becomes available, Michèle's family use street posters and radio appeals to trace her. Fearing that she will leave him if she receives the treatment, Alex tries to keep Michèle from becoming aware of her family's attempts to find her by burning the posters; but he also sets fire to the van of the bill-sticker putting them up, and the man burns to death. When Alex goes to jail for this and Michèle has surgery, the pair have to separate; then, after his release, they meet up on the bridge for one last time. Alex's love for her is unchanged but Michèle has doubts and, enraged, Alex hurls both of them into the Seine. Underwater, they gaze at each other with new eyes in a moment of connection. A westbound barge picks them up, taking the pair onwards to the Atlantic and a new life.

== Cast ==
- Juliette Binoche as Michèle Stalens
- Denis Lavant as Alex
- Klaus Michael Grüber as Hans
- Marion Stalens as Marion
- Chrichan Larsson as Julien
- Édith Scob as The woman in the car
- Georges Aperghis as The man in the car
- Marie Trintignant as The voice over

== Production ==
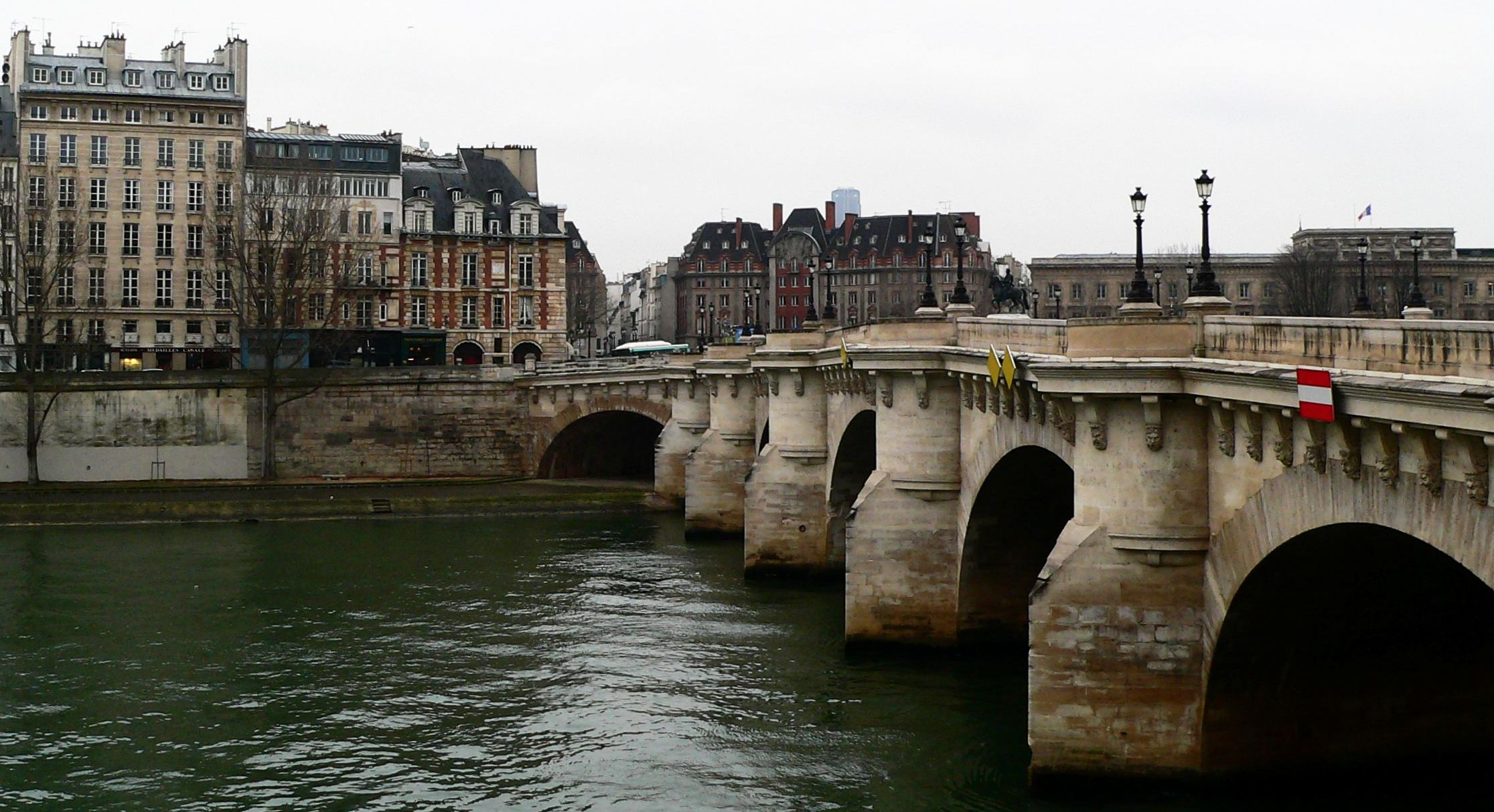
The film is set on the Pont Neuf in Paris.

=== Pre-production ===
When he started planning it in 1987, Leos Carax wanted to make a simple film, originally intending to shoot in black and white and via Super 8. His first feature Boy Meets Girl had been a small affair (costing 3 million francs), whereas Mauvais Sang had been considerably larger and more costly (at 17 million), albeit more successful at the box office.

From the beginning, shooting a movie on a public bridge in the centre of Paris was complicated. The production team wanted to block off the bridge for three months, but the application was rejected. Instead, a model was created by the set designer Michel Vandestien. Initially, the intention was to film the daylight scenes on the actual bridge, and the night-time scenes on the simplified model. At this point, the budget was estimated at 32 million francs. (Note: Jean-Michel Frodon calls this initial budget expensive but not excessive, saying for context that, although the average cost of a French film at this time was 13.5 million francs, 37 other films from 1988 were in the 20-50 million bracket.) After scouting in Orléans and the Paris area for locations to build the set, the film-makers settled on the town of Lansargues, in the department of Hérault in southern France. Construction began in August 1988.

=== First shoot ===
The mayor and police of Paris had authorised filming on the actual Pont Neuf for a period of three to four weeks ending 15 August 1988 (renovation work was to begin on 16 August, so the permit could not be extended). During rehearsals, lead actor Denis Lavant injured his hand so badly that filming could not be completed in the given time. After consultation with the insurers, the solution decided on was to extend the Lansargues model for daytime use.

Although the insurance company made a payment to cover the accident, this extra budget seemed too low given the extent of work required at the Lansargues site. It soon became obvious that more money would be required. In December 1988, production shut down: at this point 14 minutes of footage had been shot.

=== Second shoot ===
In this interim period, Carax circulated videocassettes of the completed footage to create interest, and received praise from film-makers such as Steven Spielberg and Patrice Chéreau, who encouraged him to continue. In June 1989, Dominique Vignet, together with the Swiss millionaire Francis von Buren, agreed to invest 30 million francs based on the rushes filmed the previous year. In July, shooting began again.

Le Figaro called the expanded Pont-Neuf the biggest film set ever built in France. It had a full-scale model of the bridge at its centre and used forced perspective to recreate the streets and buildings on either bank. Details included the bridge's equestrian statue of Henri IV, a facade of the nearby La Samaritaine department store with working lights, the entrance to the local Métro station, and a replica of the adjacent Vert-Galant park with actual trees.

It became apparent that the new injection of cash was not enough for the total cost of construction and to finish the film; sources give the amount of money already spent by this point as 80-90 million francs, and Le Monde calculated that a further 80 would be needed to complete the project. Von Buren withdrew his funding late in 1989 with an estimated loss of 18 million francs. Yet again, production stopped. For nearly a year, the site in Lansargues was almost deserted except for a guard; additionally, a number of storms followed over that winter causing massive water damage to the uncompleted set.

=== Third shoot ===
At the Cannes festival in 1990, Christian Fechner undertook to provide funding in order to finish the film. Unable to find financing partners, he provided his own money, purchasing both rights and debts of the picture. (In the completed film, "Christian Fechner" is the name of the riverboat that rescues the two protagonists.) It was announced that shooting would recommence on 15 August 1990. Recreating the city's fireworks display for Bastille Day in 1989 was among the factors driving up the cost. Filming on the set was completed in December 1990 and production finally ceased in March 1991. To Fechner and Carax's regret, in January 1991 the farmer who owned the site had the entire bridge set destroyed; it had attracted visitors as well as money to the area, and the mayor of Lansargues had hoped it might be preserved.

Estimates of the final budget vary: different sources have given it as 100, 130, 160 and 200 million francs. Fechner was adamant that it was 100 (which still made it the most expensive film made in France that year); Carax, promoting the film in Britain in 1992, contested the figures that the media had reported, while saying that he did not know the film's ultimate cost himself.

Carax and Binoche were a romantic couple at the start of filming, though by the time of release they had split. (Note: In one account, the split happened because Carax wanted a tragic ending for the film with Michèle dead, and Binoche objected to this ("He changed it for her, to something happier, but she left him anyway"), though in another it was Fechner who imposed a happy ending on the director.) To prepare for her role, Binoche (like Lavant) rough-slept in the streets of Paris. (Note: This was at Carax's insistence.) According to Carax, she "insisted" on performing the dangerous water-skiing scene herself (at one point in filming she nearly drowned); she also put her career on hold to make herself available during the lengthy production delays, turning down job offers from Robert De Niro, Elia Kazan and Krzysztof Kieślowski. Binoche was one of the cast and crew members who combined to pay the security guard on the Lansargues site while filming stopped, and was personally involved in fundraising, meeting producers, lawyers and the Minister of Culture. Carax later remembered that in dispirited periods, when he believed the film would never be completed, Binoche revived his morale; she herself remembered that she never lost faith that the film could be made.

The film was the subject of two documentaries: Enquête sur un film au-dessus de tout soupçon by Olivier Guiton and Le Pont-Neuf des amants by Laurent Canches (both 1991).

== Release ==
The film premiered at the 1991 Cannes Film Festival before arriving in French theatres on 16 October 1991. The film had 867,197 admissions in France, where it was the 34th highest earning film of 1991. 260,000 of the tickets sold were in Paris alone.

In 2025, the film received a 4K restoration, supervised by StudioCanal. Janus Films released the restored film in American cinemas.

== Reception ==
=== Domestic ===
The film divided critical opinion in France. In the popular press, while L'Express responded dismissively ("One hundred and sixty-million francs, and for what? One bridge, three tramps and a cat"), Le Monde was enthusiastic ("a film whose form, more than its content, oozes an emotion as pure and immediate as the unforgettable pre-war melodramas"), as was Le Point ("magical, mad, uncompromising, like its creator... [an] artistic miracle"). Le Figaro praised Binoche and Lavant's performances but not the film itself. Among film journals, Marc Esposito in Studio made wounding comments about the film and Carax personally, as did La Revue du Cinéma, but the reaction among what Stuart Klawans calls "auteurist critics" was warmer: Positif was favourable, and Cahiers du Cinéma not only ran a rave review but devoted a special issue to the movie. A factor in the critical hostility was the amount of money reported to have been spent: media sources repeatedly called it the most expensive film in French history, (Note: Multiple sources make this statement. In France there was a political element to this, as some of the budget had been public money, and a heated debate arose in the French media about the conduct of Minister of Culture Jack Lang and the way that homegrown movies were funded. During filming, a member of the public holding a knife approached a crew member, thinking he was Carax. Hostility had existed from an early stage: Wendy Everett calls the granting of the original 32-million budget "a controversial move that attracted widespread criticism and more than a little jealousy".) though Klawans points out that Van Gogh (also released in 1991) had a budget roughly equivalent to the 160 million francs mentioned in the media. (Note: Within a few years, Germinal and The Horseman on the Roof would equal if not exceed its budget.)

=== International ===
In order to recoup its costs, Les Amants needed to do well in overseas markets. It opened in Britain in September 1992, and received positive reviews in The Guardian, The Independent and Empire, though more enthusiastic were Sight and Sound ("exciting and innovative... one of the most visually exhilarating and surprising films of recent years"), The Daily Telegraph ("this strange, beautiful film... shows Carax as one of the most poetic, individual talents in European cinema"), and The Sunday Telegraph ("a glorious monument to the follies of megalomaniac film-making"). The Times felt that, for all its visual charm and unpredictability, the film flagged in its second half, but concluded, "when mediocrity runs riot, cinema desperately needs its movie movies, and Les Amants du Pont Neuf, flaws and all, is the real McCoy".

When it played at the 1992 New York Film Festival, however, influential critic Vincent Canby reviewed the film for The New York Times. (Note: Derek Malcolm called Canby "one of the most powerful film critics in America. A bad review from him... was the death knell for any independent, or foreign, film in the United States".) While praising the technical achievement of Vandestien's set design, and the power of the fireworks and speedboat sequences, he was cool about the film overall:

one of the most extravagant and delirious follies perpetrated on French soil since Marie-Antoinette played the milkmaid at the Petit Trianon. Never has so much money been spent so heedlessly at the whim of so few... [a] huge plywood cream puff of a movie... more exhausting than entertaining.

Klawans, who served on the festival's selection committee, believes that Canby's review harmed the film's USA distribution chances; David Sterritt suggests that potential American distributors were put off by stories of the troubled production and cost overruns. The film played at some other festivals but did not go on release nationwide until 1999. Critics have however seen echoes of specific sequences in successful anglophone films released in the interim: in The English Patient (1996), of Binoche being lifted up to see a painting; in Titanic (1997), of two lovers embracing at the prow of a boat. Klawans concludes that, however few Americans were able to see it, film-makers were studying the movie.

=== 1999 American release ===
When the film finally went on general release in America, after Martin Scorsese had championed it, Klawans in The Nation saluted it as "one of the most splendidly reckless films ever made". CNN.com struck similarly hyperbolic notes: "the sort of multi-leveled exhilaration that can be achieved on film when talented artists bother to give it a go... more flashes of legitimate brilliance than you'll find in a dozen helpings of Armageddon". Kevin Thomas in The Los Angeles Times called the film "a go-for-broke dazzler"; he rated Binoche's performance higher than her Oscar-winning work in The English Patient, as did Marjorie Baumgarten in The Austin Chronicle. In contrast, Charles Taylor in Salon called Binoche "mannered, utterly inauthentic" and Lavant "singularly unappealing", summing up Carax's work by asking "do we have to pretend that his films are about anything more than his second-hand image-mongering?" Richard Corliss in Time praised Binoche, and the film's visual style, but said that "The plot groans with lower-depths anomie"; Lisa Schwarzbaum in Entertainment Weekly called the film an "unwieldy mixture of gorgeousness and incoherence". Roger Ebert was likewise more balanced: "a film both glorious and goofy, inspiring affection and exasperation in nearly equal measure... It is not the masterpiece its defenders claim, nor is it the completely self-indulgent folly described by its critics. It has grand gestures and touching moments of truth, perched precariously on a foundation of horsefeathers."

On the review aggregator website Rotten Tomatoes, 86% of 22 critics' reviews are positive, with an average rating of 7.2/10. The website's consensus reads: "Brash and big-hearted, The Lovers on the Bridge can sweep away most viewers with its mad romanticism."

== Bibliography ==
- Austin, Guy (2008). Contemporary French Cinema: An Introduction (2nd ed.). Manchester; New York: Manchester University Press. ISBN 978-0-7190-4611-7.
- Beugnet, Martine (2000). "Filmer l'exclusion: Les amants du Pont-Neuf, Léos Carax, 1990". Marginalité, sexualité, contrôle: dans le cinéma français contemporain (in French). Paris: L'Harmattan. pp. 157–187. ISBN 2738485553.
- Daly, Fergus; Dowd, Garin (2003). Leos Carax. Manchester; New York: Manchester University Press. ISBN 9781526141590.
- Everett, Wendy (2006). "Les Amants du Pont-Neuf / The Lovers of Pont-Neuf". In Powrie, Phil (ed.). The Cinema of France. London: Wallflower. pp. 207–215. ISBN 1-904764-46-0.
- Frodon, Jean-Michel (1995). L'âge moderne du cinéma français: De la Nouvelle Vague à nos jours (in French). Paris: Flammarion. ISBN 208067112X.
- Hayes, Graeme (1999). "Representation, Masculinity, Nation: The Crises of Les Amants du Pont-Neuf (Carax, 1991)". In Powrie, Phil (ed.). French Cinema in the 1990s: Continuity and Difference. Oxford; New York: Oxford University Press. pp. 199–210. ISBN 0198159587.
- Moullet, Luc (1999). "Les lois secrètes du cinémargent". In Creton, Laurent (ed.). Le cinéma et l'argent (in French). Paris: Nathan. pp. 45–55. ISBN 9-78209-1-90321-7.
- Vincendeau, Ginette (2000). Stars and Stardom in French Cinema. London; New York: Continuum. ISBN 0-8264-4731-7.
