= A Simple Heart (2008 film) =

2008 film

- Film poster
- Directed by: Marion Laine
- Written by: Gustave Flaubert; Marion Laine
- Produced by: Béatrice Caufman; Jean-Michel Rey
- Starring: Sandrine Bonnaire; Marina Foïs
- Cinematography: Guillaume Schiffman
- Edited by: Juliette Welfling
- Music by: Cyril Morin
- Distributed by: Rezo Films
- Release date: 26 March 2008
- Running time: 105 minutes
- Country: France
- Language: French
- Budget: $3.6 million
- Box office: $889,000

A Simple Heart (French: Un cœur simple) is a 2008 French drama film directed by Marion Laine. It is an adaptation of one of Flaubert's Three Tales. The film was entered into the 30th Moscow International Film Festival where it won the Special Jury Prize. It won the Prix Jacques Prévert du Scénario for Best Adaptation in 2009.

== Cast ==
- Sandrine Bonnaire as Félicité
- Marina Foïs as Mathilde Aubain
- Pascal Elbé as Théodore
- Patrick Pineau as Liébard
- Thibault Vinçon as Frédéric
- Noémie Lvovsky as Nastasie
- Michaël Abiteboul as Fabu
- Swann Arlaud as Paul Aubain
