= Sophie Galibert =

French screenwriter, film director and writer

- Born: Lagny-sur-Marne, France
- Occupations: Screenwriter film director
- Years active: 2009–present

Portrait

Sophie Galibert is a French writer-director whose career spans Paris and Los Angeles.

Her debut feature film, Cherry (2022), had its world premiere at the Tribeca Festival, where it won the Audience Award. The film went on to screen at several international festivals before receiving a theatrical release in the United States, followed by streaming releases on STARZ in the U.S. and SOONER in France.

Alongside her film work, Sophie Galibert has directed episodes of several successful French television series, including All For Light (Netflix), Where It All Begins (TF1), and Chronicles Of The Sun (France TV).

A graduate of Gobelins Paris, she began her professional career in film production before embarking on a journey around the world that marked a decisive turning point in her artistic path. Upon returning to France, she chose to dedicate herself fully to writing and directing.

Between 2009 and 2014, she wrote and directed several acclaimed short films, including Icecream, Bouddhi Bouddha, Et Dieu créa la pomme !, and Crevette. The latter became her first international success, screening at numerous festivals around the world and earning several awards for its distinctive visual universe and deeply human characters.

Her work as a director, Sophie Galibert has built a career as a screenwriter. Her screenplay Waterproof won Best Screenplay at the Cineffable Festival, 50's Fever received the Audience Award at the Valence International Screenwriters Festival, and her project Life Mobile was awarded a Cristal at the Crans-Montana Festival. She wrote twice for the Adami Talents program at the Cannes Festival: A/K in 2016 for Belgian director Olivier Van Hoofstadt, and On The Road in 2015 for French director Marion Laine. She was also a finalist for the Audi Talents Awards with her project L’ampoule, which later found new life as a children's book.

Committed to developing her writing and artistic vision, she has taken part in several prestigious international programs for filmmakers and screenwriters, including Berlinale Talents, Reykjavík Talents, Le Groupe Ouest Développement, and the Conservatoire Européen d’Écriture Audiovisuelle (CEEA).

In 2017, Sophie Galibert moved to Los Angeles to develop projects between France and the United States while continuing to collaborate with the European film industry.

Sophie Galibert is currently developing several new feature films. Shimmer is in development with Spiral Stairs Entertainment in the U.S. and was presented at Gotham Week 2025.

Grizzly, produced by Momentum Entertainment in France, took part in the Les Arcs Film Festival Coproduction Village in 2024 and the TorinoFilmLab Boost IT program in 2025.

She is represented by Zero Gravity Management in the United States and CinéArt in France.

== Filmography ==
=== As a screenwriter ===
- Icecream (2010)
- Et dieu créa la pomme ! (2012)
- Bouddhi Bouddha (2012)
- Il était une fin... (2013)
- Crevette (Shrimp) (2014)
- On the road (2015) directed by Marion Laine
- A/K (2016) directed by Olivier Van Hoofstadt (fr)
- What the hell? (2016)
- Cherry (2022)

=== As a director ===
- Icecream (2010)
- Et dieu créa la pomme ! (2012)
- Bouddhi Bouddha (2012)
- Il était une fin... (2013)
- Waterproof (2014)
- Crevette (Shrimp) (2014)
- What the hell? (2016)
- Hollywounded (2019)
- Cherry (2022)

=== TV Shows ===
- All for Light
- Chronicles of the Sun
- Where It All Begins

== Children's book ==
- Le crabe et la princesse, 2016
- Nina and the magic photo booth, 2020
