= Gabriel Garran =

French actor and theatre director (1929–2022)

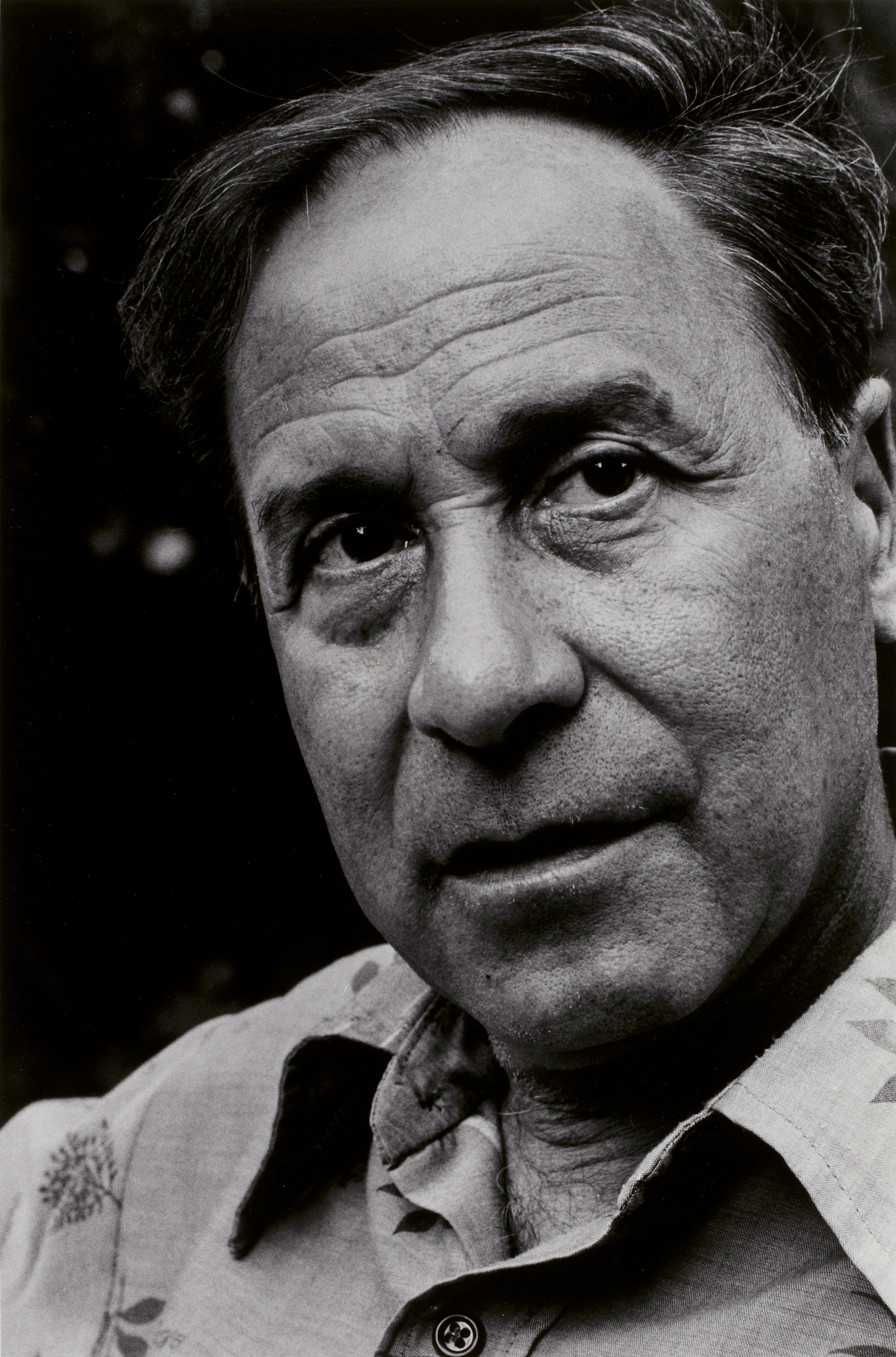
Portrait of Gabriel Garran by Fernand Michaud

Gabriel Garran (pseudonym of Gabriel Gersztenkorn; 3 May 1929 – 6 May 2022) was a French actor and theatre director.

== Biography ==
Born to a French Jewish family of Polish origins in Paris, he fled persecution in Vichy France at the age of 11. After World War II, he became an actor and in 1965 founded the 'Théâtre de la Commune' in Aubervilliers, the first permanent theater in French suburbs. He managed that theater in the years 1960–1984 and staged numerous plays in it. At the end of the 1970s, Garran founded the Théâtre International de Langue Française (TILF) which focused on presenting plays from African French-speaking countries.

== Cinema ==
=== Assistant director ===
- 1962: Adieu Philippine, directed by Jacques Rozier
- 1962: Janine, short film by Maurice Pialat

=== Director ===
- 1983: Brûler les planches

== Books ==
- Le Rire Du Fou. Paris: C. Bourgois, 1976. ISBN 2267000245
- Géographie française. Paris: Flammarion, 2014. ISBN 9782081310001
- Filiation. Paris: Riveneuve. 2017. ISBN 978-2-36013-446-5
