= Bernd Böhlich =

German film director

- Born: 25 April 1957 (age 69); Löbau, East Germany
- Occupation: Director
- Years active: 1983-present

Bernd Böhlich (born 25 April 1957) is a German film director. He has directed more than thirty films since 1983.

== Selected filmography ==
- Landschaft mit Dornen (1992, TV film)
- Deadly Silence (1996, TV film)
- Child Murder (1997, TV film)
- The Publisher (2001, TV film)
- Du bist nicht allein (2007)
- The Moon and Other Lovers (2008)
- Fly Away (2012)
- Sealed Lips (2018)
