= Martine Beugnet =

French theorist and professor

Martine Beugnet is a French film theorist, and a Professor in Visual Studies at the Paris Diderot University. She has written primarily on corporeality and sensation in avant-garde and narrative cinema, and has had her work published in several film journals. She wrote her PhD thesis at the University of Edinburgh in 1999, on themes of sexuality and bodies in recent French cinema, citing filmmakers such as Claire Denis, Bertrand Blier, Jean-Jacques Beineix, Laetitia Masson, and Leos Carax. She later wrote an entire monograph on the work of Claire Denis, where she invoked the film theory of French philosopher Gilles Deleuze. In 2005, she published a book on cinematic treatments of Marcel Proust, written in collaboration with Marion Schmid. Two years later, she wrote a book titled Cinema and Sensation, where she further explored themes she had written about in her PhD thesis, again invoking Deleuze.

== Bibliography ==
- Sexualité, marginalité, contrôle: cinéma français contemporain (L'Harmattan, 2000)
- Claire Denis (Manchester University Press, 2004)
- Proust at the Movies, with Dr Marion Schmid (Ashgate, 2005)
- Cinema and Sensation: French Film and the Art of Transgression (Edinburgh University Press, 2007)
