= Marion Laine =

French actor, screenwriter and film director

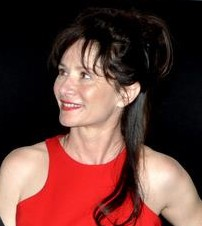
- Occupations: Actor; Film director
- Years active: 1991-present

Marion Laine is a French actor, screenwriter and film director. Her 2008 film A Simple Heart was entered into the 30th Moscow International Film Festival where it won the Special Jury Prize.

== Filmography ==
=== As an actor ===
- Équipe de nuit (1991)
- Merci la vie (1991)
- Sic transit (1991)
- Les Merisiers (1992)
- Revivre (1992)
- Je suis ton châtiment (1996)
- Le Contre-ciel (1996)
- Julie Lescaut (1996, one TV episode)
- Le R.I.F. (1996, one TV episode)
- Madame le Proviseur (1996, one TV episode)
- Dossier: disparus (1998, one TV episode)
- Pour mon fils (1998, one TV episode)
- Rendez-vous (2004, short film)

=== As a screenwriter ===
- Derriere la porte (1999, short film)
- Hotel des acacias (2003, short film)
- A Simple Heart (2008)
- Des vents contraires (2011)
- Le fil d'Ariane (2012)
- An Open Heart, (2012)

=== As a director ===
- Derrière la porte (1999, short film)
- Hotel des acacias (2003, short film)
- A Simple Heart (2008)
- Des vents contraires (2011)
- Le fil d'Ariane (2012)
- An Open Heart (2012)
- On the road to paradise (2015, written by Sophie Galibert)
