= Women in Morocco =

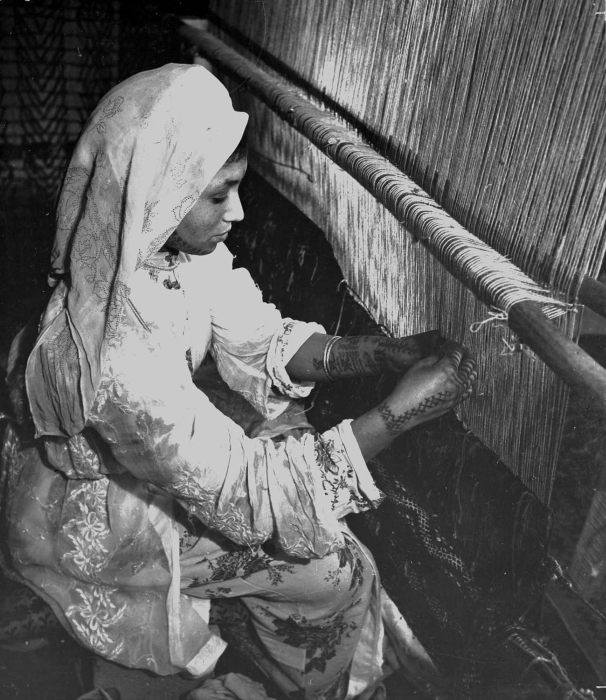
- A Moroccan woman practicing the traditional weaving, Middle Atlas, 1955

General statistics
- Maternal mortality (per 100,000): 100 (2010)
- Women in parliament: 11.0% (2013)
- Women over 25 with secondary education: 20.1% (2012)
- Women in labour force: 43.0% (2012)

Gender Inequality Index
- Value: 0.425 (2021)
- Rank: 104th out of 191

Global Gender Gap Index
- Value: 0.624 (2022)
- Rank: 136th out of 146

The history of women in Morocco can be divided into periods: before, during, and after the arrival of Islam.

After Morocco's independence from France, Moroccan women were able to start going to schools that focused on teaching more than simply religion, expanding their education to the sciences and other subjects.

Upon the institution of the legal code known as Mudawana in 2004, Moroccan women obtained the rights to divorce their husbands, to child custody, to child support, and to own and inherit property. The law made progressive reforms on the status of women, but "substantial inequality and discrimination persist, particularly in unequal access to divorce for women, financial relationships between spouses, and child custody and guardianship."

== Amazigh women in Morocco ==
Prior to the spread of Islam in Morocco, which started with the Arab conquest in the late 7th century CE, Morocco was part of a region inhabited mostly by non-Arab Amazigh populations. Various Amazigh tribes during the 4th, 5th, and 6th century are said to have been matrilineal, such as the Tuareg tribes of the Sahara and Sahel regions. As such, Amazigh women took on significant roles in local communities. A historical example is the figure of Kahina, a legendary Amazigh female military leader who fought against the Arab expansion into North Africa.

The jewellery of the Berber cultures is a style of traditional jewellery worn by women and girls in areas inhabited by indigenous Amazigh people. Following long social and cultural traditions, the silversmiths of such ethnic groups created intricate jewellery to adorn their female customers. Traditional rural Amazigh jewellery was usually made of silver and includes elaborate triangular fibula brooches, originally used as clasps for garments, as well as necklaces, bracelets, earrings and similar items.

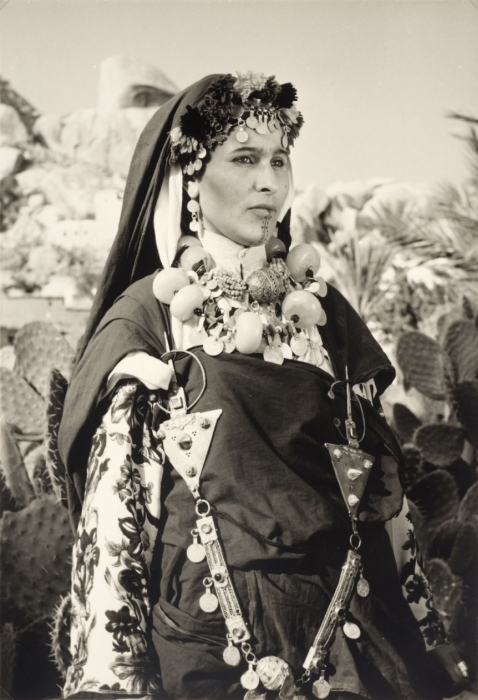
An Amazigh woman with tattoo, traditional jewellery and dress in southern Morocco, c. 1950

Amazigh women also have had a lasting position in Moroccan folklore. It is believed that the tale of Aisha Qandisha has existed since at least the 7th century. There are several variations of Aisha Qandisha's name, which include Lalla Aicha and Aicha Hamdouchia. Stemming from the pre-Islamic era of Morocco, Aisha Qandisha is believed to be a female demon that takes the shape of multiple beings, including a half-goat. Unlike other demons in Moroccan folklore, Aicha Qandisha appears mostly in men's dreams and is said to make a man impotent. Such folklore remains widely popular in Morocco today, especially with children.

In her study about Amazigh women's social and cultural roles in the Ait Kabbash tribe in southern Morocco, art historian Cynthia Becker wrote:

In fact, women in North Africa and more specifically, Amazigh women, have always been active agents who influence both the domestic and the public sphere. They play an important role in their communities by providing commodities such as tents, clothing, rugs, sacks, and ceramic pots, in addition to acting as healers, marriage brokers, midwives, cooks, agriculturalists, and pastoralists.

— Cynthia Becker, Amazigh Arts in Morocco. Women shaping Berber identity

== Establishment of Islamic institutions (680-900) ==
Following the Arab expansion into the Maghreb region, some women took on significant roles in the institutional foundation of landmarks that continue to function today. Fatima al-Fihri, for example, is credited for founding the Karaouine mosque in Fes in 859, which in later centuries developed into the "world's first academic degree-granting institution of higher education". Fatima's sister, Mariam al-Fihri, also founded the al-Andalus Mosque in Fes.

== European imperial expansion and forms of colonialism (1600-1956) ==
As part of a broader French imperialist project that brought about the French occupation of Morocco and the Maghreb region in general, European narratives on Moroccan women were often fixated on Orientalist images. Dominant narratives described Moroccan women as docile, oppressed, and in need of being saved. Consequently, Moroccan women's experience of life under French influence was a result of multiple intersections of power and patriarchy. For example, following a growing trend of French land expropriation and economic hardship, which drove rural Moroccan families out of their homes and land, many Moroccan women migrated to the urban areas in search of economic opportunity, especially to Casablanca and other major cities. Upon migrating to Casablanca, some of them were forced into prostitution, due to their lack of formal identification documents — a policy that the French instituted.

=== Women in anti-colonial resistance ===
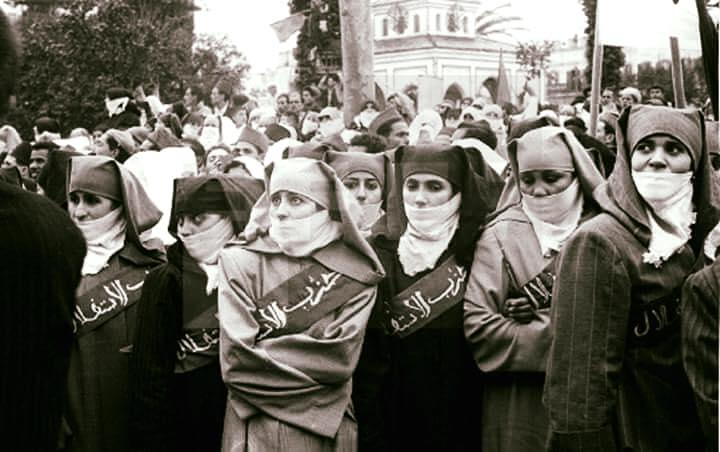
Women of the Istiqlal Party in Tétouan, 11 January 1944

Just as Moroccan women were subject to a gendered form of colonialism, their resistance was gendered as well. The oral traditions of Moroccan women were a unique form of disseminating stories of resistance, oftentimes inspired by oral traditions of female warriors who fought in early Islamic history, such as the stories of Hind and Sukayna. Moroccan women, for example those involved in the armed resistance against Spanish colonial rule in the northern Rif region, adopted their own experiences of fighting against colonialism to existing frameworks of oral traditions that address women in war. The storytelling of these events played a significant role in shaping memories and conceptualizing post-colonial identities among women.

In addition to the oral traditions of women involved in armed resistance, a role that mostly lower-class women took up, upper class Moroccan women were heavily involved in the nationalist politics of resisting colonialism. The Istiqlal Party was the primary mobilizing political force in Morocco that rallied against French colonial rule. The party included the participation of various elite Moroccan women from wealthy and educated families, such as Malika Al-Fassi, from the still influential Al-Fassi family. There was a close collaboration between women like Malika Al-Fassi, who were important figures in the political resistance, and women such as Fatima Roudania, a working-class armed resistance fighter. The wealthier women involved with the Istiqlal Party provided educational services to lower-class women involved in the armed resistance, assisted in the proliferation of nationalist literature and knowledge production, and provided protection by hiding women who were fighting against the French.

Many of the Moroccan women involved in resisting French colonialism oftentimes looked to the public presence of women in struggles of resistance in the region for inspiration, such as in Algeria and Palestine, including women like Djamila Bouhired and Leila Khaled.

== Independence (1956-present) ==
=== Literature, knowledge production, artistic expression ===
Following independence from France in 1956, Moroccan women were at the forefront of knowledge production and artistic expression—all of which nuanced the conception and perception of a post-colonial Moroccan identity. Fatima Mernissi, for example, emerged as a critical figure in the knowledge production on gender studies in Morocco. Laila Lalami has also become a popular figure in literature on Morocco, being the first Moroccan author to publish a book of fiction in English. Other Moroccan women who gained prominence through their published work include Leila Abouzeid, Latifa Baka, Khnata Bennouna, Farida Diouri, and Bahaa Trabelsi.

Moroccan women artists also gained regional and international popularity, including Lalla Essaydi, Samira Said, Amel Bent, Najat Aatabou, Dounia Batma, and Naima Samih, among others.

Despite this, literacy rates for adult women still lag behind men, (almost 70% for women and 85% for men) and a lower percentage of women above 25 have a high school education as opposed to men (45.7% of men and 32.7% of women).

=== Women in politics ===
In addition to art and literature, Moroccan women have been publicly present in shaping contemporary politics. In 1961, the Union Progresiste des Femmes Marocaines emerged as one of the first exclusively female organizations in Morocco. Princess Lalla Aicha, the late sister of the late King Hassan II, was the president of another woman's organization called the Union Nationale des Femmes Marocaines. Various other woman's organizations in Morocco were created after independence with the aim of advancing the cause of women's rights, such as the Democratic Association of Moroccan Women and the Union de l'Action Feminine.

Various Moroccan women have held positions in the government, cabinet, and high ranks in political parties, including Asma Chaabi, Nawal El Moutawakel, Bassima Hakkaoui, Nouzha Skalli, and Mbarka Bouaida, among others. Also, Moroccan women have been at the forefront of dissent and the opposition, sometimes facing jail and harassment from the Moroccan government. Among those are Nadia Yassine of the Moroccan Islamist movement Al Adl Wa Al Ihssane (Justice and Spirituality) and the human rights activist Khadija Ryadi. During the beginning of Morocco's version of the Arab Uprisings that began in December 2010 following the self-immolation of Tunisian fruit vendor Mohammed Bouazizi, an unmarried Moroccan mother, Fadoua Laroui, set herself on fire in front of a municipal office in protest of her public housing application getting rejected. Laroui has been dubbed by some as the "Moroccan female Bouazizi".

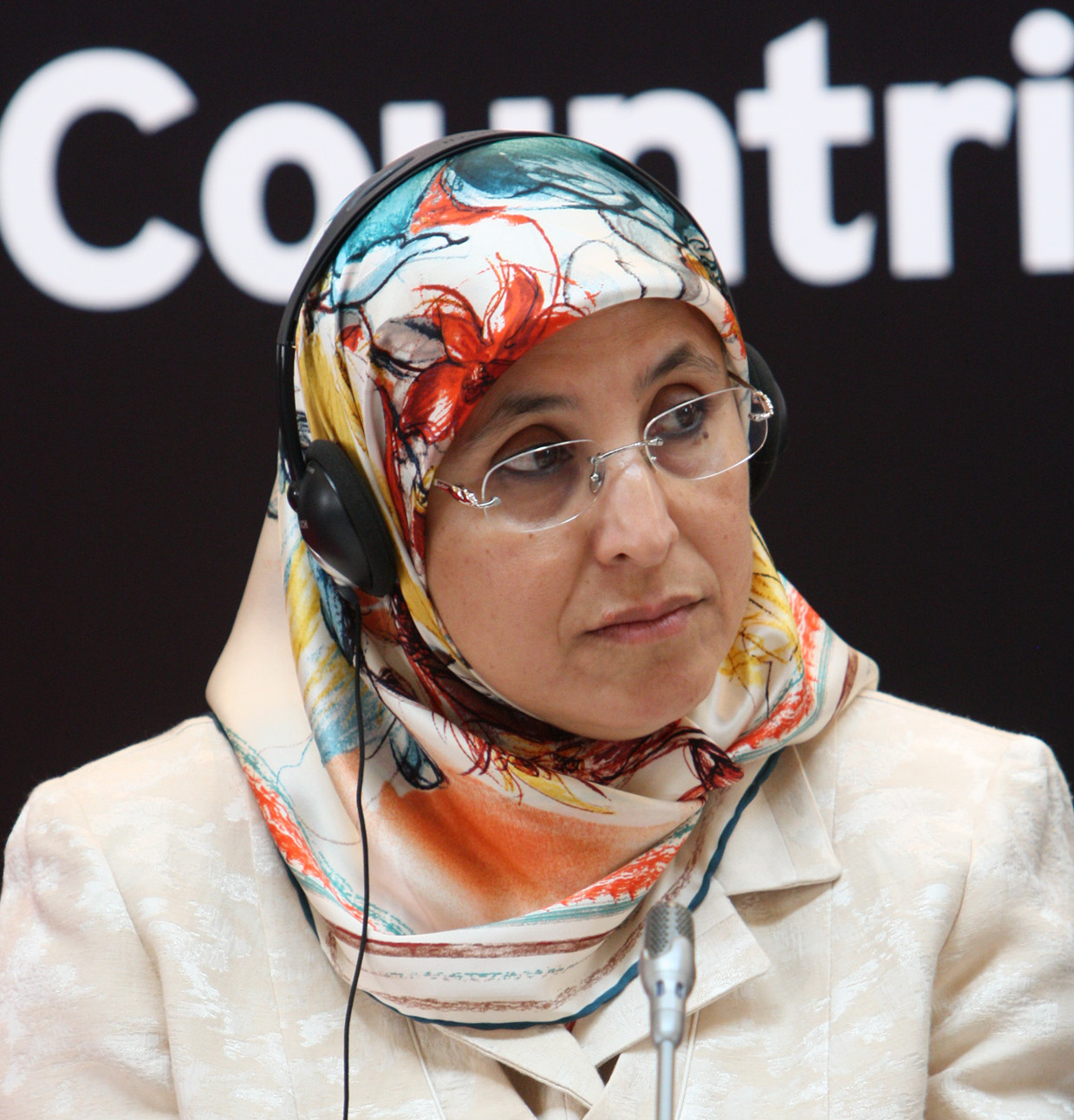
Bassima Hakkaoui, former Moroccan Minister for Solidarity, Women, Family and Social Development of the Justice and Development Party.

Despite the fact that Morocco ratified the Convention on the Elimination of All Forms of Discrimination Against Women (CEDAW), the political representation of women in Morocco remains relatively low. Following the November 2011 elections, only one woman was appointed minister. Like other neighboring countries, Morocco introduced Law n° 59–11 in 2011, which created a quota system that allocated one-third of the seats in the Lower House of Parliament to women. As a result, 66 of the 395 seats in the Lower House of Parliament belong to women as of the November 2011 elections.

Due to this increased political voice, women's representation in parliament has increased dramatically, from 1% in 2003 to 17% in 2015; Morocco's 2004 Family Code (Moudawana) is one of the most progressive in the Arab world; in 1993, Morocco ratified an international agreement on gender equality that has provided leverage for further progress in domestic legislation.

Following the increase in representation, Morocco has seen improvements in women's health and social outcomes: the fertility rate is now one of the lowest in the region; the maternal mortality rate fell by two-thirds in just two decades; girls' primary school enrolment rose from 52% in 1991 to 112% in 2012 (due to re-enrolment); and just under 23% of women are in formal employment (2011).

Outside the realm of formal politics, Moroccan women have been active in various advocacy projects and legal reforms. Most notably, following the suicide of Amina Filali, a young girl who was forced to marry her rapist, various Moroccan woman organizations, such as Union de l'Action Feminine, pushed for the reform of Article 475 from Morocco's penal code. Prior to the national campaign, Article 475 was the law cited by the judge in Amina Filali's case that stated a rapist may be acquitted of charges if he marries his victim. The campaign led to the repeal of Article 475 in January 2014.

Moroccan women have also been active in lobbying for reforms to the personal status code laws (Mudawana). It was initially codified following Morocco's independence from France and was used as a tool for the state's immediate consolidation of power. Following Mohammed VI's accession to the throne in 1999, reforming the Mudawana was a major platform that guided the early years of his reign. Various women's organizations supported these measures, such as l'Union de l'Action Féminine (UAF) and Association Marocaine pour les Droits des Femmes (ADFM). In 2004, reforms in the new Mudawana included stricter measures for men wanting to marry additional wives, greater leniency for a divorce initiated by the wife, more equitable inheritance rights for women, and the increase in the legal age of marriage for women. The reception of these reforms to the Mudawana varied across class lines and the political spectrum. While members of the aforementioned UAF and ADFM championed these measures, various groups, such as the Islamist Al Adl Wa Al Ihsanne, opposed these measures, claiming the reforms were "Western-inspired" and rooted in the neoliberal feminist measures of the World Bank.

On 29 September 2026 Fatima Ezzahra El Mansouri was appointed the first woman prime minister after her victory in the general election.

=== Current laws on abortion in Morocco ===
Abortion is illegal in Morocco except if the mother's life is at risk. According to Article 453 of the Penal Code, abortion is only allowed if the mother's physical health is threatened but the authorisation of a physician and the spouse is still required. A woman who undergoes an abortion for any other reason could face six months to two years in prison and the doctor who performs the procedure could be imprisoned for up to 5 years.

=== Proposed reforms ===
An amendment to Morocco's abortion law was put forward in 2015 after the minister of Islamic Affairs and Justice was ordered by King Mohamed VI to propose a new law for abortions that would permit abortions in the case of rape, incest and foetal impairment. This national debate was sparked by the activism of Dr. Chafik Chraibi, the former head of the department of obstetrics and gynaecology at a state maternity hospital in Rabat who founded the non-profit organisation the Moroccan Association for the Fight Against Clandestine Abortion (AMLAC). A report by the organisation revealed that between 600-800 illegal abortions were being performed daily nationwide.

The proposed laws have still not been passed. A national debate was sparked again following the death of a 14-year-old girl called Meriem who became pregnant after being raped then died following a clandestine abortion on 6 September 2022. An organisation campaigning for social change, Moroccan Outlaws 490, announced 20 September 2022 as a day of national mourning for Meriem and people used #Meriem (مريم) to express their condolences as well as wishes for the law to change.

=== Controversies ===
Hajar Raissouni, a journalist, was arrested in 2019 and sentenced to a year in prison for allegedly having an illegal abortion and sex out of wedlock. She was later pardoned by King Mohammed VI.

=== Harassment ===
Women in Morocco are often forced to endure harassment when they go out in public. Often the sexual harassment takes the form of name calling. To fight this abusive, misogynistic culture, a number of Moroccan women have stood up to their abusers. The culture of sitting at a café had been dominated by men for a long time. It is only during the recent two decades that seeing women mixing with men in cafés in urban cities, such as Marrakech, Tangier, Rabat or Casablanca, became socially acceptable. There is also a demand to uphold the law to ensure the safety of women, and to punish the abusers. Although a law protects women from abuse, the real problem is that there is no tangible intention to pursue or apply it. In 2018 a law went into effect throughout Morocco known as the Hakkaoui law, drafted by Bassima Hakkaoui; it includes a ban on sexual harassment in public places, as well as a ban on forced marriage and harsher penalties for certain forms of violence. But it was criticized for requiring victims to file for criminal prosecution to get protection.

=== Social movements against harassment ===
There are many organisations that campaign against the harassment faced by women in Morocco daily and some of them have even created mobile applications in an effort to make Morocco a safer place for women.

In 2016, a woman named Nidal Azhari who founded the Free Feminist Union Union féministe libre, created an app called Manchoufouch, which means "Can I watch you?" in Darija (Moroccan Arabic). After being verbally harassed by a man using this phrase whilst with friends in Meknes, she was inspired to create the app which allows people to anonymously report verbal and physical harassment. The user must create an account before registering an incident and then they can report either as a victim or a witness. The UFL can also assist them with legal proceedings. You can also change or delete your report at any time and the app is available both in Darija and French.

In 2018, another app called Finemchi was launched by Safaa El Jazouli. 'Finemchi' means 'Where should I go?' in Moroccan Arabic and it has been described as Trip Advisor for women's safety. The app can be downloaded onto mobile phones and women can review establishments and rate them depending on how female friendly they are.

=== Contraception ===
Many forms of contraception are available in Morocco such as; hormonal contraceptives, intrauterine devices (IUD), birth control patches, birth control implants, the vaginal ring and condoms.

According to article 490, any persons of the opposite sex who are not related by marriage and have sexual relations with each other can be punished by imprisonment for one month to one year. Since sex before marriage is illegal, the available data doesn't show how many single women in Morocco use contraception. However, it has been shown that 71% of married women use some form of contraception and this is usually hormonal contraception because when women seek birth control from physicians, they are most likely to be prescribed normal birth control than any other method. There are also many forms of contraception available in pharmacies and health clinics, but people may not feel comfortable accessing these services, especially single women, given that sex before marriage is not just taboo but illegal. It was revealed in a study conducted by Menassat (a sociology research institution based in Casablanca) in 2021 that, even though 76.3% of people surveyed declared that consensual, sexual relations were widespread in Morocco, 80% of them still view virginity as a proof of chastity, religiosity and good upbringing. Due to the beliefs around virginity that prevail in modern Moroccan society and the fact that some women don’t want to ask a doctor for hormonal contraception, it is not uncommon for some Moroccans to take hormonal medication without a prescription which can potentially be dangerous.

It's widely acknowledged that, generally speaking, when the public are educated on contraception and family planning it decrease the demand for abortions. Morocco are putting efforts into educating not only the public but also doctors so that they can recommend methods of contraception other than hormonal birth control which can have many side effects. Emergency contraception is available in Morocco but not widely used due to a lack of knowledge that it exists and how to access it.

Associations such as the Moroccan Association of Family Planning are working to educate people to understand that contraception is not just an issue for women, especially since their studies show that only 50% of young Moroccan men regularly use a condom. They also campaign to improve access to sexual and reproductive health services for migrants and refugees living in Morocco.

Following the World Health Organisation’s publication ‘guideline on self-care interventions for health and well-being’, Morocco was the first country in the world to launch a pilot project to introduce self-administered injectable contraception in November 2021. The project has now been completed and was successful. Injectable contraception was already available in Morocco but it had to be administered by a health care professional. This project allowed women to inject themselves and the protection lasted for 12 weeks at a time. Health professionals where also trained on how to show patients how to inject themselves. Next steps are now being discussed to see how this method of contraception can be distributed more widely.

== See also ==
- Femmes du Maroc, a monthly Moroccan women's magazine
- Bouchra Abdou
- Women in Africa
