= 61st Venice International Film Festival =

Italian film festival in 2004

- Festival poster
- Opening film: The Terminal
- Closing film: Steamboy
- Location: Venice, Italy
- Founded: 1932
- Awards: Golden Lion: Vera Drake
- Hosted by: Claudia Gerini
- Artistic director: Marco Müller
- Festival date: 1–11 September 2004
- Website: Website

Venice Film Festival chronology
- 62nd 60th

The 61st annual Venice International Film Festival, was held from 1 and 11 September 2004, at Venice Lido in Italy.

British filmmaker John Boorman was the jury president for the main competition. The Golden Lion was awarded to Vera Drake, directed by Mike Leigh.

On this edition, a new independent section, Venice Days (Giornate degli autori), was created "for free cinema, new talents and new stories". This section is organized by the ANAC (National Association of Cinematographic Authors) and the API (Independent Authors & Producers).

Also in this edition, The Secret History of Italian Cinema was launched, a new official retrospective section, with the aim of restoring and systematically rediscovering sides of the Italian cinema that have been "forgotten, invisible, unknown or misunderstood". The retrospective was planned for the following four editions (61st to 64th editions), later was extended with the These Phantoms: Italian Cinema Rediscovered (65th edition), and the Italian Comedy Retrospective (66th edition). The Fondazione Prada was the main sponsor/partner of this section.

The festival opened with The Terminal by Steven Spielberg, and closed with Steamboy by Katsuhiro Otomo.

== Juries ==
=== Main Competition (Venezia 61) ===
- John Boorman, British filmmaker - Jury President
- Wolfgang Becker, German filmmaker
- Mimmo Calopresti, Italian director
- Hsu Feng, Taiwanese actress and producer
- Scarlett Johansson, American actress
- Spike Lee, American filmmaker, actor and producer
- Dusan Makavejev, Serbian filmmaker
- Helen Mirren, British actress
- Pietro Scalia, Italian editor

=== Orizzonti ===
- Nicolas Philibert, French director - Jury President
- Brian Helgeland, American director
- Fiorella Infascelli, Italian director

=== Venezia Cinema Digitale ===
- Mike Figgis, British filmmaker and composer - Jury President
- Shozo Ichiyama, Japanese film producer
- Claire Simon, French filmmaker

== Official Sections ==
=== In Competition ===
The following films were selected for the main competition:

English title	Original title	Director(s)	Production country
3-Iron	빈집	Kim Ki-duk	South Korea, Japan
5x2	Cinq fois deux	François Ozon	France
Another Life	Ovunque sei	Michele Placido	Italy
Birth		Jonathan Glazer	United States
Café Lumière	珈琲時光	Hou Hsiao-hsien	Japan, Taiwan
Delivery		Nicos Panayotopoulos	Greece
Howl's Moving Castle	ハウルの動く城	Hayao Miyazaki	Japan
The Intruder	L'intrus	Claire Denis	France
The Keys to the House	Le chiavi di casa	Gianni Amelio	Italy, France, Germany
Kings and Queen	Rois et reine	Arnaud Desplechin	France
Land of Plenty		Wim Wenders	United States
Low Life	하류인생	Im Kwon-taek	South Korea
One Long Winter Without Fire †	Tout un hiver sans feu	Greg Zglinski	Switzerland
Palindromes		Todd Solondz	United States
Promised Land	הארץ המובטחת	Amos Gitai	Israel, France
Remote Access	Удалённый доступ	Svetlana Proskurina	Russia
The Sea Inside	Mar adentro	Alejandro Amenábar	Spain, France, Italy
Stray Dogs	Sag-haye velgard	Marzieh Meshkini	Iran, France, Afghanistan
Vanity Fair		Mira Nair	United Kingdom, United States
Vera Drake		Mike Leigh	United Kingdom
Working Slowly (Radio Alice)	Lavorare con lentezza	Guido Chiesa	Italy
The World	世界	Jia Zhangke	China

† indicates films that competed for the Lion of the Future.

=== Out of Competition ===
The following films were selected to be screened out of competition:

English title	Original title	Director(s)	Production country
The Bridesmaid	La demoiselle d'honneur	Claude Chabrol	France, Italy, Germany
Collateral		Michael Mann	United States
Eros		Michelangelo Antonioni, Steven Soderbergh and Wong Kar-wai	France, Hong Kong, Italy, United States
The Fifth Empire	O quinto imperio	Manoel de Oliveira	Portugal, France
Finding Neverland		Marc Forster	United States
How We Got the Italian Movie Business Into Trouble: The True Story of Franco and Ciccio	Come inguaiammo il cinema italiano	Ciprì & Maresco	Italy
An Italian Romance	L'amore ritrovato	Carlo Mazzacurati	Italy
The Manchurian Candidate		Jonathan Demme	United States
The Merchant of Venice		Michael Radford	United Kingdom, Italy
The Remains of Nothing	Il resto di niente	Antonietta De Lillo	Italy
She Hate Me		Spike Lee	United States
Steamboy (closing film)	スチームボーイ	Katsuhiro Otomo	Japan
The Terminal (opening film)		Steven Spielberg	United States
Throw Down	柔道龍虎榜	Johnnie To	Hong Kong
The Tuner	Настройщик	Kira Muratova	Russia, Ukraine
Special Event
Shark Tale		Victoria Jenson and Bibo Bergeron	United States

=== Orizzonti ===
The following films were selected for the Horizons (Orizzonti) section:

English title	Original title	Director(s)	Production country
In Competition
The 3 Rooms of Melancholia	Melancholian 3 huonetta	Pirjo Honkasalo	Finland, Sweden, Denmark
Agnes and His Brothers	Agnes und seine Brüder	Oskar Roehler	Germany
Ambasadori, cautam patrie		Mircea Daneliuc	Romania
Criminal †		Gregory Jacobs	United States
Gilles' Wife	La femme de Gilles	Frédéric Fonteyne	Belgium, France, Luxembourg
The Grand Sons	Les petits fils	Ilan Duran Cohen	France
I Can See It in Your Eyes †	Te lo leggo negli occhi	Valia Santella	Italy
Izo		Takashi Miike	Japan
A Less Bad World	Un mundo menos peor	Alejandro Agresti	Argentina
A Love Song for Bobby Long †		Shainee Gabel	United States
Mysterious Skin		Gregg Araki	United States, Netherlands
Rolling Family	Familia rodante	Pablo Trapero	Argentina, Spain
Saimir †		Francesco Munzi	Italy
The Sleeping Child †	L'enfant endormi	Yasmine Kassari	Morocco, Belgium
Stryker		Noam Gonick	Canada
They Came Back †	Les revenants	Robin Campillo	France
Vento di terra		Vincenzo Marra	Italy
Vital	ヴィタール	Shinya Tsukamoto	Japan
Yesterday		Darrell Roodt	South Africa
Zulu Love Letter	Lettre d'amour zoulou	Ramadan Suleman	South Africa, France, Germany
Special Events
L’ami y’a bon		Rachid Bouchareb	France, Algeria, Germany
Come Back, Africa (1959)		Lionel Rogosin	United States
The Hamburg Cell		Antonia Bird	United Kingdom
Heimat 3: A Chronicle of Endings and Beginning (6 episodes)	Heimat 3 - Chronik einer Zeitenwende	Edgar Reitz	Germany
Música cubana		German Kral	Germany
Tell Them Who You Are		Mark S. Wexler	United States
Tide Table		William Kentridge	South Africa

† indicates films that competed for the Lion of the Future.

=== Short Films Competition (Corto Cortissimo) ===
The following films were selected for the Short Films Competition (Corto Cortissimo):

Title	Director(s	Production country
In competition
A occhi aperti	Lorenza Indovina	Italy
Agna niata	Ektoras Lyghizos	Greece
Aïsha	Newton I. Aduaka	Nigeria, Senegal
The Arsonist	Myles Sorensen	United States
The Carpenter and his Clumsy Wife	Peter Foott	Ireland
Chamaco	Tim Parsa	Mexico
Close	Tom Hopkins	Ireland
La culpa del alpinista	Daniel Sánchez Arévalo	Spain
Dim	Ann-Kristin Wecker	Germany
Il dio della pioggia	Angelo Amoroso D'Aragona	Italy
Goodbye	Steve Hudson	Germany
Határontúl	Árpád Schilling	Hungary
Last Night	Sean Mewshaw	United States
Moustache	Vicki Sugars	Australia
Passatempo	Francesco Lagi	Italy
A piscina	Iana Joao Viana	Portugal
Rain Is Falling	Holger Ernst	Germany, Morocco
Resurrection	Mitchell Lichtenstein	United States
Shengri	Bertrand Lee	Singapore
Signe d'appartenance	Kamel Cherif	Belgium, Tunisia
Silent Companion	Elham Hosseinzade	Iran
Sous le bleu	David Oelhoffen	France
Srce je kos Mesa (aka The Heart Is a Piece of Meat)	Jan Cvitkovic	Slovenia
Streets	Jon Howe	United Kingdom
Trofast	Trond Fausa Aurvaag	Norway
White on Blue	Ramunas Greicius	Lithuania
Out of Competition
Coleridge's Couch	Angeles Woo	United States
Special Events 1 - Centro Sperimentale di Cinematografia: Scuola Nazionale di Cinema
Il potere sottile	Diego Ronsisvalle	Italy
Special Events - Ipotesi Cinema: Bologna
Postazioni della memoria	Ermanno Olmi and the students of Ipotesi Cinema	Italy
Special Events 2 - Centro Sperimentale di Cinematografia: Scuola Nazionale di Cinema
I gabbiani - studio su "Il gabbiano" di Anton Cecov	Francesca Archibugi	Italy
Special Events 3 - Corto d'autore: Italia
Too Short for Sky	Pappi Corsicato	Italy
Body & Soul	Theo Eshetu	Italy
Corpo/Immagine	Marco Puccioni	Italy

=== Venetian Nights ===
The following films were screened for the Venetian Nights section (Venezia Mezzanotte):

English title	Original title	Director(s)	Production country
The Art of Losing	Perder es cuestión de método	Sergio Cabrera	Colombia, Spain
Enduring Love		Roger Michell	United Kingdom
Eyes of Crystal	Occhi di cristallo	Eros Puglielli	Italy
A Home at the End of the World †		Michael Mayer	United States
Howrah Bridge / The Youth of the Land	Yuva	Mani Ratnam	India
Man on Fire		Tony Scott	United States
Puteri Gunung Ledang		Saw Teong Hin	Malaysia
Three... Extremes	三更2 / 쓰리, 몬스터 / 美しい夜、残酷な朝	Park Chan-Wook, Takashi Miike and Fruit Chan	Hong Kong, South Korea, Japan
To Sleep Next To Her †	Volevo solo dormirle addosso	Eugenio Cappuccio	Italy
Titanus's one hundredth year
The Demon	Il demonio (1963)	Brunello Rondi	Italy

† indicates films that competed for the Lion of the Future.

=== Venice Digital Cinema ===
A section intended to provide an overview of the new expressive possibilities granted by digital technologies.

English title	Original title	Director(s)	Production country
20 Fingers †	20 angosht	Mania Akbari	Iran, United Kingdom
Impermanence		Goutam Ghose	India
The Tulse Luper Suitcases, Part 3: From Sark to the Finish		Peter Greenaway	United Kingdom, Italy, Spain, Hungary, Netherlands, Luxembourg
Cuoco contadino		Luca Guadagnino	Italy
Homecoming		Jon Jost	United States
Letters to Ali		Clara Law	Australia
La vita è breve ma la giornata è lunghissima		Lucio Pellegrini, Gianni Zanasi	Italy
Pin Boy	Parapalos	Ana Poliak	Argentina
Un silenzio particolare		Stefano Rulli	Italy
Marebito	稀人	Takashi Shimizu	Japan
Special Events
L'ora della lucertola		Mimmo Calopresti	Italy
Bellissime		Giovanna Gagliardo	Italy
Killer Shrimps †		Piero Golia	Switzerland
The Take		Avi Lewis	Canada
Final Fantasy VII: Advent Children	ファイナルファンタジーVII アドベントチルドレン,	Tetsuya Nomura	Japan
Embedded		Tim Robbins	United States
Colpi di Luce		Matteo Spinola, Stefano Della Casa, Francesca Calvelli	Italy
Digital Africa
Yizo Yizo		Angus Gibson, Andrew Dosunmu, Teboho Mahlatsi	South Africa

† indicates films that competed for the Lion of the Future.

=== Retrospective - The Secret History of Italian Cinema 1 ===
A new retrospective section on Italian Cinema aiming to restore and systematically rediscover sides of the Italian cinema That Have Been "Forgotten, Invisible, Unknown Or Misunderstood". This first edition of the retrospective is titled Italian Kings of the B's.

English title	Original title	Director(s)	Production country
Italian Kings of the B's
100 Horsemen (1961)	I cento cavalieri	Vittorio Cottafavi	Italy, Spain, West Germany
The Beyond (1981)	...E tu vivrai nel terrore! L'aldilà	Lucio Fulci	Italy
The Big Gundown (1966)	La resa dei conti	Sergio Sollima	Italy, Spain
Blindman (1972)	Il pistolero cieco	Ferdinando Baldi	Italy, United States
The Boss (1973)	Il Boss	Fernando Di Leo	Italy
A Bullet for the General (1967)	Quien sabe?	Damiano Damiani	Italy
Caliber 9 (1972)	Milano calibro 9	Fernando Di Leo	Italy
Cannibal Holocaust (1979)		Ruggero Deodato	Italy
Castle of Blood (1964)	Danza macabra	Antonio Margheriti	Italy, France
Coup D'État (1969)	Colpo di stato	Luciano Salce	Italy
Don't Torture a Duckling (1972)	Non si sevizia un paperino	Lucio Fulci	Italy
The Dynamite Brothers (1949)	I fratelli Dinamite	Nino and Toni Pagot	Italy
The God Snake (1970)	Il dio serpente	Piero Vivarelli	Italy, Venezuela
Goliath and the Dragon (1960)	La vendetta di Ercole	Vittorio Cottafavi	Italy, France
Col cuore in gola (1967)		Tinto Brass	Italy, France
The Inglorious Bastards (1977)	Quel maledetto treno blindato	Enzo G. Castellari	Italy
The Italian Connection (1972)	La mala ordina	Fernando Di Leo	Italy, West Germany
Mister Scarface (1976)	I padroni della citta	Fernando Di Leo	Italy, West Germany
Naked Violence (1969)	I ragazzi del massacro	Fernando Di Leo	Italy
Orgasm (1969)	Orgasmo	Umberto Lenzi	Italy, France
The Strange Vice of Mrs. Wardh (1970)	Lo strano vizio della Signora Wardh	Sergio Martino	Italy, Spain, Austria
The Syndicate: A Death in the Family (1969)	Colpo rovente	Piero Zuffi	Italy
Tragic Ceremony (1972)	Estratto dagli archivi segreti della polizia di una capitale europea	Riccardo Freda	Italy, Spain
The Trojan Horse (1961)	La guerra di Troia	Giorgio Ferroni	Italy, France, Yugoslavia
W la foca (1982)		Nando Cicero	Italy
Underground Italia - Shards of utopia
La verifica incerta (1964)		Gianfranco Baruchello, Alberto Grifi	Italy
Transfert per kamera verso Virulentia (1975)		Alberto Grifi	Italy
The Blind Fly (1966)	A mosca cieca	Romano Scavolini	Italy
Portrait of Gianfranco Barucchello	Ritratto di Gianfranco Barucchello	Paolo Brunatto	Italy
Portrait of Alberto Grifi	Ritratto di Alberto Grifi	Paolo Brunatto	Italy
Portrait of Romano Scovolini	Ritratto di Romano Scovolini	Paolo Brunatto	Italy

== Independent Sections ==
=== Venice International Film Critics' Week ===
The following feature films were selected to be screened as In Competition for this section:

English title	Original title	Director(s)	Production country
In Competition
From Land of Silence	Sakenine Sarzamine Sokoot	Saman Salur	Iran
The Great Journey	Le Grand Voyage	Ismaël Ferroukhi	France
Les liens		Aymeric Mesa-Juan	France
One or the Other	Una de dos	Alejo Hernán Taube	Argentina
Otakus in Love	恋の門	Suzuki Matsuo	Japan
To Take a Wife	Ve Lakachta Lecha Isha	Ronit Elkabetz, Shlomi Elkabetz	Israel, France
Uninhibited	Kuang Fang	Leste Chen	Taiwan
Out of Competition
P.S. (opening film)		Dylan Kidd	United States
Butterfly	蝴蝶	Yan Yan Mak	China
The Love (Part One)	El Amor (Primera Parte)	Alejandro Fadel, Martin Mauregui, Santiago Mitre, Juan Schnitman	Argentina

=== Venice Days ===
The following films were selected for the 1st edition of Venice Days (Giornate Degli Autori) autonomous section:

English title	Original title	Director(s)	Production country
4		Ilya Khrzhanovsky	Russia, Netherlands
Caro Vittorio		Marco Risi	Italy
Changing Destiny	Nemmeno il destino	Daniele Gaglianone	Italy
Darwin's Nightmare		Hubert Sauper	Austria, Belgium, France, Germany
Dead Man's Shoes		Shane Meadows	United Kingdom
Il giorno del falco		Rodolfo Bisatti	Italy
L'imperatore di Roma		Nico D'Alessandria	Italy
In Kurdistan e' difficile		Giuliana Gamba	Italy
Morasseix		Damien Odoul	France
The Murmuring Coast	A costa dos murmúrios	Margarida Cardoso	Portugal
Now and Then	L'oeil de l'autre	John Lvoff	France
Strings		Anders Rønnow Klarlund	Denmark, Sweden, Norway, United Kingdom
Suburbs	Predmestje	Vinko Möderndorfer	Slovenia
Sweet Jam	Confituur	Lieven Debrauwer	Belgium, Switzerland
Tartarughe sul dorso		Stefano Pasetto	Italy

== Official Awards ==
=== In Competition (Venezia 61) ===
- Golden Lion: Vera Drake by Mike Leigh
- Silver Lion for Best Director: 3-Iron by Kim Ki-duk
- Grand Jury Prize: The Sea Inside by Alejandro Amenábar
- Volpi Cup for Best Actor: Javier Bardem for The Sea Inside
- Volpi Cup for Best Actress: Imelda Staunton for Vera Drake
- Marcello Mastroianni Award: Tommaso Ramenghi and Marco Luisi for Working Slowly (Radio Alice)
- Golden Osella: Studio Ghibli for Howl's Moving Castle

=== Golden Lion for lifetime achievement ===
- Manoel de Oliveira and Stanley Donen

=== Orizzonti ===
- Best Film: The Grand Sons by Ilan Duran Cohen
  - Special mention: Vento di terra by Vincenzo Marra

=== Digital Cinema Award ===
- 20 Fingers by Mania Akbari
  - Special Mention: La vita è breve ma la giornata è lunghissima by Gianni Zanasi and Lucio Pellegrini

=== Short Film Competition (Corto Cortissimo) ===
- Citroen Short Super-Short Lion for Best Short Film: Signe d'appartenence by Kamel Cherif
  - Special mention: The Carpenter and His Clumsy Wife by Peter Foot
- UIP Prize for Best European Short Film: Goodbye by Steve Hudson

=== "Luigi de Laurentiis" Award For A Debut Film (Lion of the Future) ===
- The Great Journey by Ismaël Ferroukhi and Humbert Balsan
  - Special Mention: Saimir by Francesco Munzi

== Independents Awards ==
The following collateral awards were conferred to films of the official selection:

=== Venice International Film Critics' Week ===
- Audience Award:To Take a Wife by Ronit Elkabetz and Shlomi Elkabetz

=== FIPRESCI Prize ===
- Competition: 3-Iron by Kim Ki-duk
- Parallel Sections: Vento di terra by Vincenzo Marra

=== SIGNS Award ===
- One Long Winter Without Fire by Greg Zglinski
- Honorable Mention: 3-Iron by Kim Ki-duk

=== C.I.C.A.E. Award ===
- Gilles' Wife by Frédéric Fonteyne

=== UNICEF Award ===
- House of Fools by Andrei Konchalovsky

=== UNESCO Award ===
- Land of Plenty by Wim Wenders

=== Pasinetti Award ===
- Best Film: The Keys to the House by Gianni Amelio
- Best Actor: Kim Rossi Stuart for The Keys to the House
- Best Actress: Valeria Bruni Tedeschi for 5x2

=== Isvema Award ===
- To Take a Wife by Ronit Elkabetz and Shlomi Elkabetz

=== FEDIC Award ===
- To Sleep Next To Her by Eugenio Cappuccio

=== Little Golden Lion ===
- 3-Iron by Kim Ki-duk

=== Venice Days - Label Europa Cinemas ===
- Darwin's Nightmare by Hubert Sauper

=== Young Cinema Award ===
- Best Italian Film: Nemmeno il destino by Daniele Gaglianone
- Best Digital Film: Un silenzio particolare by Stefano Rulli
- Best International Film: The Sea Inside by Alejandro Amenábar

=== "Lino Miccichè" First Feature Award ===
- Nemmeno il destino by Daniele Gaglianone

=== Open Prize ===
- Strays Dogs by Marzieh Makhmalbaf

=== Lina Mangiacapre Award ===
- The 3 Rooms of Melancholia by Pirjo Honkasalo

=== Future Film Festival Digital Award ===
- Collateral by Michael Mann

=== Laterna Magica Prize ===
- Finding Neverland by Marc Forster

=== Sergio Trasatti Award ===
- The Keys to the House by Gianni Amelio

=== CinemAvvenire Award ===
- Best Film: The Keys to the House by Gianni Amelio
- Best First Film: One Long Winter Without Fire by Greg Zglinski
- Cinema for Peace Award: Promised Land by Amos Gitai

=== Award of the City of Rome ===
- Best Film: A Less Bad World by Alejandro Agresti

=== International Peace Award ===
- Best Film: Jeruzalemski sindrom by Jakov Sedlar

=== Human Rights Film Network Award ===
- The 3 Rooms of Melancholia by Pirjo Honkasalo

=== EIUC Award ===
- Yesterday by Darrell Roodt
  - Special Mention: The 3 Rooms of Melancholia by Pirjo Honkasalo

=== Special Director's Award ===
- 3-Iron by Kim Ki-duk

=== Special Pasinetti Award ===
- Vento di terra by Vincenzo Marra (For an innovative film)
