= Sleeping Child =

A sleeping child, according to a folk belief of the Maghreb region, is a fetus that has been rendered dormant by magic.

Sleeping Child may refer to:

- The Sleeping Child, a 2004 Belge-Moroccan film directed by Yasmine Kassari
- Sleeping Child (album), a 1994 album by Debra Byrne
- "Sleeping Child" (Michael Learns to Rock song), a song on Michael Learns to Rock's 1993 album Colours
- "Sleeping Child" (Bonnie Pink song), a song on Bonnie Pink's 2000 album Let Go
