= ADFM =

ADFM may refer to:

- Medium Auxiliary Floating Dry Docks
- The Democratic Association of Moroccan Women
