= Amal Women's Training Center and Moroccan Restaurant =

- جمعية الامل لفنون الطبخ (Arabic); Association Amal pour les Arts culinaires en faveur des femmes nécessiteuses (French)
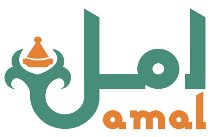
- Logo of Amal Women's Training Center and Moroccan Restaurant
- Formation: November 2012; 13 years ago
- Founder: Nora Belahcen Fitzgerald
- Type: NGO
- Legal status: Non-profit association
- Purpose: Humanitarian
- Location: Marrakesh, Morocco
- Coordinates: 31.63895°N 8.01376°W
- Official languages: Arabic, English, French
- Director: Moulay Hassan Aladlouni
- Staff: 15 (2015)
- Volunteers: 15–18 (2015)
- Website: amalnonprofit.org

Amal Women's Training Center and Moroccan Restaurant (Arabic: جمعية الامل لفنون الطبخ; French: Association Amal pour les Arts culinaires en faveur des femmes nécessiteuses) is a non-profit organization in Marrakesh, Morocco, that helps disadvantaged women gain work experience by training them in the preparation of Moroccan food and international food. The center was established in 2012 by Nora Belahcen Fitzgerald. Each year between 30 and 40 women complete four to six months of training, which often leads to them finding employment in a relevant field.

== History ==
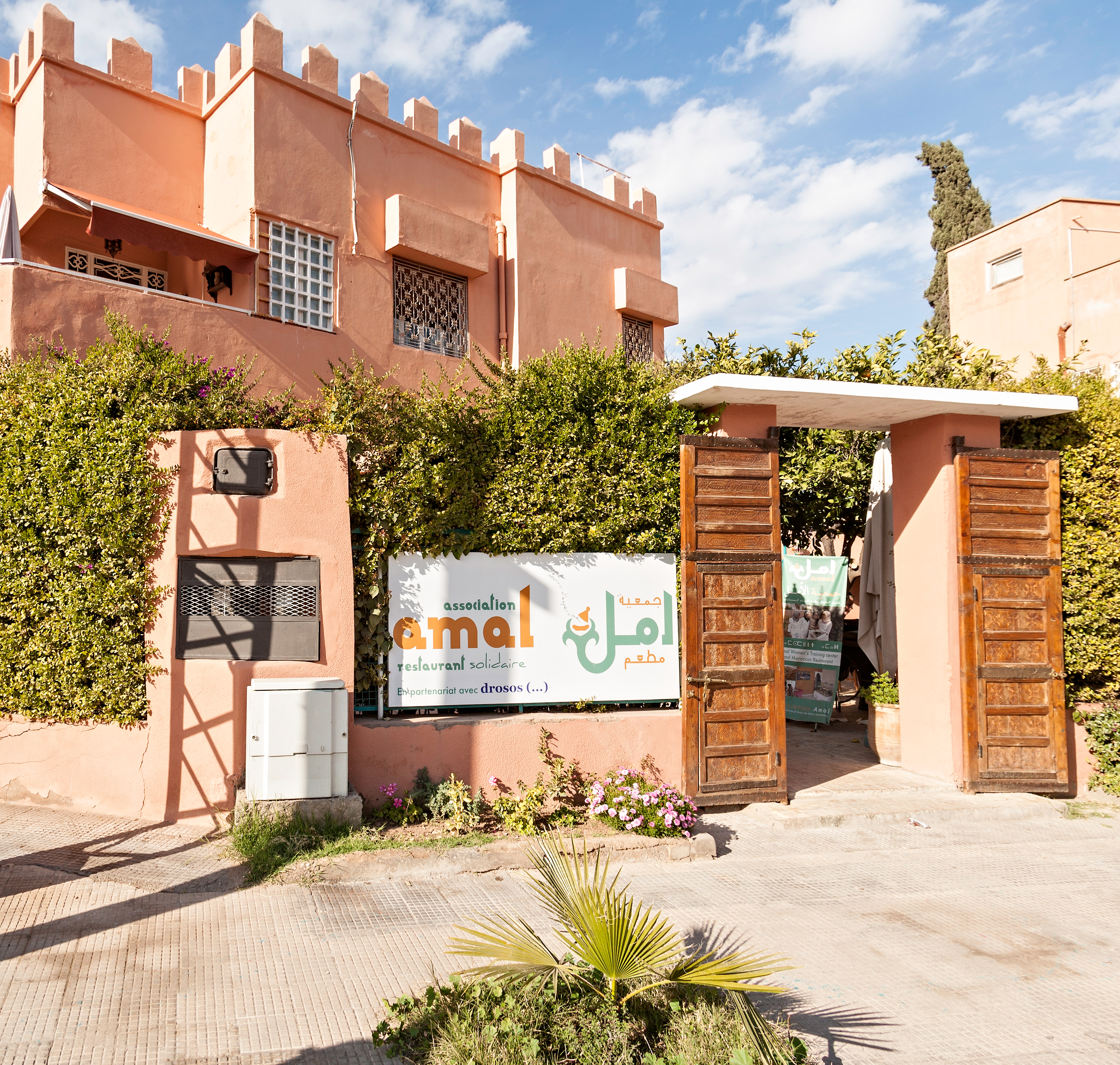
Entrance to Amal Women's Training Center and Moroccan Restaurant

Nora Belahcen Fitzgerald first conceived the idea of creating an organization to help Morocco's underprivileged women through career training in 2006 after meeting a single mother begging on the street who lived on 20–30 dirhams per day (about €2.70, $3.40 in 2006). Belahcen Fitzgerald was inspired by the Association Solidarité Féminine, which helps single mothers overcome poverty and social stigma by providing them with shelter, counselling, and vocational training. She decided to begin helping women by teaching them to make baked goods in her family's language center. This proved to be successful, and the participants were able to make more money using their new skills than by begging. In 2008, Belahcen Fitzgerald began hiring underprivileged Moroccan women to cook for events she organized for her friends.

In 2012 Belahcen Fitzgerald found a property to rent and registered Amal Women's Training Center and Moroccan Restaurant as a non-profit organization. In early 2013 the center raised more than $7300 through crowdfunding on RocketHub, exceeding its $5000 goal. The money was used to purchase kitchen equipment and to ensure the kitchen was up to code. The restaurant opened in April 2013, and in July 2013, the center was awarded a three-year grant by the Drosos Foundation with the goal of making the program self-sustaining by 2016. The first group of trainees began training in February 2014. Within the first month of operation, several of the restaurant's customers had expressed interest in hiring future Amal graduates to work at local hotels and restaurants. The center completed a second round of crowdfunding on RocketHub in 2014, raising more than $9600. In October 2015 the center was awarded €25,000 by the Orange Foundation. Belahcen Fitzgerald stated that the prize money would be used to help women start their own catering micro businesses.

== Restaurant ==
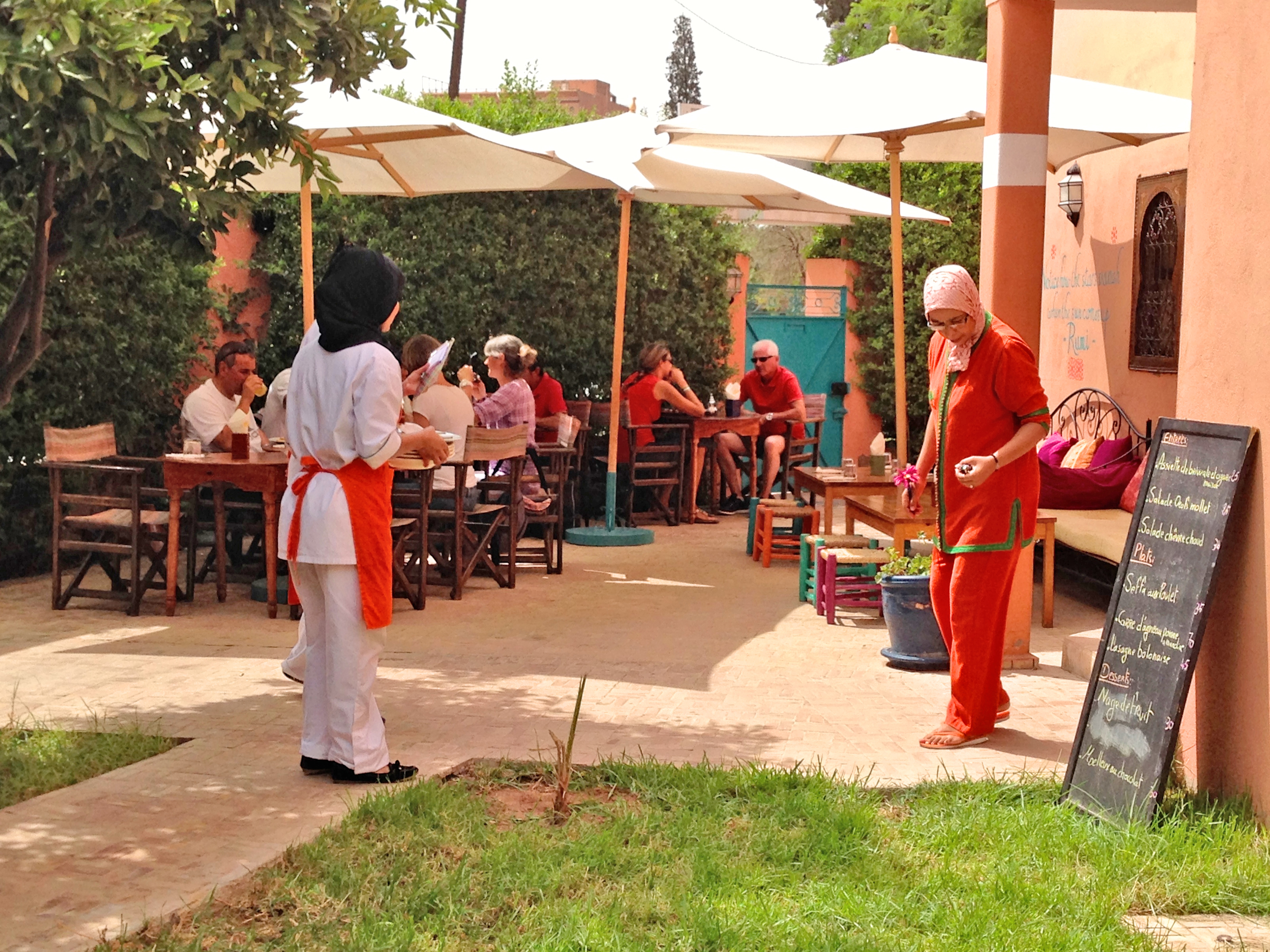
Outdoor seating on the restaurant's terrace

The restaurant's menu changes daily and includes traditional Moroccan dishes as well as international selections. The restaurant is open for lunch daily from 12:00 to 16:00, and for dinner by reservation for groups of 20 or more. A playroom and nursery, staffed by an American preschool teacher, is available for the children of staff and customers. Moroccan cuisine cooking classes for the public are available in Arabic, English, and French. As of August 2018 the restaurant averages 100 customers per day.

== Trainees ==
The center's trainees are generally divorced mothers, widows, orphans, or former child maids, aged 18–35, who have little or no formal education. Participants are selected through partnerships with other non-profits or by the center's social worker, based on the criteria that they are economically disadvantaged and are motivated to train to achieve financial independence. Around 15–20 women are chosen twice a year to complete four to six months of training. After graduating from the training center, they are provided support to find relevant employment. As of June 2015 80% of Amal graduates have found employment in a relevant field. Over 200 women have been trained at the organization as of August 2018.

== Staff and volunteers ==
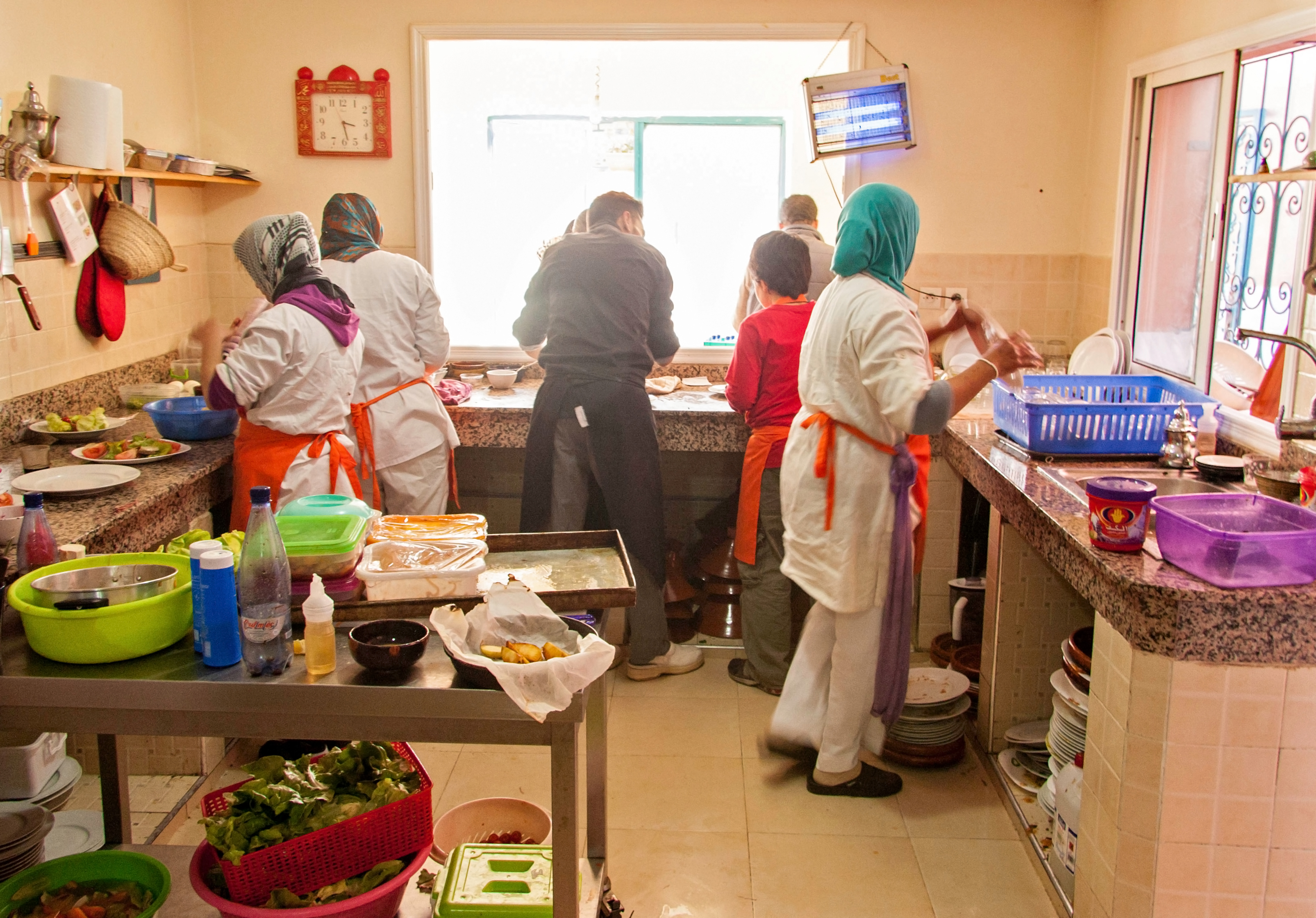
Trainees and volunteers preparing lunch with the culinary teacher in the center's kitchen

As of March 2018 the center has 25 full-time employees, including program staff and culinary teachers.

As of 2015 the center has 12 full-time volunteers: an Arabic teacher, two English teachers, two French teachers, a translator, a life coach, two hygiene teachers, a psychologist, and two teachers who help the trainees develop conflict-resolution and communication skills. There are also several part-time volunteers, who help in various capacities as needed. The center also employs a social worker with a PhD in clinical psychology, who provides counselling.

Belahcen Fitzgerald is the president of the organization. The managing director is Moulay Hassan Aladlouni.

== Operation ==
Program participants receive job training, are trained in culinary arts and attend arts and crafts classes. They are provided with two meals a day, a transportation stipend, life-skills coaching, individual and group therapy, and a bonus upon successful completion of the program. Language classes are offered in Arabic literacy (because many of the trainees are illiterate), English, and French. In partnership with Search for Common Ground, the center educates the trainees on subjects such as life planning, empowerment, Nonviolent Communication, and reproductive health. Center staff help participants find employment with outside businesses upon graduation.

About 45% of the training center's revenue comes from restaurant sales, 5% from private donations, and the remaining 50% from the Drosos Foundation. All profits are reinvested into the training program.

Belahcen Fitzgerald has stated the desire to train additional women by opening a separate catering service that would make lunches for school children.

== See also ==
- Feminization of poverty in Morocco
- Women in Morocco
- Association Marocaine des Droits Humains
- List of women's organizations
