= Abdesslam Yassine =

Moroccan politician (1928–2012)

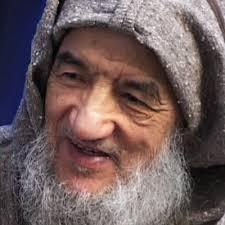
Abdesslam Yassine

Abdesslam Yassine (Arabic: عبد السلام ياسين, romanized: ʿAbd al-Salām Yāsīn; 1928 – December 13, 2012) was the leader of the Moroccan Islamist organisation Al Adl Wa Al Ihssane (Justice and Spirituality).

== Biography ==
Abdesslam Yassine was born in Marrakesh on 3 September 1928. He worked as a teacher and a school inspector for the Ministry of Education, and from 1965 on, was a member of one of the most famous Moroccan Sufi brotherhoods, the Budshishiyya. Yassine reportedly fell out with the leadership of the brotherhood over its refusal to engage more directly in political matters, and founded his own organisation.

Yassine was jailed in a mental asylum for three years for publishing an open letter to King Hassan II denouncing his rule as un-Islamic. Following his release he was kept under house arrest for many years, before eventually being released in the early years of the rule of King Mohammed VI.

Yassine's many publications include L'Islam ou le Deluge (Islam or the Flood), probably the best known of his works.

Yassine died on 13 December 2012. He was married to Khadija Al Malki who died in late March 2015 and is the father of Nadia Yassine who leads the women's branch of Al Adl Wa Al Ihssane.

== Books ==
=== Originally written in Arabic ===
1. Islam between the Appeal and the State, 1972
2. Tomorrow Islam!, 1973
3. Islam—or the Flood (An Open Letter to the Late King of Morocco), 1974
4. The Royal Century Missive in the Balance of Islam, 1980
5. The Prophetic Method [al-Minhāj an-Nabawi], 1982
6. Islam and the Challenge of Marxism-Leninism, 1987
7. Exemplary Men (1st in the series Al-Ihssān), 1988
8. Introductions to the Method, 1989
9. Islam and the Challenge of Secular Nationalism, 1989
10. Reflections on Islamic Jurisprudence and History, 1990
11. Spiritual Gems (A Collection of Poems), 1992
12. The Muslim Mind on Trial: Divine Revelation versus Secular Rationalism, 1994
13. A Dialogue with Honorable Democrats, 1994
14. Letter of Reminder (1st in the series Rasa’il Al-Ihsān), 1995
15. On the Economy, 1995
16. Letter to Students and to all Muslims (2nd in the series Rassa’il Al-Ihssân), 1995
17. Guide to Believing Women, 1996
18. Shūra and Democracy, 1996
19. Poetic Exhortations (3rd in the series Rasa’il Al- Ihsān), 1996
20. Dialogue of the Past and the Future, 1997
21. Dialogue with an Amazighit Friend, 1997
22. Spirituality [Al-Ihssān] V1, 1998
23. How Shall We Renew Our Iman? How Do We Advise For God’s Sake And His Messenger? (1st in the series “The Prophetic Method Discourses”), 1998
24. Al-Fitra And The Remedial Treatment Of Prophecy For Hearts (2nd in the series “The Prophetic Method Discourses”), 1998
25. Spirituality [Al-Ihssān] V2, 1999
26. Hearts Sincerity (3rd in the series “The Prophetic Method Discourses”), 1999
27. Braving the Obstacles (4th in the series “The Prophetic Method Discourses”), 1999
28. Justice: Islamists and Governance, 2000
29. Bunches of Grapes (A Collection of Poems), 2000
30. The Scholarly Treatise, 2001
31. Caliphate and Monarchy, 2001
32. Exemplary Men of Uprising and Reform, 2001
33. Day and Night Schedule of the Believer, 2002
34. The Price (5th in the series “The Prophetic Method Discourses”), 2004
35. God’s Custom, 2005
36. Introductions to the future of Islam, 2005
37. Day and Night Schedule of the Believer (a book in Arabic and English), 2007
38. Leadership of the Umma, 2009
39. Qur’ān and Prophecy, 2010
40. The Muslim Community and its Bond, 2012

=== Originally written in French ===
1. The Islamic Method of Revolution, 1980
2. Toward a Dialog with our Westernized Elite, 1980
3. Winning the Modern World for Islam, 1998
4. Memorandum: To Him Who Is Concerned (an open letter in French to the country's new king, Mohamed VI), 1999

=== Translated into English ===
- Memorandum: To Him Who Is Concerned (Translation of an open letter in French to the country’s new king, Mohamed VI), 1999
- Winning the Modern World for Islam, 2000
- The MuslimMind on Trial: Divine Revelation versus SecularRationalism, 2003
- Day and Night Schedule of the Believer (A book in Arabic and English), 2007
- The Last Testament of Imam Abdessalam Yassine 2013
