= Bouchra Abdou =

Moroccan feminist

- بُشْرَى عَبْدُو
- Occupations: Activist; Women's rights activist; Human rights defender
- Years active: 2002–present
- Organization: Tahadi Association for Equality and Citizenship
- Known for: Advocacy for women's rights and victims of domestic violence
- Title: President

Bouchra Abdou (in Arabic: بُشْرَى عَبْدُو, romanized: Bušraỳ ʿabdū) is a Moroccan activist and human rights defender. As the president of the Tahadi Association for Equality and Citizenship (ATEC), she advocates for Moroccan women, especially victims of domestic violence. She is also interested in digital issues and seeks to improve the condition of women in Morocco through legal advancements.

== Biography ==
Bouchra Abdou is a founding member of the Democratic League for Women's Rights (LDDF). Initially the secretary of the Casablanca branch in 2002, she later became one of its main organizers. In this role, she has been involved since the early 2000s in helping Moroccan women to embrace the Internet, which she sees as a means of empowerment for them. She is particularly committed to protecting women who do not wish to wear the hijab and who face discrimination.

She then presided over the Tahadi Association for Equality and Citizenship (ATEC), which organizes two centers dedicated to the protection of women: one to shelter and assist victims of domestic violence, and the other to support women in difficult situations. She remains interested in digital issues and addresses topics such as digital violence.

Abdou particularly focuses on legal means to improve the condition of women in Morocco, such as supporting and advocating for legislative reforms of the Mudawana, the Moroccan family code. In 2024, she welcomed the circulaire allowing mothers to apply for their children's passports without necessarily needing the father's approval.
