= Lemrini =

Lemrini is a surname. Notable people with the surname include:

- Amina Lemrini, Moroccan human rights activist
- Youssef Lemrini (born 1960), Moroccan footballer and manager
