= Chenna =

Chenna may refer to:

- Chhena, cheese curds on the Indian subcontinent
- Aïcha Chenna (1941–2022), Moroccan social worker, women's rights advocate and activist
- Chenna massacre, civilians killed during the Tigray War in Ethiopia in 2021
