= Association Solidarité Féminine =

Moroccan non-profit organization

- Women's Solidarity Association (WSA)
- Abbreviation: ASF
- Formation: 1985; 41 years ago
- Founder: Aïcha Chenna
- Type: NGO
- Legal status: Non-profit association
- Location: Casablanca, Morocco
- Coordinates: 33.58006°N 7.62697°W
- Official languages: Arabic, French
- Website: facebook.com/solfem

Association Solidarité Féminine (ASF) is a non-profit organization founded by rights activist Aïcha Chenna in Casablanca, Morocco in 1985. The association helps single mothers gain work experience by training them at the association's restaurant, patisserie, and hammam.

== History ==
In 1985, ASF was created in Casablanca, Morocco.

In 1988, the association's first center opened its doors in Tizi Ouasli. Ech-Chenna was awarded the Medal of Honor by King Mohammed VI in 2000, followed by the Elisabeth Norgall Prize in 2005, the Opus Prize, and the Dona d'el Ano award in 2009. · .

In 2013, Ech-Chenna was also honored with the Legion of Honour, being named a Knight of the French Republic.

Her association is also a member of Oyoune Nissaiya, the Moroccan Observatory on violence against women.

== See also ==
- Amal Women's Training Center and Moroccan Restaurant
- Feminization of poverty in Morocco
- Women in Morocco
- List of women's organizations
