= The Grand Sons =

2004 French film

- Directed by: Ilan Duran Cohen
- Written by: Ilan Duran Cohen
- Starring: Reine Ferrato
- Cinematography: Ilan Duran Cohen
- Edited by: Fabrice Rouaud
- Music by: Bertrand Bonello
- Release date: 2004
- Country: France
- Language: French

The Grand Sons (French: Les Petits-Fils) is a 2004 French comedy-drama film written and directed by Ilan Duran Cohen.

The film won the Horizons competition at the 61st edition of the Venice Film Festival.

== Cast ==
- Reine Ferrato as Mamie Régine
- Guillaume Quatravaux as Guillaume
- Jean-Philippe Sêt as Maxime
- Brice Cauvin as Serge
- Samuel de Gunzburg as Ben
- Ilan Duran Cohen as Ben's father
