= One Long Winter Without Fire =

2004 film

- Directed by: Greg Zgliński
- Written by: Pierre-Pascal Rossi
- Produced by: Gérard Ruey; Jean-Louis Porchet
- Starring: Aurélien Recoing
- Cinematography: Witold Plociennik
- Edited by: Urszula Lesiak
- Music by: Jacek Grudzien; Mariusz Ziemba
- Release date: September 2004
- Running time: 91 minutes
- Countries: Switzerland; Poland
- Language: French

One Long Winter Without Fire (French: Tout un hiver sans feu) is a 2004 Swiss-Polish drama film directed by Greg Zgliński and written by Pierre-Pascal Rossi. Set in the Swiss Jura, it won awards including two at the 2004 Venice Film Festival and the 2005 Swiss Film Award for Best Fiction Film. It was also selected as Switzerland’s submission for the 78th Academy Awards in the Best Foreign Language Film category.

== Synopsis ==
Jean and Laure, who live in the Swiss Jura, are grieving after their daughter dies in a barn fire. After Laure enters a clinic, Jean takes a job at a foundry, where he meets Labinota, a Kosovar asylum seeker whose husband disappeared during the Serbian offensive. As Jean slowly begins to recover, Labinota learns that her husband has been identified in a mass grave in Kosovo, while Laure, after processing her grief, seeks Jean’s company again.

== Cast ==
The cast includes:

- Aurélien Recoing as Jean
- Marie Matheron as Laure
- Gabriela Muskala as Labinota
- Blerim Gjoci as Kastriot
- Nathalie Boulin as Valérie

== Reception ==
=== Awards and nominations ===
The film's awards included the Grand Prix SIGNIS and the CinemAvvenire Award for Best Feature Film at the 2004 Venice Film Festival. In 2005, it won the Swiss Film Award for Best Fiction Film at Solothurn and the Prix du public de la Ville de Namur at the Festival international du film francophone de Namur.

The film was selected as Switzerland’s submission for the 78th Academy Awards in the Best Foreign Language Film category, but it was not nominated.

=== Critical response ===
Filmdienst called the film austere and moving, and wrote that it tells its story with restraint while conveying both the suffering and hope of its protagonists. Variety called the film a “promising if cautious feature debut”, praised Aurélien Recoing’s performance, and described Witold Płociennik’s cinematography as “aces”.

== Festival screenings ==
The film's festival screenings included the 61st Venice International Film Festival in 2004, followed by the 58th Locarno Film Festival, the 40th Karlovy Vary International Film Festival, the 49th San Francisco International Film Festival, and the Edinburgh International Film Festival in 2005.

== Legacy ==
In a 2025 article on films about the Jura, Swissinfo wrote that One Long Winter Without Fire called into question the possibility of making a living in the Jura Mountains, given their freezing winters and precarious economic prospects.

== See also ==
- List of submissions to the 78th Academy Awards for Best Foreign Language Film
- List of Swiss submissions for the Academy Award for Best Foreign Language Film
