= To Sleep Next To Her =

- Directed by: Eugenio Cappuccio
- Written by: Massimo Lolli; Alessandro Spinaci
- Starring: Giorgio Pasotti; Cristiana Capotondi
- Cinematography: Gianfilippo Corticelli
- Edited by: Marco Spoletini
- Music by: Francesco Cerasi
- Release date: 2004
- Country: Italy
- Language: Italian

To Sleep Next To Her (Italian: Volevo solo dormirle addosso) is a 2004 Italian drama film directed by Eugenio Cappuccio. It entered the Midnight section at the 61st Venice International Film Festival.

== Cast ==
- Giorgio Pasotti as Marco Pressi
- Cristiana Capotondi as Laura
- Elizabeth Olumoroti Fajuyigbe as Angélique
- Marcello Catalano as Jean-Claude Rondeau
- Massimo Molea as Giorgio Borghi
- Jun Ichikawa as Fabienne Lo
- Giuseppe Gandini as Alberto Spontini
- Mariella Valentini as Anna Mentosti
- Ninni Bruschetta as Syndicalist

== See also ==
- List of Italian films of 2004
