= Drosos Foundation =

Switzerland-based non-profit organization

- Drosos Stiftung
- Logo for the Drosos Foundation
- Formation: 2003
- Type: NGO
- Legal status: Non-profit Charity
- Headquarters: Zurich, Switzerland
- Coordinates: 47.3829°N 8.5424°E
- CEO: Dr. Richard Brogle
- Board of directors: Chairman: Lic. Markus E. Kronauer; Vice-Chairman: Dr. Frank Schnewlin; Members: Dr. Stefan Kraft; Lic. Edith Kreis-Kolb; Dr. Franz von Däniken
- Website: drosos.org

The Drosos Foundation (German: Drosos Stiftung) is a non-profit, charitable organization based in Zurich, Switzerland. It maintains offices in Cairo and Casablanca. It was founded in 2003 with capital from a private endowment and has been fully operational since early 2005. The foundation is committed to fighting poverty, promoting health and nutrition, increasing access to education and creative activities for youth, and supporting climate and environmental protection.

== History ==
The foundation was established as a private initiative by Christa Gelpke-Engelhorn, a great-granddaughter of BASF co-founder Friedrich Engelhorn and co-heir to the German pharmaceutical company Boehringer Mannheim. The Foundation Board consists of Markus E. Kronauer, Edith Kolb, Hans-Rudolf Castell, Toni Stadler and Barbara Grünewald, and is responsible for the foundation's strategic direction and governance.

The delegate of the Foundation Board is Franz von Däniken, who resigned from his position as State Secretary in the Swiss Federal Department of Foreign Affairs in February 2005 to devote himself to setting up the foundation.

The foundation’s office manages operational matters, including the review of project proposals.

== Projects ==
The Drosos Foundation supports and finances projects in Switzerland, Germany, Egypt, Lebanon, Morocco, Iran, Syria, the Palestinian Territories and across the MENA region.

One of its flagship initiatives is Education in Prison, launched in 2007 in six prisons in German-speaking Switzerland with a budget of five million Swiss francs. The programme aims to reintegrate prisoners into society and the workforce. It was extended to French-speaking Switzerland in 2009 and, following a 2010 decision by the Conference of Cantonal Justice and Police Directors (KKJPD), is being expanded to 27 prisons nationwide, covering 155 learning groups, as a permanent part of the Swiss prison system.

In Germany, the foundation is active in various reading promotion projects, including Lesestark! Dresden blättert die Welt auf (Strong readers! Dresden opens up the world) in Dresden, supported with 1.3 million euros and regarded as one of the largest reading initiatives in Germany. It also runs a joint project with the district of Görlitz.

Since 2014, the foundation has supported the Social Impact Lab Leipzig with over one million euros.

== See also ==
- Amal Women's Training Center and Moroccan Restaurant
