= Nadia Yassine =

Head of the women's branch of the Moroccan Islamist movement Al Adl Wa Al Ihssane

- نادية ياسين
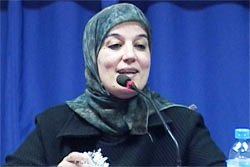
- Born: 1958 (age 67–68); Casablanca
- Movement: Al Adl Wal Ihsane
- Father: Abdesslam Yassine

Nadia Yassine (Arabic: نادية ياسين) (born December 1958) is the head of the women's branch of the Moroccan Islamist movement Al Adl Wa Al Ihssane (Justice and Spirituality). Born in Casablanca, Morocco, she is the daughter of the founder of the same organization Cheikh Abdesslam Yassine.

== Bibliography ==
- Toutes voiles dehors, Le Fennec, 2003 ISBN 978-2-85940-886-2, translated as Full sails ahead by Farouk Bouasse, 2006, ISBN 978-0-9675795-2-8
- Le silence de Shahrazade
