= Sleeping child =

Concept in Maghrebian folk belief

The sleeping child (maghrebi Arabic: ragued or bou-mergoud), according to Moroccan and the wider Maghrebian folk belief, is a fetus which has been rendered dormant by black or white magic and may eventually wake up and be born after the normal pregnancy term. This belief, supported by the concept that God's will controls everything and that no event should be considered truly impossible, is used by local communities to deal with occasional cases of pregnancy in women with absentee husbands, a frequent situation in the modern era due to the large number of males working as immigrant labor in Europe. This folk belief is used to dismiss an accusation of adultery and the consequences that such an accusation would bring.

This belief was acknowledged by traditional Islamic legislation in Morocco, and is still given as an explanation by some divorced or separated women expecting their ex-husbands to acknowledge the paternity of a child born up to twelve months after the separation. Article 154 of the current Mudawana in Moroccan law stipulates that a child born up to one year after the separation is considered as fathered by the ex-husband.

The storyline of L'Enfant endormi (2005), a Belgo-Moroccan movie by Yasmine Kassari, is built around this theme.

== See also ==
- Mudawana, the personal status and family code in Moroccan law
