= Chiens errants =

- Kilab mutasharida
- Directed by: Yasmine Kassari
- Written by: Yasmine Kassari
- Produced by: Jean-Jacques Andrien
- Cinematography: Agnès Dibovsky
- Edited by: Philippe Ravoet
- Production company: Les Films de la Drève
- Release date: 1995
- Running time: 7 minutes
- Country: Belgium
- Language: Moroccan Arabic

Chiens errants (English: Wandering Dogs) is a 1995 short film directed by Yasmine Kassari. It was screened at multiple international film festivals including the London and Sydney film festivals, the Bruxelles International Film Festival, and the International Francophone Film Festival of Namur, where it won a prize for Best Short Film.

== Synopsis ==
The culling of stray dogs is a regular occurrence in certain Moroccan cities. On the dreaded day of the cull, every dog owner keeps their pet at home. The killers are confronted by those without a roof: a shepherdess and a tramp.

== Awards and accolades ==
- 1995 International Francophone Film Festival of Namur (CIRTEF Prize for Best Short Film)
- 1996 Turin Film Festival (Best Short Film)
- 1997 Milan Festival of African Cinema (Special Jury Mention)
