= Quand les hommes pleurent =

1999 documentary film

- Directed by: Yasmine Kassari
- Produced by: Jean-Jacques Andrien
- Cinematography: Dominique Henri
- Edited by: Kahina Attia
- Production companies: Les Films de la Drève; CBA (Centre de l’Audiovisuel à Bruxelles); RTBF (Radio Télévision Belge Francophone)
- Release date: 1999
- Running time: 57 minutes
- Countries: Belgium, Morocco

Quand les hommes pleurent (English: When Men Cry) is a 1999 documentary film directed by Yasmine Kassari.

The director spent a summer in the region of Murcia alongside the clandestine workers featured in her documentary. Poems of the Palestinian Mahmoud Darwich are scattered throughout the film. It was screened at a number of international film festivals.

== Synopsis ==
The film follows "men who cry", Moroccan workers who have crossed the Strait of Gibraltar in order to reach Spain, in search of a better future. These migrants soon discover the impasse in which they find themselves, stuck there in living conditions worse than those they knew at home.
