= Al Adl Wa Al Ihssane =

Moroccan Islamist association

Al Adl wal Ihsane Association جماعة العدل و الإحسان
- Chairperson: Mohammed Abbadi
- Spokesperson: Fatallah Arsalane
- Ideology: based on Abdesslam Yassine's ideas

Website
- https://www.aljamaa.net/

Al Adl wal Ihsane (Arabic: العدل والإحسان, romanized: al-ʿAdl wa-l-Iḥsān; Justice and Kindness or Justice and Spirituality) is a Moroccan Islamist association, founded by Cheikh Abdesslam Yassine. This association is not legal but is tolerated by the Moroccan authorities. The current leader is Mohammed Abbadi, who was elected secretary-general of the organization.

== Founder ==
Its founder, Abdessalam Yassine, an old inspector in the Moroccan National Education Ministry was initially a member of tariqa Budshishiyya, a Moroccan Sufi brotherhood that he quit after deploring its evolution and because he was not offered the role of the leader of this brotherhood prior to his son. Yassine was also heavily influenced at his beginnings by the thinking of Sayyid Qutb, he considered that the Moroccan society lives in a fitna (division) under the regime of ignorance. He also started advocating for a policy near Iran's after the revolution.

== Journey ==
Abdessalam Yassine was born in 1928. His father, a poor peasant, belonged to the family of "Ait-Bihi", he proclaims himself an Idrisid Berber from the region of Aoulouz in Sous (Southern Morocco). He completed his primary studies in a school founded in Marrakech by Mohamed Mokhtar Soussi. After four years of studies, he graduated from the Ibn Youssef Institute. He finished his studies at the teacher training school in Rabat in 1947, then worked in national education, for twenty years he was brought to represent Morocco in many international educational meetings. In 1968, he was dismissed from his post without any administrative decision, he was retired in 1987.

== Policies ==
Yassine acted as a charismatic leader for the organisation, which attributes him near saintly-status and operates on lines similar to those a Moroccan Sufi brotherhood, the Budshishiyya, of which Yassine was a member prior to his politicisation.

The party advocates the transformation of Morocco into an Islamic republic, ruled by its interpretation of the Shariah. Like the Muslim Brotherhood, it works for the Islamisation of the whole society, through its grassroots social welfare organisations and important presence in universities.

Contrary to the legalist Justice and Development Party, Al Adl Wa Al Ihssane has not been allowed to transform itself into a political party by the Moroccan government, it has also been argued that it's the party's choice to not do so as it refuses to enter the political game under the current political practices, which it perceives as illegitimate; the party also opposes the article of the Moroccan constitution which states that the king Mohammed VI is also Amir al-Muminin.

=== Three No's ===
The organization's principles were summed up and reaffirmend, during the 24 December 2012 press conference following Mohammed Abbadi election, as "No to violence, no to secrecy, no to foreign intervention."
