= The Day I Became a Woman =

- Movie poster
- Directed by: Marzieh Meshkini
- Written by: Mohsen Makhmalbaf; Marzieh Meshkini
- Produced by: Mohsen Makhmalbaf
- Cinematography: Mohamad Ahmadi; Ebrahim Ghafori
- Edited by: Maysam Makhmalbaf; Shahrzad Pouya
- Music by: Ahmad Reza Darvish
- Distributed by: Olive Films (U.S.)
- Release date: September 1, 2000
- Running time: 78 minutes
- Country: Iran
- Language: Persian
- Budget: $180,000 (estimated)
- Box office: $344,235 (USA sub-total)

The Day I Became a Woman (Persian: روزی که زن شدم, romanized: Roozi ke zan shodam) is a 2000 award-winning Iranian drama film directed by Marzieh Meshkini. It tells three stories, each depicting a different stage in the lives of Iranian women. It premièred at the 2000 Venice Film Festival and won several festival awards during 2000. Critical response was positive with some calling it "Felliniesque".

== Plot ==
The film tells three interconnected stories about women struggling for identity in Iran. Hava, on her ninth birthday, is told by her mother and grandmother that she has become a woman. She may no longer play with her best friend, a boy, and must wear a chador outside the home. Learning that she was born at noon, she convinces them that she remains a child until then. A stick pushed into the ground will mark the time as the shadow at noon will align with the stick. The film follows her activities as she seeks to make the most of her last hour of childhood.

Ahoo is a married woman taking part in a women's cycling race. Leading the field, Ahoo is overtaken by her husband on horseback. He tries to persuade her to stop cycling and come home, and threatens her with divorce. When Ahoo defiantly continues, her husband brings a mullah who divorces them. Later, tribal superiors and male family members come to stop Ahoo as she tries to escape the social constraints of being a woman.

Hoora is an elderly woman who has recently inherited a great deal of money. She decides to buy everything she wanted but could not have while she was married. She ties strings to her fingers to remind her what to buy, and hires several young boys to help her carry the items, including furniture and white goods. They take her and her new belongings to the beach. As she floats out to a waiting ship, seemingly free from the bonds of womanhood, she is watched by two of the young women from the bicycle race, and Hava, now wearing her chador.

== Cast ==
- Fatemeh Cherag Akhar as Hava
- Hassan Nebhan as Hassan
- Shahr Banou Sisizadeh as Mother
- Ameneh Passand as Grandmother
- Shabnam Tolouei as Ahoo
- Sirous Kahvarinegad as Husband
- Mahram Zeinal Zadeh as Osmann
- Norieh Mahigiran as Rival Cyclist
- Azizeh Sedighi as Hoora
- Badr Iravani as Young Boy
- Poorya Bagheri Faez as Young White Boy

== Production ==
The film was co-written by director Marzieh Meshkini, from a script by her husband Mohsen Makhmalbaf. It was shot on Kish Island in the Hormozgān Province in southern Iran. Makhmalbaf was on the island at the same time, shooting Testing Democracy. Some commentators have suggested that Makhmalbaf was the real director of The Day I Became a Woman (as well as the films of his daughters). Critic Jonathan Rosenbaum has argued against these claims. Meshkini has said that as a female filmmaker, she found making a film in Iran particularly difficult, having to prove her abilities to the cast and crew before being accepted by them.

== Distribution and reception ==
The Day I Became a Woman premièred at the 2000 Venice Film Festival. It went on to play at several festivals including the Toronto International Film Festival, the London Film Festival and the New York New Directors/New Films Festival. It was given a limited release in American theatres on April 6, 2001. On its release in Iran, it was temporarily banned.

The film won the ICFT-UNESCO "Enrico Fulchignoni Award" at the Venice Film Festival, the Toronto International Film Festival, the Thessaloniki Film Festival, the Busan International Film Festival, the Oslo Films from the South Festival and the Chicago International Film Festival.

In 2025, the film was showcased in the section 'Decisive Moments in Asian Cinema' at the 30th Busan International Film Festival, as part of the special "Asian Cinema 100", being the signature work of the director Marzieh Meshkini.

Critical response to the film was generally positive. Film review site Rotten Tomatoes gave it a score of 88% based on 59 reviews. Metacritic gave it a score of 84% based on 24 reviews. Writing for the New York Times, Stephen Holden called it a "stunner of a film" and "an astonishing directorial debut". He said that leaving characters' backgrounds and motives unexplored makes the film enigmatic. Roger Ebert said that the three stories lack "the psychological clutter of Western movies", describing this fact as a strength. In the Boston Phoenix, Chris Fujiwara said that the film was "largely successful, describing the second segment as the highlight, and calling the final story disappointing. In The New Yorker, Michael Sragow called the film "fierce, inspired filmmaking". Several critics described it as "Felliniesque".
