= Aïcha Chenna =

Moroccan activist (1941–2022)

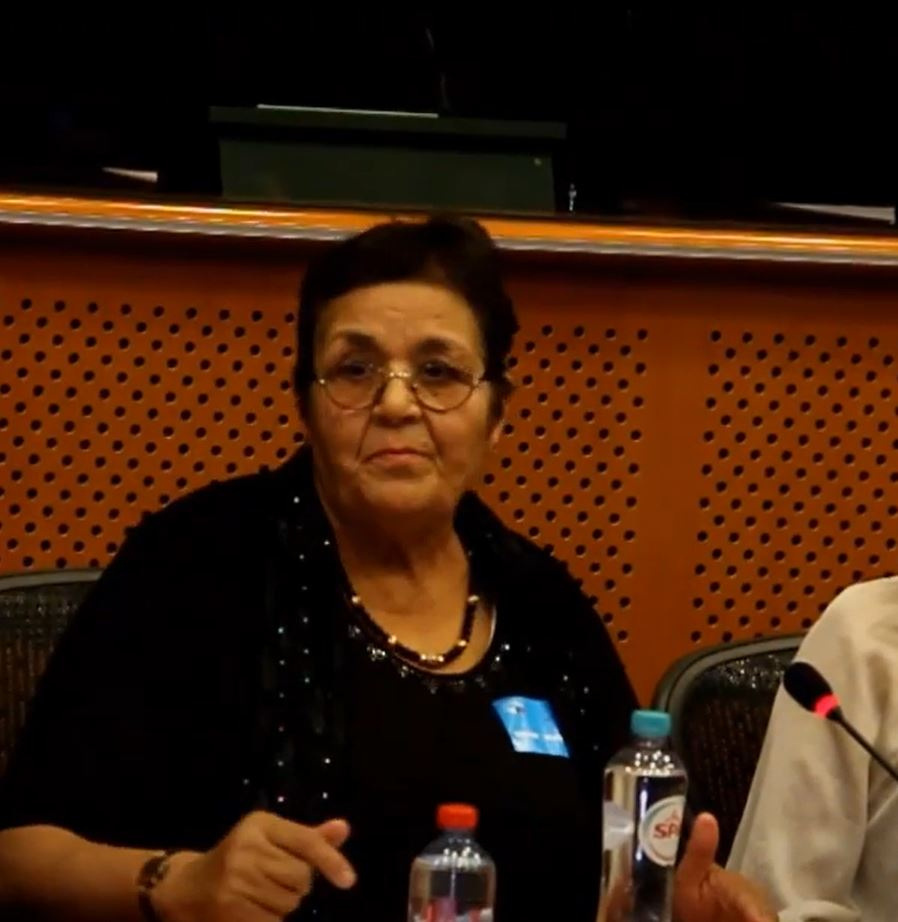
- Chenna in 2016
- Born: Aïcha Chenna; 14 August 1941; Casablanca, Morocco
- Died: 25 September 2022 (aged 81); Casablanca, Morocco
- Occupations: Social worker, nurse and women's right advocate

Aïcha Chenna (Arabic: عائشة الشنا, romanized: ʿĀʾiša aš-Šannā, also Romanized as Aïcha Ech-Chenna; 14 August 1941 – 25 September 2022) was a Moroccan social worker, women's rights advocate and activist. A registered nurse, she began working with disadvantaged women as an employee of the country's Ministry of Health. In 1985, she founded the Association Solidarité Féminine (ASF), a Casablanca-based charity that assists single mothers and victims of abuse. Chenna received various humanitarian awards for her work, including the 2009 Opus Prize (worth US$1 million).

== Early life and education ==
Chenna was born in Casablanca on 14 August 1941, during the time of the French protectorate, and spent her early childhood in Marrakesh. Her father died when she was three, and her mother remarried. Chenna's stepfather wished for her to quit school at the age of 12, but against his wishes her mother sent her back to Casablanca, where she lived with an aunt and continued her education at a French-language school. Her mother joined her in Casablanca three years later, having divorced her stepfather, and subsequently sold her jewellery to support her daughter.

Leaving school at the age of 16, Chenna found work in a hospital, working as a secretary for programs doing research on leprosy and tuberculosis. In 1960, at the urging of friends, she took the exams for nursing school and was accepted. After receiving her nursing diploma, Chenna worked for the education unit at the Ministry of Health, eventually becoming a coordinator of health awareness programs. In the 1970s, she began to produce television and radio programs on women's health including "the first televised show on sanitary education".

== Charity work ==
Chenna's first volunteer work was undertaken in 1959, in a child welfare program. In 1985, she founded the Association Solidarité Féminine (ASF; "Female Solidarity Association"), an organisation dedicated to helping single mothers and abused women. It was initially run out of a basement in Casablanca. The ASF trains women in cooking, sewing, accounting, and various other skills, with the aim of reintegrating them (and their children) into society and giving them independence. It received official non-government organisation (NGO) status from the Moroccan government in 2002, and subsequently received a donation from King Mohammed VI. In 1996, Chenna published Miséria: témoignage (Misery: Testimonies), in which she narrated twenty stories of women she had worked with. The book has been described both as a "feminist proclamation" and a "miscellany of sorrowful stories". It won a prize from the French embassy in Rabat, and was later translated into Arabic.

== Women's rights advocacy ==
Chenna self-described as having "a Muslim heart with a secular mind". During her time as an employee of the Ministry of Health, she became known for her work in areas subject to social and religious taboos, including family planning, the status of single mothers, the status of illegitimate children and abandoned children, and the status of incest victims. She regularly received criticism from social conservatives, who said that her work legitimised immoral behaviour. In 2009, Chenna was awarded the Opus Prize (worth US$1 million) for her work with disadvantaged women. She was the first Muslim to win the award, which is managed by a foundation partnering with Catholic universities and awarded for faith-based humanitarian work, and said that the prize money would go to ensuring her foundation continued after her death. She also received the Monte Carlo Woman of the Year Award in 2017 in recognition of efforts in "promoting civil rights for a vulnerable social category".

== Death ==
Chenna died on 25 September 2022 at a hospital in Casablanca.
