= Stray Dogs (2004 film) =

- Directed by: Marzieh Meshkini
- Written by: Marzieh Meshkini
- Produced by: Maysam Makhmalbaf
- Starring: Gol-Ghotai; Zahed
- Cinematography: Ebrahim Ghafori; Maysam Makhmalbaf
- Edited by: Mastaneh Mohajer
- Music by: Mohammad-Reza Darvishi
- Release date: 2004
- Running time: 93 minutes
- Country: Iran
- Language: Persian

Stray Dogs (Persian: Sag-haye velgard) is an Iranian film written and directed by Marzieh Meshkini. It is a story about two orphaned children in post-Taliban Afghanistan.

== Plot details ==
A girl named Gol-Ghotai and a boy named Zahed are siblings living in post-Taliban Kabul. Their father is a mullah. He had fought against American soldiers in a Taliban War and was eventually imprisoned. The mother of the children was also imprisoned. She had remarried, as she believed her husband was dead in the war and is now being accused of infidelity. Gol-Ghotai and Zahed spend every night with their mother in jail. They call themselves "night prisoners."

One day, the prison commander bans all "night prisoners," and the children become homeless. Since it is wintertime, they attempt to find a place to stay overnight, but still they dream of returning to their mother's jail cell. They are advised to steal something to be arrested by the police and get sent to prison. The children conduct several robbery attempts, but no one notices. Finally, Zahed manages to steal a bicycle, and his sister tries to get passersby to notice by crying and calling him a thief. Zahed is imprisoned, but in a different jail cell from his mother's.
