= Mudawana =

Family code in Moroccan law

The Mudawana (or Moudawana, Arabic: المدوّنة, lit. 'code'), short for mudawwanat al-aḥwāl ash-shakhṣiyyah (مدونة الأحوال الشخصية, lit. 'personal status code'), is the personal status code, also known as the family code, in Moroccan law. It concerns issues related to the family, including the regulation of marriage, polygamy, divorce, inheritance, and child custody. Originally based on the Maliki school of Sunni Islamic jurisprudence, it was codified after the country gained independence from France in 1956. Its most recent revision, passed by the Moroccan parliament in 2004, was praised by human rights activists for its measures to address women's rights and gender equality within an Islamic legal framework.

Although there were calls for reform to the family law in the 1960s and 1970s, its religious origins made amending it a challenge, and no serious movement for reform emerged until the 1980s. As a result of newly created civil society organizations, including many women's organizations, and increased international attention on women's rights, modest reforms to the Mudawana were enacted in 1993 under King Hassan II. Following this initial change, increased activism resulted in the articulation of a Plan of Action for the Integration of Women in Development, which drew heavily from secular, rights-based frameworks. This sparked fierce debate and opposition within Moroccan political elites and, to a somewhat lesser extent, Moroccan society and culminated in two rallies in Casablanca and Rabat in March 2000 – one in support of reform and one in opposition to it. This occurred shortly after Mohammad VI succeeded his father as King, and within a year of the rallies, he announced the formation of a commission to further reform the Mudawana. In 2003, he announced his intention to replace the code entirely, citing his authority as both spiritual and political leader of the nation, and by January 2004, the Moroccan parliament had ratified the new version.

Major components of the reforms included raising the minimum legal age of marriage to 18 for men and women, establishing joint responsibility for the family among men and women, limiting the terms of polygamy and divorce, and granting women more rights in the negotiation of marriage contracts, among other provisions. Supporters of the reforms point to broad support for them among Moroccan society, especially among women, and cite the new law as a successful example of a progressive reform framed in indigenous, Islamic principles. Critics of the reforms point to the elitist roots of the movements that advocated for the reforms, the influence of Western secular principles, and the many barriers to the law's implementation within Moroccan society.

== Background ==
=== Origins of Al-Mudawana ===
Malik ibn Anas, the founder of the Maliki school of Sunni Islam, wrote Al-Muwatta, which was an 8th-century collection of hadith, or sayings, of Muhammad, his family, and his companions. These sayings were collected and published by Malik, along with commentary. This formed the foundation of one of the four major Sunni schools of Islamic jurisprudence still in existence today. The Maliki school has been the dominant source of Islamic jurisprudence in Morocco since the 10th century.

=== Moroccan government ===
Morocco has been described as a "liberalized autocracy." Its constitution grants the majority of executive powers to the monarch, including the power to appoint major ministers and regional governors, and the power to set the priorities of the national agenda; this effectively limits the power of political parties and the elected members of Parliament. Many argue that the electoral system's main function is to serve as a means for the monarchy to create and manipulate a dependent class of political elites. Practically speaking, despite multiparty elections, the monarchy, and not parliament, is the site of strategic political decision-making in Morocco.

The King is not only a political leader, but also holds the title "Amir al-Mu'minin" (Commander of the Faithful), indicating his role as a religious leader as well. The royal family of Morocco, which claims descent from Muhammad, therefore enjoys a sense of political legitimacy rooted in Islam and also has the power to dictate the form that Islam takes within Moroccan society. As a result, this traditional form of religious authority gives the monarch the political legitimacy to arbitrate the agenda and decisions of a modern, multiparty government.

Generally speaking, the monarchy, Islam, and the territorial integrity of the Moroccan nation are considered to be the nation's three inviolable "sacred institutions." Challenges to these three institutions, whether through questioning the king's authority or the legitimacy of Islamic law as the basis for legal codes, are technically imprisonable offenses. These conditions have impacted the process of reforming Moroccan family law significantly.

== The Mudawana in Modern Morocco ==
Historically, the creation of the Mudawana in Moroccan law represented a major step in the political and legal unification of Morocco after it gained independence from the French. Its first version was written in 1957-8 by a group of ten male religious scholars (Ulama) working under the auspices of the monarchy; its substance drew heavily on classical Maliki law. As the French had ruled Morocco with a policy of legal pluralism (maintaining, for example, the existence of Berber customary law within Berber communities), the new Mudawana was intended to signify the nation's unity, Islamic identity, and modernity. It did this in part by codifying the system of existing patriarchal, kin-based social structures within the newly independent state. In addition, the Mudawana is the only section of Moroccan law that relies primarily on Islamic sources, rather than Spanish or French civil codes, which gave it a greater sense of immutability and contributed to the difficulty of reforming it later on. A state's family or personal status law has wide-ranging implications for citizens' daily lives, but many gender equality advocates point out its particular significance for women, as it governs the age at which they may be married, issues of divorce and child custody, and their right to work and travel outside the home. Even as various Muslim-majority states have expanded public civil and political rights for women, separate family laws rooted in Shari'a have often remained unchanged; for many Muslims, these family laws remain an untouchable symbol of Muslim identity.

=== Women and civil society: foundations of reform ===
In 1969, King Hassan II created the Union Nationale des Femmes Marocaines (UNFM), an organization with the stated goal of improving the social and economic status of women in Morocco. The activities of the UNFM focused less on legal reform and more on professional and training programs for women. It was given the legal status of a utilité publique, an important designation for Moroccan civil society organizations, which allows them to raise funds and be exempt from taxes (similar to non-profit status in the United States). Historically, this distinction, which must be conferred by the government, has provided a way for the Moroccan regime to exert a measure of control over civil society organizations, as those whose agendas conflict with that of the government typically find it difficult to obtain utilité publique status. Without this license, an association will have difficulty securing funding and has no right to recourse within the Moroccan justice system.

In the 1980s, a financial crisis led King Hassan II to implement a program of structural adjustment that included some social reforms, leading to increased activity among political and civil society organizations. This included the founding of many new women's associations, many of which began as affiliates of existing political parties. This affiliation lends them a sense of legitimacy as well as connections and support, but some argue that it limits their autonomy as well.

The proliferation of civil society organizations flourished even more in the 1990s, due in part to King Hassan II's active support for them, which reflected a worldwide trend of civil society promotion. Some have argued that the king's support was motivated as much by international pressures and his desire to join the European Union as domestic economic and political problems. It was in this environment that calls for reform to the Mudawana first began to gain traction. All of Morocco's major women's organizations have positioned their work within an Islamic framework in some way, drawing on the work of Islamic scholars to inform their agendas.

=== Early calls for reform ===
Despite numerous calls for reform throughout the 1960s and 70s, it was not until 1982 that women's legal status was brought to the forefront of public debate in Morocco. Eventually, public debates and discussions led to a broad rewriting of the Mudawana in 2003–4, which many attribute to the increase in activity and organization within Moroccan civil society in the 1990s as well as a changing international environment surrounding women's rights and gender equality. Beginning in the 1990s, women's rights organizations in Morocco gained leverage and influence by incorporating progressive elements from academia, publishing, and government, and using rhetoric that drew from Islamic sources as well as the language of national development and the rights of women and children.

In 1991, this was manifested in concrete political action as l’Union de l’Action Féminine (UAF), a women's group within one of Morocco's Marxist–Leninist political parties and consisting mainly of professional, middle-class women, collected one million signatures on a petition calling for Mudawana reform and presented it to the Prime Minister. This move demonstrated significant political support behind the idea of reform, and framed the issue more as one of politics and human rights than religion (indicated in part by the delivery of the petition to the prime minister, the nominal head of the government, as opposed to the king of Morocco, who is also a spiritual leader). Their primary aims were to change certain elements of the code, including polygamy and the principle that a husband has ultimate authority over his wife. The proposed reforms drew not only on principles derived from the Universal Declaration of Human Rights but also on the Islamic principles of equality, justice, and tolerance. In response, King Hassan II created a commission (which he chaired) composed of 21 religious scholars – only one of them female – and a representative of the Royal Court for the purpose of reforming the Mudawana according to the Islamic tradition of ijtihad. The events were not without controversy, however, generating both a counter-petition as well as a fatwa directed against the women's demands.

=== Increased activism and 1993 reforms ===
This commission resulted in a number of changes, implemented in 1993, which instituted provisions that (among other things) required a bride's verbal consent to marriage, eliminated a father's right to force his daughter to marry, and mandated the obtainment of a judge's permission in cases of polygamy and a husband's repudiation of his wife. Generally these reforms were considered superficial, but significant as an indicator that the Mudawana was not an unchangeable standard, as it had previously been perceived. Considering the religious origin of the laws, the fact that they had been amended at all was a significant step in demonstrating that they were subject to the process of ijtihad and not completely unchangeable.

Towards the end of his reign, in the late 1990s, King Hassan II opened up the political process to opposition parties, such as the Socialist Union of Popular Forces (USFP) and the Party of Progress and Socialism (PPS). The latter, which came to be associated with the Democratic Association of Moroccan Women (ADFM), played a key role in a working group that examined the family code. This group, with input from several Moroccan women's organizations and funding from the World Bank, produced Le Plan d’action national pour l’intégration de la femme au développement (The Plan of Action for the Integration of Women in Development, or PAIWD). By the time the plan was introduced, King Hassan II had died and his son, King Mohammed VI, had taken the throne.

=== The PAIWD and opposition ===
The PAIWD was formulated and promoted in the context of Morocco's 1993 ratification of the Convention on the Elimination of All Forms of Discrimination Against Women (CEDAW), the Platform for Action established at the Beijing Conference on Women in 1995, and the Moroccan government's subsequent commitment to developing a national strategy to address the status of women that year. Arising from this context, the PAIWD did not explicitly reference Islamic values, and was more closely related to a "development discourse" that formed a crucial element of Mohammad VI's national agenda. The PAIWD's main areas of focus were education, reproductive health, the involvement of women in development, and empowerment through legal reforms and a strengthening of political power.

The creation of the PAIWD, and the stir it caused, effectively created two opposing political factions among Morocco's political elite, one identifying as "modernists" lobbying against the influence of Islamic extremists and the other identifying as traditionalists who insisted that newly proposed reforms were rooted in Western interference. In particular, the Moroccan minister for religious affairs opposed the plan, and the Moroccan cabinet became divided over the issue. The debate extended beyond the realm of the political elite, however, eventually sparking enormous rallies in March 2000. Different sources cite varying accounts as to how many people attended each rally, with estimates ranging from 60,000 to over 1 million at each - with each side claiming it had more attendees present. Press coverage of the two actions noted the differences between them; the Casablanca march, in opposition to the PAIWD, was generally more gender-segregated, with more uniformity of dress, whereas in Rabat, participants of different genders mixed more freely. These figures, and the differences between the two rallies, illustrate a polarization that exists in Moroccan society through today, and the divisions and controversy associated with it, along with the rise of Islamic movements in Morocco, ultimately prevented the PAIWD's implementation. One point of common ground between both factions was an appeal to the king for arbitration. Traditionalists felt only the king had the right to change the law and the modernists felt that the king had the right to exercise ijtihad and ultimately decide the role that Islamic law would play in Morocco's legal framework. Moreover, many scholars and activists have pointed out that there was strong support for reform from both sides of the debate; the conflict lay in the source of the reforms and in questions of cultural authenticity.

=== Reforms of 2004 ===
On 5 March 2001, a year after the rallies in Casablanca and Rabat, Mohammed VI announced the formation of a commission to reform the Mudawana, members of which included a Supreme Court justice, religious scholars, political representatives, and intellectuals from a number of different backgrounds, including female representatives from women's organizations. At the same time, the king took several steps viewed as promoting women's status in Moroccan society, including mandating that 10 percent of seats in the lower house of the Moroccan parliament be reserved for women and promoting several women to senior administrative positions within his government. On October 10, 2003, the king presented Parliament with a plan to replace the old Mudawana entirely, on the commission's recommendation, describing the new law code as "modern" and intended to "free women from the injustices they endure, in addition [to] protecting children’s rights and safeguarding men’s dignity." In doing so, he emphasized that the reforms were not intended to address women's rights exclusively, but to address issues associated with the family as a whole.

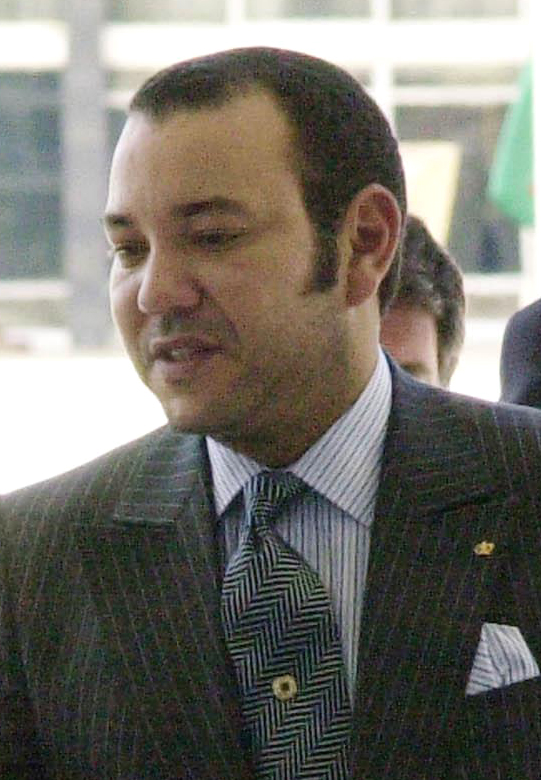
Mohammed VI of Morocco, 2004

The king also cited his role as "Commander of the Faithful," referring to his role as both political and religious leader of Morocco, and pointed out that as such, "I can neither prohibit what is legal nor sanction that which is illicit." When announcing the reforms, the king emphasized their compatibility with Islamic principles, quoting supporting passages from the Qur'an and the Hadith. He also indicated that he sought to "reflect the general will of the nation" rather than impose legislation from above, and described the reform as not a victory for one side or the other.

Whereas the original Mudawana and its 1993 reforms were enacted by royal decree, the 2004 reforms were deliberated upon extensively in Parliament, which made over 100 amendments to the code before ratifying it in January 2004. After the reforms were announced, the United States government, the World Bank, and Human Rights Watch all released statements of support for the new laws. Likewise, the European Union considered Morocco to be the "most advanced country on the southern shore of the Mediterranean" in terms of rule of law and democratization.

== Major provisions of the updated code ==
1. Both spouses share responsibility for the family; "women are men’s sisters before the law."
2. Once a woman comes of age, she does not need a marital tutor (a male relative, usually the father who speaks on her behalf). Women cannot be married against their will, though if they wish to designate a male relative to act as their marital tutor, they may.
3. The minimum age for men and women to be married is 18 unless specified by a judge; in addition, boys and girls under custody may choose their custodian once they reach the age of 15.
4. A man may only take a second wife if a judge authorizes it, and only if there is an exceptional and objective justification for it, the first wife consents, and the man has sufficient resources to support the two families and guarantee all maintenance rights, accommodation and equality in all aspects of life. Moreover, a woman can stipulate in her marriage contract that her husband may not take a second wife, and a first wife must consent to the second. The first wife may also petition for divorce if the husband takes another wife.
5. Moroccans living abroad may complete a marriage contract by drawing it up in the presence of two Muslim witnesses, according to the local laws, and registering it with local Moroccan consular or judicial authorities.
6. The right to petition for divorce belongs to both men and women, though procedures for reconciliation and mediation are encouraged. A man may not repudiate his wife without the permission of a judge, and she and her children must be accorded their full rights under the law. Divorce proceedings take place in a secular court, rather than before a religious official. (See Islamic marital jurisprudence).
7. If a man does not fulfill his obligations according to the marriage contract, or causes his wife harm such as abandonment or violence, she has the right to file for divorce; the new law also provides for divorce in situations of mutual consent.
8. Children's rights are protected according to the international conventions Morocco has signed. Priority in terms of child custody goes first to the mother, then the father, then the maternal grandmother, or to whomever a judge deems the most qualified relative. Children in custody must be given "suitable accommodation," the terms of which must be settled within a month of any dispute. The parent who gains custody of the child keeps the house.
9. Children born outside of wedlock have the right to the acknowledgment of paternity.
10. A man's daughter's children as well as his son's children have the right to inherit property.
11. A married couple may negotiate an agreement separate from the marriage contract regarding the management of assets they acquire while married (this does not negate the principle of separate marital property).

== Reactions and implementation ==
=== Awareness ===
According to a 2010 survey, awareness of the reforms varies widely within the Moroccan population, with younger, urban, and educated women far more likely to have heard of the law and have some familiarity with its provisions than women in rural areas, those with less education, and older women. Of Moroccans who have heard of the new Mudawana, 85% of women and 59% of men support the reforms. Most men who oppose the reforms believe the law negatively impacts them, gives greater weight to their spouses' demands, and view it as contrary to their religious beliefs. Women's dissatisfaction with the Mudawana, however, reflects a belief that it is not implemented widely and successfully enough to address the problems of women's rights. Two-thirds of Moroccan women surveyed said they felt the new Mudawana had improved women's status in Morocco, and 50% of men agreed.

=== Positive reactions and support ===
When announcing the reforms, Mohammad VI indicated that he sought to "reflect the general will of the nation" rather than impose legislation, and emphasized that the reform did not represent a "victory" for one side or the other.

Many groups and individuals (both in Morocco and abroad) reacted favorably to the revised code, pointing out that from an economic perspective, it finally legally recognized women's economic contributions to the household – not an insignificant point, as in 2000, women represented over a third of the Moroccan workforce. Supporters point out that the reforms indicate a democratization of Moroccan society on two fronts: because of the sense of pluralism and debate they sparked in the public sphere, and because of their movement towards an individual-based rights system, as opposed to one based on collective rights.

Many activists and scholars embrace the reforms as evidence that gender equality is compatible with Islamic principles; indeed, some scholars have argued that what they consider to be an authentic interpretation of Shari'a actually requires reforms in the name of gender equality. Furthermore, many women's groups and feminist activists in Morocco hold the view that religion must be incorporated into any reformist framework for it to be acceptable to the Moroccan population, and as such, the reforms represent a progressive step without alienating the majority of the society.

=== Negative reactions and opposition ===
Opponents to the law assert that the reforms represent an imposition of legislation that does not enjoy broad support, pointing out that opinion polls often favor urban populations and are not representative of Moroccan society as a whole. Many Islamic groups have emphasized that they do not oppose reform of the Mudawana in general, but reject what they view as reforms rooted in externally imposed principles, such as those based in international human rights law, as opposed to exclusively Islamic origins.

Some have described the women's rights movement in Morocco as a movement of elites and criticized the new Mudawana on similar grounds. Most women's organizations in Morocco receive external funding, whether from the government, various Moroccan political parties, or international actors such as USAID, the European Development Bank, and the World Bank, which has left them open to criticisms that their agendas are tied to the sources of their funding and therefore compromised. However, some scholars have argued that just because the movement was started among elites, it does not necessarily follow that they are incongruent with grassroots interests. Still others point out that in an even broader sense, the universal notion of formal equality itself may not be evenly applicable or relevant to women from different social, cultural, and national backgrounds.

Furthermore, just as some scholars praise what they see as a confirmation of the compatibility of Islam and gender equality, others point out that by requiring the framing of gender equality within an Islamic framework, the means by which Muslim women can advocate for equality is inherently limited. This process also arguably reduces Islamic women to a single, universal category that does not recognize their individual choices. Critics consequently point out that the Mudawana represents an improvement in women's status but still falls short of establishing their full equal standing with men in either the family or the social sphere. For example, the law still recognizes the father as head of the family and designates him the default legal tutor to his children.

Other critics of the Mudawana point out that irrespective of the value of the reforms themselves, the process by which they were achieved is flawed, creates difficulties for their implementation, and can even be considered counter-productive to the process of democratization. It can be argued that while the reforms do represent a significant transformation of women's rights, they also serve to solidify and expand the authority of the monarch as the defender or insurer of those rights. In the end, the civil society associations that lobbied for the reforms had to work within the existing authoritarian system, appealing directly to the king for change rather than working through a democratic political process. Ultimately, the credit for the reforms' successful enactment has been given to the monarchy. Finally, some characterize the high degree of debate and deliberation over the issue as a dividing influence in the end; a representative from one Moroccan women's organization described the women's movement in Morocco not as a movement, but an uncoordinated group of different organizations.

=== Barriers to implementation ===
There are social, legal, logistical, and political barriers to the actual implementation of many of the reforms in the new Mudawana. The top-down nature of the reforms has resulted in many members of the judicial system simply ignoring the new laws’ provisions. Other problems with the judicial system include a lack of training among the judiciary and provisions of the law that allow individual judges to consult principles of Shari'a in situations that are not covered by the Mudawana. This could open the door to an application of older, pre-reform style judicial decisions.

In terms of social barriers, there is a significant gap between formal legal reforms in theory and their practice in reality. In Morocco's rural and underdeveloped areas, legal equality is perceived as less of an immediate priority than basic, everyday needs. High levels of female illiteracy and a strong sense of traditionalism in many rural areas further compound these challenges. Despite educational campaigns undertaken by various governmental and non-governmental actors (often supported by donor nations such as EU member states), levels of awareness about the reforms remain low, especially in many rural areas, where misinformation about the details of the changes has often filled the knowledge gap. Many supporters of the reforms believe that lack of awareness of the law is the primary barrier to its implementation, with a lack of legal literacy compounded by the fact that many Moroccans speak a Berber dialect rather than the formal Arabic in which the law is actually written.

From a legal standpoint, the Moroccan penal code still does not reflect the principles of gender equality established within the provisions of the Mudawana. For example, a woman still needs her husband's permission to obtain a passport and can be penalized for having a child out of wedlock, and there is no legislation addressing or criminalizing violence against women. Judges also retain the right to oversee mandatory reconciliation in the case of divorce, which many women's organizations fear will be used to limit women's autonomy during divorce proceedings.

Logistically, the new code created a new system of family courts to handle family law matters, presenting the complex challenges of establishing a new, nationwide system from scratch while provoking opposition among adouls, the local legal officials who previously had jurisdiction over marriage and family matters. Some critics have even classified the family court system as a lower or "second-class" justice system for women.

In terms of political barriers, some classify the reformed Mudawana as an example of strategic liberalization, typical within certain "liberalized autocracies," that arises out of internal and external pressures but is ultimately limited in the extent of its reforms. The argument that follows is that the reforms are essentially superficial because it is in the government's interest to favor the maintenance of the status quo over the potential conflict that would arise were the reforms to be implemented on a full scale.

=== Results of implementation ===
Five years after the new Mudawana laws were passed, the president of the ADFM noted that opposition to its reforms was still present throughout the judicial system. While polygamy had become nearly nonexistent, she noted, one out of every ten marriages still involved a minor as of 2007, and the system was facing organizational challenges. Some reports claim that marriage of underage girls has actually risen since the passing of the reforms, and point out that the actual existence of separate marital property contracts remains low, despite their being newly legalized, meaning that the reforms offer little actual protection to women whose husbands order them to leave the marital home.

However, there is some evidence that the reforms are not totally without effect. According to the Moroccan Ministry of Justice, in 2008 there were more marriages and slightly fewer divorces in Morocco. Of the divorces granted, almost 30% were divorce by mutual consent – which did not exist before the 2004 reforms. Moreover, while over 14,000 divorce proceedings were initiated by men, over 26,000 were initiated by women in 2007; before the reforms, women did not have the right to initiate these proceedings. Finally, the number of women arranging their own marriages increased by over 14% between 2006 and 2007.

Rabha El Haymar is an example of a Moroccan woman who used the changes to argue for the rights of her illegitimate child. Her bravery, in taking the risk of reputational damage, was the subject of a documentary on Moroccan TV and she was recognised internationally for her stand on women's rights in 2024.

=== Cultural references ===
- The Mudawana and the status of Moroccan women are the subject of Lalla Mennana, a song by the popular Moroccan hip-hop group Fnaire.
- The 2008 film Number One, produced in Morocco and scripted in Moroccan Arabic with French subtitles, is a comedy portraying the effects of the new Mudawana from a male perspective.
- The 2014 film Bastards, a heroic portrait of Rabha El Haymar, a Moroccan woman who fought to have her marriage recognized and her daughter legitimized in the Moroccan judicial system, per the 2024 reforms of the Mudawana.
- In the 2023 film The Divorcees of Casablanca, divorce in Morocco is seen through the lives of five women from different social and economic backgrounds while they struggle to overcome societal ignorance about the Mudawana and legal protection of women.

== See also ==
- Human rights in Morocco
- Algerian Family Code
- Child custody
- Divorce (conflict)
- List of parenting issues affecting separated parents
- Marriage (conflict)
- Religion and divorce
- Sleeping child
- Women's rights
- Code of Personal Status (Tunisia)
- Sharia
- Women in Islam
