= Amina Lemrini =

Moroccan activist

Amina Lemrini El Ouahabi
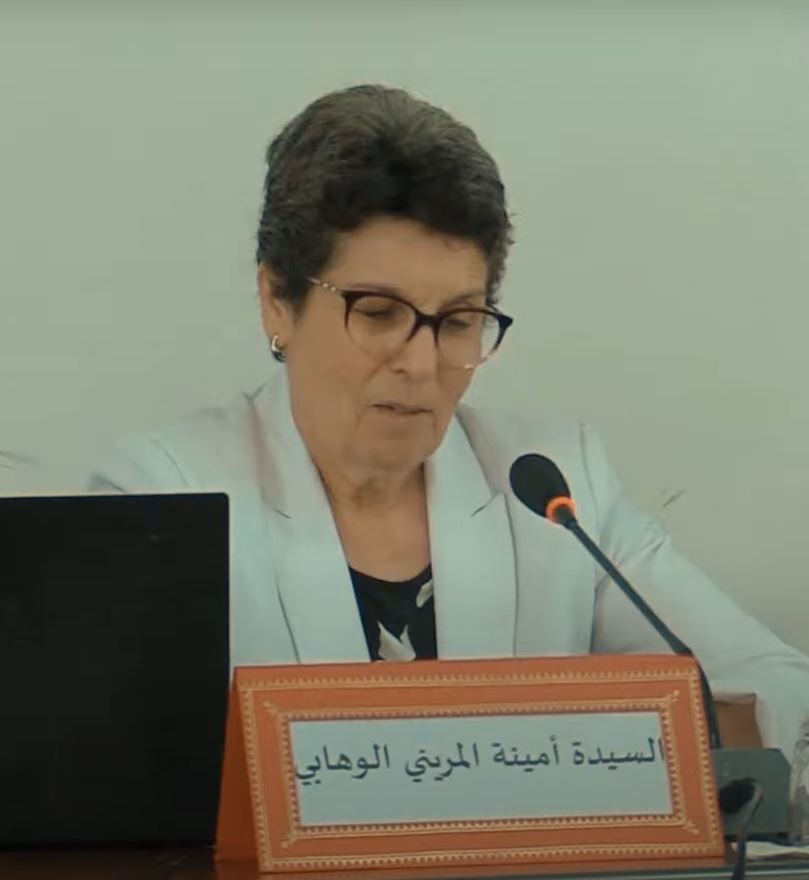
- Born: Morocco
- Education: PhD in Educational Science
- Occupation: Human rights activist
- Known for: President of the Higher Council of Audiovisual Communication

Amina Lemrini El Ouahabi is a Moroccan human rights activist, and the president of Morocco's Haute Autorité de la communication audiovisuelle (Higher Council of Audiovisual Communication).

== Early life ==
Lamrini earned a PhD (doctorat d'État) in educational science.

== Career ==
Lamrini is the co-founder and former president of the Democratic Association of Moroccan Women (Association Démocratique des Femmes Marocaines).

Lamrini is a founding member of the Moroccan Organization for Human Rights (OMDH).

In May 2012, King Mohammed VI appointed Lamrini as the President of the Higher Council of Audiovisual Communication, at the Royal Palace in Rabat. She succeeded Ahmed Ghazali, following his sudden dismissal. She has been called a "un choix emblématique" (an iconic choice), and a left-winger committed to human rights and democracy.

== Publications ==
Lamrini has published a pedagogic guidebook on education and children's rights, and has written articles and publications on issues surrounding to women's emancipation including, "L’image de la femme dans le discours scolaire" and "Femmes et développement humain: cas du Maroc".

== Personal life ==
She is the mother of two children.
