= Union Progressite des femmes Marocaines =

The Union Progressite des femmes Marocaines (UPFM) was a women's organization in Morocco, founded in 1961.

UPFM originated from the workers union movement. Its purpose was to work for better educational and professional opportunities for women, better working conditions for women, justice, freedom, democracy, women's rights, and reform in civil law and the end of gender discrimination. The women's movement in Morocco begun in connection with the liberation struggle against the French colonial regime in the 1940s, but it died down after Morocco became an independent country and granted women's suffrage in 1956, and the UPFM was the revival of the women's movement in Morocco. However, the UPFM was not to last many years. It was succeeded by the Union Nationale des Femmes Marocaines.
