= Aoulouz =

Coordinates: 30°42′N 8°09′W

Aoulouz ⴰⵡⵍⵓⵥ أولوز
- Rural commune and town
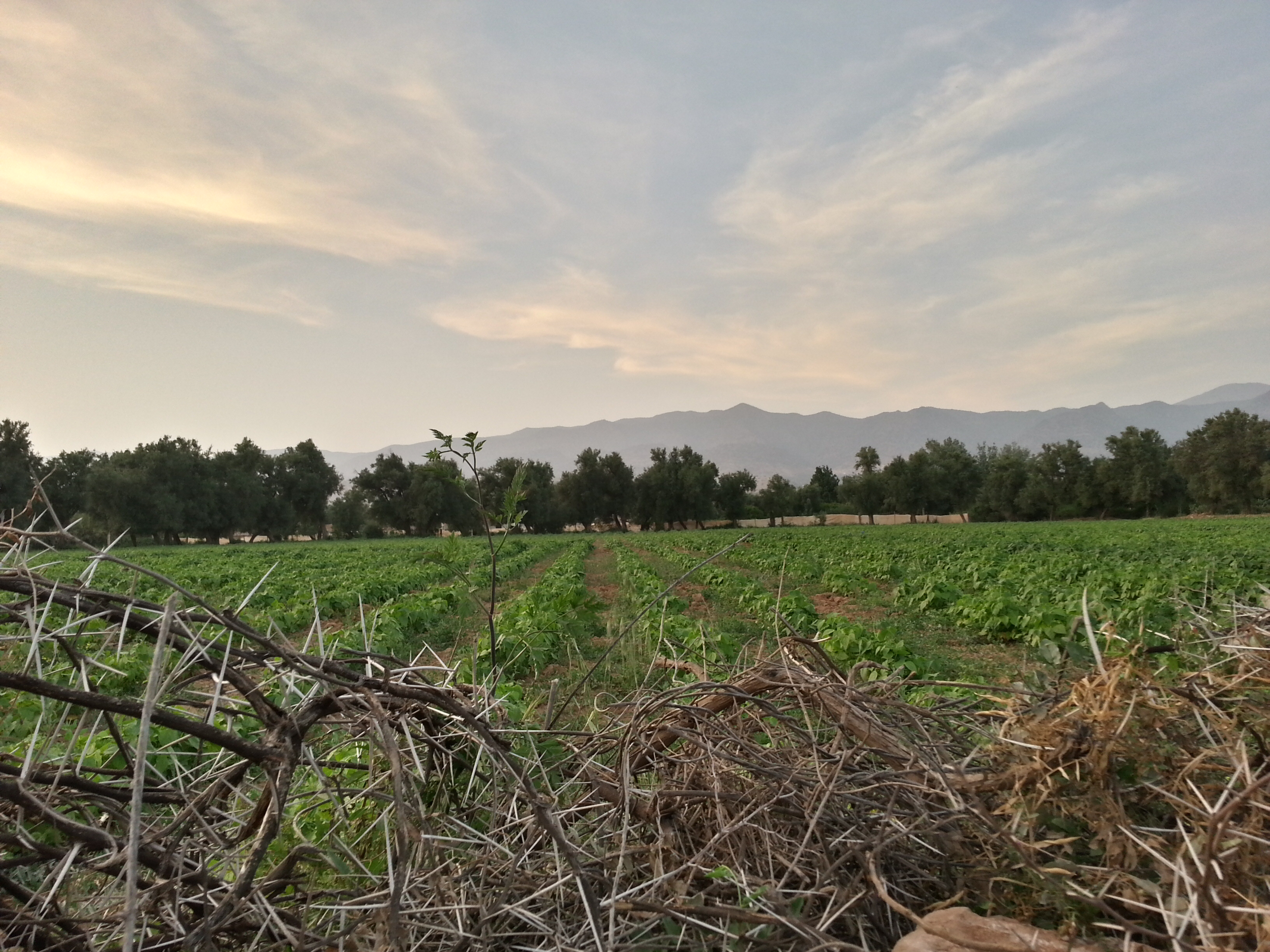
- Interactive map of Aoulouz
- Country: Morocco
- Region: Souss-Massa
- Province: Taroudant Province

Population (2004)
  - Total: 5,756
- Time zone: UTC+0 (GMT)

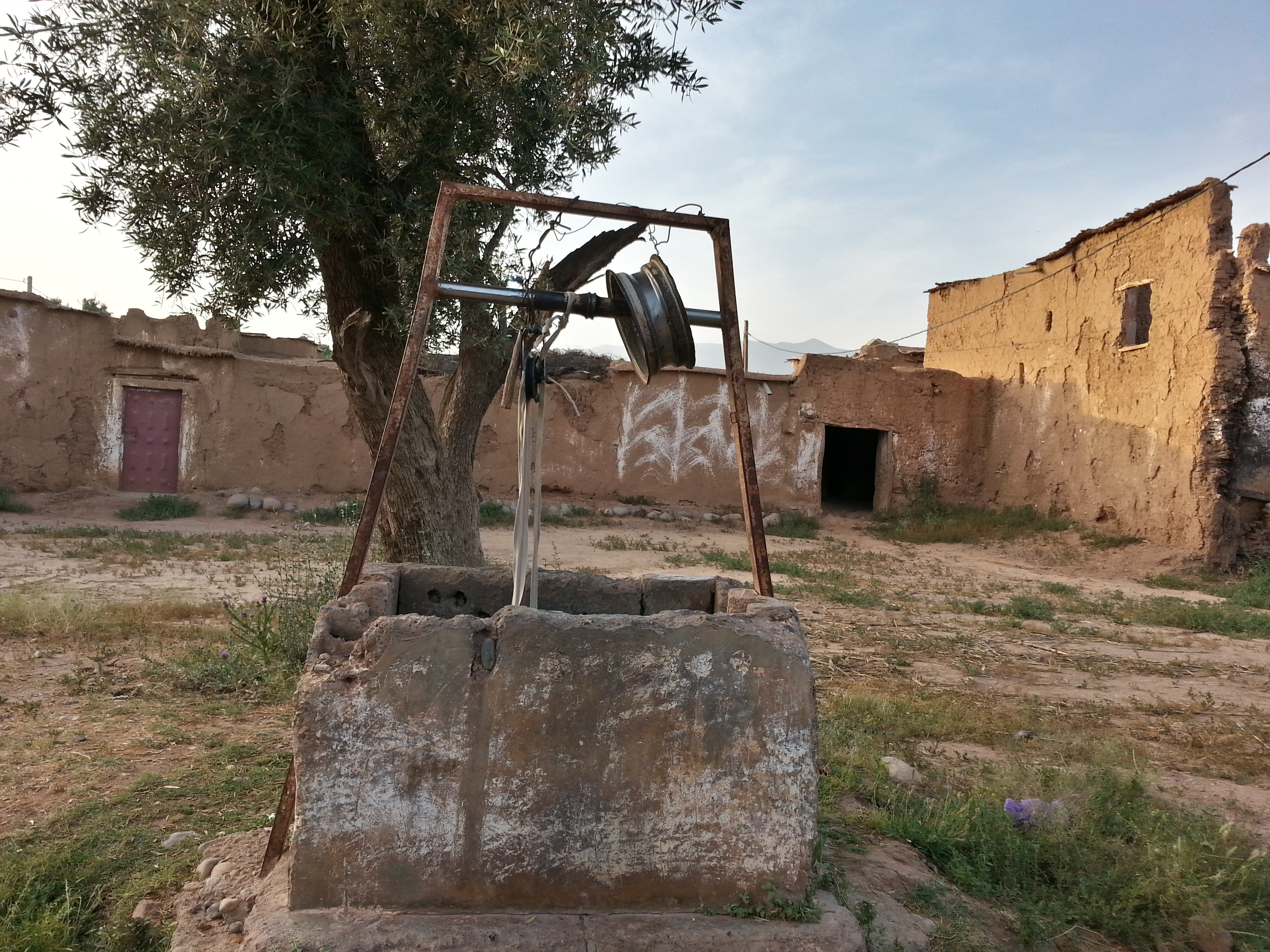
Aoulouz in 2015

Aoulouz or Aoullouz (in Tachelhit: ⴰⵡⵍⵓⵥ) is a rural commune and small town in Taroudant Province, Souss-Massa Region, Morocco. According to the 2004 census it has a population of 5,756.
