= Budshishiyya =

Sufi order

The Budshishiyya (Arabic: بودشيشية) is a Moroccan Sufi order (tariqa), a branch of the Qadiriyya. Abu Madyan ibn Munawar al-Budshish established the order in northeastern Morocco in the 1940s. It is the largest tariqa in Morocco, with several hundred thousand followers. Outside of Morocco, France is home to the greatest number of adherents, including both Maghrebi immigrants and French converts. In France, the politician Bariza Khiari and the rapper Abd al Malik are among its members.
