= Democratic Association of Moroccan Women =

Moroccan women's rights organization established in 1985

The Democratic Association of Moroccan Women (Association Démocratique de Femmes de Maroc, ADFM) is a Moroccan women's rights organization established in 1985. It aims to establish legislation based on equality between men and women, targeting the media to lobby for women's rights. The ADFM has been described as the "cornerstone of feminism in Morocco".

== History ==
The Democratic Association of Moroccan Women was founded in Rabat in 1985. Its co-founders included Rabia Nacir, Amina Lamrini, Farida Bennani, and Najia Zirari. As an organization, the ADFM grew out of the women's section of the Party of Progress and Socialism (PPS). Amina Lamrini was a member of the PPS central committee, and the ADFM has kept up an association with the PPS. However, it has also needed to assert its political independence. As the activist Raja El Habti emphasised,

it was important for the ADFM to become completely politically independent from the party, it order to develop its strategies idenependely from party strategies [...] The parties want to keep their seats in parliament or in politics in general, that's why all women's associations that are directly associated to a political party can't work for their cause.

Rather than trying to be a mass women's movement, the ADFM has been an intellectual pressure group working with intermediaries such as "teachers, the media, political parties, trade unions, and youth organizations". In the judgment of one scholar, the ADFM and the Union of Women's Action (UAF) "have formed the benchmark of feminist activism in Morocco since the mid-1980s [...] defining the women's movement as a challenge to the legal source of the subjugation of women". It has particularly campaigned to reform the Moroccan family law code, known as the Mudawana. For instance after a national campaign in 1993, a 13 July 1995 Royal decree abolished the male tutelage requirement that women secure their husband's permission before being allowed to work.
