= The Sleeping Child =

- Directed by: Yasmine Kassari
- Written by: Yasmine Kassari
- Starring: Mounia Osfour; Rachida Brakni; Nermine Elhaggar; Fatna Abdessamie; Khamsa Abdessamie; Issa Abdessamie; Mimoun Abdessamie
- Release date: 2004
- Running time: 95 minutes
- Country: Morocco
- Languages: Berber; Moroccan Arabic

The Sleeping Child (in French, L'Enfant endormi) is a 2004 Belgian-Moroccan movie written and directed by Yasmine Kassari. The film has obtained several prizes like Trophée du Premier Scénario, from CNC (Centre national de la cinématographie).

== Plot ==
In Atlas Mountains, Zeinab (Mounia Osfour), realises she's pregnant when her husband migrates to Europe along with other men from the village. Her mother-in-law convinces her to sleep the foetus, in keeping with an old white magic tradition very spread in Maghribian rural world. According to Kassari, this plot-point serves as the "luminous point that sheds light on the situation of these women who have remained alone in the country, facing the absence of their men," which, as stated by Florence Martin, presents the viewer with "the womanly gaze on male emigration."
