= Yasmine Kassari =

Moroccan film director (born 1970)

- Born: 3 October 1970 (age 55); Jerada, Morocco
- Occupation: Film director
- Known for: multi-layered diasporic cinema.
- Notable work: Chiens errants

Yasmine Kassari (born 3 October 1970) is a Moroccan film director, known for multi-layered diasporic cinema.

== Biography ==
Kassari moved to Paris as a teenager, where she graduated from high school and enrolled in a medical school. After studying medicine for two years, she abruptly decided to become a filmmaker and registered at INSAS (Institut National Supérieur des Arts du Spectacle) in Brussels. As a student she also worked for the production company Les films de la drève, where she was mentored by Jean-Jacques Andrien. In the 1990s, she directed three short films and in 2000, she directed the documentary Quand les hommes pleurent (When Men Cry) about the Moroccan immigration to Spain. Her 2004 film L'Enfant endormi (The Sleeping Child) received the Great Amber Award for Best Film and the Jury Prize for Best Film at the Bos'Art Film Festival.

== Filmography ==
- 1994: Le feutre noir (short film)
- 1995: Chiens errants (short film)
- 2000: Quand les hommes pleurent (documentary)
- 2001: Linda et Nadia (short film)
- 2004: L'Enfant endormi (The Sleeping Child)
