= Union Nationale des Femmes Marocaines =

The Union Nationale des Femmes du Maroc (UNFM) is a women's organization in Morocco, founded in 1969.

UNFM was founded with the support of king Hassan II 6 May 1969. The king wished to support women's rights after the dissolution of the Union Progressite des femmes Marocaines. The purpose of the UNFM was to campaign for the reform of women's status without challenging Islam. Princess Lalla Aicha of Morocco served as Honorary President in 1969-2011. The women's movement did not, however, win any significant victories before the 1990s.
