= Maysaloun Hamoud =

Hungarian-born Israeli film director (born 1982)

- ميسالون حمود
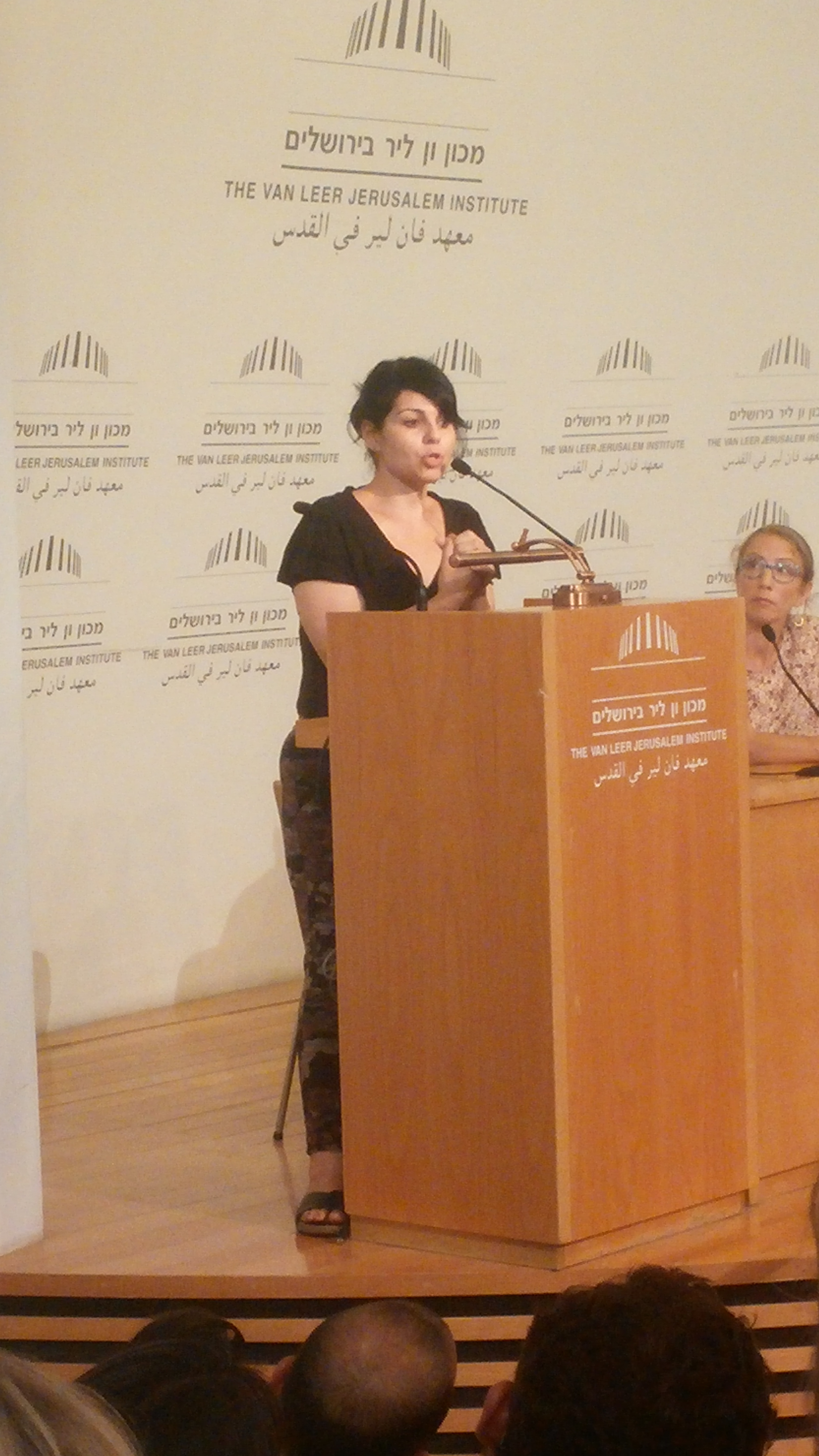
- Maysaloun Hamoud at the screening of In Between (Bar Bahar), at the Van Leer Institute in Jerusalem, July 2017
- Born: 1982 (age 43–44); Budapest, Hungary
- Citizenship: Israeli
- Education: Hebrew University of Jerusalem
- Occupation: Film director
- Years active: 2010–

Maysaloun Hamoud (Arabic: ميسالون حمود; born 1982 in Budapest) is a Hungarian-born film director who is a Palestinian citizen of Israel. Her film Bar Bahar (In Between) won the NETPAC Award for World or International Asian Film Premiere at the 2016 Toronto International Film Festival.

== Biography ==
Maysaloun Hamoud was born in Budapest in 1982 to Israeli parents of Palestinian heritage. She grew up in Budapest and then Beersheba, Israel. She read Middle Eastern studies at the Hebrew University of Jerusalem. In 2004, introduced to cinema by an animator friend, she joined the Minshar School of Art in Tel-Aviv to study film.

Hamoud is an Israeli citizen.

== Career ==
Hamoud became a teacher after her graduation.

In 2010, Hamoud directed Sense of Morning, a short film inspired by Palestinian poet Mahmoud Darwish's Memory of Forgetfulness (1987). In the film, the poet strives to continue his daily routine of coffee and cigarettes on the last day of the siege of Beirut.

At the Minshar School of Art, one of Hamoud's teachers was Shlomi Elkabetz, an Israeli film director. Hamoud developed her idea for the feature film Bar Bahar under his guidance and support. She has said that, according to him, her film is a sort of extension of Elkabetz's trilogy To Take a Wife (2004), Shiva (2007) and Gett: The Trial of Viviane Amsalem (2014).

== Works ==
- (2010) Sense of Morning (short film)
- (2016) In Between (feature film)
- (2021) Nafas (short film)

== Honors ==
Hamoud's film Bar Bahar (In Between) won the NETPAC Award for World or International Asian Film Premiere at the 2016 Toronto International Film Festival. It also won three prizes, including the Sebastiane Award at the San Sebastián International Film Festival in 2016.

In 2017, Hamoud received the Women in Motion Young Talents Award at the Cannes Film Festival from Isabelle Huppert.

== See also ==
- List of female film and television directors
- List of LGBT-related films directed by women
