= Simon Abkarian =

French-Armenian actor and playwright (born 1962)

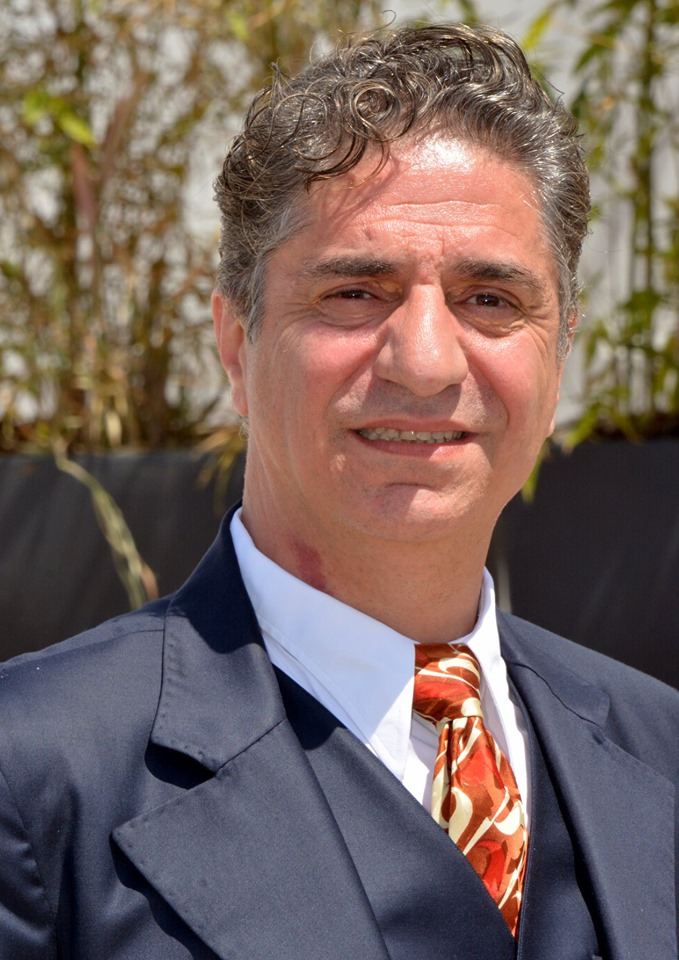
- Abkarian at the 2019 Cannes Film Festival
- Born: 5 March 1962 (age 64); Gonesse, Val-d'Oise, France
- Occupations: Actor, playwright
- Years active: 1977–present

Simon Abkarian (French pronunciation: [simɔ̃ abkaʁjɑ̃]; born 5 March 1962) is a French-Armenian film, television and stage actor and playwright.

He won the 2001 Molière Award for Best Actor for Beast on the Moon (Une bête sur la lune). In 2006 Abkarian starred as the James Bond villain Alex Dimitrios in Casino Royale. In 2026 he portrayed General Charles de Gaulle in the two-part epic biographical drama De Gaulle, one of the most expensive French films of all time. The film premiered at the 2026 Cannes Film Festival, during which Abkarian received a standing ovation for his performance.

== Life and career ==
Born in Gonesse, a Parisian suburb in Val-d'Oise (then in Seine-et-Oise), of Armenian descent, Abkarian spent his childhood in Lebanon. He then moved to Los Angeles, where he joined an Armenian theatre company managed by Gerald Papazian.

He returned to France in 1985, settling in Paris. He took classes at the Acting International school, then he joined Ariane Mnouchkine's Théâtre du Soleil and played, among others, in The Terrible but Unfinished Story of Norodom Sihanouk, King of Cambodia (L'Histoire terrible mais inachevée de Norodom Sihanouk, roi du Cambodge) by Hélène Cixous, and in the House of Atreus four-play cycle by Aeschylus.

Abkarian left the Théâtre du Soleil in 1993. In 2001 he starred in Beast on the Moon (Une bête sur la lune) by Richard Kalinoski, directed by Irina Brook, a play about the life of a survivor of the Armenian genocide, a role which won him critical acclaim and the Molière Award for Best Actor.

His first roles in cinema were proposed by French filmmaker Cédric Klapisch, who asked him to play in several of his movies, notably in Chacun cherche son chat (When the Cat is Away, 1996) and in Not For, or Against (Ni pour ni contre (bien au contraire), 2003).

He was featured in Sally Potter's Yes (2004), in which he played the lead role.

Abkarian then played Mehdi Ben Barka in the thriller J'ai vu tuer Ben Barka by Serge Le Péron, about the kidnapping and the murder of the leader of the Moroccan opposition. He then played in Prendre Femme by Ronit Elkabetz which won him several acting awards. Playing different roles and in different genres, he was featured in the adventure Zaïna, cavalière de l'Atlas by Bourlem Guerdjou, in the comedy Le Démon de midi by Marie-Pascale Osterrieth. He has also appeared in Atom Egoyan's Ararat (2002), he was Albert in Almost Peaceful (2004) by French director Michel Deville, and he was featured in Your Dreams (2005) by Denis Thybaud. He was featured as Sahak in the 2005 thriller Les Mauvais Joueurs (The Gamblers) by Frédéric Balekdjian. In 2006 Abkarian played the role of villain Alex Dimitrios in the James Bond film Casino Royale, the first instalment with Daniel Craig in the title role. The character is an arms dealer working against Bond.

He was also the voice of Ebi in the French version of the animated feature Persepolis (2007). Abkarian played the role of the Armenian poet Missak Manouchian in The Army of Crime (2010) by Robert Guédiguian, a French filmmaker based in Marseille, who is also of Armenian parentage.

He played Dariush Bakhshi, the Iranian Special Consul, in the BBC drama Spooks (MI-5). In 2012, he played the role of a drug-dealing Afghan army colonel in the Canal+ series Kaboul Kitchen.

He had the lead role in a two-part biopic of Charles de Gaulle directed by Antonin Baudry, which filmed in 2023 and 2024. One of the most expensive French films of all time and dubbed "a work of rare and nearly unprecedented ambition", it premiered at the 2026 Cannes Film Festival, during which Abkarian received a standing ovation for his performance.

== Selected filmography ==
- Riens du tout (1992) – danseur grec (Greek dancer)
- Ana El Awan (1994) – Camille
- When the Cat's Away (1996) – Carlos
- Le dernier des pélicans (1996)
- Le silence de Rak (1997) – le second consommateur (the second consumer)
- J'irai au paradis car l'enfer est ici (1997) – Simon
- Tempête dans un verre d'eau (1997)
- Lila Lili (1999) – Simon
- Ararat (2002) – Arshile Gorky
- Almost Peaceful (2002) – Albert
- The Truth About Charlie (2002) – Lieutenant Dessalines
- Aram (2002) – Aram
- La légende de Parva (2003) – le swami (voice)
- Not For, or Against (2003) – Freddy Karparian dit Lecarpe
- To Take a Wife (2004) – Eliyahu
- Yes (2004) – He
- Gamblers (2005) – Sahak
- Dans tes rêves (2005) – Wilson
- The Demon Stirs (2005) – Julien Cestac
- Zaïna, cavalière de l'Atlas (2005) – Omar
- J'ai vu tuer Ben Barka (2005) – Mehdi Ben Barka
- Petites révélations (2006)
- Le Voyage en Arménie (2006) – Sarkis Arabian
- Hier encore (2006) – Simon Tabet
- The Serpent (2006) – Sam
- Casino Royale (2006) – Alex Dimitrios
- New délire (2007) – Gunter (voice)
- Persepolis (2007) – Mr. Satrapi – Marjane's father (voice)
- Trivial (2007) – Pierre
- Rendition (2007) – Said Abdel Aziz
- Shiva (2008) – Eliau
- Un monde à nous (2008) – l'oncle de Noé (voice)
- Khamsa (2008) – le père (the father)
- Secret défense (2009) – Al Barad
- Musée haut, musée bas (2008) – Gilles Paulin
- Le Chant des mariées (2008) – Raoul
- Rage (2009) – Merlin
- The Army of Crime (2009) – Missak Manouchian
- Suite parlée (2010) – 'Le masque'
- Turk's Head (2010) – le veuf (the widow)
- Des Force (2011) – Jimi Weiss
- Kaboul Kitchen (2012–2017, TV Series) – Colonel Amanullah
- Zarafa (2012) – Hassan (voice)
- Zero Dark Thirty (2012) – Detainee on Monitor
- Recon: A Filmmaker's Quest (2012)
- Les invincibles (2013) – Nino Lorcy
- The Marchers (2013) – Farid's father
- Angélique (2013) – lawyer (advocate) François Desgrez
- Gett – The Trial of Viviane Amsallem (2014) – Elisha Amsalem
- Colt 45 (2014) – Commandant Luc Denard
- The Cut (2014) – Krikor
- Pseudonym (2014) – Monsieur
- 1915 (2015) – Simon
- Don't Tell Me the Boy Was Mad (2015) – Hovannès Alexandrian
- Chouf (2016) – Le Libanais
- La Mécanique de l'ombre (2016) – Gerfaut
- Djam (2017) – Kakourgos
- Overdrive (2017) – Jacomo Morier
- The Sonata (2018) – Charles Vernais
- Rebelles (2019) – Simon Bénéké
- The Swallows of Kabul (2019) – Atiq (voice)
- The Audition (2019) – Philippe Bronsky
- Someone, Somewhere (2019) – l'épicier (the grocer)
- Restless (2022) – Commissioner Antoine Marelli
- De Gaulle (2026) – General Charles de Gaulle

== Honours ==
- Knight of the Ordre national du Mérite (2010)
- Commander of the Ordre des Arts et des Lettres (2021)
