= Avner Yashar =

Israeli architect (born 1956)

- אבנר ישר
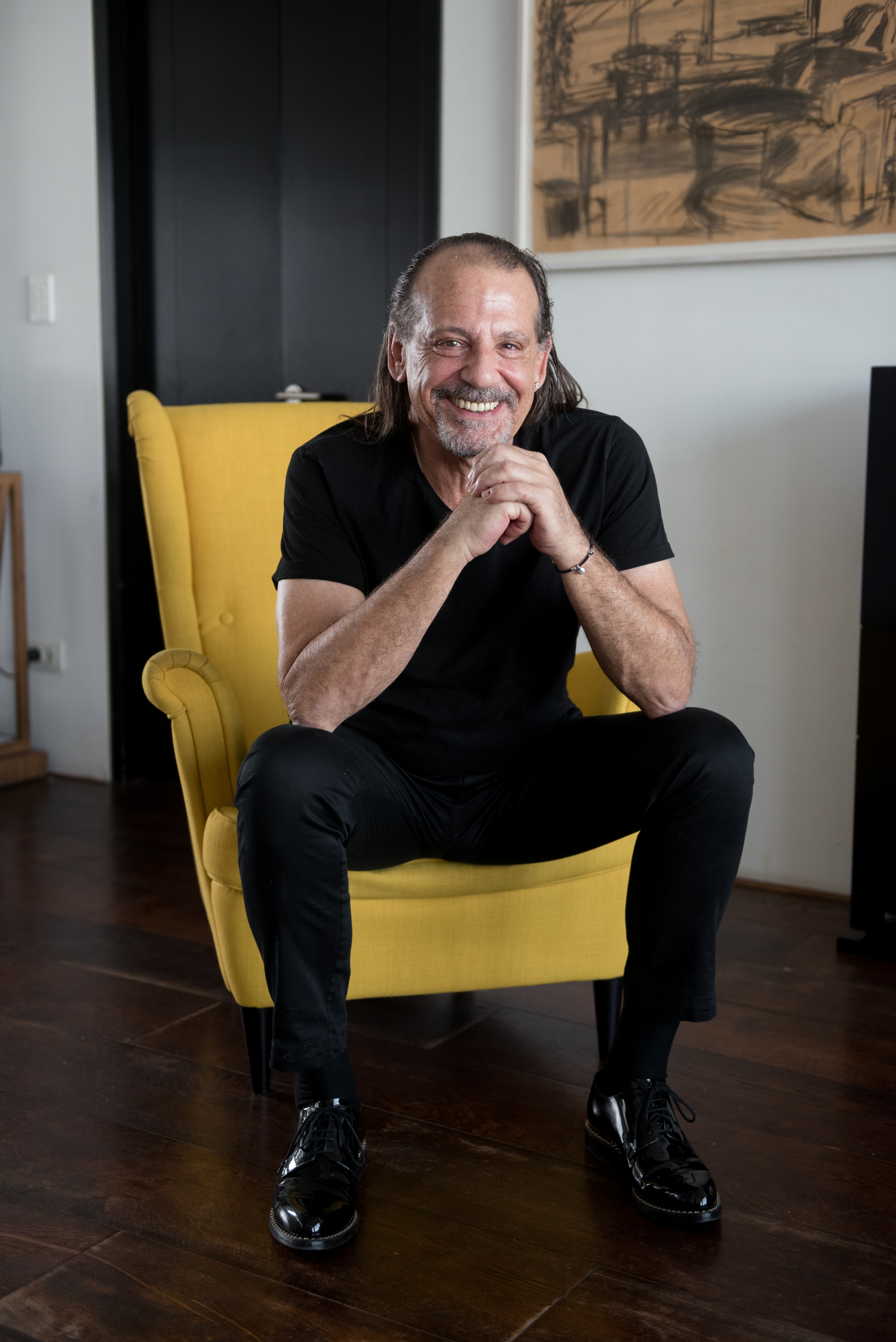
- Yashar in 2019
- Born: 13 June 1956 (age 70); Tel Aviv, Israel
- Education: Bezalel Academy of Arts and Design
- Occupation: Architect
- Title: Owner of Yashar Architects
- Spouses: Michal Bahir (m. 1983; div. 1998) Ronit Elkabetz (m. 2010; died 2016) Adi Iny Yashar (m. 2020)
- Children: 7
- Parents: Yitzhak Yashar (father); Rema Samsonov (mother)

Avner Yashar (Hebrew: אבנר ישר; born 13 June 1956) is an Israeli architect and the owner of Yashar Architects.

== Biography ==
Avner Yashar was born in Tel Aviv in 1956. His mother was Rema Samsonov, an opera singer, a professor at the Beit Zvi School for the Performing Arts and Honorary Citizen of Tel Aviv, and his father was the architect Yitzhak Yashar, winner of the Rokach Prize and Rechter Prize, who designed many buildings in Israel such as the Tel Aviv Museum of Art, Mexico Building at Tel Aviv University, David Towers and Dizengoff Center.

In the late 1970s, Yashar began studying psychology and philosophy at Tel Aviv University. In 1980 he switched to architecture at the Bezalel Academy of Arts and Design in Jerusalem. He continued his studies at the Technion, Israel Institute of Technology in Haifa, where he graduated in 1986. As a student he began working in his father's office.

== Career ==
Since 1997, Yashar has been the chief architect and owner of Yashar Architects. The firm currently employs 87 workers, including 76 architects and 5 partners.

In 2002, Yashar's office designed the Tzamarot Ayalon neighborhood in Tel Aviv. The plan included four high-rise buildings: One Tower, W-Tower, W Prime and ROM Tower, the tallest in the neighborhood.

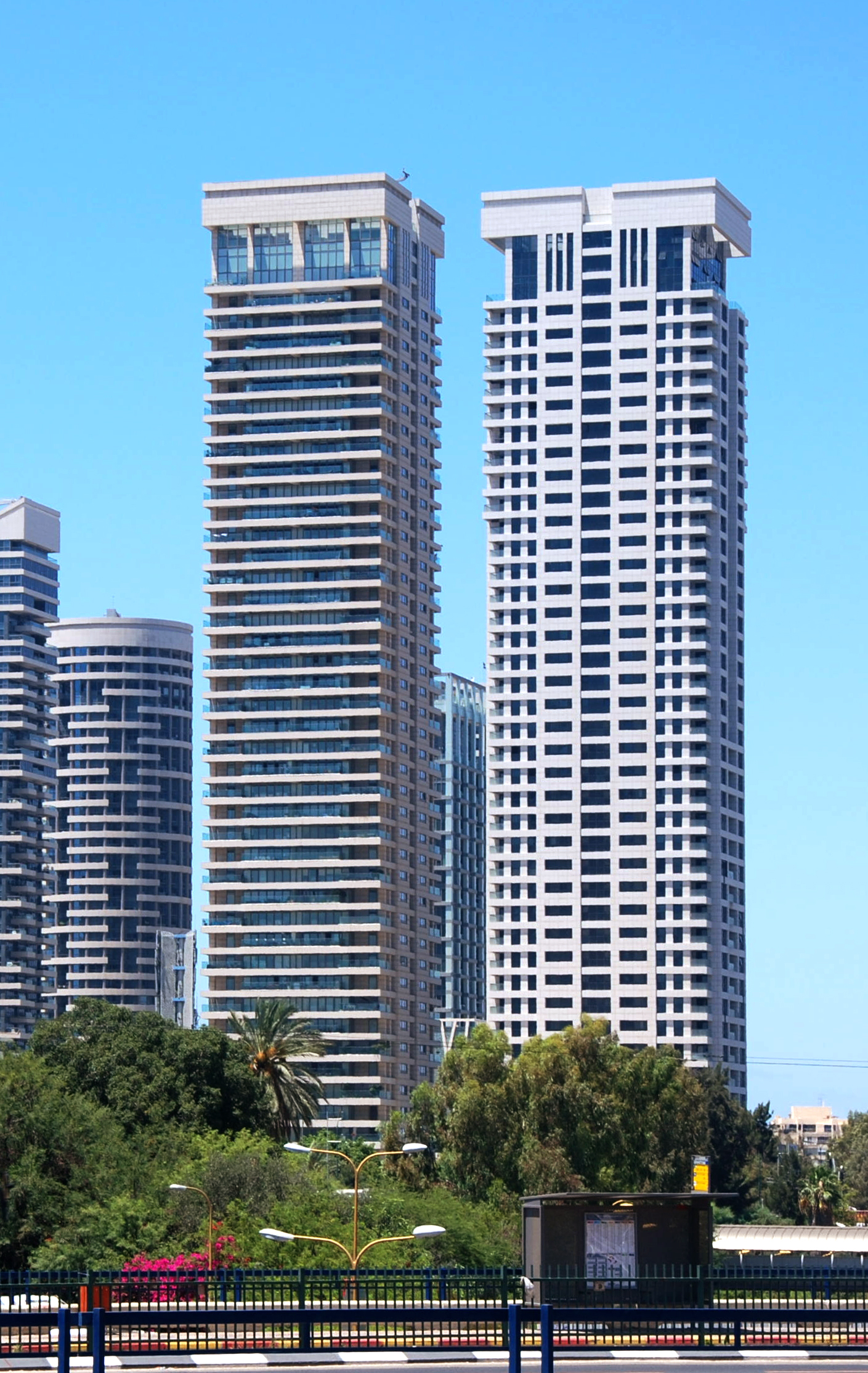
W Tower and W Prime Tower, Park Tzameret, Tel Aviv, Israel

In 2009 Avner won a competition for the design of the Metropolitan Development Authority building in Hyderabad city, India after defeating 10 firms (Indian and international). Of the four firms which reached the finals of the competition, Yashar's project was selected.

In 2011, Yashar became the first Israeli architect to win an Award of Excellence in the CTBUH (Council on Tall Buildings and Urban Habitat) International Competition for Skyscrapers with two high-rise towers that were designed by him.

In 2017, after planning joint projects such as Totzeret HaAretz Towers (TOHA) in Tel Aviv and Bay 51 in Haifa, he established a joint firm with Israeli-Londoner Architect and designer Ron Arad, named AradYashar.

In 2021, the ToHa building, designed by Ron Arad and Avner Yashar, won the CTBUH award for "Best Tall Office Building," and "Best Tall Building Middle East and Africa".

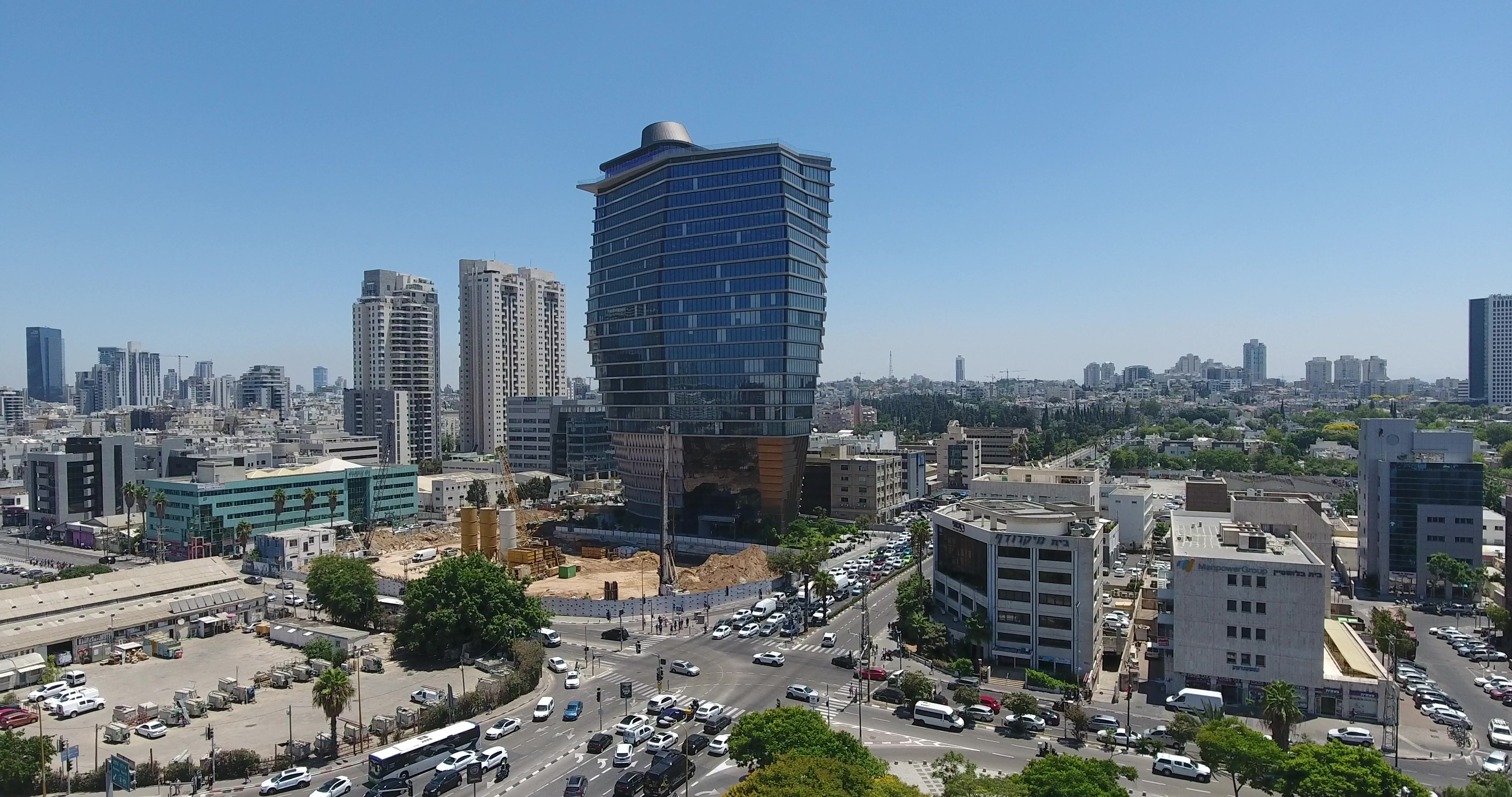
ToHa (Tozeret Ha Aretz) Tower, Tel Aviv, July 2019

In 2018, his firm won two first prize awards in an excellence competition sponsored by the Israeli Construction and Infrastructure Industry. Tel Aviv's "Bezalel Market" project won the "Luxury Residential Complex" category, and Herzliya's "Vitania House - Fedco" project won the "Best Office Building" category.

== Views ==
Yashar is a supporter of densification, characterized by building more skyscrapers and mixed-use projects. He is perceived as a leader in shaping the landscape of high-rise towers of Tel Aviv.

In 2014, Yashar taught at the Tel Aviv University's School of Architecture. That year, he published a study examining the urban connectivity of Tel Aviv. He proposed building main arteries throughout the city and more bridges over the Ayalon highway to further connect the separated eastern and western sections of the city.

In keeping with his architectural ideology of urban mixed-use development, he designed: Rothschild 1 Tower, Da Vinci Towers, and Sumile Towers in Tel Aviv, W Tower, W Prime and ROM in the Tzameret Park neighborhood, as well as the Diamond Exchange District Towers in the city of Ramat Gan, which will be the largest office complex in Israel and will include a 77, 88 and 120 story Towers. The 120 story tower, which will rise half a kilometer, will be the tallest skyscraper in Israel, and amongst the tallest in the world. In addition, Avner designed a large number of residential and mixed-use complexes, including: The Wholesale Market complex (Gindi TLV) which is the largest residential complex in Tel Aviv, Bezalel Market complex and the Aliya Market complex (Florentine Village) in Tel Aviv. Yashar also developed a mixed-use master plan for the Yoseftal Intersection area in Holon and a large residential plan at the corner of Dafna and Arlozorov streets in Tel Aviv.

In 2017, a lecture he gave at the Bezalel Academy of Arts and Design, "Residential towers as a way out of a crisis," was included in the book "Dreaming of a home - The ongoing housing crisis and high-rise construction in Israel" edited by Joshua Guttman and published by Resling Publishers.

== Personal life ==
In 1983, Yashar married Michal Bahir and they have three children: Tut, Tara and Thai. They divorced in 1998.

In 2010, he married Ronit Elkabetz, actress and director, and in 2012 she gave birth to Shalimar and Omri. In 2016, Avner Yashar was widowed after Ronit's death following a long illness with lung cancer.

In 2020, Avner married Architect Adi Iny Yashar. In 2021 she gave birth to Raphael Aharon, and in 2023 to their second son, Uri. The couple lives in Tel Aviv.

Avner has lived in Tel Aviv all his life.

== Social activity and community contributions ==
In 2013, after his father died, Avner initiated the "Yashar Workshop" and the "Yashar Prize", in collaboration with the Tel Aviv University School of Architecture. The "Yashar Prize" is a prize money awarded to an Architecture graduate student who has excelled in his/her degree project.

In 2017, after the death of his wife Ronit Elkabetz, Avner partnered with Ronit's brother Shlomi Elkabetz to initiate a Scholarship in Ronit's name, named "Fearless." This scholarship, which is also supported by the "Sapir Academic College" as well as several Film organizations, provides financial funding to daring and creative artists in the film-making field.

In 2019 the construction of the Oranit Cancer Patient Guest Home in Petah Tikva was completed. The center, which was founded by the Bracha and Motti Zisser Foundation, was designed by Avner. The building's construction, which stretched for a decade, was supervised, completely voluntarily, by Yashar Architects.

== Buildings designed by Yashar ==
Date	Project name	Location
2002	Tzameret Park project - One Tower, W Tower, W Prime, ROM (the tallest in the neighborhood)	Tel Aviv
2008	Rothschild 1 Tower	Tel Aviv
2009	Metropolitan Development Authority building	Hyderabad, India
2010	Bezalel Market complex	Tel Aviv
2011	Lieber Tower	Tel Aviv
2015	Wholesale Market complex – Gindi TLV	Tel Aviv
2015	Evacuation-Construction plan (corner of Dafna and Arlozorov streets)	Tel Aviv
2017	Totzeret HaAretz Towers (TOHA) in collaboration with Ron Arad, which won a CBTUH award	Tel Aviv
2018	Aliya Market complex	Tel Aviv
2019	Tower 120. Designed to be the tallest in Israel (about half a kilometer tall).	Ramat Gan
