= Not For, or Against =

Not For, or Against (Quite the Contrary)
- Theatrical release poster
- Ni pour, ni contre (bien au contraire)
- Directed by: Cédric Klapisch
- Written by: Cédric Klapisch; Santiago Amigorena; Alexis Galmot
- Produced by: Aïssa Djabri; Farid Lahouassa; Manuel Munz
- Starring: Marie Gillain; Vincent Elbaz
- Cinematography: Bruno Delbonnel
- Edited by: Yannick Kergoat
- Music by: Charlie O. Mathieu Dury; Sylvia Howard; Loïk Dury
- Production companies: Vertigo Productions; M6 Films; Ce qui me meut
- Distributed by: BAC Films
- Release date: 5 March 2003
- Running time: 111 minutes
- Country: France
- Language: French
- Budget: €9.9 million
- Box office: $2.2 million

Not For, or Against (Quite the Contrary) (original title: Ni pour, ni contre (bien au contraire)) is a 2003 French crime drama film directed and co-written by Cédric Klapisch. It stars Marie Gillain and Vincent Elbaz.

== Cast ==
- Marie Gillain as Caty
- Vincent Elbaz as Jean
- Simon Abkarian as Lecarpe
- Zinedine Soualem as Mouss
- Dimitri Storoge as Loulou
- Natacha Lindinger as Caprice
- Jocelyn Lagarrigue as Gilles
- Diane Kruger as a call girl
- Michaël Abiteboul as Bernard
- Camille Natta as Liz
- Cédric Klapisch as a journalist
