= Lola (2006 film) =

- Spanish: Lo que sé de Lola
- French: Ce que je sais de Lola
- Directed by: Javier Rebollo
- Screenplay by: Javier Rebollo; Lola Mayo
- Starring: Michaël Abiteboul; Lola Dueñas; Carmen Machi; Lucienne Deschamps
- Cinematography: Santiago Racaj
- Edited by: Ángel Hernández Zoido
- Production companies: Lazennec & Associes; Lolita Films; Malvarrosa Media
- Release dates: September 2006 (San Sebastián); 29 September 2006 (Spain); 1 August 2007 (France)
- Countries: Spain; France
- Languages: French; Spanish

Lola or What I Know About Lola (Spanish: Lo que sé de Lola; French: Ce que je sais de Lola) is a 2006 Spanish-French film directed by Javier Rebollo which stars Michaël Abiteboul and Lola Dueñas as Léon and Lola alongside Carmen Machi and Lucienne Deschamps .

== Plot ==
Set in Paris, the plot concerns Léon, an asocial man living with his mother who starts observing newcomer Lola, a vivacious Spaniard.

== Cast ==
- Michaël Abiteboul as Léon
- Lola Dueñas as Lola
- Carmen Machi as Carmen
- Lucienne Deschamps as Madre de Léon

== Production ==
The screenplay was penned by Javier Rebollo and Lola Mayo. A Spanish-French co-production, the film was produced by a Lazennec & Associes, Lolita Films and Malvarrosa Media with the participation of TVE and RTVV.

== Release ==
The film premiered at the San Sebastián International Film Festival in September 2006. It also screened at the 50th London Film Festival in 2006, and at the 8th Seoul International Film Festival in 2007. It opened in Spanish theatres on 29 September 2006, and it did so in French theatres on 1 August 2007. Santiago Racaj was responsible for cinematography whereas Ángel Hernández Zoido took over film editing.

== Reception ==
Javier Ocaña of El País pointed out that "by means of fixed shots, ultra-orthodox framing and a scrupulous control of the point of view", Rebollo tells us, as if the film were a documentary about animals, about "human fauna".

Mirito Torreiro of Fotogramas rated the film 3 out of 5 stars, praising the "coherence with which it presents a story of voyeurism without moral alibis", while citing the "(necessary) weariness that runs through some moments of the plot" as the worst thing about it.

Jonathan Holland of Variety deemed the film to be "a meticulously constructed and ambitious if somewhat ponderous take on loneliness", "making for an interesting but ultimately uninvolving experience", in which Lola Dueñas is "easily the best thing" about it.

== Accolades ==
Year	Award	Category	Nominee(s)	Result	Ref.
2006	50th London Film Festival	FIPRESCI Jury Award		Won	
2007	21st Goya Awards	Best New Director	Javier Rebollo	Nominated	

== See also ==
- List of Spanish films of 2006
- List of French films of 2007
