= Michaël Abiteboul =

French actor

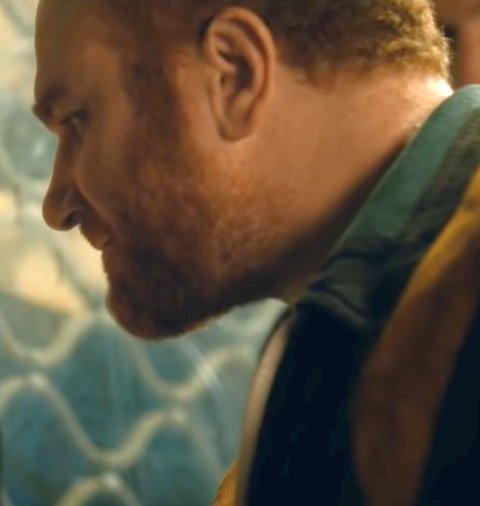
- Abiteboul in the trailer for the film “Le Père Noël”
- Born: France
- Occupation: Actor
- Years active: 1990–present
- Website: http://www.michaelabiteboul.com/

Michaël Abiteboul is a French actor.

== Filmography ==
Year	Title	Role	Director	Notes
1993	Le château des oliviers	Robert's friend	Nicolas Gessner	TV mini-series
2000	Murderous Maids	Etienne	Jean-Pierre Denis	
2001	Alias Betty	Milo	Claude Miller	
2001	Muno	Raphaël	Bouli Lanners	Short
2001	Confessions dans un bain	Mathieu	Marc Gibaja	Short
2001	Permission moisson	Mathieu Pittas	Didier Grousset	TV movie
2003	Time of the Wolf	Armed man	Michael Haneke	
2003	Not For, or Against	Bernard	Cédric Klapisch	
2003	En territoire indien	Jean-Denis	Lionel Epp	
2003	La peur du bourreau	Manu	Soazic Veillon	Short
2003	Trois jeunes tambours	The father	Nicolas Miard	Short
2003	Lagardère	The drunk man	Henri Helman	TV movie
2004	Crimson Rivers II: Angels of the Apocalypse	The cop	Olivier Dahan	
2004	Les parallèles	Maurice	Nicolas Saada	Short
2004	Désirée	The lover	Véronique Dossetto & Nadja-Rebecca Warasteh	Short
2005	Manderlay	Thomas	Lars von Trier	
2005	How Much Do You Love Me?	François's colleague	Bertrand Blier	
2005	Ultranova	Phil	Bouli Lanners	
2005	Le temps meurtrier	Marc Surgère	Philippe Monnier	TV movie
2006	Lo que sé de Lola	Léon	Javier Rebollo	
2006	Les fragments d'Antonin	Masson	Gabriel Le Bomin	
2006	Gaspard le bandit	Claude Portanier	Benoît Jacquot	TV movie
2006	Turbulences	Flabert	Nicolas Hourès	TV mini-series
2007	The Key	Thierry	Guillaume Nicloux	
2007	Diane, femme flic	Alex Borsky	Marc Angelo	TV series (1 episode)
2007	La commune	Bruno Kieffer	Philippe Triboit	TV series (1 episode)
2008	A Simple Heart	Fabu	Marion Laine	
2008	Passe-passe	Redhair	Tonie Marshall	
2008	Contre nature	François	Julien Despaux	Short
2008	West Stern	Jack	Maria Larrea	Short
2008	Temps Mort	Douglas	James L. Frachon	TV mini-series
2008	Chez Maupassant	Isidore	Claude Chabrol	TV series (1 episode)
2008	Louis la brocante	Ulysse	Michel Favart	TV series (1 episode)
2008	Doom-Doom	Killer M	Laurent Abitbol & Nicolas Mongin	TV series (3 episodes)
2008–2016	Nicolas Le Floch	Charles-Henri Sanson	Nicolas Picard, Philippe Bérenger, ...	TV series (12 episodes)
2009	Father of My Children	The banker	Mia Hansen-Løve	
2009	Mensch	Youval	Steve Suissa	
2009	Je viens	The director	Teddy Lussi-Modeste	Short
2009	Les livres qui tuent	Samy	Denys Granier-Deferre	TV movie
2010	Belle Épine	Gérard	Rebecca Zlotowski	
2010	Two Sunny Days	Marcel	Ognjen Sviličić	
2010	Le chat noir	Anthelme Lanion	Tristan Convert	Short
2010	Sibylle	The man	Naël Marandin	Short
2010	Histoires de vies	Beucé	Nicolas Tackian	TV series (1 episode)
2011	Let My People Go !	Ézechiel	Mikael Buch	
2011	Alexis Ivanovitch vous êtes mon héros		Guillaume Gouix	Short
2011	Nuts	The killer	Thomas Lélu	Short
2011	Entre-deux	Max	Pascal Barbier & Lucas Fabiani	Short
2011	La grève des femmes	Ludo	Stéphane Kappes	TV movie
2011	Rani	Father Barthélémy	Arnaud Sélignac	TV series (3 episodes)
2012	Happiness Never Comes Alone	Lionel Ronssin	James Huth	
2012	Superstar	Martin's colleague	Xavier Giannoli	
2012	Simon Killer	Jean	Antonio Campos	
2012	Alyah	The shalliah	Elie Wajeman	
2012	Nuts	François's brother	Yann Coridian	
2012	Amitiés sincères	François	Stéphan Archinard & François Prévôt-Leygonie	
2012	Tu honoreras ta mère et ta mère	Fabien	Brigitte Roüan	
2012	La disparition	Renan Lavil	Jean-Xavier de Lestrade	TV movie
2012	La baie d'Alger	Marco	Merzak Allouache	TV movie
2012	Mange	Louis	Virgile Bramly & Julia Ducournau	TV movie
2013	It Boy	Simon	David Moreau	
2013	La vie domestique	Grégory	Isabelle Czajka	
2013	La femme qui flottait	Raymond	Thibault Lang Willar	Short
2013	Océan	Serge	Emmanuel Laborie	Short
2013	Agit Pop	David Karbas	Nicolas Pariser	Short
2013	J'en rêve encore	Stéphane	Olivier Rosenberg	Short
2013	La dernière campagne	Kevin	Bernard Stora	TV movie
2013	Crime d'État	Yann Gaillard	Pierre Aknine	TV movie
2013	Fais pas ci, fais pas ça	Pedro	Laurent Dussaux	TV series (1 episode)
2013	Maison Close	Kertel	Jérôme Cornuau & Mabrouk El Mechri	TV series (8 episodes)
2014	Le Père Noël	The bogeyman	Alexandre Coffre	
2014	Tiens-toi droite	Damien	Katia Lewkowicz	
2014	Les corps étrangers	Pierre	Laura Wandel	Short
2014	Jusqu'au dernier	Leclerc	François Velle	TV mini-series
2014	Ceux de 14	Souesmes	Olivier Schatzky	TV series (6 episodes)
2015	Courted	Lawyer Jourd'hui	Christian Vincent	
2015	Daddy or Mommy	Paul	Martin Bourboulon	
2015	Malaterra	Ange Antonetti	Laurent Herbiet & Jean-Xavier de Lestrade	TV mini-series
2015	Le passager	Captain Crosnier	Jérôme Cornuau	TV mini-series
2015	The Returned	Milan Garrel	Fabrice Gobert & Frédéric Goupil	TV series (8 episodes)
2015-2016	The Bureau	Mémé	Éric Rochant, Mathieu Demy, ...	TV series (18 episodes)
2016	L'invitation	Chewbacca	Michaël Cohen	
2016	Daddy or Mommy 2	Paul	Martin Bourboulon	
2016	Pa Fuera	Corto	Vica Zagreba	Short
2016	Après moi le bonheur	David	Nicolas Cuche	TV movie
2017	Les hommes du feu	Xavier	Pierre Jolivet	
2017	Pour la galerie	Hyppolite Marchandeau	Philippe Safir	Short
2017	On l'appelait Ruby	Sabre	Laurent Tuel	TV movie
2017	Juste un regard	Hubert Caillard	Ludovic Colbeau-Justin	TV mini-series
2019	L'intervention	Georges Campère	Fred Grivois	
2019	The Shiny Shrimps (Les crevettes pailletées)	Cédric	Maxime Govare & Cédric Le Gallo	
2019	Les Bracelets Rouges	Doctor Meyer	Nicolas Cuche & Christophe Campos	TV series (2 episodes)
2022	Good People	Philippe Blanquart	Stéphane Bergmans, Matthieu Donck, Benjamin d'Aoust	TV series (4 episodes)

== Theatre ==
Year	Title	Author	Director
1990	Les Fourberies de Scapin	Molière	
1990	Prométhée dissident	Alain Simon	Alain Simon
1992	La fille du bar et du cheval	Gérard Gélas	Gérard Gélas
1993	One Flew Over the Cuckoo's Nest	Dale Wasserman	
1993	La lune bleue	Carson McCullers	
1993	A Midsummer Night's Dream	William Shakespeare	
1994-95	Bingo	Edward Bond	Alain Milianti
1996	Caligula	Albert Camus	Renaud Mouillac
1996	Bettina	Carlo Goldoni	Jacques Mornas
1997	La Fausse Suivante	Pierre de Marivaux	Paul Desveaux
1998	Il vero amico	Carlo Goldoni	Fabrice Cals
1998	Saturday, Sunday and Monday	Eduardo De Filippo	Robert Cantarella
1999	Romeo and Juliet	William Shakespeare	Stuart Seide
1999	The Trial of Joan of Arc of Proven, 1431	Bertolt Brecht	Alain Milianti
1999	Le festin avant la peste	Louis-Ferdinand Céline	Alain Milianti
2000	Les Fausses Confidences	Pierre de Marivaux	Alain Milianti
2002	Amphitryon	Molière	Stuart Seide
2002	The Alexandria Quartet	Lawrence Durrell	Stuart Seide
2003	Le Partage de Midi	Paul Claudel	Jean-Christophe Mast
2003	Surprise et conséquences	Sandrine Martin	Bruno Chiche
2003	Lisa 1 et 2	Fanny Mentré	Fanny Mentré
