= In Between (2016 film) =

2016 film by Maysaloun Hamoud

- Israeli theatrical release poster
- Arabic: بَر بَحَر
- Hebrew: לא פה, לא שם
- Directed by: Maysaloun Hamoud
- Written by: Maysaloun Hamoud
- Produced by: Shlomi Elkabetz
- Starring: Mouna Hawa; Sana Jammelieh; Shaden Kanboura; Mahmud Shalaby; Aiman Sohel Daw; Riyad Sliman; Firas Suleiman Nassar; Ahlam Canaan; Henry Andrawes; Khawlah Hag-Debsy; Suhel Haddad
- Cinematography: Itay Gross
- Edited by: Lev Golster; Nili Feller
- Music by: MG Saad
- Production companies: En Compagnie des Lamas; 2BG Films
- Distributed by: Paname Distribution (France)
- Release dates: 11 September 2016 (TIFF); 5 January 2017 (Israel); 12 April 2017 (France)
- Running time: 96 minutes
- Countries: Israel; France
- Language: Arabic
- Box office: $1.7 million

In Between (Arabic: بَر بَحَر, romanized: Bar Baḥr, lit. 'Land, Sea'; Hebrew: לא פה, לא שם, lit. 'Not Here, Not There') is a 2016 drama film written and directed by Maysaloun Hamoud, about three women of Palestinian heritage sharing a flat in Tel Aviv. An international co-production between Israel and France, the film depicts three young Israeli-Arab women living in liberal Tel Aviv, their struggles with the rule-bound Arab world, the inequality of Israeli society, and their desire to free themselves.

== Plot ==
The three women share an apartment in Tel Aviv. Laila, a secular Muslim lawyer from Nazareth; Salma, a Christian Arab DJ and bartender from Tarshiha; and Nour, a devout Muslim student from Umm al-Fahm. Each of the three women experiences, in her own way, alienation and detachment from the traditional society they come from and the frameworks their families prefer for them.

Laila struggles to find a partner for a serious relationship who is willing to introduce her to his family without demanding she change her lifestyle. Salma hides her lesbian identity from her family, and Nour is trapped in an engagement to a man she does not love and who does not support her personal aspirations. Even in the heart of Tel Aviv's liberal society, where the three have found a degree of refuge, they struggle to feel a sense of belonging due to their Arab identity.

== Cast ==
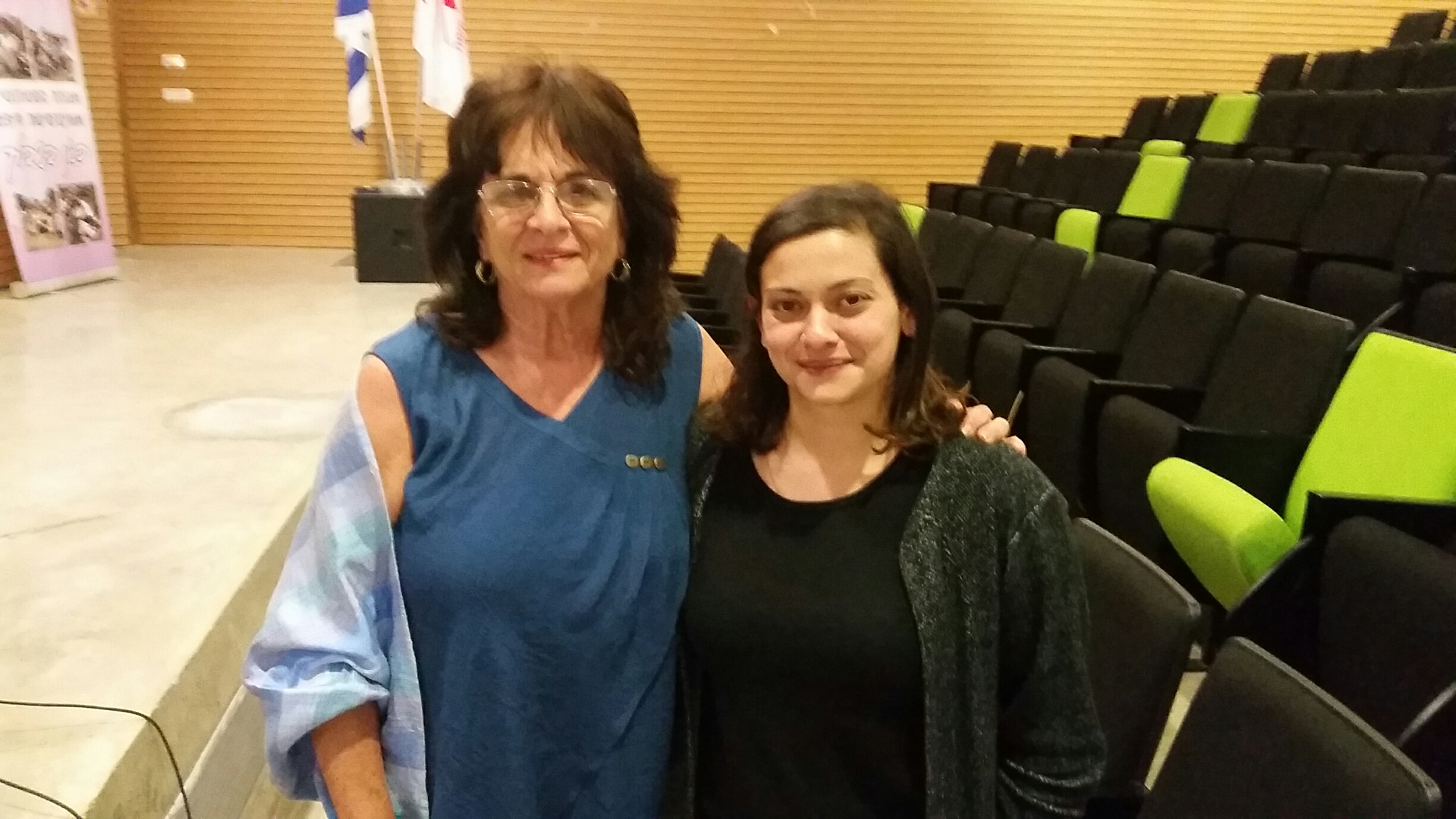
Shaden Kanboura on the right with Ofra Rimon at the screening of the film In Between at the University of Haifa, 22 May 2017

- Mouna Hawa as Layla (or Leila), a criminal defence lawyer originally from Nazareth, whose family is secular Muslim
- Shaden Kanboura as Nour, a religious Muslim woman studying computer science at Tel Aviv University
- Sana Jammelieh as Salma, a lesbian DJ from a Christian family
- Mahmud Shalaby as Ziad, Leila's long-term boyfriend
- Henry Andrawes as Wissam, Nour's very religious fiancé

== Production ==
Producer Shlomi Elkabetz and writer-director Maysaloun Hamoud brought the project to Jerusalem's "Pitch Point" in 2015, where it won two prizes: the Turkish YAPIMLAB Award and the IFP Award. The film was funded by the Israel Film Fund.

== Release ==
In Between had its world premiere in the Contemporary World Cinema section of the Toronto International Film Festival on 11 September 2016, and was screend at the Haifa International Film Festival the following month. The film was released in theaters in Israel on 5 January 2017, while Paname Distribution released it in France on 12 April 2017 under the title Je danserai si je veux (lit. 'I Will Dance if I Want'). In the United States, Film Movement opened the film in theaters in New York City on 5 January 2018 and in Los Angeles on 12 January, followed by a national rollout.

== Reception ==
=== Critical response ===
On the review aggregator website Rotten Tomatoes, the film holds an approval rating of 98% based on 66 reviews. The website's critics consensus reads, "In Between takes a light yet nuanced approach to dramatizing complex, timely themes, further enriched by outstanding cinematography and powerful performances." On Metacritic, which assigns a weighted average score out of 100 to reviews from mainstream critics, the film received an average score of 78 based on 19 reviews, indicating "generally favorable" reviews.

Yael (Nitzan) Rubinstein wrote in her review of the film: "It seems that the celebrations welcoming the film were less about its intrinsic qualities (though there are some) and more about the fact that it fulfills a wish for a secular and Western Palestinian society. The film is supposedly a 'testimony' to the process of globalization that Palestinian society is undergoing. There was the optimism: here, peace is about to break out any moment now. Here, there is a partner on the other side. Here, 'they' have also come to the conclusion that there is no difference between genders, nationalities, and religions. The vision of 'let's have parties and everything will be fine' is reflected in the film and its warm reception. The embrace is the result of the illusion (not always conscious) that this is a 'voice of a generation.'"

The film depicted women drinking, smoking and partying, causing outrage in the Muslim community of Israel. The film was declared haram by the mayor of Umm al-Fahm, the conservative Arab home town of the character Nour. A fatwa was issued against the director, Maysaloun Hamoud, who is a Palestinian born in Hungary but now resident in Jaffa.

=== Accolades ===
At the 2016 Toronto International Film Festival, a jury awarded In Between the NETPAC Award for World or International Asian Film Premiere.

The film won three awards at the 2016 San Sebastian Film Festival: the Premio EROSKI de la juventud (Eroski Youth Award), the Premio TVE - Otra Mirada (TVE Another Look Award), and the Premio Sebastiane.

At the 2016 Haifa International Film Festival, In Between won the Danny Lerner Award for a Debut Feature Film; additionally, its three principal cast members (Hawa, Jammelieh, and Kanboura) won the Fedeora Award for Artistic Achievement in an Israeli Feature Film.

At the 2017 Ophir Awards, the film received 12 nominations and won for both Best Actress (Shaden Kanboura) and Best Supporting Actress (Mouna Hawa).
