= Bharat Bala =

Indian film director, screenwriter and producer

- Born: Ganapathy Bharat; Chennai, Tamil Nadu, India
- Occupations: Film director, screenwriter, producer
- Years active: 1997–present
- Website: bbp.co.in

Bharat Bala is an Indian film director, screenwriter and film producer who is based in Chennai and Mumbai.

== Career ==
Bharat Bala first gained national attention for the patriotic music videos Vande Mataram (1997) and Jana Gana Mana (2000), created with long-time collaborator A. R. Rahman.

He was set to direct and produce an Indo-Japanese film, co-produced by Disney, called The 19th Step, written by and starring Kamal Haasan, but the project was later shelved. He went on to direct Hari Om (2004) and Maryan (2013).

In 2010, he directed the music video of the official song of the Commonwealth Games, Jiyo Utho Bado Jeeto and also the opening ceremony of the games.

In 2019, he launched Virtual Bharat, an ongoing 1,000-film digital museum documenting India’s art, culture and landscapes. During the COVID-19 lockdown, he directed the four-minute short We Will Rise (2020), shot remotely across 14 Indian states.

At the 55th International Film Festival of India in November 2024, he spoke on the panel “Culture as Context for Cinematic Storytelling,” highlighting Virtual Bharat’s crowd-funded model.

Bala’s next feature, Mahasangam—set against the 2025 Maha Kumbh in Prayagraj and scored by A. R. Rahman—entered post-production in early 2025.

=== Virtual Bharat highlights ===
- Thaalam (2019) – inaugural short filmed at the Kerala boat races.
- Ganga – Daughter of the Himalayas (2023) – first film in the Uttarakhand cycle.
- Several additional shorts released online between 2019 and 2025.

== Filmography ==
=== Feature films ===
Year	Title	Language	Notes
2004	Hari Om	Hindi	
2013	Maryan	Tamil	
TBA	Mahasangam	Hindi	Post-production

=== Selected short films / documentaries ===
- We Will Rise (2020) – short film
- Virtual Bharat series (2019–present)
