= Virtual Bharat =

Indian documentary short film series

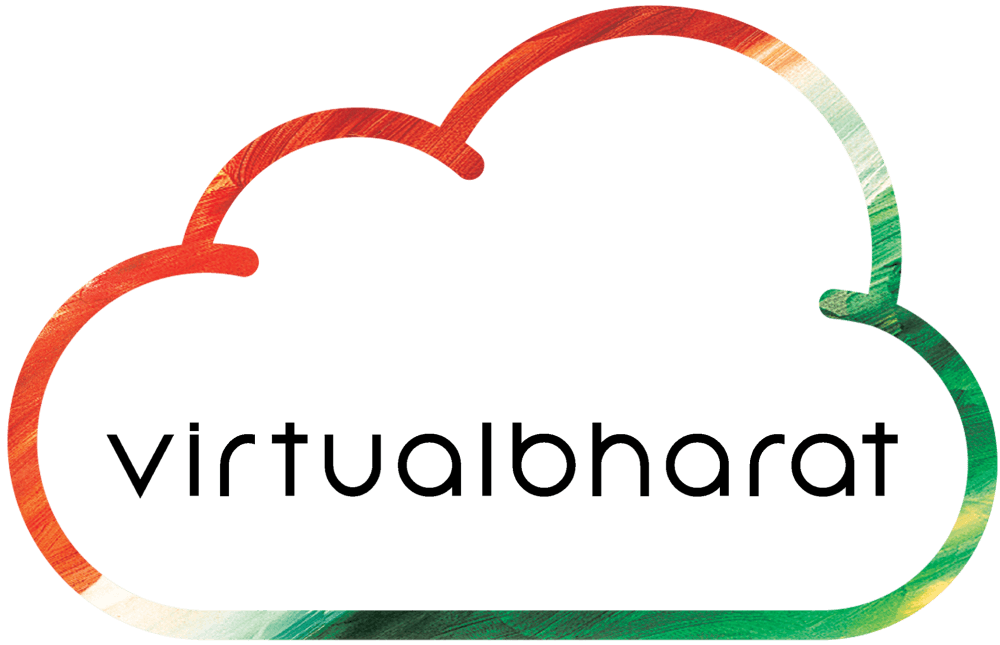
- Genre: Documentary film, short film, web series
- Directed by: Bharat Bala
- Presented by: A. R. Rahman; Gulzar; Shreya Ghoshal; Kaushiki Chakraborty
- Country of origin: India
- No. of episodes: 1,000 (expected)

Production
- Producer: Bharat Bala
- Running time: <10 minutes

Original release
- Network: YouTube
- Release: 15 August 2019 – present

Virtual Bharat is an Indian documentary short film series directed by Bharat Bala and premiered on YouTube on 15 August 2019. The series is expected to have a total of 1,000 episodes, telling stories about Indian culture, art, architecture, people, etc., with each episode lasting no more than 10 minutes.

Bharat Bala said Virtual Bharat was inspired by filmmakers David Lean and David Lynch. The first episode of the series, Thaalam is about the boat racing in Kerala, while the second episode is about the Sambalpuri poet Haldhar Nag from Odisha.
