= Totzeret HaAretz Towers =

Complex of office skyscrapers in Tel Aviv, Israel

Coordinates: 32.07290°N 34.79569°E

- מגדלי תוצרת הארץ (Hebrew)
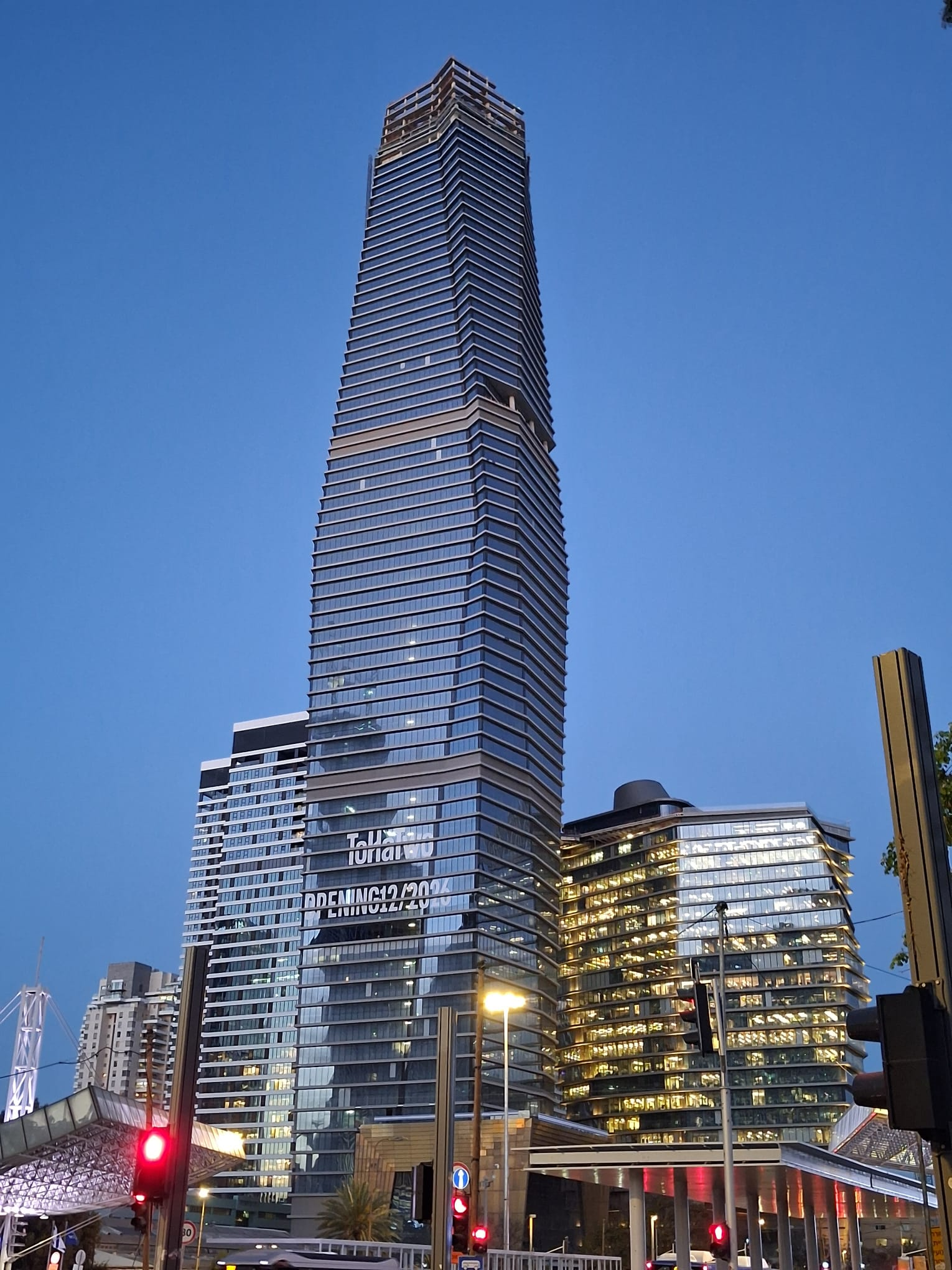
- The completed ToHa 1 Tower (right) and ToHa 2 Tower Topped Out (left) in 2026
- Interactive map of the Totzeret HaAretz Towers area
- Alternative names: ToHa

General information
- Status: Under construction
- Type: Office
- Location: Totzeret Haaretz Street, Nahalat Yitzhak, Tel Aviv, Israel
- Completed: 2019 (Tower 1); 2026 (Tower 2)
- Cost: NIS 950 million (Tower 1)

Height
- Height: 110.3 m (362 ft) (Tower 1); 302 m (991 ft) (Tower 2)

Technical details
- Structural system: Concrete
- Floor count: 30 (Tower 1); 76 (Tower 2)
- Floor area: 57,000 m^{2} (610,000 sq ft) (Tower 1); 140,000 m^{2} (1,500,000 sq ft) (Towrr 2)

Design and construction
- Architects: Ron Arad and Yashar Architects
- Developer: Amot and Gav-Yam
- Main contractor: Electra Construction Ltd. CIG Group
- Known for: Largest WeWork space in Israel

Totzeret HaAretz Towers (Hebrew: מגדלי תוצרת הארץ, Migdalei Totzeret HaAretz) (often shortened as ToHa) is an office skyscraper complex under construction in Tel Aviv, Israel. It consists of two main towers, first completed in February 2019 and standing at 110.3 m (362 ft) with 27 floors, and the second planned to stand at 302 m (991 ft) with 76 floors and slated to be inaugurated in 2026.

== History ==
The complex is located on and named after Totzeret Haaretz Street in Nahalat Yitzhak, in eastern Tel Aviv. It faces HaShalom Street in the south and Yigal Allon Street in the west. It is within walking distance of Tel Aviv HaShalom railway station.

The towers were designed by the British-Israeli architect Ron Arad and Yashar Architects, while the public space design was given to UK-based Vogt Landscape Architects, and the local company Tema. The developing company is a partnership between Amot and Gav-Yam.

Aloni Hetz, Amot's parent company, purchased two adjacent lots to build the complex, which has a total footprint of 17,000 m^{2} (180,000 ft^{2}). One lot was purchased from the Tara Compound to the west, and the other from Gazit-Globe, which saw the demolition of the latter's office building there. The complex is meant to adhere to the LEED Platinum standard.

WeWork is the largest tenant in the first tower, having leased 6.5 floors through Israeli real estate company Ampa. This is WeWork's largest space in Israel.

In 2018, Akamai Technologies rented two floors in the first tower. Other tenants include Natural Intelligence, Tufin, Dynamic Yield, Discount Investments and Trax Retail. In November 2018, Amot reported that 95% of the office space in the tower had been leased.

== Buildings ==
The Totzeret Haaretz complex consists of three towers.

=== Totzeret HaAretz 1 ===
Totzeret HaAretz 1, completed on February 3, 2019, spans 30 floors and 125 m (410 ft). It contains 57,000 m^{2} (610,000 ft^{2}) of office space, and cost ILS 950 million to build. Architect Asa Bruno from Ron Arad's office oversaw the tower's construction.

According to the architects, the tower is meant to resemble an iceberg. The tower stands on three legs of seven floors each, containing the technical infrastructure of the building. This was done in order to free up the roof, measuring about 800 m^{2} (8,600 ft^{2}) in area, for public use. The legs are also meant to house a restaurant and café, and part of the roof is reserved for a restaurant. There is atrium in the middle of the tower, spanning the floors above the legs. The building features double glass panels, with centrally-controlled curtains in between. Between the floors there are Dekton-covered protrusions that provide shade.

=== Totzeret HaAretz 2 and 3 ===
Totzeret HaAretz 2, slated for completion in 2026, will be 303 m (994 ft) tall, making it one of the tallest buildings in the city. According to the developer, a skyscraper with 140,000 m^{2} (1,500,000 ft^{2}) of office space was approved by the Tel Aviv local planning committee in August 2019. Its construction was officially announced in December 2021, with a height of 75 floors.

== Gallery ==
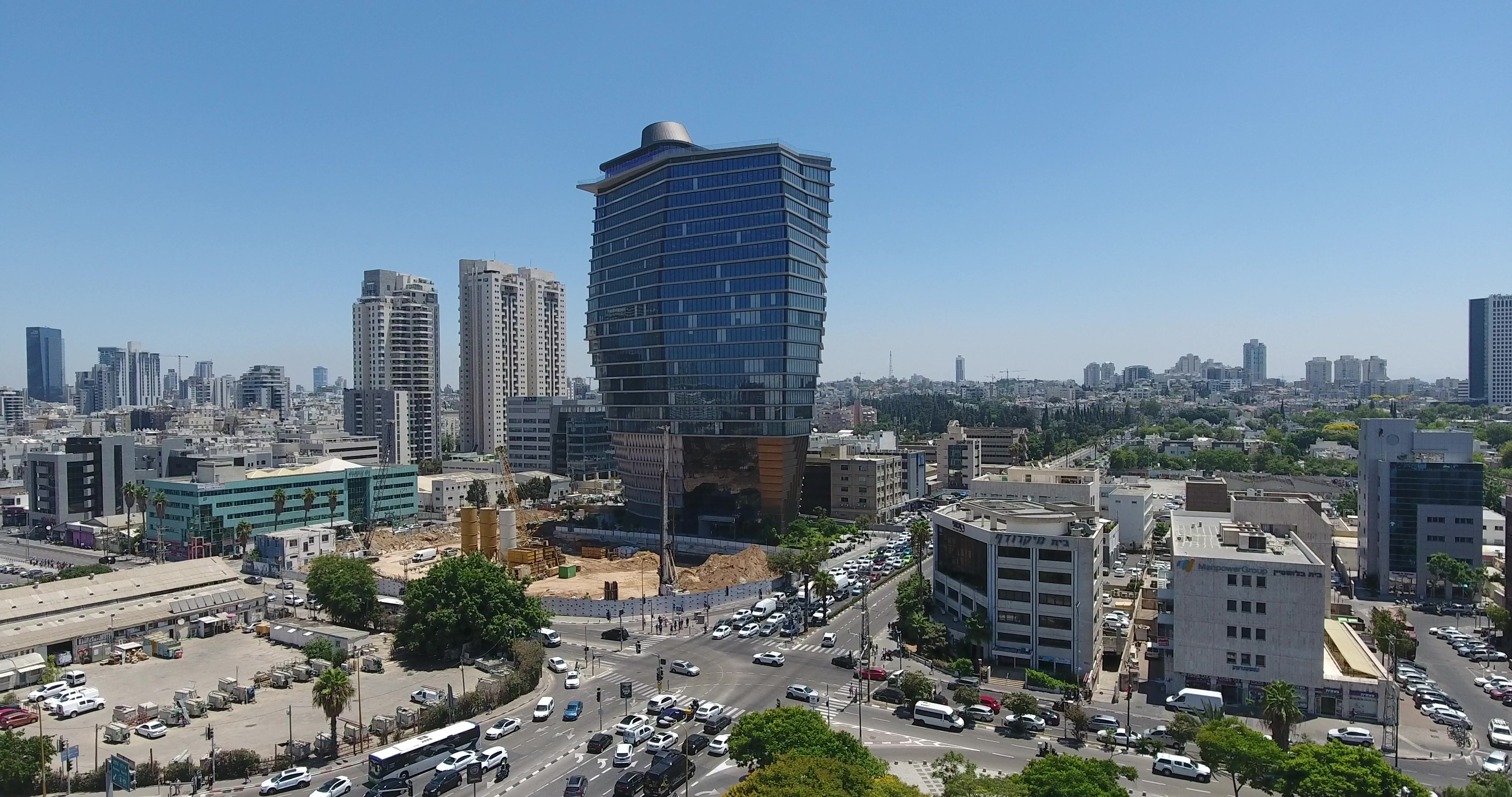
Totzeret HaAretz Tower 1, with the second tower's construction visible in the foreground

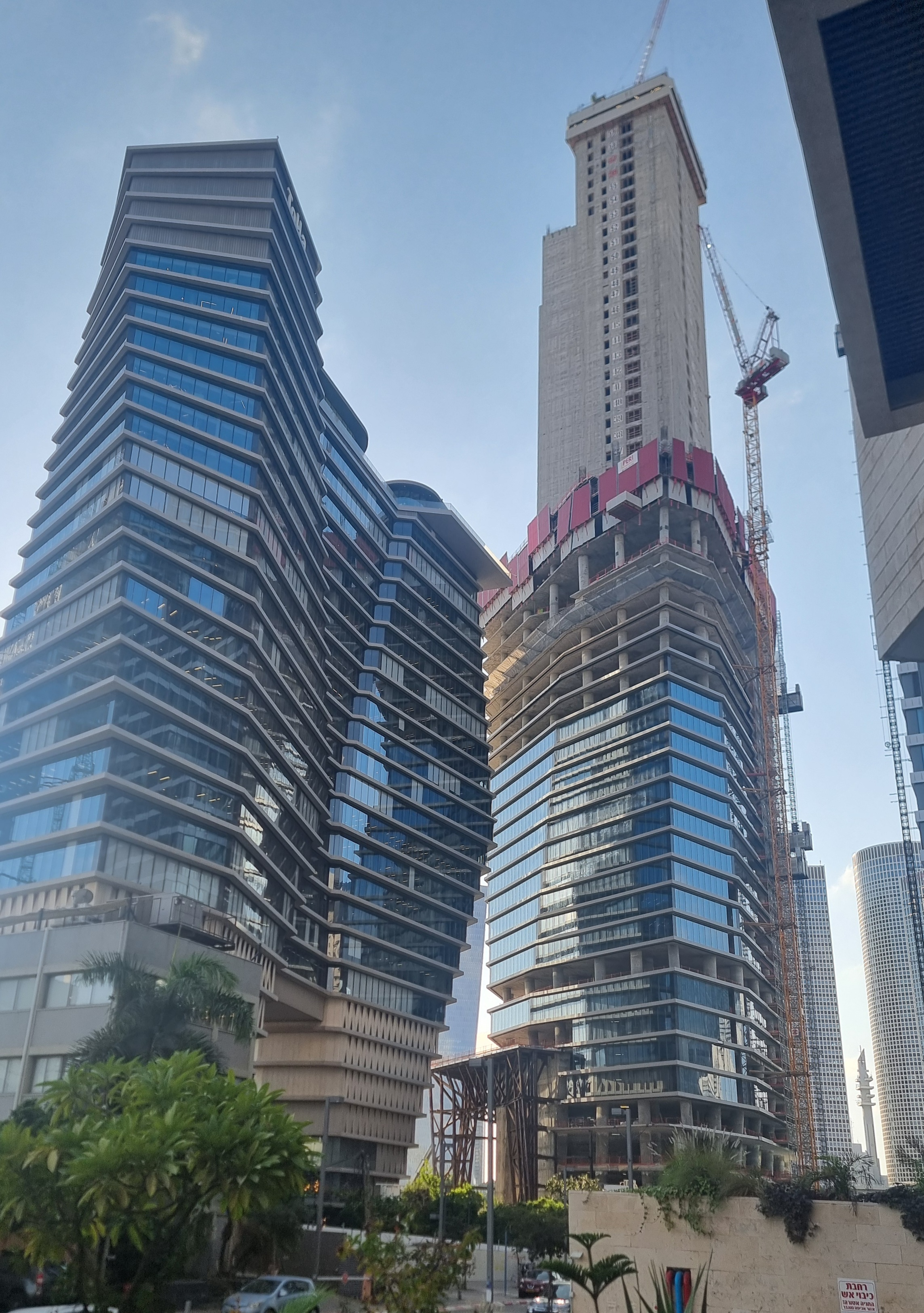
ToHa tower 2 under construction, with ToHa 1 on the left. October 2024

== See also ==
- List of tallest buildings in Israel
- List of tallest buildings in Tel Aviv
- Israeli architecture
