= Ronit Elkabetz =

Israeli actress and filmmaker (1964–2016)

- רונית אלקבץ
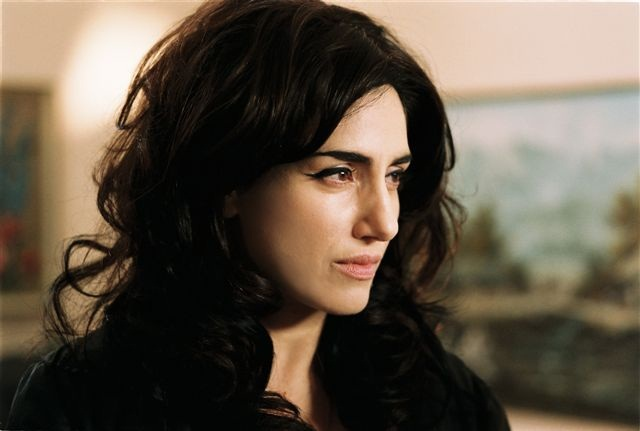
- Elkabetz in Jaffa (2009)
- Born: 27 November 1964; Beersheba, Israel
- Died: 19 April 2016 (aged 51); Tel Aviv, Israel
- Occupations: Actress; film director; screenwriter
- Years active: 1990–2016
- Spouse: Avner Yashar (m. 2010)
- Children: 2
- Relatives: Shlomi Elkabetz (brother)

Ronit Elkabetz (Hebrew: רונית אלקבץ; 27 November 1964 – 19 April 2016) was an Israeli actress, screenwriter and film director. She worked in both Israeli and French cinema. She won three Ophir Awards and received a total of seven nominations.

== Biography ==
Elkabetz was born in Beersheba in 1964 to a religious Moroccan Jewish family, originally from Essaouira. She grew up in Kiryat Yam. Her mother spoke French and Moroccan Arabic, but her father insisted on speaking only Hebrew. Elkabetz was the eldest of four children, with three younger brothers. Her younger brother Shlomi also became a director, and they worked together on the trilogy Gett: The Trial of Viviane Amsalem.

Elkabetz never studied acting and started her career as a model. She divided her time between her homes in Paris and Tel Aviv. She married architect Avner Yashar, the son of prominent architect Yitzhak Yashar and singer Rema Samsonov, on 25 June 2010. In 2012, Elkabetz gave birth to their twins, a son and daughter. During her final years, she was honorary president of the Mizrahi feminist movement "Ahoti – for Women in Israel", and volunteered in the organization's activities, such as the fair trade store and clothing drives. In 2015 she was selected to be the president of the jury for the International Critics' Week section of the 2015 Cannes Film Festival.

== Acting and directing career ==
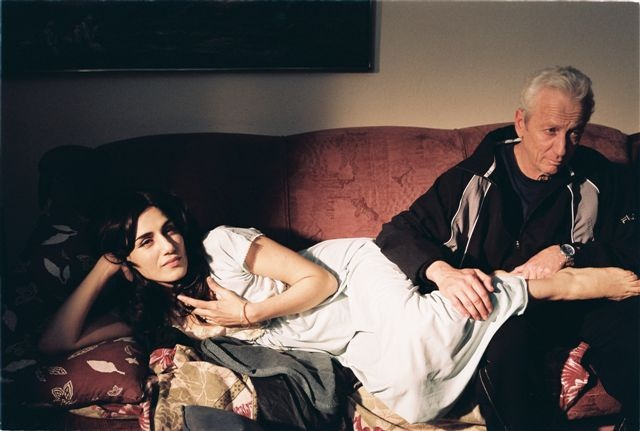
Elkabetz and Moni Moshonov in Jaffa (2009)

Elkabetz's first film appearance was in The Appointed (1990), where she played in the starring role opposite Shuli Rand. They both starred in Gidi Dar's Eddie King in 1992. In 1994 she starred in Sh'Chur, for which she won the Israeli Film Academy (Ophir) Award. In 1995 she wrote with her partner, Haim Buzaglo, the script for Scar, in which she also starred, and for which she learned French. In 1996 she starred in Amos Gitai's Metamorphosis of a Melody. In 1997 she moved to Paris to study in Ariane Mnouchkine's Théâtre du Soleil. During that period, she supported herself as a waitress. She did a one-woman show on the life of the choreographer Martha Graham at the Avignon Festival.

In 2000 she guest-starred in the popular Israeli drama series, Florentine. Her character, Nicole, made history, sharing the first-ever lesbian kiss on Israeli television with Shira (Ayelet Zurer).

In 2001 she starred in the French film Origine contrôlée, and won her second Ophir Award for Late Marriage. In 2003 she teamed again with Gitai on Alila. In 2004 she was nominated for an Ophir Award for Or (My Treasure), and starred in the Israeli legal drama series Franco and Spector.

In 2004 she wrote, directed (with her brother, Shlomi Elkabetz) and starred in the semi-autobiographic film To Take a Wife, for which she was again nominated for an Ophir Award.

In 2006 she also starred in the Israeli drama series Parashat HaShavua. In 2007 she starred in Eran Kolirin's The Band's Visit, for which she won her third Ophir Award.

In 2008 she and Shlomi finished their second film, Shiva ("Seven Days"), which won the Wolgin Award for Best Feature Film at the 2008 Jerusalem Film Festival.

In 2009 she starred alongside Catherine Deneuve in André Téchiné's La Fille du RER. Her other recent French projects have included Ashes and Blood, Turk's Head, and Les mains libres. In 2010 she received an Ophir Award nomination for Best Actress for her work in Mabul. She was recently the subject of Nir Bergman's documentary A Stranger in Paris.

Her 2014 film Gett: The Trial of Viviane Amsalem was selected to be screened as part of the Directors' Fortnight section of the 2014 Cannes Film Festival. This was the final film Elkabetz directed prior to her death.

== Critical acclaim ==
Israeli film critic Uri Klein wrote: "Moviegoers can admire Ronit Elkabetz or recoil from her, or admire and recoil at the same time. Ignoring her is not an option. The mystery and the exoticism, the threat and the danger have ultimately gathered into a potent presence and cogent control."

In May 2010, Elkabetz received the France Culture award at the Cannes Film Festival, a prize awarded to filmmakers for quality work and social involvement. The judges described her as a "woman teeming with passion and erotica, who can even play the queen of Egypt."

Pascal Elbé, director of Turk's Head, cited his enthusiasm for casting Elkabetz: "I chose an actress who reminds me of those great Italian stars of the postwar period, like Anna Magnani."

In 2010, Elkabetz received a lifetime achievement award from the Israeli Film Academy for her contribution to Israeli cinema.

== Honors and awards ==
Knight of the Order of Legion of Honour

== Death ==
Elkabetz died of lung cancer in Tel Aviv on 19 April 2016 at the age of 51 after a long struggle with the disease. She is buried at Kiryat Shaul Cemetery.

== Film and television credits ==
List of film and television credits
Year	Title	Role	Notes
1990	The Appointed	Oshra	Original title: Hameyu'ad
1992	Eddie King		
1994	Sh'Chur	Pnina	Ophir Award :Film; 1994 official Israeli submission for the Academy Award for Best Foreign Language Film; Ophir Award for Best Supporting Actress
1995	Tzalaket		
1996	Metamorphosis of a Melody		Amos Gitai film
1997	Ben Gurion		Short film
2000	Florentine	Nicole	TV series. 2 episodes
2001	Origine contrôlée	Sonia	US title: Made in France
2001	Late Marriage	Judith	Ophir Award for Best Actress; Buenos Aires International Festival of Independent Cinema Award for Best Actress; International Thessaloniki Film Festival Award for Best Actress
2003	Alila	Ronit	
2003–2004	Franco Ve'Spector	Dafna Spector	TV series, 8 episodes
2004	Or (My Treasure)	Ruthie	International Film Festival Bratislava Grand Prix; Mexico City International Contemporary Film Festival Special Distinction Award for Best Actress; Nominated—Ophir Award for Best Supporting Actress
2004	To Take a Wife	Director; Viviane	Hamburg Film Festival Critics Award; Mons International Festival of Love Films Award for Best Actress; Venice Film Festival Audience Award and Isvema Award; Nominated—Ophir Award for Best Actress
2006–2009	Parashat Ha-Shavua	Elia Ben-David	25 episodes
2007	The Band's Visit	Dina	Ophir Award for Best Actress; Ghent International Film Festival Special Mention Award; Jerusalem Film Festival Award for Best Actress
2008	Shiva	Director; Vivianne	Jerusalem Film Festival Wolgin Award for Best Israeli Feature; Nominated—Ophir Award for Best Director; Nominated—Ophir Award for Best Screenplay; Nominated—Ophir Award for Best Actress
2008	L'endroit idéal	Barbara	Short film
2009	Zion and His Brother	Mother	
2009	The Girl on the Train	Judith	André Téchiné film
2009	Jaffa	Osnat 'Ossi' Wolf	
2009	Ashes and Blood	Judith	Cendres et sang
2010	Turk's Head	Sibel, la mère de Bora	Tête de turc
2010	Les mains libres	Barbara	
2010	Mabul	Miri Roshko	Nominated—Ophir Award for Best Actress
2011	Invisible	Lily	
2012	Zarafa	Bouboulina (voice)	
2014	Gett: The Trial of Viviane Amsalem	Director; role of Viviane Amsalem	Nominated—Ophir Award for Best Director; Nominated—Ophir Award for Best Screenplay; Nominated—Ophir Award for Best Actress
2016	Trepalium	Nadia Passeron	French TV series
2021	Black Notebooks - Viviane	Herself	documentary about herself, directed by her brother Shlomi Elkabetz
2021	Black Notebooks - Ronit	Herself	documentary about herself, directed by her brother Shlomi Elkabetz
