= Camille Natta =

French actress

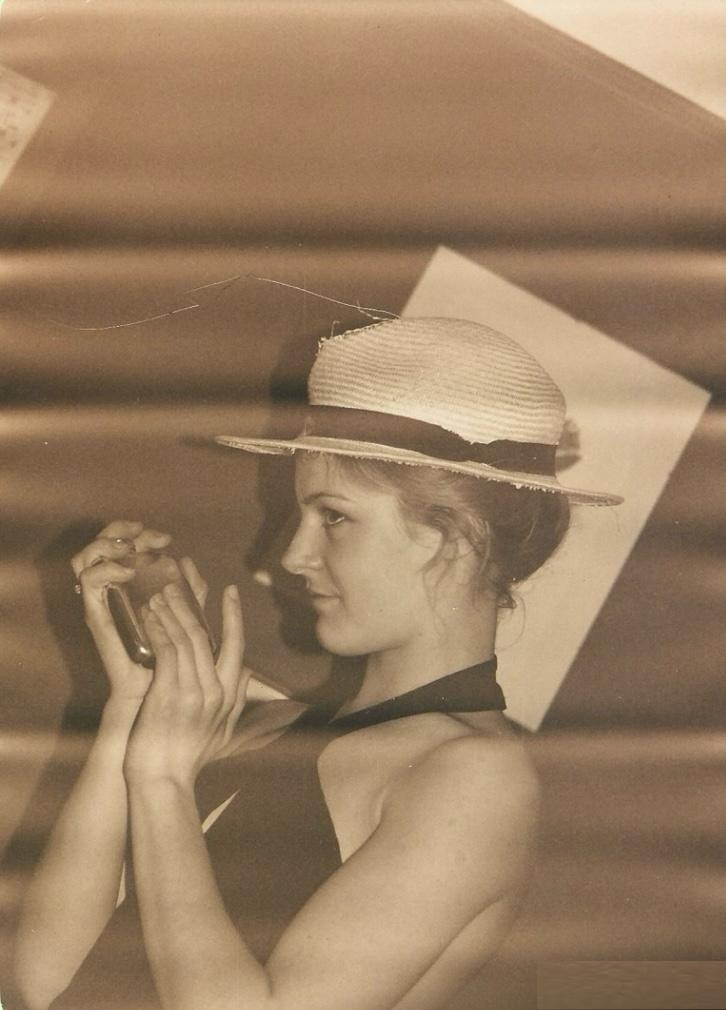
- Education: University of Oxford
- Occupation: Actress
- Years active: 1998–present

Camille Natta is an actress-director and photographer best known for her lead role in Hari Om (2004), her performance opposite Jean Reno in Crimson Rivers II (2004), and as artistic collaborator on writing and direction for the film Julia (2008) directed by Erick Zonca and starring Tilda Swinton.

== Early life and education ==
Born in South Africa to French and English parents, she was raised in Saudi Arabia and then France. She graduated from the University of Oxford with a Master of Arts, where she received the Spirit of Cuppers Award for her performance and directorial debut in What the Butler Saw.

She presently lives in Los Angeles, where she studied screenwriting at UCLA and trained with acting coaches Jack Waltzer and Larry Moss.

== Career ==
Fluent in English, French, and German, she began her professional career in theatre, performing in Paris at venues including La Cartoucherie and Le Théâtre de la Tempête under director Philippe Adrien.

Natta’s film roles include the female lead opposite Jean Reno and Christopher Lee in Crimson Rivers II (2004), and the lead in Hari Om (2004), an independent feature shot in Rajasthan. Following its release, The Wall Street Journal described her as “the new face of Bollywood.”

She later appeared in Nina (2016) opposite Zoe Saldana, The Blacklist with James Spader (2021).

She was artistic collaborator on writing and directing with Erick Zonca on Julia (2008), a feature film starring Tilda Swinton which screened at the Berlin Film Festival.

As a photographer she was exhibited at agnès b.’s gallery in Paris and her portrait of Tilda Swinton made the cover of Le Monde. She has collaborated with photographer Linda Tuloup, whose work featuring Natta is part of the permanent collection at the Maison Européenne de la Photographie in Paris.

== Filmography ==
Year	Title	Role
2003	Not For, or Against (Quite the Contrary)	Liz
2004	Crimson Rivers II: Angels of the Apocalypse	Marie
2004	Hari Om	Willowy Isa
2010	Acorazado	Camille
2010	Kissing Strangers	Andrea
2015	Nina	Michelle Laroche
