= Turk's Head =

2010 French thriller film directed by Pascal Elbé

- Theatrical release poster
- Directed by: Pascal Elbé
- Written by: Pascal Elbé
- Produced by: Françoise Galfré; Patrick Godeau
- Starring: Roschdy Zem; Pascal Elbé; Ronit Elkabetz
- Cinematography: Jean-François Hensgens
- Edited by: Luc Barnier
- Music by: Bruno Coulais
- Production companies: Alicéléo; France 2 Cinéma; La Banque Postale Image 3 Sofica Europacorp; Canal+ CinéCinéma; France Télévisions; Angoa-Agicoa; Fonds Images de la Diversité
- Distributed by: Warner Bros. Pictures
- Release date: 31 March 2010
- Running time: 87 minutes
- Country: France
- Language: French
- Budget: €5.5m

Turk's Head (French: Tête de turc – the expression also has the colloquial meaning of 'scapegoat' or 'fall guy' in French) is a 2010 French thriller film directed by and starring Pascal Elbé. Roschdy Zem and Israel actress, Ronit Elkabetz also star. It was released in France on 31 March 2010. The film was inspired by the real-life incident in 2006 in Marseille where a group of impoverished teenagers torched a bus, severely burning a female passenger. It received its international premiere 'in competition' on 31 August 2010 at the Montreal World Film Festival, this will be followed by a theatrical release in Canada on 10 September 2010.

== Plot ==
Set amidst Marseille's immigrant suburbs, a devastating chain of events unfolds when 14-year-old Turk, Bora, hurls a Molotov cocktail at a car. The occupant is an emergency doctor who has been called out to attend to a woman with cardiac problems. Regretful, the teenager rescues the injured doctor who ends up in a coma. The saga continues with the doctor's brother seeking to find the perpetrator.

== Cast ==
- Roschdy Zem as Atom
- Pascal Elbé as Simon
- Ronit Elkabetz as Sibel, Bora's mother
- Samir Makhlouf as Bora
- Simon Abkarian as Le veuf
- Florence Thomassin as Mouna
- Valérie Benguigui as Yelda
- Monique Chaumette as Nora, Atom's and Simon's mother
- Laure Marsac as Claire, Atom's girlfriend
- Stéphan Guérin-Tillié as Samuel Levasseur
- Gamil Ratib as Aram
- Moussa Maaskri as Irfan
- Adèle Exarchopoulos as Nina
- Léo Elbé as Nuri
- Annie Grégorio as The nurse
- Brigitte Catillon as The mayor

== Production ==
For the project, Elbé undertook extensive research: "I met with social workers, emergency doctors and policemen.. I also saw completely neglected housing estates, where there are no longer any police stations within a 2km radius.. For me, it’s a socially-engaged film.. I took inspiration from the films of Robert Altman, Paul Haggis and especially those of Alejandro Gonzalez Inarritu. I told myself it was risky, but there was no reason not to try this in France."

The director also researched the real-life perpetrators of a Marseille bus attack that influenced his narrative, "What shocked me most was that one year later, the youths didn’t speak up during the trial and never asked for forgiveness", explained the director. "As though their prison sentence had served no purpose. And as though our social pact had been shattered to pieces."

Character-driven roles were an important element for Elbe, as he explained the development of his preferred character, Sybil (Elkabetz). "I think of the mother as a cowboy in a skirt. She keeps her dignity, because if she falls, everything else does. Through her, I wanted to pay homage to all those mothers in the banlieues who raise the kids alone because their husbands have gone. I chose an actress who reminds me of those great Italian stars of the postwar period, like Anna Magnani."

At a cost of €5.5m, the film was produced by Alicéleo and France 2 Cinéma co-produced the project. The film also received financial backing from the National Film and Moving Image Centre (CNC).

== Reception ==
The film received a positive reaction from Le Monde newspaper. Their reviewer, Jean-Luc Douin praised the "engaging" film for "tackling society issues and confronting questions of morality". Le Figaro praised Elbé for "embracing themes of violence, the code of silence, and love all serviced by a reasonable cast." The newspaper continued to describe it as a "tremendously humane film". It was screened at the 2010 Montreal World Film Festival and subsequently the city's only English-language daily newspaper, The Gazette gave the "remarkable drama" 4 out of 5 stars.
