= Hari Om (film) =

Indian Hindi-language film

- Film poster
- Directed by: Bharat Bala
- Written by: Sanjay Lafont
- Screenplay by: Bharat Bala
- Story by: Bharat Bala
- Produced by: Bharat Bala; Ramesh Tuarani; Kumar Sadhuram Taurani
- Starring: Vijay Raaz; Jean Marie Lamour; Camille Natta
- Cinematography: Angus Hudson
- Edited by: Kanika Myer
- Music by: Nitin Sawhney
- Production companies: Tips Films; Bharatbala Productions
- Release date: 2004
- Country: India
- Language: Hindi
- Budget: ₹23 crore

Hari Om is a 2004 Indian Hindi-language film directed by Bharat Bala and starring Vijay Raaz, Jean Marie Lamour and Camille Natta.

== Cast ==
- Vijay Raaz as "Hari Om"
- Jean Marie Lamour as Benoit
- Camille Natta as Willowy Isa
- A. K. Hangal
- Anupam Shyam

== Reception ==
Dennis Harvey of Variety wrote, "A game attempt at international-crossover cinema by first-time feature helmer/co-writer Bharatbala, ‘Hari Om' emerges a pleasant but formulaic effort that may be too Westernized for Indian auds and too commercially superficial for Western arthouses". Film critic Baradwaj Rangan wrote, "The best thing about Hari Om is that it sells an India that simply is; not the India from the glossy brochures but the real India, our love affair with which goes on and on".

== Accolades ==
The film won the Audience Award at the Bucheon International Fantastic Film Festival. The film was selected for the Toronto International Film Festival.
