= List of most expensive French films =

This is a non-definitive list of the most expensive French films, with budgets given in Euros, Francs, and US dollars. Only films with budgets exceeding US$20 million are listed here.

== List ==
Most expensive French films
Title	Primary language(s)	Year	Production costs (est.)	Ref(s)
Valerian and the City of a Thousand Planets	English	2017	$209 million (€197 million)	
Alexander^{[A]}	English	2004	$155 million	
Asterix at the Olympic Games	French	2008	$113.5 million	
Arthur and the Revenge of Maltazard	English	2009	$96 million (€63 million)	
Arthur 3: The War of the Two Worlds	English	2010	$91 million (€68.83 million)	
The Fifth Element	English	1997	$90 million (Note: Conflicting sources stated the film's budget to be various figures between $50 million and $100 million. The most frequently cited figure and also the figure cited by Luc Besson in his book, The Story of The Fifth Element is $90 million.)	
The Three Musketeers^{[A]}	English	2011	$90 million (€58 million)	
Ladybug & Cat Noir: The Movie	French	2023	$86 million (€80 million)	
Arthur and the Minimoys	English	2006	$84.6 million (€63 million)	
De Gaulle	French	2025	$84.5 million (€75.5 million)	
Oceans	French	2009	$80 million (€57.1 million)	
Asterix and Obelix: God Save Britannia	French	2012	$78 million	
The Three Musketeers: D'Artagnan; The Three Musketeers: Milady (Note: Both films were shot simultaneously and split into two parts.)	French	2023	$78 million (€72 million)	
The Little Prince	English	2015	$77.5 million	
Hannibal Rising^{[A]}	English	2007	$75 million	
Asterix & Obelix: The Middle Kingdom	French	2023	$72.4 million (€65 million)	
The Messenger: The Story of Joan of Arc	English	1999	$60 million (FRF390 million)	
Babylon A.D.	French	2008	$60 million (€55 million)	
Mesrine	French	2008	$60 million	
A Very Long Engagement	French	2004	$58 million (€45 million)	
Two Brothers	French	2004	€57.8 million	
Sur la piste du Marsupilami	French	2012	$50 million (€40 million)	
From Paris with Love	English	2010	$52 million (€29.1 million)	
Asterix & Obelix Take On Caesar	French	1999	$48.5 million (FRF275 million)	
Taken 3	English	2015	$48 million	
Asterix & Obelix: Mission Cleopatra	French	2002	$47 million (€50 million)	
Taken 2	English	2012	$45 million	
Unleashed	English	2005	$43 million (€25.6 million)	
The Count of Monte Cristo	French	2024	€42.9 million	
The Extraordinary Adventures of Adèle Blanc-Sec	French	2010	$40.8 million (€30 million)	
Lucy	English	2014	$40–100 million (Note: On 5 August 2014, Variety wrote that Lucy had an estimated $100 million pricetag and was a record-setting investment for EuropaCorp, but other sources and even previous articles published by Variety claim the film's budget is $40 million. France's CNC lists the budget as €49.01 million.) (€49.01 million)	
Colombiana	English	2011	$40 million (€32.1 million)	
Black Gold	English	2011	€38.5–40 million	
Wolf Totem^{[A]}	Mandarin, Mongolian	2015	$38 million	
The Sisters Brothers	English	2018	$38 million (€34.9 million)	
Blueberry	English	2004	€34.5 million	
Beauty and the Beast	French	2014	€34.05 million	
Asterix: The Secret of the Magic Potion	French	2018	€33.7 million	
Mr. Nobody^{[A]}	English	2009	€33 million	
Animal Kingdom: Let's Go Ape	French	2015	€32 million	
Supercondriaque	French	2014	€31.68 million	
The Ghost Writer	English	2010	€30.8 million	
His Majesty Minor	French	2007	€30.4 million	
The Family	English	2013	$30 million (€28.37 million)	
The Young and Prodigious T. S. Spivet	English	2013	$30 million (€26.8 million)	
Grace of Monaco	English	2014	$30 million (€25.2 million)	
Anna	English	2019	$30 million	
Seasons	French	2016	€29.8 million	
Brotherhood of the Wolf	French	2001	$29 million (FRF200 million)	
The Stone Council	French	2008	$28 million (€20 million)	
Monsieur Aznavour	French	2024	$28 million (€26 million)	
Paris 36	French	2008	€28 million	
Empire of the Wolves	French	2004	$27 million (€24.2 million)	
The Man with the Iron Heart	English	2017	€27.8 million	
Bandidas	English, Spanish	2006	€27.7 million	
A Perfect Plan	French	2012	€26.3 million	
Les Dalton	French	2004	€26.1 million	
A Monster in Paris	French	2011	€28.2 million	
Ruby & Quentin	French	2003	€26.7 million	
Lucky Luke	French	2009	€26.2 million	
Camping 2	French	2010	€25.7 million	
The Visitors: Bastille Day	French	2016	€24.75 million	
Emilia Pérez	Spanish	2024	€25 million	
Micmacs	French	2009	€23.8 million	
Bon Voyage	French	2003	€24.1 million	
Crimson Rivers II: Angels of the Apocalypse	French	2004	€23.8 million	
San-Antonio	French	2004	€23.4 million	
Immortal	English	2004	€22.5 million	
Double Zéro	French	2004	€21.5 million	
Iznogoud	French	2005	€21.4 million	
Little Nicholas	French	2009	€21.4 million	
Man to Man	English	2005	€21.2 million	
La Vie en Rose	French	2007	$25 million (€20.7 million)	
Cinéman	French	2009	€20.6 million	
The Crimson Rivers	French	2000	$25 million (€14.4 million)	
Taken	English	2008	$25 million (€19.4 million)	
Benedetta	French	2021	$24 million (€19.8 million)	
The Wolf's Call	French	2019	$23 million (€20 million)	
Jeanne du Barry	French	2023	$22.4 million	
Rust and Bone	French	2012	$22 million (€15 million)	
Le Boulet	French	2002	$21.4 million (Ffr158 million)	

== See also ==
- List of most expensive films
- List of most expensive non-English-language films
- List of highest-grossing films in France

== Notes ==
- ^{A} French co-production.
