= To Take a Wife =

- Promotional poster
- Directed by: Ronit Elkabetz; Shlomi Elkabetz
- Written by: Ronit Elkabetz; Shlomi Elkabetz
- Produced by: Eric Cohen; Jean-Philippe Reza; Marek Rozenbaum; Itai Tamir
- Starring: Ronit Elkabetz; Simon Abkarian; Gilbert Melki; Sulika Kadosh; Dalia Beger; Kobi Regev; Omer Moshkovitz; Yam Eitan; Valérie Zarrouk; Carl Zrihen
- Cinematography: Yaron Scharf
- Edited by: Joel Alexis
- Music by: Michel Korb
- Distributed by: Sophie Dulac Distribution
- Release dates: September 2004 (Venice Film Festival); 26 January 2005 (France)
- Running time: 99 minutes
- Countries: Israel; France
- Languages: French; Hebrew; Moroccan Arabic

To Take a Wife (VeLakahta Lekha Isha; French: Prendre femme) is a 2004 drama film. It is the directorial debut of veteran actress Ronit Elkabetz, who also stars in the film and was nominated for an Ophir Award for her performance. The film, a joint Israeli-French production, marks the debut of both directors, who were siblings, and serves as a kind of shared autobiography.

It premiered at the 61st Venice International Film Festival in September 2004 and screened in numerous countries, receiving widespread international acclaim.

The film is the first in a trilogy about the unhappy marriage of Viviane. It was followed by Shiva in 2008, and Gett: The Trial of Viviane Amsalem in 2014.

== Plot ==
In Haifa in 1979, hairdresser Viviane Amsalem listens to her brothers as they argue her out of asking her husband for a divorce and convince her to go back to him. In front of her family, her husband, Eliahou, promises her that everything will be different. However, in the morning, he leaves her to fend for herself as she struggles with attending to her four children. Before she starts work, she receives a call from Albert, a former lover, asking her to meet with him. Over the course of the day, she attends to her hairdressing clients, her husband, and her children, but as her petty grievances with her husband add up, she ends the night exploding at him and beating him with her fists in front of her children and her neighbour, who enters the home and helps to separate her from her husband.

The following day, Viviane agrees to see Albert in a cafe where he asks her to leave her husband and reveals that the last time he asked her, she was ready to go, but he ended up fleeing with his family to Africa. After their meeting, he drops her at a bus stop in the rain, but returns to give her a kiss.

The following morning, Viviane dreams that she is driving a car in the countryside. She is awakened by her husband who is angry because their eldest son refuses to go to synagogue with him. When Viviane asks him to leave their son alone, they fight, and the fight escalates to the point where Viviane, in anger, breaks the rules of Shabbat by lighting a match for her cigarette. Eliahou ultimately leaves for synagogue alone, leaving Viviane weeping. In synagogue, while serving as hazzan, he stumbles in his singing as he is still upset from his fight with his wife.

== Cast ==
- Ronit Elkabetz as Viviane
- Simon Abkarian as Eliahou
- Gilbert Melki as Albert
- Sulika Kadosh as Mémé
- Dalia Beger as Dona
- Kobi Regev as Eviatar
- Omer Moshkovitz as Gabrielle
- Yam Eitan as Lior
- Valérie Zarrouk as Yvette
- Carl Zrihen as Victor

== Production ==
The film was loosely based on the marriage of co-directors Ronit and Shlomi Elkabetz's parents. Like the characters in the movie, their mother was a hairdresser and their father a religious postal worker. The film was always planned to be the first in a series based on Viviane Amsalem's struggle to free herself.

== Reception ==
The film received generally positive reviews. Critic Jay Weissberg writing for Variety likened the script to the writing of playwright Edward Albee and praised co-director and star Ronit Elkabetz in particular for a "searing portrayal [that] takes the breathe [sic] away."

== Awards and nominations ==
Israeli Film Academy

- Ophir Award for Best Actress - Ronit Elkabetz (won)

Hamburg Film Festival

- Critics Award - Ronit Elkabetz & Shlomi Elkabetz (won)

Mons International Festival of Love Films

- Best Actor - Simon Abkarian (won)
- Best Actress - Ronit Elkabetz (won)

Thessaloniki Film Festival

- Best Actor - Simon Abkarian (won)
- Golden Alexandar Award - Ronit Elkabetz & Shlomi Elkabetz (nominated)

Venice Film Festival

- Audience Award (Critics' Week) - Ronit Elkabetz & Shlomi Elkabetz (won)
- Isvema Award - Ronit Elkabetz & Shlomi Elkabetz (won)
