= Pascal Elbé =

French actor and screenwriter

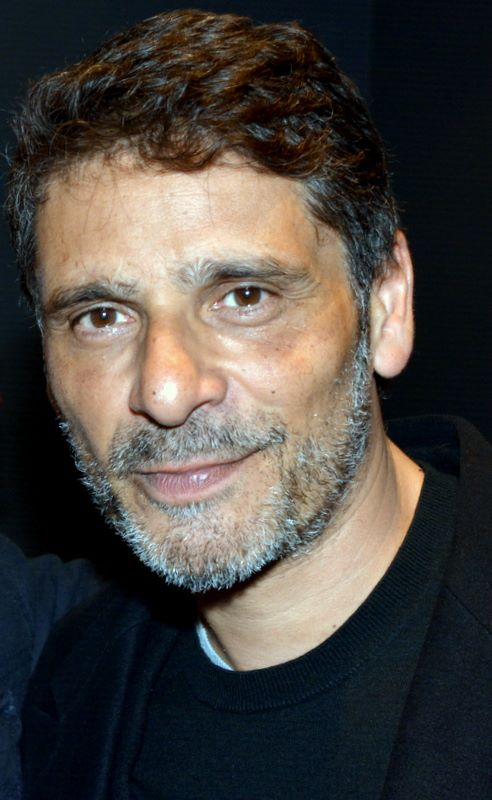
- Pascal Elbé in 2016
- Born: 13 March 1967 (age 59); Colmar, Haut-Rhin, France
- Occupations: Actor, screenwriter, film director
- Spouse: Beatrice Elbé (1992-2014)

Pascal Elbé (born 13 March 1967) is a French actor, director and screenwriter.

== Life and career ==
Pascal Elbé was born in Colmar, Haut-Rhin, France, to a family of middle-class Jewish immigrants from Algeria. He was raised in Strasbourg. At 18, he moved to Paris to study acting. In 2004, Elbe was nominated for a César Award for Most Promising Actor.

Elbé was previously married to Beatrice Elbé; they separated in 2014 after twenty-two years together. They have a son together, Leo.

== Filmography ==
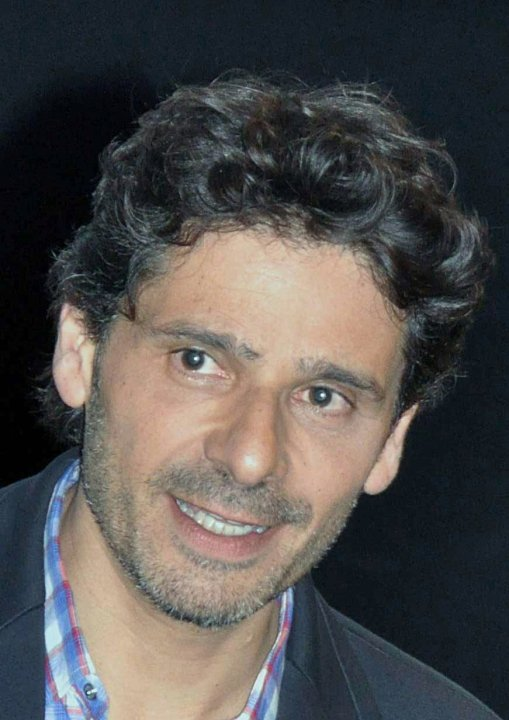
Pascal Elbé at the premiere of Turk's Head

Title	Year	Director	Role
XXL	1997	Ariel Zeitoun	François Stern
The Race	2002	Djamel Bensalah	Mathias Morin
Père et fils	2003	Michel Boujenah	Simon
Gamblers	2005	Frederic Balekdjian	Vahé Krikorian
Comme les autres	2008	Vincent Garenq	Philippe
A Simple Heart	2008		
Turk's Head	2010	Pascal Elbé	Simon
R.I.F.	2011		
Cherry on the Cake	2012	Laura Morante	Antoine
The Other Son	2012	Lorraine Lévy	Alon Silberg
24 Days	2014	Alexandre Arcady	Didier Halimi
No Second Chance	2015	François Velle	Richard Millot
Knock	2017	Lorraine Lévy (2)	Lansky
Brillantissime	2018	Michèle Laroque	
