= Gett: The Trial of Viviane Amsalem =

2014 film

- Film poster
- גט - המשפט של ויויאן אמסלם
- Directed by: Ronit Elkabetz; Shlomi Elkabetz
- Written by: Ronit Elkabetz; Shlomi Elkabetz
- Produced by: Sandrine Brauer; Rémi Burah; Denis Carot; Michael Eckelt; Shlomi Elkabetz; Marie Masmonteil
- Starring: Ronit Elkabetz; Menashe Noy; Sasson Gabai; Simon Abkarian
- Cinematography: Jeanne Lapoirie
- Edited by: Joëlle Alexis
- Distributed by: Les Films du Losange (France)
- Release dates: 16 May 2014 (Cannes); 25 June 2014 (France)
- Running time: 115 minutes
- Countries: Israel; Germany; France
- Languages: Hebrew; Moroccan-Arabic; French

Gett: The Trial of Viviane Amsalem (Hebrew: גט - המשפט של ויויאן אמסלם, romanized: Get — Ha'mishpat shel Vivian Amsalem) is a 2014 internationally co-produced drama film written and directed by Ronit Elkabetz and Shlomi Elkabetz, who were siblings. It was screened as part of the Directors' Fortnight section of the 2014 Cannes Film Festival. It was also screened in the Contemporary World Cinema section at the 2014 Toronto International Film Festival.

The film was selected as the Israeli entry for the Best Foreign Language Film at the 87th Academy Awards, but was not nominated. It was nominated for the Best Foreign Language Film at the 72nd Golden Globe Awards.

The film is the third in a trilogy focusing on the unhappy marriage of Viviane Amsalem, the first being To Take a Wife and the second Shiva.

== Plot ==
Viviane Amsalem (Ronit Elkabetz) has been married to her husband, Elisha (Simon Abkarian), for over twenty years. She goes to a religious court in order to obtain a gett as they are living apart and she no longer wants to be married to him. He still hopes to reunite and asks her to move back in with him. The court of rabbis order a trial reunion for the couple which Viviane tries to comply with. After several attempts to comply with the order the marital discord is so severe that she insists on a separation and the divorce trial begins.

Over the course of several years Viviane struggles to obtain a divorce as her husband does his best to slow the process. Though he tries to prove that he is a good husband and a pious man, witnesses reveal that Elisha is vengeful and petty and that Viviane has in fact been unhappy with him for years. After Elisha's brother, who is acting as his representative, accuses Viviane's lawyer, Carmel, of being in love with her, the two brothers feud and Elisha tries to avoid more court appearances. He is then held in contempt of court and finally agrees that he will divorce his wife if the rabbinical judicial panel orders him to. However, when they do so he refuses to grant the divorce. Viviane pleads for help and mercy from the panel but they tell her they are unable to help her.

Sometime later Viviane and Elisha return to court having reached an agreement to divorce. Witnesses sign the gett and the rabbis give the document to Elisha to hand to Viviane. However, during the divorce ceremony Elisha finds himself unable to say that Viviane is free to be with other men. Viviane and Elisha are kicked out of the court. Elisha begs for a last minute audience with Viviane and agrees to grant her the divorce if she will promise to never be with another man. Viviane promises and the two return to the courtroom to have their divorce finalized.

== Cast ==
- Ronit Elkabetz as Viviane Amsalem
- Simon Abkarian as Elisha Amsalem
- Menashe Noy as Carmel Ben-Tovim
- Sasson Gabai as Rabbi Shimon Amsalem
- Rami Danon as Rabbi Danino
- Roberto Pollak as Rabbi Abraham
- Eli Gorenstein as Head Rabbi Salomon

== Reception ==
Gett was lauded by film critics, earning a 90/100 average on Metacritic and a 100% approval rating on Rotten Tomatoes based 78 reviews. Variety magazine's Jay Weissberg praised its "beautifully modulated script, ripe with moments of liberating humor".

In a 2016 BBC poll, Matt Zoller Seitz voted it the greatest film since 2000.

== See also ==
- List of submissions to the 87th Academy Awards for Best Foreign Language Film
- List of Israeli submissions for the Academy Award for Best Foreign Language Film
- List of films with a 100% rating on Rotten Tomatoes, a film review aggregator website
