= Crimson Rivers II: Angels of the Apocalypse =

- French theatrical release poster
- Directed by: Olivier Dahan
- Written by: Luc Besson
- Produced by: Ilan Goldman
- Starring: Jean Reno; Benoît Magimel; Christopher Lee; Camille Natta
- Cinematography: Alex Lamarque
- Edited by: Richard Marizy
- Music by: Colin Towns
- Production companies: EuropaCorp; Studio Légende; TF1 Films Production; Filmauro; Epica Ltd.; Canal+
- Distributed by: EuropaCorp Distribution (France); Filmauro (Italy); Columbia TriStar Film Distributors International (United Kingdom)
- Release dates: 18 February 2004 (France); 26 March 2004 (Italy)
- Running time: 100 minutes
- Countries: France; Italy; United Kingdom
- Languages: French; German; Italian
- Budget: €23.8 million
- Box office: $55.8 million

Crimson Rivers II: Angels of the Apocalypse (French: Les Rivières pourpres II: Les Anges de l'apocalypse) is a 2004 action thriller film movie starring Jean Reno, Benoît Magimel, and Christopher Lee. It is directed by Olivier Dahan and produced by Ilan Goldman, and is an international co-production of France, Italy and the United Kingdom. It is the sequel to the 2000 film The Crimson Rivers (French: Les Rivières pourpres). However, the 2000 film's creator Jean-Christophe Grangé was not creatively-involved in the sequel; instead, the movie was written by Luc Besson, whose company EuropaCorp also co-produced this movie.

== Plot ==
After a body is found in the walls of a French monastery, Commissaire Niemans, played by Jean Reno, teams up with Detective Reda, played by Benoît Magimel, who is already investigating a murder of his own. As with the first movie, the pair's investigations intertwine and soon they are looking at a giant conspiracy involving a secretive group of monks on amphetamines led by Heinrich von Garten, played by Christopher Lee, searching for a treasure hidden by King Lothair II somewhere near the Maginot-Line. Reno and Magimel are joined by a religious specialist called Marie, played by Camille Natta.

== Cast ==
- Jean Reno as Commissaire Niemans
- Benoît Magimel as Capitaine Reda
- Christopher Lee as Heinrich Von Garten
- Camille Natta as Marie
- Serge Riaboukine as Father Vincent
- Gabrielle Lazure as Philippe's Wife
- Augustin Legrand as Jésus
- Johnny Hallyday as The Blind Hermit
- Michaël Abiteboul and Eriq Ebouaney as The Cops

== Production ==
A week of filming took place at a former Benedictine priory in Lavaudieu (Haute-Loire).

Filming also took placed the Studios de Bry-sur-Marne in Bry-sur-Marne (Val-de-Marne).

The film was also partially shot in the underground passages of Pontoise (Val-d'Oise).

Other locations included the Clermont-Ferrand Auvergne Airport in Aulnat (Puy-de-Dôme) and the Intermarché supermarket in Gif-sur-Yvette (Essonne). In the Meurthe-et-Moselle department, filming took place at the metal church in Crusnes, the former Grands Bureaux de Senelle building in Herserange and the Fort de Fermont near Longuyon. In the Haute-Saône department, filming took place in Faucogney-et-la-Mer, Luxeuil-les-Bains, Froideconche and Beulotte-Saint-Laurent. Filming also took place at the Red Lands (Terres Rouges) former factory in Esch-sur-Alzette, Luxembourg, and in Bavaria, Germany.
