= Shiva (2008 film) =

- Promotional poster
- Directed by: Ronit Elkabetz; Shlomi Elkabetz
- Written by: Ronit Elkabetz; Shlomi Elkabetz
- Produced by: Guy Jacoe; Yochanan Kredo; Elie Meirovitz; Eylon Ratzkovsky; Jean-Philippe Reza; Yossi Uzrad
- Starring: Ronit Elkabetz; Albert Iluz; Yaël Abecassis; Simon Abkarian; Hana Laszlo; Moshe Ivgy; Keren Mor; Alon Abutbul
- Cinematography: Yaron Scharf
- Edited by: Joel Alexis
- Music by: Michel Korb; Sergio Leonardi
- Distributed by: Les Films du Losange (France)
- Release dates: 2 July 2008 (France); 25 September 2008 (Israel)
- Running time: 103 minutes
- Countries: Israel; France
- Languages: French; Hebrew; Moroccan Arabic

Shiva, also known as 7 Days, Seven Days and The Seven Days, is a 2008 drama film written and directed by Ronit Elkabetz and Shlomi Elkabetz. It is the second feature to be directed by the siblings following 2004's To Take a Wife. The film is the second in a trilogy focusing on the unhappy marriage of Viviane Amsalem, the first being To Take a Wife (2004). The final film of the trilogy was 2014's Gett: The Trial of Viviane Amsalem.

The film received international acclaim, winning awards at the Venice Film Festival and the Jerusalem Film Festival.

"Shiva" was filmed in late 2007 and premiered at the Cannes Film Festival's Critics' Week in May 2008, earning global praise. It later won the Wolgin Award at the Jerusalem Film Festival and two Ophir Awards for cinematography and supporting actress (Evelin Hagoel). The film also achieved success in France and Spain, where it won several awards, including best film and best actress.

== Plot ==
For seven days a large family of Moroccan descent observes the Jewish mourning ritual of shiva when a brother dies. Living together again reveals many tensions and conflicts between family members. Amid the tensions, the Gulf War rages in the background.

The plot of "Shiv'a" (The Seven Days) opens in Kiryat Yam during the Gulf War (January 1991) at the funeral of Maurice Ohayon, who died unexpectedly. Maurice's Moroccan family gathers for the traditional seven-day mourning period (shiva). The family includes Maurice’s mother, Hanina (Sulika Kadosh), his widow Ilana (Keren Mor), six brothers—Meir (Albert Iluz), Haim (Moshe Ivgy), Itamar (Alon Aboutboul), Jacky (Rafi Amzaleg), David (David Ohayon), and Charlie (Yechiel Elkabetz)—and two sisters, Simona (Hanna Azoulay Hasfari) and Vivian (Ronit Elkabetz).

== Cast ==
- Ronit Elkabetz as Vivianne
- Albert Iluz as Meir
- Yael Abecassis as Lili
- Simon Abkarian as Eliau
- Hana Laszlo as Ita
- Moshe Ivgy as Haim
- Keren Mor as Ilana
- Alon Aboutboul as Itamar

== Reception ==
The film received mixed reviews. Variety compared it unfavourably to To Take a Wife while at the same time praising the acting as "flawless". The Jerusalem Post wondered "why they ha[d] been asked to spend two hours listening to the angry resentments of a disintegrating family, even if they admire the cast and co-directors' skill..."
