= Shlomi Elkabetz =

Israeli film director and screenwriter (born 1972)

- שלומי אלקבץ
- Born: 5 December 1972 (age 53); Beersheba, Israel
- Occupations: Actor; screenwriter; film director
- Children: 1
- Relatives: Ronit Elkabetz (sister)

Shlomi Elkabetz (Hebrew: שלומי אלקבץ; born 5 December 1972) is an Israeli actor, screenwriter and film director. He is known for playing Simon in HBO's Our Boys.

== Early life ==
The Elkabetz family were Moroccan Jews who emigrated to Israel. His mother was a hairdresser, and his father was a postal employee. He was the youngest of four children, and his older sister was the late actress Ronit Elkabetz.

== Career ==
Elkabetz is best known for his Vivian Amsalem trilogy, comprising the films To Take a Wife, Shiva and Gett: The Trial of Viviane Amsalem. Elkabetz co-wrote and co-directed the films with his older sister, Ronit Elkabetz, who also starred in the films as Viviane Amsalem, an unhappy Israeli housewife trapped in a marriage with a pious man she cannot stand. The films were loosely based on the relationship between the Elkabetzs' parents.

Elkabetz also directed the 2011 film Edut, which again starred his sister.

In 2016, he produced the film In Between.

Elkabetz made his acting debut as the lead in the 2019 series Our Boys.

In September 2026, Elkabetz expressed support for filmmakers Yuval Abraham and Rachel Szor following controversy surrounding their documentary NAZA. He said that Abraham's investigative reporting raised important questions about decisions regarding targets in Gaza, adding that “these are questions that must be examined, not silenced.”

== Personal life ==
Since the age of 21, Elkabetz has split his time between Tel Aviv and Paris.

He lives in Tel Aviv with his partner Yuval and is the father of a daughter, Rene Lilian Elkabetz Dori, co-parenting with the singer Dikla.

== Awards and recognition ==
Year	Award	Film	Credits	Category	Result	Ref(s)
2015	Golden Globe Awards	Gett: The Trial of Viviane Amsalem	Director	Best Foreign Language Film	Nominated	
