= Avril (French musician) =

French composer

Fred Avril Magnon is a French composer based in Montmartre, Paris. As a singer, songwriter, and multi-instrumentalist, he won international praise for two albums that showed a strong link with cinema.

== Biography ==
Avril got his start in film music in 2008 with Hong-Kong acclaimed director Johnnie To. His quasi-musical Man Jeuk's soundtrack was nominated at both the Hong Kong Film Awards and Golden Horse Film Festival and Awards, the film being a box-office hit in China. Fred Avril won the Stockholm Music Award with Swedish film Sound of Noise (Semaine de la critique, Cannes) about "sonic bombing". He then composed the score for the indie feature "The Lifeguard" (Liz W. Garcia) with Kristen Bell, that premiered in Sundance.

Other projects featured singers Mick Harvey (former member of the Bad Seeds) and late Christophe (singer). He co-composed with Marianne Elise the song in French box-office success Connasse, Princesse des cœurs introducing Camille Cottin.

In 2018, he composed the main theme for The Hook Up Plan. The music was uploaded by fans on YouTube and was streamed more than 5 million times throughout the world before being released by Bertelsmann Music Group. Avril also writes orchestral music, such as I Am Not an Easy Man. He won the Emile Award for Best Soundtrack for an Animated Series with adult manga series Lastman.

== Film soundtracks ==
Year	Film	Director	Notes
2007	The Mad Detective	Johnnie To	
2008	Sparrow	Johnnie To	Premiered at Berlin International Film Festival 2008
2010	Sound of Noise	Johannes Stjärne Nilsson and Ola Simonsson	Premiered in Cannes Semaine de la critique 2010
2011	Attraction	Kōji Morimoto	INPI (interactive manga)
2012	Les Voies impénétrables	Maxime Govare and Noémie Saglio	Canal+
2013	The Lifeguard	Liz W. Garcia	Premiered in Sundance 2013
2014	Les Amis à vendre	Gaetan Bevernaege	Play by Gabor Rassov. Arte.
2015	Les Bêtises	Alice and Rose Philippon	End titles song performed by Christophe
2015	Rain	Johannes Stjärne Nilsson	Premiered at Seattle International Film Festival
2016	Jukai	Gabrielle Lissot	Won: Best Foreign Movie at Hong Kong International Film Festival 2016
2016	Anissa 2002	Fabienne Facco	
2018	Larguées	Eloïse Lang	Premiered in Alpe d'Huez
2018	I Am Not an Easy Man	Eleonore Pourriat	Netflix Original
2019	Pearl	Elsa Amiel	Premiered in Europe at Venice Days 2018 and in the US at Tribeca 2019
2019	Qui m'aime me suive	José Alcala	End titles song performed by Mick Harvey
2020	Un Triomphe	Emmanuel Courcol	
2023	Mars Express	Jérémie Périn	

== TV series soundtracks ==
Year	Series	Director	Notes
2017	Lastman	Jérémie Périn	26 episodes. Premiered in Annoy, 2017
2018	The Hook Up Plan	Noémie Saglio, Julien Teisseire, Chris Lang (creators)	Netflix Original
2020	Brazen	Charlotte Cambon and Phuong Mai Nguyen	Premiered in San Diego Comic-Con 2019

== Discography ==
=== Personal albums ===
- Now It's Spring (2000) (F Com)
- That Horse Must Be Starving (2002) (F Com)
- Members Only (2004) (F Com)

=== Original soundtracks ===
- Sparrow (CD, Naive 2008)
- Sound of Noise (CD, Hybris, 2010)
- Les Bêtises Cine Music Club (2014)
- Connasse, Princesse des Coeurs (CD, Milan, 2015)
- Lastman (Vinyl, Everybody On Deck, 2017) (sold out)
- I Am Not an Easy Man (Plaza Mayor, 2018)
- Pearl (Plaza Mayor, 2019)
- Qui m'aime me suive (Plaza Mayor, 2019)
- Plan Coeur (BMG US, 2019)

=== Other records ===
- Hollywood mon amour (« This Is Not America » cover featuring Juliette Lewis) (PIAS 2008)
- Nouvelle Vague Album Bande à part arrangement and production (Peacefrog 2006)
- Temposhark Invisible Ink Remix (Paper and Glue 2005)
- Olga Kouklaki, I U Need arrangement and production (EMI 2011)
- Stephan Eicher, L'Envolée composition and production p(Barclay/Universal, 2012)

== Awards and nominations ==
Year	Nominee / work	Award	Result
2002	That Horse Must Be Starving	Prix Constantin	Won
2008	Sparrow	Hong Kong International Film Festival	Nominated
2008	Sparrow	Taipei Film Festival	Nominated
2010	Sound of Noise	Stockholm Film Festival Music Award	Won
2018	Best soundtrack in an animated series in Europe for Lastman	Emile Award	Won
