= Marie-Christine Adam =

French actress (born 1950)

- Born: 24 September 1950 (age 75)
- Occupation: Actress
- Years active: 1973–present

Marie-Christine Adam (born 24 September 1950) is a French actress.

== Filmography ==
Year	Title	Role	Director	Notes
1974	Impossible... pas français		Robert Lamoureux	
1976	Commissaire Moulin	Orlane	Jacques Trébouta	TV series (1 episode)
1977	Oh Archibald	Annabel	Lazare Iglesis	TV movie
1977	Recherche dans l'intérêt des familles	Gilberte	Philippe Arnal	TV series (1 episode)
1978	Freddy	Eva De Berg	Robert Thomas	
1978	Mazarin	Madame de Longueville	Pierre Cardinal	TV mini-series
1980	Les aventures de guidon fûté	Solange	Jean-Marie Durand	
1984	Le vison voyageur	Maud Bodley	Bernard Deflandre	TV movie
1985	L'Amour braque	Marie's Mother	Andrzej Żuławski	
1987	Les 2 crocodiles	Dorothée	Joël Séria	
1990	La veuve Guillotin		Christophe Mene	Short
1990	Sweet Revenge	Salesperson	Charlotte Brändström	TV movie
1990	Le déjeuner de Sousceyrac	Hélène	Lazare Iglesis	TV movie
1990	Le Lyonnais	Anne	Joannick Desclers	TV series (1 episode)
1990	Haute tension		Joyce Buñuel	TV series (1 episode)
1990	Le mari de l'ambassadeur	Lucréce	François Velle	TV series (1 episode)
1991	Génération oxygène	Madame Burg	Georges Trillat	
1991	Mohamed Bertrand-Duval	Hélène	Alex Métayer	
1991	Les hordes	Minister Perramont	Jean-Claude Missiaen	TV mini-series
1993	Seconde B	Madame Lebrun	Patrick Taulère	TV series (1 episode)
1993	Des héros ordinaires	Claire de Vargas	Peter Kassovitz	TV series (1 episode)
1993	Une famille formidable	Alexis's Mother	Joël Santoni	TV series (1 episode)
1994	Elles n'oublient jamais	Le Guennec	Christopher Frank	
1994	Fils de flic	Irène Meyer	Igaal Niddam	TV movie
1994	Maigret	Antoinette's assistant	Joyce Buñuel	TV series (1 episode)
1994	L'instit	The principal	Philippe Triboit	TV series (1 episode)
1995	French Kiss	Juliette's Mother	Lawrence Kasdan	
1995	The Three Brothers	Sandra	Didier Bourdon & Bernard Campan	
1995	Nestor Burma		Joël Séria	TV series (1 episode)
1995	Les garçons de la plage		André Flédérick	TV series (1 episode)
1996	Fantôme avec chauffeur	Madame Berthelet	Gérard Oury	
1996	Delphine 1, Yvan 0	Delphine's Mother	Dominique Farrugia	
1996-2008	Sous le soleil	Blandine Olivier	Eric Summer, Sylvie Ayme, ...	TV series (150 episodes)
1997	Kings for a Day	The journalist	François Velle	
1997	La ballade de Titus	The Minister	Vincent De Brus	
1997	Silver Shadow		Lionel Delplanque	Short
1997	L'enfant perdu	Madame Delbac	Christian Faure	TV movie
1997	Viens jouer dans la cour des grands	Marie-Christine	Caroline Huppert	TV movie
1998	Le clone	Gwendoline	Fabio Conversi	
1998	Dormez, je le veux !		Irène Jouannet	
1998	L'annonce faite à Marius		Harmel Sbraire	
1998	Un amour de cousine	Madame Fauconnier	Pierre Joassin	TV movie
1998	H	Philippe's Mother	Édouard Molinaro	TV series (1 episode)
1998	Dossier: disparus	Madame Vidampierre	Antoine Lorenzi	TV series (1 episode)
1999	La débandade	The studied woman	Claude Berri	
1999	Les parasites	Martine Wurtz	Philippe de Chauveron	
1999	Trafic d'influence	The restaurant's owner	Dominique Farrugia	
1999	Sang-timent		Nathalie Aussant	Short
1999	Parents à mi-temps		Caroline Huppert	TV mini-series
2000	Actors		Bertrand Blier	
2000	Victoire, ou la douleur des femmes	Victoire's Lawyer	Nadine Trintignant	TV mini-series
2000	La crim'	Chantal Lourot	Dennis Berry	TV series (1 episode)
2000	Argai: The Prophecy	Orial, The Dark Queen	Jean-César Suchorski	TV series (26 episodes)
2001	La vérité si je mens ! 2	Madame Vierhouten	Thomas Gilou	
2001	Avocats & associés	President of the Court	Philippe Triboit	TV series (1 episode)
2002	Il était une 'foi'		Nathalie Aussant	Short
2002	72 heures	Sandrine Guenzi	Olivier Panchot	TV series (1 episode)
2003	Je reste !	The saleswoman	Diane Kurys	
2003	Le Divorce	Amélie Cosset	James Ivory	
2003	7 ans de mariage	Madame Moreau	Didier Bourdon	
2003	Les enfants du miracle	Nicole Duquesnoy	Sébastien Grall	TV movie
2003	Action Justice	Madame Schmidt	Alain Nahum	TV series (1 episode)
2003	Laverie de famille		Frédéric Demont	TV series (1 episode)
2004	Le plein des sens		Erick Chabot	Short
2004	Je serai toujours près de toi	Jacqueline	Claudio Tonetti	TV movie
2004	Maigret	Irène Salavin	Charles Nemes	TV series (1 episode)
2004	Navarro	Madame Rouvière	Jean Sagols	TV series (1 episode)
2004	Commissaire Valence	Madame Margairaz	Vincenzo Marano	TV series (1 episode)
2005	Au suivant !	Jo's Mother	Jeanne Biras	
2005	L'un reste, l'autre part	A guest	Claude Berri	
2006	Priceless	Madeleine	Pierre Salvadori	
2006	The Little Book of Revenge	Damaris	Jean-François Pouliot	
2006	Nos amis les parents	Toinette	Philippe Proteau	TV movie
2007	Suspectes	Hélène Evan	Laurent Dussaux	TV mini-series
2007	La lance de la destinée	Catherine Beranger	Dennis Berry	TV mini-series
2007	Les Bleus	Madame Magnard	Vincent Monnet	TV series (1 episode)
2008	Disco	The hiring manager	Fabien Onteniente	
2008	Love Me No More	Cécile's Mother	Jean Becker	
2008	Paul Rondin est... Paul Rondin	The marriage agency director	Frédérick Vin	Short
2009	Neuilly Yo Mama!	Guilain's Mother	Gabriel Julien-Laferrière	
2009	Bank Error in Your Favour	Madame Brière	Gérard Bitton & Michel Munz	
2009	Global Warming	Madame Maesmaker	Christophe Mercier	Short
2009	Sœur Thérèse.com	Madame Poivre	Vincenzo Marano	TV series (1 episode)
2010	Demain je me marie	Héléne	Vincent Giovanni	TV movie
2010	Le Roi, l'Écureuil et la Couleuvre	Marie De Maupéou	Laurent Heynemann	TV series (2 episodes)
2010	Les invincibles	Thérèse Boisvert	Pierric Gantelmi d'Ille & Alexandre Castagnetti	TV series (6 episodes)
2011	La Chance de ma vie	Dominique	Nicolas Cuche	
2011	Moi et ses ex	Alice's Mother	Vincent Giovanni	TV movie
2012	Capital	Diane's Mother	Costa-Gavras	
2012	Paris Manhattan	Nicole Ovitz	Sophie Lellouche	
2012	Another Woman's Life	Babouchka Speranski	Sylvie Testud	
2012	L'homme de ses rêves	Carole	Christophe Douchand	TV movie
2012	Les voies impénétrables	Mother Yvonne	Maxime Govare & Noémie Saglio	TV movie
2012	La victoire au bout du bâton	Louise	Jean-Michel Verner	TV movie
2012	Chambre 327	Hélène Marsac	Benoît d'Aubert	TV mini-series
2012	Fais pas ci, fais pas ça	The owner	Gabriel Julien-Laferrière	TV series (1 episode)
2013	The Scapegoat	Miss Hamilton	Nicolas Bary	
2013	J'adore ma vie !	Annie	Stéphane Kurc	TV movie
2014	Prêt à tout	Irène	Nicolas Cuche	
2014	Beau papa	Mother-in-law	Victor Saint Macary	Short
2014	Baby Phone	Monique	Olivier Casas	Short
2014	Bébé à tout prix	Grandmother	Guillaume Clicquot de Mentque	Short
2014	Ça va passer... Mais quand ?	Jeanne	Stéphane Kappes	TV movie
2014	Commissaire Magellan	Colette Landowski	Emmanuel Rigaut	TV series (1 episode)
2014	Josephine, Guardian Angel	Sylvie	Jean-Marc Seban	TV series (1 episode)
2014	R.I.S, police scientifique	Madame Duringer	Olivier Barma	TV series (1 episode)
2014-2015	Mes chers disparus!	Madame Rebec	Stéphane Kappes	TV series (6 episodes)
2015	Connasse, Princesse des cœurs	The Mother	Eloïse Lang & Noémie Saglio	
2015	Chez Victoire: Nouvelle Vie	Madeleine	Vincenzo Marano	TV movie
2015	Le secret d'Elise	Ariane Letilleul	Alexandre Laurent	TV mini-series
2015	Section de recherches	Madame Carioux	Didier Delaître	TV series (1 episode)
2015	L'amour à 200 mètres	The mother	Pierre Lacan	TV series (1 episode)
2015-2021	Nina	Gloria Auber	Eric Le Roux, Hervé Brami, ...	TV series (42 episodes)
2016	Les liens du coeur	Marie-Claude	Régis Musset	TV movie
2017	Baby Phone	Monique	Olivier Casas	
2017	Pochette surprise	Nicole	François Uzan	Short
2017	A Whole World for a Little World	Prince's Mother	Fabrice Bracq	Short
2019	A Good Doctor	Madame Schneider	Tristan Séguéla	
2019	Joyeuse retraite!	Madame Conelllas	Fabrice Bracq	
2019	On a Magical Night	Maria's Mother	Christophe Honoré	
2019	Luisa		Kaan Alptekin	Short
2019	Ten minutes tops	Maître Pochard	Antoine de Bujadoux	Short
2019	Le partage de la Cigogne	Camille Renoir	Mickaël Cohen	Short
2019	Tropiques criminels	Isabelle	Stéphane Kappes	TV series (1 episode)
2020	La tirailleuse sénégalaise	Amandine	Laurent Firode	Short
2020-2021	Plus belle la vie	Marie-Christine Walter	Nath Dumont, Frantz Koenig, ...	TV series (16 episodes)
2021	Or de lui	Lise	Baptiste Lorber	TV mini series (5 Episode)
2022	Inventing Anna	Marie Christine Adam		TV mini series (1 episode)
2023	Little Girl Blue	Florence Malraux	Mona Achache	

== Theatre ==
Year	Title	Author	Director
1973	Le bonheur des autres	Robert Favart	Jacques Sereys
1974	Quand épousez-vous ma femme?	Jean Bernard-Luc & Jean-Pierre Conty	Michel Modo
1975	The Idiot	Fyodor Dostoevsky	Michel Vitold
1976	Bobosse	André Roussin	Dominique Paturel
1977	Au plaisir Madame	Philippe Bouvard	Jean-Marie Rivière
1977	Our Lord's Vineyard	Robert de Flers & Francis de Croisset	Jean-Marie Rivière
1978	Simon le bienheureux	Simon Gray	Michel Fagadau
1978	Boeing-Boeing	Marc Camoletti	Michel Fagadau
1979	Tartuffe	Molière	Jean Périmony
1979	Une nuit chez vous Madame	Jean de Létraz	Jacques Vallois
1980	The Miser	Molière	Philippe Brigaud
1980	Docteur Glass	Michel Perrein	Jacques Vallois
1981	The Italian Straw Hat	Eugène Marin Labiche & Marc-Michel	Guy Kayat
1983	Le Vison voyageur	Ray Cooney & John Chapman	Jacques Sereys
1984	Deux hommes dans une valise	Peter Yeldham & Donald Churchill	Jean-Luc Moreau
1985	Quadrille	Sacha Guitry	Raymond Pellegrin
1990	Romeo and Juliet	William Shakespeare	Jean-Paul Lucet
1991	Five Modern Noh Plays	Yukio Mishima	Jean-Louis Bihoreau
1991	Les caïmans sont des gens comme les autres	Pierre Pelot & Christian Rauth	Jean-Christian Grinevald
1992	The Homecoming	Harold Pinter	Claude Lesko
2001-2002	It Runs in the Family	Ray Cooney	Jean-Luc Moreau
2009	Actes manqués	Henri Guybet	Annick Blancheteau
