= I Kissed a Girl (disambiguation) =

"I Kissed a Girl" is a 2008 song by Katy Perry.

I Kissed a Girl may also refer to:

- "I Kissed a Girl" (Jill Sobule song), released in 1995
- "I Kissed a Girl" (Glee), the seventh episode from the third season of the Glee television series, released in 2011
- I Kissed a Girl (film), a 2015 French comedy film
- I Kissed a Girl (TV series), a 2024 British television series
