= Ladies First (2026 film) =

Film by Thea Sharrock

- Official release poster
- Directed by: Thea Sharrock
- Screenplay by: Natalie Krinsky; Cinco Paul; Katie Silberman
- Based on: I Am Not an Easy Man by Éléonore Pourriat
- Produced by: Liza Chasin; Eleonore Dailly; Edouard de Lachomette
- Starring: Sacha Baron Cohen; Rosamund Pike; Charles Dance; Emily Mortimer; Tom Davis; Richard E. Grant; Fiona Shaw
- Cinematography: Haris Zambarloukos
- Edited by: Mark Everson
- Music by: Atli Örvarsson
- Production company: 3dot Productions
- Distributed by: Netflix
- Release date: May 22, 2026
- Running time: 93 minutes
- Country: United States
- Language: English

Ladies First is a 2026 American comedy film directed by Thea Sharrock. It is inspired by the 2018 French film I Am Not an Easy Man by Éléonore Pourriat. It stars Sacha Baron Cohen, Rosamund Pike, Charles Dance, Emily Mortimer, Tom Davis, Richard E. Grant, and Fiona Shaw. It centers around male chauvinist Damien (Baron Cohen) learning how sexual discrimination feels when transports him into a matriarchal society, where he faces Alex (Pike), a female adversary matching his ruthlessness.

It was released on Netflix on May 22, 2026 and received negative reviews from critics.

== Plot ==
Executive Damien Sachs is wealthy and chauvinistic, working for advertising agency Atlas which is bidding for Guinness’s stout campaign for women. When the client expresses disapproval of the agency's lack of women in power, Damien dishonestly claims a female creative director was recently promoted.

Pleased, Atlas CEO Fred reveals he is considering Damien to replace him upon his retirement. Damien tasks his assistant Ruby to find any woman to promote to cover him. Hardworking, single mother Alex Fox is chosen, a 20-year employee constantly overlooked for being female.

However, Alex soon sees the Damien-led male staff ignore her, while pitching sexist ideas for Guinness. Later, she overhears why she was promoted. Disgusted, Alex quits, after Damien claims men have more difficulties in the workplace than women.

Damien follows Alex out, listing women's deficiencies, then accidentally knocks himself out. Awakening, the world has transformed into a matriarchy. Returning to Atlas, everything is changed: Damien and Alex have swapped roles; Ruby is an executive; Fred is a meek assistant, his previous assistant Felicity is CEO; and the cleaner Glenda is now a chair on the board. Damien’s parents, sister Sunny, and her family, have also changed personalities.

A mysterious 'Pigeon Man' later approaches Damien. Having arrived in the matriarchal world nine years ago, and having seen men escape, he tells Damien that, to revert to normalcy, he must navigate this new world to become Atlas' CEO. Arrogantly believing he can do this easily, Damien unsuccessfully flirts with Felicity. Then, at a creative meeting for Guinness wines for men, Alex leads the women pitching sexist concepts.

Sunny suggests Damien would be taken more seriously if women felt attracted to him. Having undergone a massive makeover in clothes, diet and excess hair removal, he finds Felicity is visibly attracted to him. She invites him to the meeting with Guinness’ male CEO, alongside Alex. Felicity inadvertently offends the CEO with sexist rhetoric, while Alex wins him over. Felicity invites Damien to an evening ‘meeting' at her home, where she propositions him in a bathrobe; he reluctantly dances for her dressed as a cowboy, only for her to die upon reaching orgasm.

At Felicity's funeral, Damien hears Glenda will select the new CEO at a weekend get-together. He invites himself over, impresses Glenda by playing piano and singing Ginuwine's "Pony," then goes drinking with her and Alex.

Glenda holds a meeting, inviting pitches on Atlas’ future. As Damien starts his pitch on the need for change that impresses Glenda, Alex’s daughter Charlie calls with a dental emergency. Damien offers to get her an appointment with his dentist sister, Sonny, partially to get Alex out of the way. She agrees, but insists Damien accompany her.

During the car ride they argue about who deserves the CEO position, but also begin respecting each other. Despite both claiming to be heading home after the appointment, they both return to Glenda's. Damien and Alex's argument turns passionate, so they sleep together. The next morning, he awakens to find her trying to quietly leave, as he often used to do. While talking, Alex is notified that she has been named the new Atlas CEO. Frustrated, Damien complains how the world works against men; Alex immediately fires him.

Sunny's husband Chris encourages Damien to see a lawyer, who says he has a case for a wrongful dismissal suit against Alex and Atlas. While the lawsuit negatively affects Atlas's business, Damien refuses to reveal he and Alex had sex, which keeps it from moving forward. When Alex finds out, she realizes she has feelings for Damien, and rushes to see him. However, while talking, Alex discovers that Damien will be given the CEO job instead of her. Moments later, he falls and hits his head, awakening back in his own world. Damien rushes back to Atlas a changed man, focused on giving the women at the company more opportunities and admonishing Fred for his philandering.

Damien then visits Alex at home, apologizing for his treatment of her, offering to rehire her with a better salary, and ceding his office to her. She agrees to return, and her idea for the Guinness campaign is a massive, award-winning success. Meanwhile, the Pigeon Man shares Damien's story with Fred, who has become the latest to be pulled into the women-first world.

== Cast ==
- Sacha Baron Cohen as Damien Sachs
- Rosamund Pike as Alex Fox
- Tom Davis as Chris Black, Sunny's husband
- Emily Mortimer as Sunny Black
- Weruche Opia as Ruby, Damien's secretary
- Charles Dance as Fred Powell
- Fiona Shaw as Felicity Chase
- Richard E. Grant as Pigeon Man
- Red Tennant as Charlie
- Kathryn Hunter as Glenda Cartwright
- Kadiff Kirwan as Austin
- Bill Paterson as Louis
- Paul Chahidi as Harry
- Jordan Metcalfe as Marlon
- Danny Ashok as Nick
- Dani Moseley as Lauren
- Maddie Rice as Kirsty
- Ron Cook as Mr Sachs
- Deborah Findlay as Mrs Sachs

== Production ==
Ladies First is inspired by the 2018 French film I Am Not an Easy Man (French: Je ne suis pas un homme facile), written and directed by Éléonore Pourriat. It is written by Natalie Krinsky, Katie Silberman, and Cinco Paul and directed by Thea Sharrock. It was produced by Liza Chasin of 3dot Productions, under her partnership with Netflix. Eleonore Dailly, Edouard de Lachomette and Four By Two Films also produced the film.

Filming began in November 2024, taking place primarily at Shepperton Studios in Surrey, England. The production was expected to run through January 2025. Filming locations also included London's Financial District and Hampstead.

Atli Örvarsson was hired to compose the score for the film.

== Release ==
Ladies First was released on Netflix on May 22, 2026.

== Reception ==
On the review aggregator website Rotten Tomatoes, 26% of 47 critics' reviews are positive, with an average rating of 3.8/10. The website's consensus reads: "A subversion of gender roles that feels outdated upon arrival, Ladies First's topsy-turvy fantasy is too cloying to wring many laughs from the battle of the sexes." Metacritic, which uses a weighted average, assigned the film a score of 38 out of 100, based on 11 critics, indicating "generally unfavorable" reviews.

Benjamin Lee of The Guardian gave the film 1/5 stars, describing it as "an excruciatingly unfunny high-concept thought experiment" and "a criminal waste of talent, a murderer's row of actors who hopefully got paid handsomely for the embarrassment of this whiffing up their IMDb pages", summarising the film as "unashamedly silly [...] tiresomely un-fun and, by the end, laughably earnest". Robbie Collin of The Daily Telegraph gave it 2/5 stars, writing, "The dreary plot which eventually kicks in, and has Baron Cohen and Pike vying for a promotion, feels like something cut from one of the weaker Bridget Jones films – albeit shot in that odd Netflix house style that somehow looks simultaneously expensive and cheap." Variety's Todd Gilchrist wrote, "the most interesting read on Ladies First is a metatextual one, where [Baron] Cohen's most famous creation, the cheerfully chauvinistic Borat, gets emotionally vivisected by Pike's calculating Gone Girl character, Amy Dunne."
