= Liza Chasin =

American film producer

Liza Chasin is an American film producer. She is the president of the American production company 3dot Productions.

== Life and career ==
Chasin is a graduate of NYU Film School. Prior to joining Working Title Films, Chasin worked for several years in various production capacities in New York-based production companies. She first joined Working Title in 1991, serving as a Director of Development. She was later promoted to Vice President of Production and Development, becoming the head of the company in Los Angeles. During her term, Chasin oversaw the company's creative affairs in the United States. Chasin later became president of the company in 1996, and has been involved in the development and production of the company's most acclaimed films. In October 2017, after 26 years at Working Title Films, Chasin announced she would be leaving at year end. In March 2018, Chasin announced she was launching 3dot Productions, signs a first-look TV overall deal with Anonymous Content and Paramount Television Studios. More recently, Chasin signed a first-look TV deal with Endeavor Content.

She is married to Matthew Velkes, the COO at Anonymous Content. She and her husband are members of the Wilshire Boulevard Temple.

== Filmography ==
- Everest (2015)
- Baby Driver (2017)
- Darkest Hour (2017)
- Victoria & Abdul (2017)
- The Snowman (2017)
- Mary Queen of Scots (2018)
- Yesterday (2019)
- Cats (2019)
- Stillwater (2021)
- The Lost City (2022)
- The Friend (2024)
- Ladies First (2026)
