= Mars Express (film) =

2023 film by Jérémie Périn

- Theatrical release poster
- Directed by: Jérémie Périn
- Written by: Laurent Sarfati; Jérémie Périn
- Produced by: Didier Creste
- Starring: Léa Drucker; Mathieu Amalric; Daniel Njo Lobé; Marie Bouvet; Sébastien Chassagne; Marthe Keller
- Edited by: Lila Desiles
- Music by: Fred Avril; Philippe Monthaye
- Production companies: Everybody on Deck; Je Suis Bien Content; EV.L Prod; Plume Finance; France 3 Cinéma; Shine Conseils; Gebeka Films; Amopix
- Distributed by: Gebeka Films
- Release dates: 23 May 2023 (Cannes); 22 November 2023 (France)
- Running time: 89 minutes
- Country: France
- Language: French
- Budget: €9 million
- Box office: $1.5 million

Mars Express is a 2023 French animated science fiction thriller film directed by Jérémie Périn, and Perin's first feature film. The film premiered at the Cannes Film Festival on 5 May 2023 and was released theatrically in France on 22 November.

== Premise ==
The story takes place in the 23rd century on Mars. Aline Ruby and her android partner Carlos Rivera are private investigators tasked with solving a case where two students at an elite university are reported missing.

== Plot ==
In 2200, Aline Ruby, a private detective, and Carlos Rivera, an android replica of her partner who died five years earlier, are sent to Earth to capture Roberta Williams, a robot-hacking criminal. Back on Mars, Roberta's arrest warrant has disappeared and she is released.

A new investigation is entrusted to the duo: to track down Jun Chow, a cybernetics student known for illegally jailbreaking androids. Jun, like her roommate, has gone missing. Aline and Carlos venture to the depths of Noctis, the main terrestrial establishment of Mars created thanks to the progress of robotics, and where humans and various forms of androids seem to coexist in harmony.

The city turns out to hide secrets such as trafficking and clandestine computer labs. Meanwhile, activists try to free the robots from the security constraints that bind them to humans.

Ultimately, the robots are successfully emancipated and revolt, but peacefully, by uploading their consciousnesses to computers aboard spaceships and thus escaping to space. Carlos, grief-stricken by the loss of his partner and realizing that he is a dead consciousness embodied in a machine who has been "trying to hold onto a life that's moved on without him", decides to go with the robots.

== Voice cast ==
- Léa Drucker as Aline Ruby
- Mathieu Amalric as Chris Royjacker
- Daniel Njo Lobé as Carlos Rivera
- Marie Bouvet as Roberta Williams
- Sébastien Chassagne as Inspector Simon Gordaux
- Marthe Keller as Beryl
- Geneviève Doang as Jun Chow
- Thomas Roditi as LEM
- Usul as the professor

== Influences and inspiration ==
Mars Express is the first feature film of Jérémie Périn, a French animator known for the 2016 animated TV series Lastman. Périn said he was inspired by hard-boiled film noir detectives in movies such as Chinatown, The Long Goodbye, Kiss Me Deadly, and Point Blank. Since the protagonists of those were all men he wanted to see the differences when a woman was put in the main role.

Périn said he was also inspired by movies in which the protagonist realizes that they are in a conspiracy that is too big for them, such as Three Days of the Condor, All the President's Men, The Parallax View, Blow Out, and The Conversation.

In addition to live action films, Périn cited Ghost in the Shell, The Rose of Versailles, Space Adventure Cobra, and Patlabor 2: The Movie as his personal favorite anime and influences on his work.

The inspiration for the organic machines and weapons in the film came from Périn hearing that Google was working on technology for skin cells. This led to the idea that ultimately tech would complete a full circle back to organics, something "close to us, but at the same time, they are monsters". He also tied the replacement of the robots with organics to planned obsolescence, which he wanted to lampoon.

== Production ==
Mars Express is an Everybody on Deck production. It had a €9 million budget.

== Release ==
The film premiered in the Cinéma de la Plage section of the 76th Cannes Film Festival on 23 May 2023. It also made it to the competitive slate of the Annecy International Animation Film Festival. It was released theatrically in France on 22 November 2023 by Gebeka Films. GKIDS acquired the film's North American rights and released it on 3 May 2024 with both its original French language and an English dub.

The film was released by GKIDS in North America on both digital and Blu-ray formats on 18 June 2024.

On 8 May 2025, the film got a UK theatrical release after being picked up by the distributor Beam Films.

On 30 January 2026, the film got a theatrical release for Japan.

== Reception ==
=== Critical response ===
On the review aggregator website Rotten Tomatoes, 100% of 27 critics' reviews are positive, with an average rating of 7.7/10.

Rafael Motamayor of /Film rated the film 8 out of 10 points, writing it "works because even its most outlandish and complex sci-fi concept is grounded in human drama".

Wendy Ide of Screen Daily deemed the film to be "striking and timely animation".

Toussaint Egan of Polygon called the film "the best animated movie of the year you probably haven't seen or heard about yet." In an interview with Périn, Egan describes the film as "a sophisticated, hard-boiled detective story set in a futuristic society where humans and robots live side by side"

=== Accolades ===
Award	Date of ceremony	Category	Recipient(s)	Result	Ref.
Lumière Awards	22 January 2024	Best Animated Film	Mars Express	Nominated	
Paris Film Critics Association Awards	4 February 2024	Best Animated Film	Mars Express	Won	
International Cinephile Society	11 February 2024	Best Animated Film	Mars Express	Nominated	
César Awards	23 February 2024	Best Animated Film	Mars Express	Nominated	

== See also ==
- List of films set on Mars
- List of French films of 2023
