= Baby Bumps =

2017 film by Noémie Saglio

Baby Bump(s)
- Theatrical release poster
- French: Telle mère, telle fille
- Directed by: Noémie Saglio
- Written by: Noémie Saglio; Agathe Pastorino
- Produced by: Camille Gentet
- Starring: Juliette Binoche; Camille Cottin; Lambert Wilson; Catherine Jacob; Michael Dichter; Stéfi Celma; Philippe Vieux; Olivia Côte; Hugues Jourdain; Charlie Dupont; Jana Bittnerova; Thierry Simon
- Cinematography: Pierre Aïm
- Edited by: Sandro Lavezzi
- Music by: M
- Production companies: Flamme Films; Gaumont; France 2 Cinéma
- Distributed by: Gaumont
- Release date: 29 March 2017
- Running time: 94 minutes
- Country: France
- Language: French
- Budget: €6.7 million
- Box office: $1.4 million

Baby Bump(s) (French: Telle mère, telle fille, lit. 'Like Mother, Like Daughter') is a 2017 French comedy film co-written and directed by Noémie Saglio.

== Premise ==
A mother and her daughter, completely opposite, become pregnant simultaneously.

== Cast ==
- Juliette Binoche as Mado
- Camille Cottin as Avril
- Lambert Wilson as Marc
- Catherine Jacob as Irène
- Jean-Luc Bideau as Debulac
- Michael Dichter as Louis
- Stéfi Celma as Charlotte
- Philippe Vieux as Michel
- Olivia Côte as Cécile
- Charlie Dupont as Romain
- Hugues Jourdain as Eudes
- Sabine Pakora as Justine

== Production ==
The film was shot from 13 June to 5 August 2016.
