= Camille Cottin =

French stage, television and film actress (born 1978)

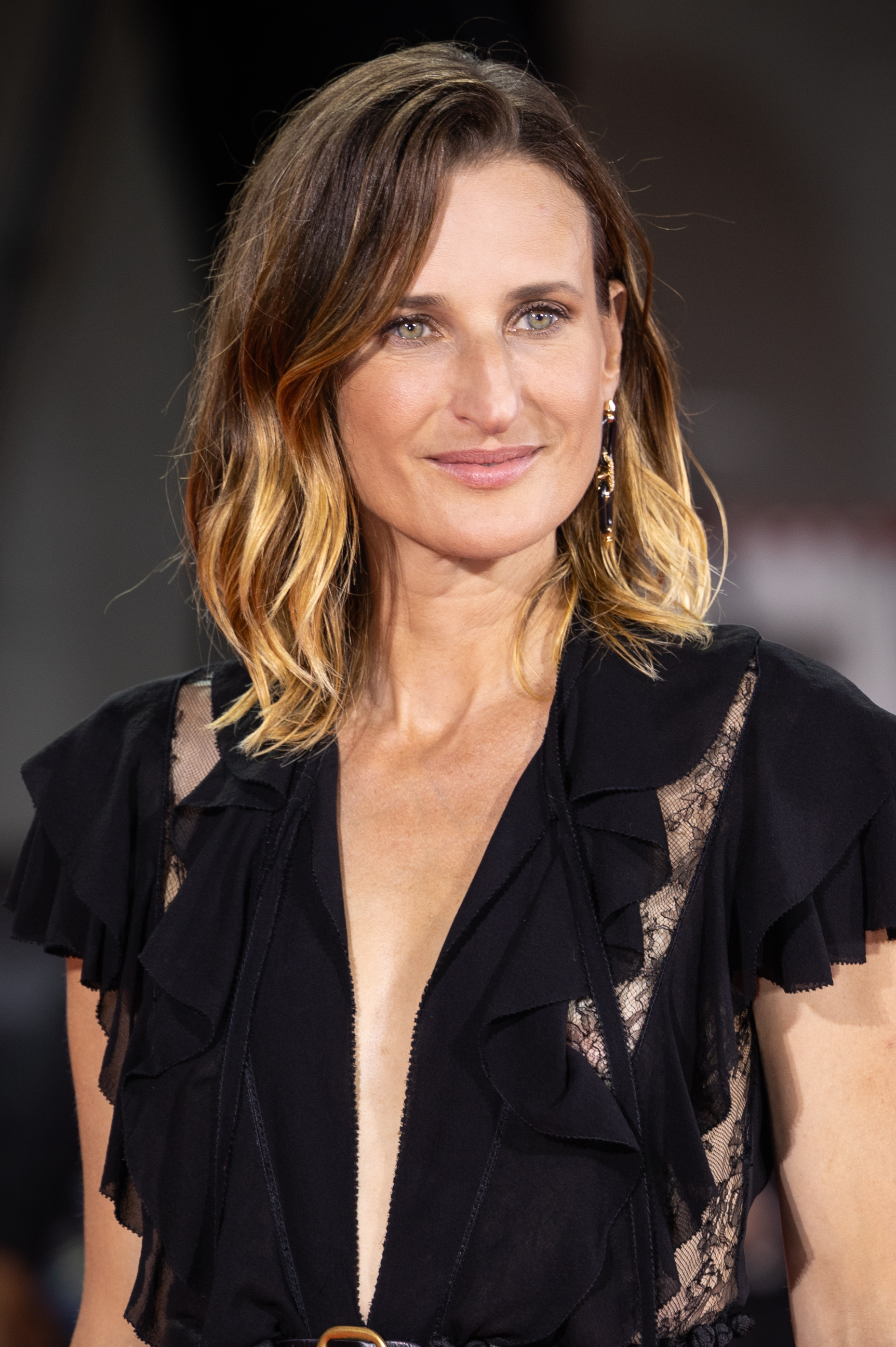
- Cottin at the 81st Venice International Film Festival in 2024
- Born: Camille Juliette Éloïse Cottin; 1 December 1978 (age 47); Boulogne-Billancourt, France
- Occupation: Actress
- Years active: 1997–present
- Notable credit(s): Connasse; The Parisian Bitch, Princess of Hearts; Call My Agent! The Dazzled
- Partner: Benjamin Mahon (2005–present)
- Children: 2

Camille Juliette Éloïse Cottin (French: [kamij kɔtɛ̃]; born 1 December 1978) is a French actress and comedian.

Following her debut as a stage actress, she became known in 2013 for playing a capricious Parisian woman in the Canal+ hidden camera-sketches series Connasse (2013–2015), as well as in the theatrical film based on the series The Parisian Bitch, Princess of Hearts (2015), which brought her significant mainstream success in France. She received a nomination for the César Award for Most Promising Actress for the role. Cottin's international recognition grew with the role of Andréa Martel in the France 2 drama series Call My Agent! (2015–2020).

She subsequently had leading roles in films such as Baby Bumps (2017), The Mystery of Henri Pick (2019), The Dazzled (2019), and Toni, en famille (2023). She made her English-language debut in Robert Zemeckis's thriller film Allied (2016), followed by the BBC America drama series Killing Eve (2020–2022). In 2021, she starred opposite Matt Damon in Stillwater and in Ridley Scott's biographical crime film House of Gucci.

== Early life ==
Cottin's mother's family is Jewish. Her mother's family was "pieds-noirs," French citizens living in Algeria when Algeria was still a French colony. Some of her early years were spent in Boulogne-Billancourt, near Paris, but she spent her teenage years in London before returning to France, where she became a high school English teacher. At the same time, she took classes at a theatre and dramatic art school and then with the company "Théâtre du Voyageur".

== Career ==
Cottin played small roles in multiple films and television series. In 2009, she joined the "Troupe à Palmade". She appeared the same year in an advertisement for a Japanese telephone, directed by Wes Anderson with Brad Pitt, with music by Serge Gainsbourg with the song "Poupée de cire, poupée de son" sung by France Gall.

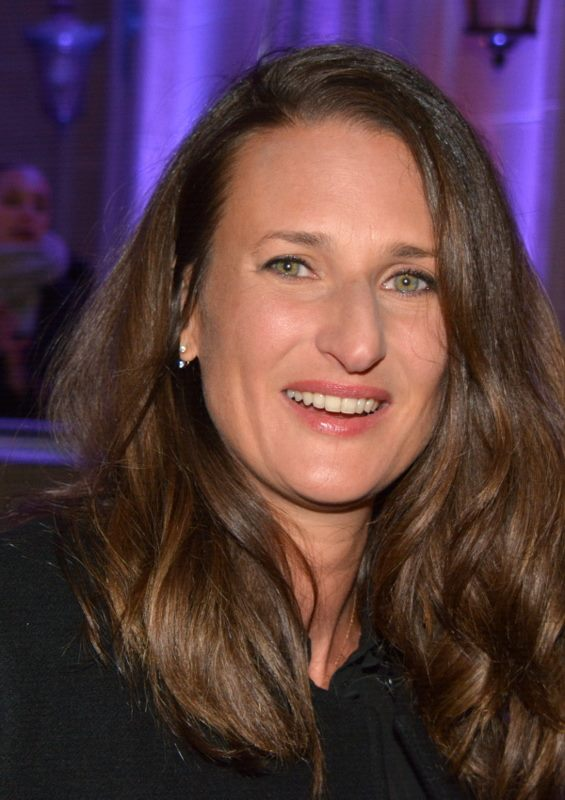
Cottin in 2016

In 2013, she played the main role in Connasse on Canal+ produced by Silex Films, a series consisting of sketches in candid camera of less than two minutes each. Written by Noémie Saglio and Éloïse Lang, the episodes were broadcast on Le Grand Journal and became available on DVD from 4 March 2014. She later appeared in the film based on the series titled The Parisian Bitch, Princess of Hearts, released in 2015.

In 2015, Cottin played the lead role of agent Andréa Martel in Call My Agent!, a television series which has run for four seasons (a fifth season and a movie are planned) that was first broadcast on France 2 and which later enjoyed wide international distribution on Netflix; Cottin won a Best Actress ACS Award for her role. In 2016, Cottin appeared in Allied, In the Shadow of Iris and The Fabulous Patars.

In 2022, she joined the cast of the mystery film A Haunting in Venice, directed by Kenneth Branagh. Greg Nussen writing for the Slant Magazine, praised Cottin's performance, stating that it was "surprisingly vulnerable".

In 2023, she had a role in the film Golda, a movie about Golda Meir and the Yom Kippur War.

== Personal life ==
Cottin is the daughter of artist Gilles Cottin. Her great-great-grandfather was historian Paul Cottin, former director of Bibliotheque de l'Arsenal.

Cottin has been in a relationship with architect Benjamin Mahon since 2005. They have two children, a son born in 2009, and a daughter born in August 2015. Cottin and Mahon are not married. Cottin said she is against marriage. "Even if I plan to spend the rest of my life with him, I want to feel this share of freedom that previous generations have allowed us to acquire. This possibility of saying: "If I am not happy, I leave."

== Filmography ==
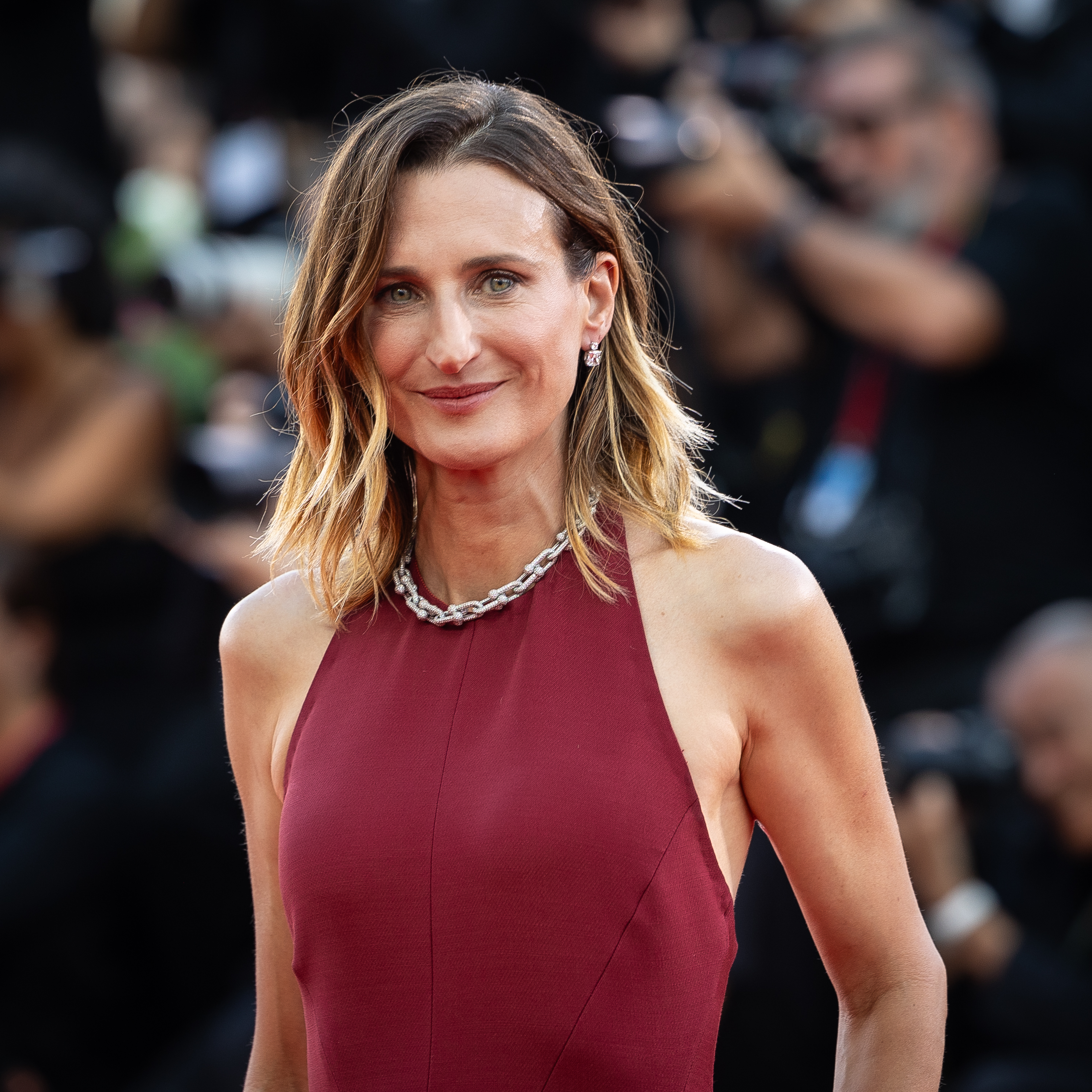
Cottin at the 81st Venice International Film Festival

=== Film ===
Key
†	Denotes productions that have not yet been released

Year	Title	Role	Notes or original title
2001	Yamakasi	—N/a	Background actress, uncredited
2006	Odile...	A woman	Short film
2009	Le problème avec Tom	Anne	Short film
2011	Bernard & Fils, suicideurs à domicile	Pénélope	Short film
2011	Il était une fois, une fois	Juliette's mother	
2012	Mon troquet	A woman	Short film
2014	Gazelles	Émilie	Les gazelles
2015	I Kissed a Girl	Clémence	Toute première fois
2015	The Parisian Bitch, Princess of Hearts	Camilla, la "Connasse"	Connasse, Princesse des cœurs
2015	Buddy Guards	Émilie	Les Gorilles
2015	Our Futures	Géraldine	Nos futurs
2016	In the Shadow of Iris	Chief Nathalie Vasseur	Iris
2016	The Fabulous Patars	Séverine Grellot	Cigarettes et Chocolat chaud
2016	Allied	Monique	English-language film debut
2016	Ballerina	Félicie Le Bras (voice)	French dubbing
2017	Baby Bumps	Avril	Telle mère, telle fille
2018	Dumped	Rose	Larguées
2018	Photo de famille	Elsa	
2019	Our Happy Holiday	Fleur	Premières vacances
2019	Savage	Detective Camus	Les Fauves
2019	The Mystery of Henri Pick	Joséphine Pick	Le Mystère Henri Pick
2019	On a Magical Night	Irène Haffner at 40 years old	Chambre 212
2019	Someone, Somewhere	Mélanie's psychologist	Deux moi
2019	The Dazzled	Christine Lourmel	Les Éblouis
2020	Little Vampire	Madame Pandora (voice)	Petit Vampire; Original dubbing
2020	Soul	22 (voice)	French dubbing
2021	22 vs. Earth	22 (voice)	Short film, French dubbing
2021	Stillwater	Virginie	
2021	Our Men	Céline	Mon légionnaire
2021	House of Gucci	Paola Franchi	
2022	Valiant Hearts	Rose	Cœurs vaillants
2022	Icarus	Ariane (voice)	Icare; Original dubbing
2023	Toni, en famille	Antonia "Toni" Livesi	
2023	A Haunting in Venice	Olga Seminoff	
2023	Golda	Lou Kaddar	
2024	The Art of Nothing	Cécile Fouasse-Demaupré	
2024	The Empire	The Queen	
2024	Three Friends	Alice	
2025	Out of Love	Jeanne	Les enfants vont bien. It competed for Crystal Globe at the KVIFF.
2025	In the Land of Arto	Céline	Le Pays d'Arto. It opened Locarno on 6 August.
2026	Les Misérables	Thénardiers	Adaptation of Les Misérables by Victor Hugo

=== Television ===
Year	Title	Role	Notes or original title
2002	Hep taxi	A customer	Episode: "On s'appelle!"
2003	Domisiladoré	A woman	1 episode
2005	Tango Overlord	Young French woman	Short television film
2006	Ladies of the Law	Maniac Victim	Femmes de loi; Episode: "Promotion mortelle"
2006	PJ	Annabelle	Episode: "Parole malheureuse"
2007	La Commune	Albane Devlay	Episode: "Compassion"
2008	PJ	Mina Ferlet	Episode: "Effets sonores"
2010	Fracture	Slimane's neighbor	Television film
2011–2013	Scènes de ménages	Camille	6 episodes
2012	Mange	The psychologist	Television film
2012	Le Jour où tout a basculé	Annick	Episode: "Mon patron veut briser mon couple"
2012	Le Jour où tout a basculé	Lucie	Episode: "Ma femme me trompe avec mon meilleur ami"
2013	Pep's	Marina Trufaine	Main role (season 1)
2013–2015	Connasse	La "Connasse"	Main role
2013	Vaugand	A woman	Episode: "La Place du Mort"
2013	Ma Meuf	Sophie	Main role
2015–2020	Call My Agent!	Andréa Martel	Dix pour cent; Main role
2017	Calls	Gabriel's mother (voice)	Episode: "2027 – Sources multiples (Servon / France)"
2019	Mouche	Mouche	Main role
2020–2022	Killing Eve	Hélène	Main role (seasons 3–4); English-language television debut
2023	Star Wars: Visions	Loi'e (voice)	Episode: "The Spy Dancer"
2023	Brassic	Fiona Frank	Season 5

== Awards and nominations ==
Year	Award	Category	Work	Result
2016	César Awards	Most Promising Actress	The Parisian Bitch, Princess of Hearts	Nominated
2016	ACS Awards	Best Actress	Call My Agent!	Won
2017	ACS Awards	Best Actress	Call My Agent!	Won
2018	Alpe d'Huez International Comedy Film Festival	Best Acting	Larguées	Won
2019	Globes de Cristal Awards	Best Television Drama Actress	Call My Agent!	Won
2019	Globes de Cristal Awards	Best Comedy Actress	Larguées	Nominated
2020	Globes de Cristal Awards	Best Comedy Actress	The Mystery of Henri Pick	Nominated

== Honours ==
- Knight of the Legion of Honour (2025)
