= A Woman Called Golda =

1982 biographical television film by Alan Gibson

- Ingrid Bergman in A Woman Called Golda
- Genre: Biography; Drama; History
- Written by: Harold Gast; Steve Gethers
- Directed by: Alan Gibson
- Starring: Ingrid Bergman; Ned Beatty; Franklin Cover; Judy Davis; Anne Jackson; Robert Loggia; Leonard Nimoy; Jack Thompson
- Theme music composer: Michel Legrand
- Original language: English

Production
- Executive producer: Harve Bennett
- Producers: Gene Corman; Lynn Guthrie
- Cinematography: Adam Greenberg
- Editor: Robert F. Shugrue
- Running time: 240 minutes
- Production companies: Harve Bennett Productions; Paramount Television Domestic Distribution

Original release
- Network: Syndication
- Release: April 26, 1982

A Woman Called Golda is a 1982 American made-for-television film biopic of Israeli Prime Minister Golda Meir directed by Alan Gibson and starring Ingrid Bergman in what would become the final production she would star in before her death. It also features Ned Beatty, Franklin Cover, Judy Davis, Anne Jackson, Robert Loggia, Leonard Nimoy, and Jack Thompson.

A Woman Called Golda was produced by Paramount Domestic Television for syndication and was distributed by Operation Prime Time. The film premiered on April 26, 1982.

== Plot ==
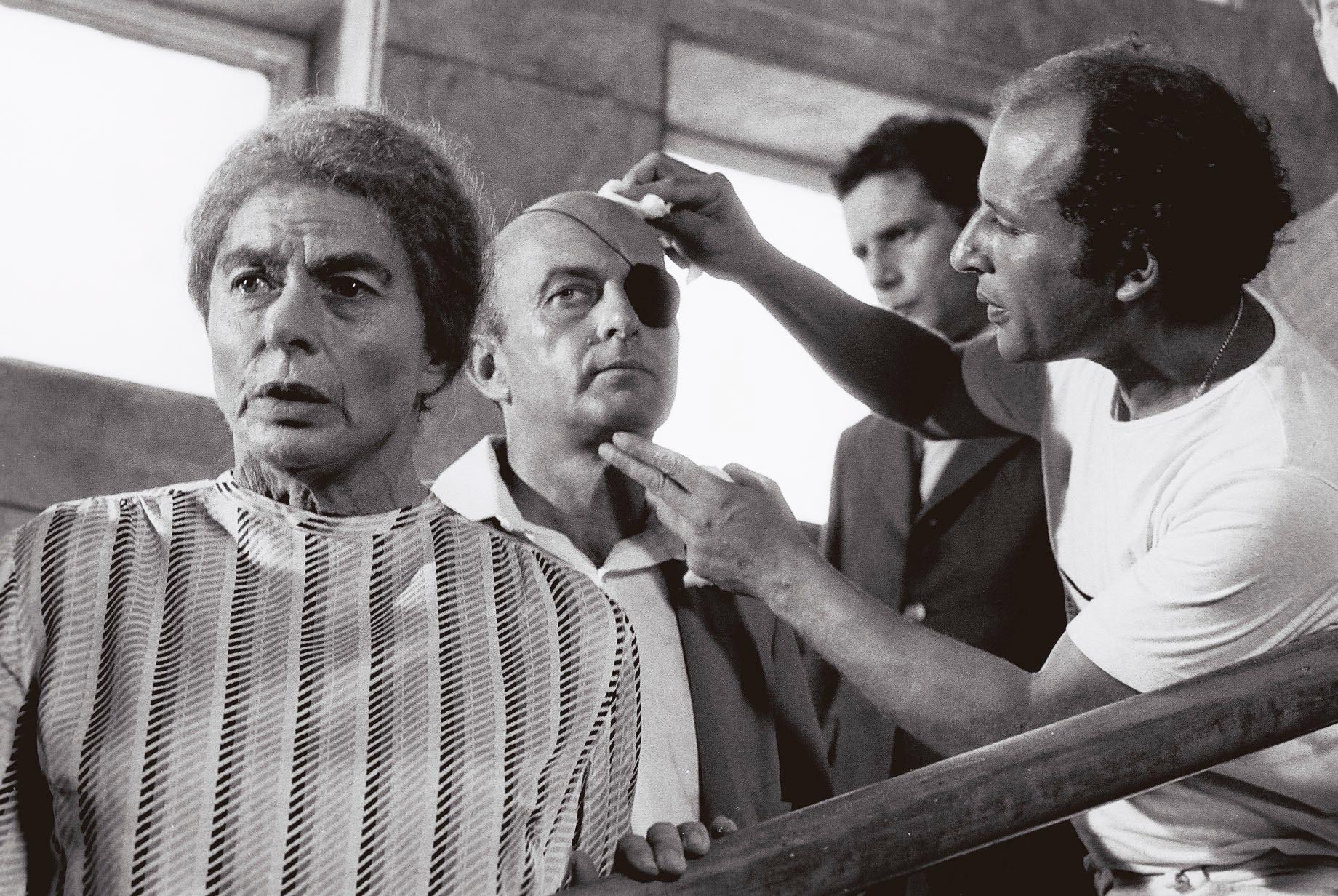
Ingrid Bergman, Yossi Graber (with eyepatch) and the make up team

In 1977, Golda Meir returns to her old school in Milwaukee, Wisconsin where she tells the students her life story. She recounts her early years in Russia, and how her family emigrated to America to avoid the persecution of Jews throughout Europe. As a young woman, Golda dreams of fighting for a country for all Jews of the world. She marries Morris Meyerson, and they eventually move to Palestine to work in a kibbutz, although they soon end up leaving, much to Golda's disappointment. They move to Jerusalem and have two children, but Golda's tremendous ambition soon drives her and Morris apart, although they remain married until his death in 1951.

Golda is elected Prime Minister of Israel in 1969, resigning after the Yom Kippur War in 1974.

The film ends with President Anwar Sadat of Egypt arriving in Israel.

== Cast ==
- Ingrid Bergman as Golda Meir
- Ned Beatty as Senator Durward
- Franklin Cover as Hubert Humphrey
- Judy Davis as Young Golda
- Anne Jackson as Lou Kaddar
- Robert Loggia as Anwar Sadat
- Leonard Nimoy as Morris Meyerson
- Jack Thompson as Ariel
- Anthony Bate as Sir Stuart Ross
- Ron Berglas as Stampler
- Bruce Boa as Mr. Macy
- David de Keyser as David Ben-Gurion
- Barry Foster as Major Orde Wingate
- Nigel Hawthorne as King Abdullah
- Yossi Graber as Moshe Dayan
- Oded Teomi as David Elazar

== Production ==
The mini series launched the international career of Australian actor Jack Thompson. It was one of a string of films where he supported a female star on American television.

== Reception ==
Christian Science Monitor critic Arthur Unger wrote that Bergman gave "the best television performance of this year or, perhaps, any other year," and that Davis "plays the young Golda with such believable intensity that she has already created an indelible character for Miss Bergman to take over as the older Golda." Unger wrote:"Without resorting to globs of makeup, somehow arranging her own Swedish accent to imply the Meir accent without making it an imitation or a parody, Miss Bergman manages to convey the essence of Mrs. Meir's character and the strength of her all-consuming dedication to her cause."

New York Times critic John J. O'Connor said that Bergman gave "a truly remarkable performance" but faulted the film for "gimmicks" and for giving a selective view of history, saying the film "makes little or no effort to assuage critics of Zionism."

In some countries the film was broadcast as a 2-part or 4-part mini series.

== Awards and accolades ==
At the 34th Primetime Emmy Awards, the film received seven Emmy nominations and won three awards, including the Outstanding Drama Special and Outstanding Lead Actress in a Miniseries or Movie for Ingrid Bergman, which was awarded posthumously (the award was accepted by Bergman's daughter Pia Lindström). Leonard Nimoy received an Emmy nomination for Outstanding Supporting Actor in a Limited Series or a Special as well as Judy Davis (as the young Golda Meir) for Outstanding Supporting Actress in a Limited Series or Special.

The film was also nominated for two Golden Globes and won the award for Best Performance by an Actress for Bergman, again awarded posthumously.

== See also ==
- Golda (film)
