= Franklin Cover =

American actor (1928–2006)

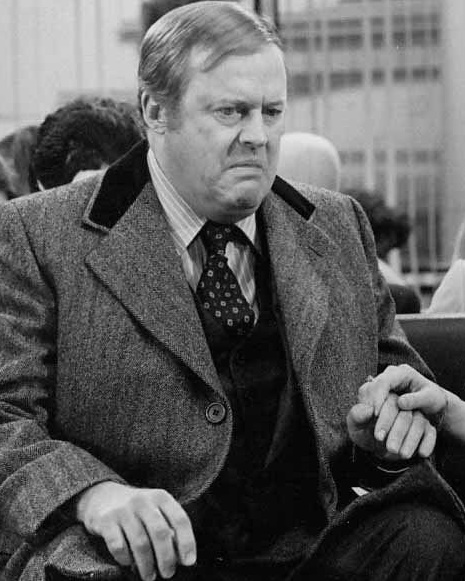
- Cover as Tom Willis on The Jeffersons
- Born: Franklin Edward Cover; November 20, 1928; Cleveland, Ohio, U.S.
- Died: February 5, 2006 (aged 77); Englewood, New Jersey, U.S.
- Education: Denison University; Case Western Reserve
- Occupation: Actor
- Years active: 1960–1999
- Spouse: Mary Bradford Stone (m. 1965)
- Children: 2

Franklin Edward Cover (November 20, 1928 – February 5, 2006) was an American actor best known for his role in The Jeffersons, Tom Willis, half of one of the first interracial marriages to be seen on prime-time television.

== Life and career ==
Cover was born on November 20, 1928, in Cleveland, Ohio, to Britta (Schreck) and Franklin Held Cover. He graduated from John Marshall High School in 1947. He graduated from Denison University in 1951 and from Western Reserve University (now Case Western Reserve University) as a graduate student in 1954 and 1955.

His career started on the stage acting in Henry IV, Part 1 and Hamlet. He also appeared in Forty Carats with Julie Harris. He made his television debut on Naked City and later appeared on The Jackie Gleason Show.

In 1965, he married Mary Bradford Stone.

His first starring role was on The Jeffersons as Tom Willis, a Caucasian man married to an African-American woman, Helen, played by Roxie Roker. The couple lived in the same high-rise apartment building as the sitcom's title characters. Cover would often be the foil to Sherman Hemsley's black businessman character, George Jefferson. The sitcom ran from 1975 to 1985. He also appeared in The Stepford Wives in 1975, and played Hubert Humphrey in the 1982 TV movie A Woman Called Golda.

Following the end of The Jeffersons, Cover continued to make guest appearances on television shows as well as appearing in a supporting role in Wall Street (1987). In 1994, he appeared in the second episode of ER. His final television appearance was in an episode of Will & Grace (entitled "Object of My Rejection") that aired on May 13, 1999.

== Death ==
Cover died at the Lillian Booth Actors Home in Englewood, New Jersey, on February 5, 2006. He had been living there since December 2005 while recovering from a heart condition, and died of pneumonia.

== Partial filmography ==
Year	Title	Role	Notes
1965	Mirage	Group leader	
1968	What's So Bad About Feeling Good?	Medical expert	Uncredited
1972	Short Walk to Daylight	Conductor	
1974	The Great Gatsby	Senator Evans	Uncredited
1975–1985	The Jeffersons	Tom Willis	
1975	The Stepford Wives	Ed Wimpiris	
1982	A Woman Called Golda	Hubert Humphrey	
1987	Wall Street	Dan	
1988	Zits	FBI Chief	
1991	Who's the Boss?	Mr.Campbell	
1994	Batman: The Animated Series	General Vreeland	Voice, episode "Harley's Holiday"
1998	Almost Heroes	Nicholas Burr	
1999	Will & Grace	Justice of the Peace	Episode "Object of My Rejection"
