= The Parisian Bitch, Princess of Hearts =

- French theatrical release poster
- French: Connasse, Princesse des cœurs
- Directed by: Éloïse Lang; Noémie Saglio
- Written by: Éloïse Lang; Noémie Saglio
- Based on: Connasse by: Noémie Saglio and; Éloïse Lang
- Produced by: Cyril Colbeau-Justin; Jean-Baptiste Dupont; Sidonie Dumas; Eloïse Lang; Noémie Saglio
- Starring: Camille Cottin
- Cinematography: Thomas Brémond
- Edited by: Sandro Lavezzi
- Music by: Fred Avril
- Production companies: LGM Cinema; Les Productions de la Connasse; Silex Films; Gaumont; TF1 Films Production
- Distributed by: Gaumont Distribution
- Release dates: 23 April 2015 (Elysée Biarritz); 29 April 2015 (France)
- Running time: 80 minutes
- Country: France
- Language: French
- Budget: $4 million
- Box office: $8.3 million

The Parisian Bitch, Princess of Hearts (French: Connasse, princesse des cœurs) is a 2015 French hidden camera comedy film written and directed by Éloïse Lang and Noémie Saglio. It is an adaptation and a continuation of the Canal+ sketch comedy television series Connasse by Lang and Saglio.

The film follows Camilla (Camille Cottin), a capricious Parisian woman who thinks she deserves a princess life and decides to go to the United Kingdom to try to marry Prince Harry. Much of the film features unscripted scenes of Cottin interacting with real-life people who do not know that she is playing a character.

The Parisian Bitch, Princess of Hearts had its premiere at the Elysée Biarritz in Paris on 23 April 2015, and was released theatrically in France on 29 April 2015 by Gaumont Distribution. The film received mixed to positive reviews from critics and grossed $8.3 million.

== Plot ==
The capricious thirty-year-old Parisian Camilla starts to think she's not living the life she deserves and would be the right wife for a proper English prince. Once that idea comes to mind, she flies to the United Kingdom to marry the last single prince, Harry. She stops at nothing to get close to him, demonstrating a staggering audacity.

== Cast ==
- Camille Cottin as Camilla, la "Connasse"
  - Lou Cottin and Rosie Mahon de Monaghan as young Camilla
- Marie-Christine Adam as the mother (voice)
- Cécile Boland as the nanny
- Antony Hickling as William (voice)

Additionally, Stéphane Bern, Kad Merad, and Michel Lafon Publishing's literary editor Huguette Maure also appear as themselves.

== Production ==
On 13 February 2015, Gaumont announced the release of a movie adaptation of the Canal+ hidden camera television series Connasse, with two teasers announcing the film's release on 29 April 2015. It was also announced that Éloïse Lang and Noémie Saglio, the series creators, directed the movie and that Camille Cottin reprised her role.

Filming took place in Paris and London. Lang and Saglio decided that the film would take place in England because of the recent notoriety of Cottin in France which made it more and more difficult to film the hidden camera footage in the country. The scenes were shot by a cameramen who accompanied Cottin, by members of the team scattered all over the place and sometimes by the actress herself using a GoPro camera hidden in various accessories (bags, strollers, etc...).

== Release ==
The Parisian Bitch, Princess of Hearts premiered in Paris at the Elysée Biarritz on 23 April 2015. It was released on 29 April 2015 in France by Gaumont Distribution. The film was released on Blu-ray and DVD on 2 September 2015 by Gaumont Vidéo.

The movie also premiered on Canal+ on 30 March 2016 followed by a behind the scenes documentary named God Save Connasse.

== Accolades ==
Camille Cottin received a Most Promising Actress nomination at the 41st César Awards for her role.
