= Stillwater (film) =

2021 American crime drama film directed by Tom McCarthy

- Theatrical release poster
- Directed by: Tom McCarthy
- Written by: Tom McCarthy; Marcus Hinchey; Thomas Bidegain; Noé Debré
- Produced by: Steve Golin; Tom McCarthy; Jonathan King; Liza Chasin
- Starring: Matt Damon; Camille Cottin; Abigail Breslin
- Cinematography: Masanobu Takayanagi
- Edited by: Tom McArdle
- Music by: Mychael Danna
- Production companies: Participant; DreamWorks Pictures; Slow Pony Pictures; Anonymous Content; 3dot Productions; Supernatural Pictures
- Distributed by: Focus Features
- Release dates: July 8, 2021 (Cannes); July 30, 2021 (United States)
- Running time: 139 minutes
- Country: United States
- Languages: English; French; Spanish
- Budget: $20 million
- Box office: $19.8 million

Stillwater is a 2021 American crime drama film directed by Tom McCarthy, based on a script he co-wrote with Marcus Hinchey, Thomas Bidegain and Noé Debré. It is the first DreamWorks Pictures film to be distributed by Universal's specialty label Focus Features. It stars Matt Damon as Bill Baker, an unemployed oil-rig worker from Oklahoma who sets out with a Frenchwoman (Camille Cottin) to prove his convicted daughter's (Abigail Breslin) innocence.

The film had its world premiere at the Cannes Film Festival on July 8, 2021, and was released theatrically in the United States on July 30, 2021, by Focus Features. It received generally positive reviews from critics and grossed $19 million against its $20 million budget.

== Plot ==
In Stillwater, Oklahoma, Bill Baker is a laid-off roughneck scraping by with odd construction jobs. Working disaster cleanup after a tornado in Shawnee, he struggles to find another oil rig position.

Bill meets with Sharon, his late wife's mother, before traveling to France to visit his daughter Allison, who has served five years of a nine-year prison sentence. While attending university in Marseille, she was convicted of killing her roommate and lover, Lina.

Allison gives her father a letter written in French to deliver to her defense lawyer Leparq, who explains that Allison heard from her former professor, Patrick Okonedo, about a man who claimed to be Lina's killer. Leparq says that no judge will be interested in hearsay, but Bill lies to Allison that her case will be reopened. At his hotel, Bill helps a young girl named Maya, and her mother Virginie translates Allison's letter, revealing her desperation at spending another four years in prison, and how little faith she has in her father to help.

Dirosa, a private investigator and retired police officer who worked on Allison's case, warns that she can only be exonerated with DNA evidence. Bill visits Okonedo, who gives him the phone number of Souad, a student who claims to know Lina's killer. Enlisting Virginie's help, Bill meets Souad and a friend at a Quick restaurant, where she identifies the killer as Akim, who lives in the Marseille slum of Kalliste-Granière-Solidarité, but her friend grows wary of Bill's questions and they leave.

Combing through social media, Virginie finds photos which Bill brings to Allison, who recognizes Akim. Searching for him in Kalliste, he is beaten by a gang until another group arrives, including Akim. Driven out of the neighborhood, Bill admits to Allison that he lied about Leparq agreeing to help and that he lost Akim. Furious, Allison sends him away.

Four months later, Bill has remained in Marseille, renting a room in Virginie's apartment and helping her care for Maya while working for a construction crew. Allison is granted a day of parole, supervised by Bill, (Note: Allison is in Marseilles, which is the hometown of Edmond Dantès in Alexandre Dumas' 1846 novel, The Count of Monte Cristo. Dantès was convicted of a crime he did not commit and sent to the Marseille prison island Château d'If, which is visible in the background of several scenes in which Allison and Bill are swimming.) who introduces her to Virginie and Maya. Returning to prison, she tries to hang herself, but Bill continues to visit her as their relationship grows stronger. He and Virginie grow closer as well, developing into a romance.

Bill surprises Maya with tickets for an Olympique de Marseille football game at the Stade Vélodrome, where he spots Akim. With Maya asleep, Bill abducts Akim, paying Dirosa to test Akim's hair against DNA from the crime scene. Maya later discovers he is keeping Akim prisoner in the basement of their apartment building, but Bill implores her to keep the secret.

Akim tells Bill that Allison hired him to kill Lina, paying him with a gold necklace bearing the word "Stillwater". Dirosa suspects Bill is holding Akim captive, and poses as a building inspector to question Virginie about the basement, arousing her own suspicions.

Bill is soon confronted by the police, but the basement is empty and Maya lies to protect him. Virginie does not admit to freeing Akim, but she kicks Bill out for putting her and Maya at risk, and he hugs a tearful Maya goodbye. Leparq informs Bill that Dirosa came forward with new evidence, allowing Allison's case to be reopened.

Allison is exonerated, and returns with her father to a hero's welcome in Oklahoma. Bill asks her about the Stillwater necklace he gave her when she first left for Marseille, and Allison breaks down, confessing that she paid Akim to evict the unfaithful Lina from their apartment, but never intended for him to kill her. As they sit on the porch, Allison says everything looks the same in Stillwater, while Bill declares that he can hardly recognize it anymore.

== Cast ==
- Matt Damon as Bill Baker, an unemployed roughneck whose daughter ends up imprisoned for murder in France. Bill believes in his daughter's innocence so strongly that he takes up investigating her case when no one else will.
- Abigail Breslin as Allison Baker, Bill's daughter. Convicted of murdering her roommate and lover Lina, she still maintains her innocence even after five years of imprisonment. She inadvertently sets her father out to investigate her case by asking him to pass a letter to her lawyer.
- Camille Cottin as Virginie, a single mother living in France who decides to help Bill investigate his daughter's case. She rents Bill a room and translates for him as he pursues leads.
- Lilou Siauvaud as Maya, Virginie's daughter. Bill helps Virginie care for Maya and acts as a father figure to her.
- Deanna Dunagan as Sharon, Bill's mother-in-law and Allison's grandmother. She helps support Bill and Allison financially and coordinates with Allison on Bill's visits to France.
- Idir Azougli as Akim, the mystery man that Bill believes is the real killer.
- Anne Le Ny as Leparq, Allison's lawyer.
- Moussa Maaskri as Dirosa, a retired police officer who offers to help Bill for money.
- William Nadylam as Patrick, a university professor whom Bill tracks down for information on the real killer's identity.

== Production ==
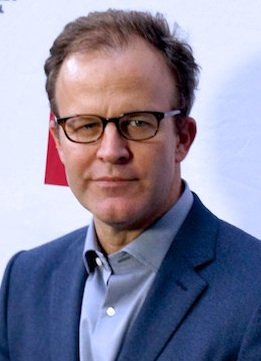
Tom McCarthy, director of Stillwater

It was announced in July 2019 that Tom McCarthy would write and direct the film, with Matt Damon set to star. Abigail Breslin was added to the cast later in the month, with filming beginning in August 2019. Camille Cottin was added to the cast in September. Mychael Danna composed the film's score. It was filmed on location in Oklahoma and Marseille.

== Release ==
The film had its world premiere at the Cannes Film Festival on July 8, 2021. It was scheduled to be released in the U.S. on November 6, 2020, but was delayed due to the COVID-19 pandemic until July 30, 2021.

== Reception ==
=== Box office ===
Stillwater grossed $14.6 million in the United States and Canada, and $5.4 million in other territories, for a worldwide total of $19.8 million.

In the United States and Canada, Stillwater was released alongside Jungle Cruise and The Green Knight, and was projected to gross around $5 million from 2,531 theaters in its opening weekend. The film made $1.8 million on its first day, including $280,000 from Thursday-night previews. It went on to debut with $5.2 million, finishing fifth. The film fell 45% to $2.6 million in its second weekend, remaining in fifth place.

=== Critical response ===
On the review aggregator website Rotten Tomatoes, 75% of 199 critics' reviews are positive, with an average rating of 6.6/10. The website's consensus reads: "Stillwater isn't perfect, but its thoughtful approach to intelligent themes — and strong performances from its leads — give this timely drama a steadily building power." Metacritic, which uses a weighted average, assigned the film a score of 60 out of 100, based on 41 critics, indicating "mixed or average" reviews. Audiences polled by CinemaScore gave the film an average grade of "B−" on an A+ to F scale, while 63% of PostTrak audience members gave it a positive score, with 34% saying that they would definitely recommend it.

Richard Roeper of the Chicago Sun-Times gave the film a score of 3.5/4 stars, describing it as "provocative and stirring" and praising Damon's performance as Bill Baker, but wrote: "Bill is also prone to rash actions, which leads to a relatively late development in Stillwater that is jarring and misguided and lands this movie just short of greatness". David Sims of The Atlantic noted similarities between the film and director Tom McCarthy's previous films, The Visitor and Win Win, but added: "McCarthy's excellent, if sprawling, script is more interested in the humans behind the headlines and the messy ways people try to reconcile their grief and guilt after indescribable trauma". Simran Hans of The Observer gave the film a score of 3/5 stars, describing it as "a thoughtful, knotty character study, albeit one nestled inside a polished, and less interesting, action thriller".

Brian Lowry of CNN was more critical of the film, writing that it "confounds expectations in mostly frustrating ways", and that it "runs long but doesn't run particularly deep – or at least, not quite deep enough". Clarisse Loughrey of The Independent gave the film a score of 2/5 stars, describing it as "an empty gesture of a film", and wrote: "It doesn't reckon with the injustice Knox faced [see Amanda Knox reaction below]. Nor does it sympathise with her time behind bars. She doesn't even get to be the main character. That would be Matt Damon's Bill Baker, Allison's father – a completely fictional figure, with none of this family's details matching up to Knox's".

=== Amanda Knox reaction ===
Amanda Knox, whose real life story is thought to have inspired the movie, denounced the film and its creators on Twitter for profiting from her wrongful conviction and for distorting the facts of her story. Knox said that "by fictionalizing away my innocence, my total lack of involvement, by erasing the role of the authorities in my wrongful conviction, McCarthy reinforces an image of me as a guilty and untrustworthy person".
