= On a Magical Night =

2019 film by Christophe Honoré

- Theatrical release poster
- French: Chambre 212
- Directed by: Christophe Honoré
- Written by: Christophe Honoré
- Produced by: Philippe Martin; David Thion
- Starring: Chiara Mastroianni; Vincent Lacoste; Camille Cottin; Benjamin Biolay
- Cinematography: Rémy Chevrin
- Edited by: Chantal Hymans
- Production companies: Les Films Pelléas; Bidibul Productions; Scope Pictures; France 2 Cinéma
- Distributed by: Memento Films
- Release dates: 19 May 2019 (Cannes); 9 October 2019 (France and Belgium)
- Running time: 90 minutes
- Countries: France; Belgium; Luxembourg
- Language: French
- Box office: $3 million

On a Magical Night (French: Chambre 212, lit. 'Room 212') is a 2019 comedy-drama film written and directed by Christophe Honoré and starring Chiara Mastroianni, Vincent Lacoste, Camille Cottin and Benjamin Biolay. It premiered in the Un Certain Regard section of the 2019 Cannes Film Festival, where Mastroianni won the award for Best Performance.

== Premise ==
College law lecturer Maria has been married to Richard for 20 years. After revealing her history of affairs with younger men, she leaves their Paris apartment and spends the night in a hotel across the street. In her room, she is visited by Richard's younger self, as well as her ex-lovers.

== Cast ==
- Chiara Mastroianni as Maria Mortemart
- Vincent Lacoste as Richard Warrimer at 20 years old
- Camille Cottin as Irène Haffner at 40 years old
- Benjamin Biolay as Richard Warrimer at 40 years old
- Stéphane Roger as Maria's will
- Harrison Arévalo as Asdrubal Electorat
- Carole Bouquet as Irène Haffner at 60 years old
- Marie-Christine Adam as Maria's mother

== Production ==
The film's working title was Musique de chambre. Christophe Honoré wrote the screenplay of the film for Chiara Mastroianni, imagining her as "a Cary Grant-type character." It is Honoré's first film that was shot in a studio. It was shot in six weeks, five of which were in the studio. Filming wrapped on 19 March 2019.

== Release ==
On a Magical Night premiered in the Un Certain Regard section of the 2019 Cannes Film Festival on 19 May 2019. The film was released theatrically in France on 9 October 2019. In the United States, it was released in virtual cinemas on 8 May 2020 by Strand Releasing.

== Reception ==
=== Box office ===
On a Magical Night grossed $3 million worldwide.

=== Critical response ===
On the review aggregator website Rotten Tomatoes, the film holds an approval rating of 66% based on 32 reviews, with an average rating of 6.3/10. The website's critics consensus reads, "It isn't quite as exceptional as the titular evening, but On a Magical Night offers enough Gallic whimsy to satisfy audiences in the mood for some romance." On Metacritic, the film has a weighted average score of 53 out of 100, based on 12 critics, indicating "mixed or average reviews".

Stephen Dalton of The Hollywood Reporter called the film "[b]reezy and bright, with the stylized look and feel of a stage play". Owen Gleiberman of Variety wrote, "At 90 minutes, the film feels endless, and we have too much time to notice that the two actors playing Richard seem like two totally different people, and that the film has holes in its fantasy logic you could drive a truck through."

Chiara Mastroianni won the Best Performance award in the Un Certain Regard section of the 2019 Cannes Film Festival.
