= Lou Kaddar =

Israeli political staffer (1913–2006)

- לו קדר
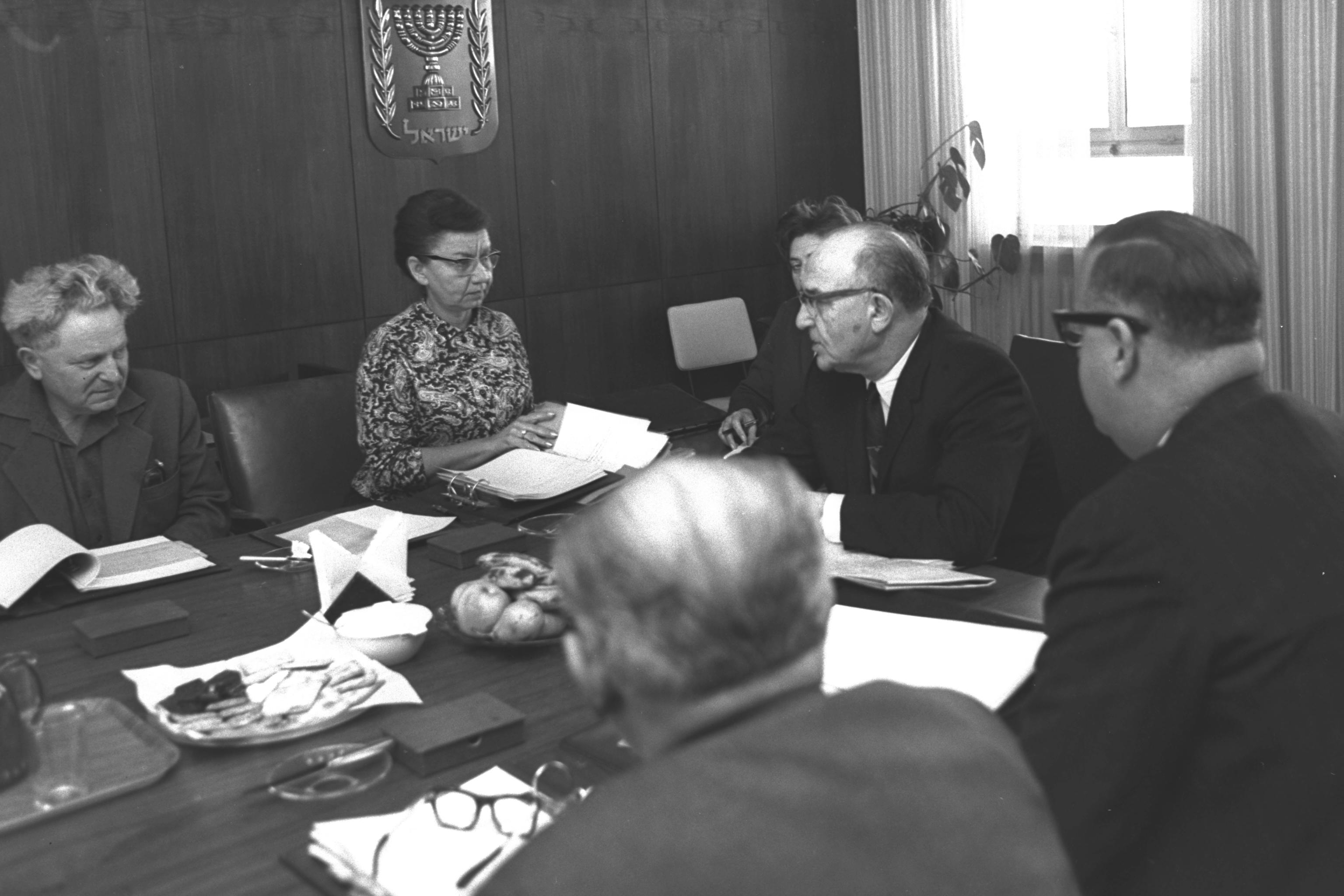
- Israel Galili, Lou Keidar, Levi Eshkol, and Abba Eban meeting in Jerusalem, 16 January 1966 (National Photo Collection of Israel D47-102)
- Born: 23 June 1913; Paris, France
- Died: 10 April 2006 (aged 92); Israel
- Other names: Lou Keidar, Lou Kedar, Lou Kadar
- Known for: Private secretary to Golda Meir

Lou Kaddar (Hebrew: לו קדר; 23 June 1913 – 10 April 2006) was an Israeli political staffer, diplomat, interpreter, and social worker. From 1948 to 1978, she served as Golda Meir's private secretary and confidante. Kaddar worked for Meir when she was Minister of Labor, Minister of Foreign Affairs, and Prime Minister of Israel.

== Career ==
Meir and Kaddar began working together in 1948, at the time of Meir's service with the Israeli legation in Moscow. Kaddar told a reporter in 1971 that Meir had the third diplomatic passport ever issued by Israel, and she had the seventh. Most of the ambassadors spoke French, so Kaddar's job was to translate French to Hebrew for Meir, but according to the Los Angeles Times in 1982 "their friendship bloomed...with the humor they both saw in their first unsophisticated attempts to interpret protocol...Kaddar turned to Meir and asked in Hebrew. 'And how did we arrive?' Meir replied, straight-faced, 'We rode donkeys,' and Kaddar straight-faced said in French to the ambassador, 'By plane.' To 'Where are you staying?' Meir replied, 'Under a tent,' which Kaddar interpreted as the standard 'At the Hotel Metropol'". Kaddar also accompanied Meir on her visit to the Moscow Choral Synagogue in 1948.

Kaddar worked on and off as Meir's private secretary for many years, including while she was prime minister. Kaddar told a reporter in 1984 that she had left Foreign Minister Meir's service after three years in order to spend more time with friends and family, but, "Then came Prime Minister Eshkol's death in February 1969. Golda was called out of retirement and nominated as his successor. I agreed to join her for six months until the next Knesset elections. Thus, as I used to put it, 'we' became Prime Minister. And the six months together extended into years. We went through the war of attrition, and terrorists' attacks—at Lod airport, where dozens of Catholic pilgrims from Puerto Rico were killed; at Avivim in the north, when a school bus was attacked and children killed; at Kiryat Shmona; and the murders at the Munich Olympics. And the Yom Kippur war." On the lighter side of public service, one history records how, when Golda Meir was to be introduced to the Pope but was found to lack the requisite head covering, Kaddar arranged for an El Al charter to fetch Meir a "Persian lamb hat" that arrived in the nick of time for the encounter and the photographs.

In Kaddar's later life, she contributed to the Golda Meir Archive at the Israel State Archive.

== Personal life ==
Lou Kaddar was born in Paris, France to a family of Russian-Jewish immigrants. Kaddar worked as a social worker for impoverished Jewish families in Paris before immigrating to Mandatory Palestine in 1935. She was employed by the Jewish Agency. Kaddar served in the Haganah prior to the establishment of Israel, with a focus on smuggling arms, including dismantled guns and grenades. Kaddar was injured in the car bombing of the National Institutions House in 1948.

Julie Nixon Eisenhower characterized Kaddar as a "slightly irreverent and candid" person. Kaddar said of Meir in 1982, "I don't consider her like a boss. She was a very, very good friend." Kaddar was present with the family when Meir died in 1978. After Meir's death, when asked if she might ever write a memoir, she replied tearfully, "Maybe, maybe. I'm still under the shock of not having Golda."

Kaddar was divorced and had no children. Kaddar died in Israel in 2006.

== In popular culture ==
Kaddar appeared as a character in two Meir biopics. She was played by Anne Jackson in A Woman Called Golda, the 1982 telefilm starring Ingrid Bergman. She was played by Camille Cottin in Golda, the 2023 theatrical film starring Helen Mirren.
