= Golda (film) =

2023 film by Guy Nattiv

- Theatrical release poster
- Directed by: Guy Nattiv
- Written by: Nicholas Martin
- Produced by: Michael Kuhn; Jane Hooks; Nicholas Martin
- Starring: Helen Mirren; Camille Cottin; Liev Schreiber; Lior Ashkenazi; Dvir Benedek
- Cinematography: Jasper Wolf
- Edited by: Arik Lahav-Leibovich
- Music by: Dascha Dauenhauer
- Production companies: Piccadilly Pictures; Big Entrance; Embankment Films; Lipsync Productions; Qwerty Films
- Distributed by: Bleecker Street ShivHans Pictures (United States); Vertical Entertainment MetFilm Distribution (United Kingdom and Ireland)
- Release dates: February 20, 2023 (Berlinale); August 25, 2023 (United States); October 6, 2023 (United Kingdom)
- Running time: 100 minutes
- Countries: United States; United Kingdom
- Language: English
- Box office: $7.7 million

Golda is a 2023 biographical drama film directed by Guy Nattiv and written by Nicholas Martin. The film depicts the actions of Golda Meir, the 4th Prime Minister of Israel, during the Yom Kippur War. It stars Helen Mirren, Camille Cottin and Liev Schreiber.

It received its world premiere at the 2023 Berlin International Film Festival on February 20, 2023. It was released in the United States by Bleecker Street and Shivhans Pictures on August 25, 2023, and in the United Kingdom and Ireland by Vertical Entertainment and MetFilm Distribution on October 6, 2023. The film received a Best Makeup and Hairstyling nomination at the 96th Academy Awards.

== Plot ==
In October 1973, Mossad relays intelligence to the Israeli prime minister, Golda Meir, warning of an Egyptian-Syrian military campaign against them. Meir is dismissive of the intelligence and unable to initiate a spoiling attack without the support of her defense minister, Moshe Dayan, who is equally sceptical.

On 6 October, the day of Yom Kippur, Meir's inner circle informs her that Egyptian forces massed across the Suez Canal will initiate hostilities by sundown. She refuses to make a pre-emptive move and orders a partial mobilization. The attack commences early, surprising her. Dayan, inspecting the Golan Heights, is horrified to discover that Syria has launched an effective attack against the ill-prepared Israeli troops. Meir's confidence in him is shaken but she refuses to accept his resignation.

Over the course of 7–8 October Egypt and Syria advance deep into Israel. IDF chief of staff Lt. Gen. David Elazar proposes a relief of Israeli fortifications in the Sinai Peninsula by the 162nd Division led by Maj. Gen. Avraham Adan. Mossad chief Zvi Zamir opposes the plan, which fails, and the Egyptians defeat the Israelis. The Syrian offensive slows and Dayan proposes an air strike on Damascus to put pressure on Egypt. The Israeli Air Force (IAF) is unable to proceed due to a shortage of aircraft and Meir convinces a reluctant US secretary of state Henry Kissinger to provide surplus warplanes to the IAF.

On the fifth day, amidst increasing tensions, Maj. Gen. Ariel Sharon proposes operations across the canal by the 143rd Division against the Egyptian Second and Third Armies. Zvi tells Meir that a planned attack by two Egyptian divisions across the canal would leave Cairo undefended. The intelligence proves correct, and Israeli tank forces led by Lt. Gen. Haim Bar-Lev defeat the Egyptians.

On 15 October, Sharon's Israeli forces cross the canal at an undefended point called the "Chinese Farm". They survive an ambush by Egyptian units and Elazar prepares to barricade the Third Army by cutting Suez from Cairo and force Egypt into negotiations. Kissinger urges Meir to accept a ceasefire but she proceeds with the offensive and forces Egypt into talks.

By the twentieth day, both sides have agreed to diplomatic talks and a prisoner exchange, effectively concluding the conflict. Zvi privately informs Meir that he's learned IDF military intelligence chief Maj. Gen. Eli Zeira had neglected to properly monitor signals intelligence from the Egyptian side and was responsible for Israel's vulnerability to attack. Meir opts to bear the blame herself to shield the IDF from controversy. Even though the war ended in an Israeli victory, the aged Meir has suffered an emotional and physical toll, and is diagnosed with cancer.

Meir testifies before the Agranat Commission a year later for her conduct of the war. She states off the record that despite her initial uncertainty, she had genuinely felt war was certain. Four years later, on 8 December 1978, a bedridden Meir dies watching footage of her meeting with Egyptian president Anwar Sadat a year earlier.

An epilogue reveals the commission cleared Golda Meir of wrongdoing and that she lived to see the signing of the Camp David Accords, the first formal measures of peace between Israel and its Arab neighbors.

== Cast ==
- Helen Mirren as Golda Meir, Prime Minister of Israel
- Camille Cottin as Lou Kaddar, private secretary to Golda Meir
- Rami Heuberger as Moshe Dayan, Minister of Defense for Israel
- Rotem Keinan as Zvi Zamir, Director of Mossad
- Emma Davies as Miss Epstein, a typist in the Prime Minister's Office
- Lior Ashkenazi as Lt. Gen. David "Dado" Elazar, the Chief of Staff, IDF
- Dominic Mafham as Lt. Gen. Haim Bar-Lev, Commander, Southern Command
- Dvir Benedek as Maj. Gen. Eli Zeira, Director of Military Intelligence
- Ed Stoppard as Maj. Gen. Benny Peled, Commander of the Israeli Air Force
- Ohad Knoller as Maj. Gen. Ariel "Arik" Sharon, Commander, 143rd Division, IDF
- Liev Schreiber as Henry Kissinger, United States Secretary of State
- Jaime Ray Newman as Henry Kissinger's secretary

== Production ==
=== Development ===
In April 2021, it was announced Helen Mirren was set to star, with Guy Nattiv to direct, a screenplay by Nicholas Martin. In November 2021, Camille Cottin, Rami Heuberger, Lior Ashkenazi, Ellie Piercy, Ed Stoppard, Rotem Keinan, Dvir Benedek, Dominic Mafham, Ben Caplan, Kit Rakusen and Emma Davies joined the cast. In January 2022, Liev Schreiber announced his involvement.

=== Filming ===
Principal photography began on November 8, 2021, in London, United Kingdom.

=== Casting controversy ===
Helen Mirren was cast as Golda Meir at the behest of Meir's grandson Gideon. In January 2022, British actress Maureen Lipman and others criticized the casting choice on account of Mirren not being Jewish, stating: "I'm sure she will be marvelous, but it would never be allowed for Ben Kingsley to play Nelson Mandela. You just couldn't even go there." The following month, Mirren responded by saying Lipman was "utterly legitimate" to criticize her casting, and she had discussed the decision to cast her in the film with director Nattiv.

== Release ==
In July 2021, Bleecker Street and ShivHans Pictures acquired US distribution rights to the film. In August 2023, Vertical Entertainment acquired UK and Irish distribution rights in partnership with MetFilm Distribution. It had its world premiere at the 73rd Berlin International Film Festival on February 20, 2023. It also screened at the Jerusalem Film Festival on July 13, 2023. It was released in Israel on August 24, 2023, by United King Films, and in the United States the next day, on August 25, 2023. The film was released theatrically in the United Kingdom and Ireland on October 6, 2023.

Golda was released for digital platforms on September 19, 2023, followed by a Blu-ray and DVD release on October 17, 2023.

== Reception ==
=== Box office ===
In the United States and Canada, Golda was released alongside Gran Turismo, The Hill, and Retribution, and was projected to gross around $1 million from 883 theaters in its opening weekend. It finished its run with $4.8 million in the United States and $6 million worldwide.

=== Critical response ===
On the review aggregator website Rotten Tomatoes, 53% of 129 critics' reviews are positive, with an average rating of 5.9/10. The website's consensus reads: "Helen Mirren is typically masterful in the title role, but Golda never amounts to much more than a passable history lesson presented in largely underwhelming biopic form." Metacritic, which uses a weighted average, assigned the film a score of 48 out of 100, based on 27 critics, indicating "mixed or average" reviews.

In a positive review, Matt Goldberg describes the film as "an acknowledgment of sacrifice" and "cold pragmatism leading to the warmth of peace". In a negative review, the film was described as "typical Israeli propaganda", by Ramzy Baroud, published in Arab News and Middle East Monitor.

A The New York Times review by Amy Nicholson concluded that against the backdrop of a surprise attack on Israel, the script, by Nicholas Martin, focuses on the haunting body count rather than the righteousness of the conflict, where one is "left with a sense that the stress of those thousands of lives cut short may have killed her (Golda) too".

=== Accolades ===
| Award | Date of ceremony | Category | Recipient | Result | Ref. |
|---|---|---|---|---|---|
| World Soundtrack Awards | October 21, 2023 | Discovery of the Year | Dascha Dauenhauer | Nominated | |
| Women Film Critics Circle | December 18, 2023 | Best Actress | Helen Mirren | 4th place | |
| Women Film Critics Circle | December 18, 2023 | Best Equality of the Sexes | Golda | Nominated | |
| Alliance of Women Film Journalists | January 3, 2024 | Grand Dame for Defying Ageism | Helen Mirren (also for Fast X) | Nominated | |
| AARP Movies for Grownups Awards | January 17, 2024 | Best Actress | Helen Mirren | Nominated | |
| Cinema for Peace Awards | February 19, 2024 | Most Valuable Film of the Year 2024 | Guy Nattiv | Won | |
| Make-Up Artists and Hair Stylists Guild | February 18, 2024 | Best Special Make-Up Effects | Karen Thomas, Eva Susanna Johnson Theodosiou | Nominated | |
| Academy Awards | March 10, 2024 | Best Makeup and Hairstyling | Karen Thomas, Eva Susanna Johnson Theodosiou | Nominated | |

== See also ==
- A Woman Called Golda, a 1982 biographical TV film
