= I Kissed a Girl (film) =

- Theatrical release poster
- French: Toute première fois
- Directed by: Noémie Saglio; Maxime Govare
- Written by: Noémie Saglio; Maxime Govare
- Produced by: Sidonie Dumas; Renaud Chélélékian; Edouard Duprey
- Starring: Pio Marmaï; Franck Gastambide; Adrianna Gradziel; Lannick Gautry; Camille Cottin
- Cinematography: Jérôme Alméras
- Edited by: Béatrice Herminie
- Music by: Mathieu Lamboley
- Production companies: Les Improductibles; Kaly Productions; Gaumont; M6 Films
- Distributed by: Gaumont Distribution
- Release date: 28 January 2015
- Running time: 98 minutes
- Country: France
- Language: French
- Budget: $6 million
- Box office: $2.7 million

I Kissed a Girl (French: Toute première fois) is a 2015 French comedy film directed by Noémie Saglio and Maxime Govare. The film's original title, "Toute première fois" (English: Very first time), refers to a gay man's first time having sex with a woman and is the story of a gay man who is engaged, but considers leaving his boyfriend after beginning an affair with a woman.

== Plot ==
Jérémie (Pio Marmaï), a Parisian gay man, unexpectedly finds himself waking up in bed in an apartment he doesn't know, next to a woman he's never met. To his surprise, he discovers that he has had a drunken one-night stand with a beautiful Swedish woman (Adrianna Gradziel) named Adna. This is the first time with a woman for Jérémie, who is happily engaged to his boyfriend Antoine (Lannick Gautry). What follows is the story of Jérémie's "coming in," as the now sexually confused gay man begins to question his sexuality as he falls in love with a woman for the first time. Jérémie's burgeoning romance with Adna threatens to foil the upcoming nuptials as Antoine becomes increasingly suspicious. Jérémie is faced with the choice of staying gay and getting married or going straight and upending his life. He confesses the affair to his heterosexual male friend Charles (Franck Gastambide), who suggests that Jérémie may be bisexual and encourages him to continue the relationship. Following Charles' advice, Jérémie continues his affair with Adna to see if his attraction to her is genuine. As the wedding day approaches and his relationship of 10 years begins to fray, Jérémie is forced to confess his infidelity to Antoine. He leaves Antoine to be with Adna. With his gay relationship over, Jérémie decides to come out of the closet to reveal his bisexuality to the world.

== Cast ==
- Pio Marmaï as Jérémie Deprez
- Franck Gastambide as Charles
- Adrianna Gradziel as Adna
- Lannick Gautry as Antoine
- Camille Cottin as Clémence
- Frédéric Pierrot as Hubert Deprez
- Isabelle Candelier as Françoise Deprez
- Sébastien Castro as Nounours
- Nicole Ferroni as Sarah Deprez
- Étienne Guiraud as Jean
