= I Am Not an Easy Man =

2018 film by Éléonore Pourriat

- Official release poster
- French: Je ne suis pas un homme facile
- Directed by: Éléonore Pourriat
- Written by: Éléonore Pourriat; Ariane Fert (Note: Collaboration)
- Produced by: Eleonore Dailly; Edouard de Lachomette
- Starring: Vincent Elbaz; Marie-Sophie Ferdane; Pierre Bénézit; Moon Dailly
- Cinematography: Pénélope Pourriat
- Edited by: Élise Fievet
- Music by: Fred Avril
- Production companies: Autopilot Entertainment; Film Invaders; LOVEMYTV; MademoiselleFilms
- Distributed by: Netflix
- Release date: 13 April 2018
- Running time: 98 minutes
- Country: France
- Language: French

I Am Not an Easy Man (French: Je ne suis pas un homme facile) is a 2018 French romantic comedy film written and directed by Éléonore Pourriat. The film stars Vincent Elbaz as a chauvinist who ends up in a parallel universe where stereotypical gender roles are reversed. The film was released on 13 April 2018 on Netflix. It is the second French-language Netflix original film (after Blockbuster) and the first French-language film commissioned by Netflix.

== Synopsis ==
Damien is a shameless chauvinist who has all the benefits of living in a patriarchal society. After a bump to the head, Damien passes out. When he wakes up, he finds himself in what seems to be an alternate universe where gender roles are reversed and women have the power. Damien feels confused: now that he experiences sexism he struggles to find his place in this foreign new world. He meets and seduces Alexandra, an influential novelist who is herself a chauvinist.

== Cast ==
- Vincent Elbaz as Damien
- Marie-Sophie Ferdane as Alexandra
- Pierre Bénézit as Christophe
- Blanche Gardin as Sybille
- Céline Menville as Lolo
- Christele Tual as Annie
- Moon Dailly as Alexandra's coach
- Camille Landru-Girardet as Ludovic

== Production ==
The film finds its origins in Oppressed Majority (French: Majorité opprimée), a 2010 short film directed by Pourriat, about a stay-at-home dad who experiences sexism in a parallel, female-dominated world, and eventually becomes the victim of sexual assault. In 2014, after being released on video-sharing platform YouTube with English-language subtitles, the short garnered international attention and Pourriat was approached by Netflix to develop a new, larger project based on the initial premise. Pourriat initially wanted to make a series, but she eventually reached an agreement with Netflix to produce a feature-length romantic comedy with the help of producers Eleonore Dailly and Edouard de Lachomette.

The film premiered on Netflix on 13 April 2018. In accordance with French laws on digital film distribution, the film was not scheduled for theatrical release in France, in order to be immediately available online. Pierre Bénézit, the lead actor in Oppressed Majority, played the supporting character Christophe in I Am Not an Easy Man.

== Reception ==
Étienne Sorin of Le Figaro deplored the film as an "uneven comedy" and conventional. For her part, Arièle Bonte, on RTL, advises the vision of the film for, in particular, the disturbing subject likely to change mentalities and the “amazing” quality of the interpretation of Marie-Sophie Ferdane.

== Remake ==
In October 2024, Netflix announced an English-language remake of the film titled Ladies First to be directed by Thea Sharrock from a script written by Katie Silberman, Natalie Krinsky, and Cinco Paul, with Sacha Baron Cohen and Rosamund Pike starring in the lead roles.

In November 2024, Richard E. Grant, Emily Mortimer, Charles Dance, Fiona Shaw, Tom Davis and Weruche Opia joined the cast.
