= Noémie Saglio =

French film director and screenwriter (born 1982)

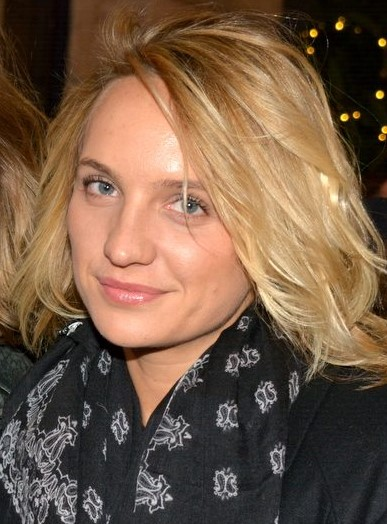
- Noémie Saglio in 2016
- Born: Noémie Saglio; 1 March 1982 (age 44)
- Occupations: Director, screenwriter
- Years active: 2002–present

Noémie Saglio (born 1 March 1982) is a French film director and screenwriter.

== Filmography ==
Year	Title	Role	Box office	Notes
2002	Superhero	Actress		Short
2005	Convivium	Actress		Short
2006	Rose et Val	Actress		TV series (1 episode)
2012	Les Voies impénétrables	Co-director & Writer		TV movie
2013–15	Connasse	Co-director		TV series (70 episodes)
2015	The Parisian Bitch, Princess of Hearts	Co-director, Writer & Producer	$8.3 million	Nominated - Filmfest Hamburg - Audience Award
2015	I Kissed a Girl	Co-director & Writer	$2.6 million	
2016	Baby Bump(S)	Director, writer & Producer	$1.4 million	
2017	Daddy Cool	Writer		Directed by Maxime Govare
2018	The Hook Up Plan	Director, writer & Producer		TV series
2020	The ABCs of Love	Director		
2024	Nice Girls	Director & writer		
2025	Shafted	Director & writer		TV series
2025	Natacha (Almost) Air Hostess	Director		
